= List of Billboard number-one singles of the 1940s =

Billboard number-one singles chart (which preceded the Billboard Hot 100 chart), which was updated weekly by the Billboard magazine, was the main singles chart of the American music industry since 1940 and until the Billboard Hot 100 chart was established in 1958.

Before the Billboard Hot 100 chart was established in August 1958, which was based on a formula combining sales data of commercially available singles and airplay on American radio stations, the Billboard used to publish several song popularity charts weekly. Throughout most of the 1940s the magazine published the following three charts:

- Best Selling Singles – ranked the biggest selling singles in retail stores, as reported by merchants surveyed throughout the country.
- Most Played Juke Box Records (debuted January 1944) – ranked the most played songs in jukeboxes across the United States.
- Most Played by Jockeys (debuted February 1945) – ranked the most played songs on United States radio stations, as reported by radio disc jockeys and radio stations.

The list below includes the Best Selling Singles chart only.

== Number ones ==
Key
♪ – Number-one single of the year

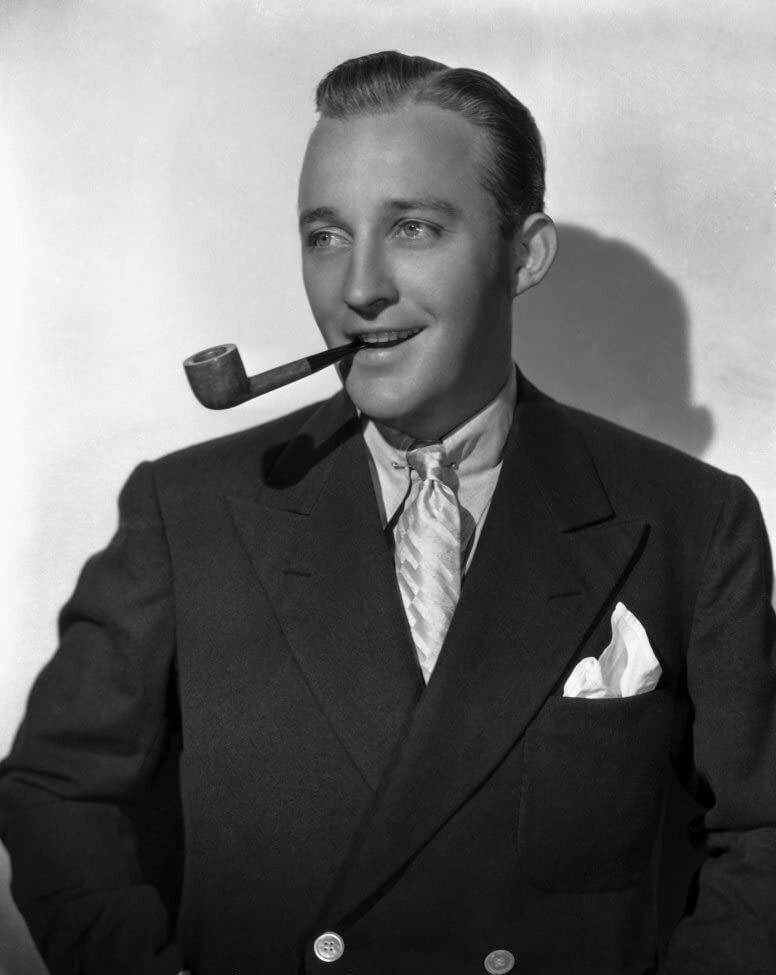
Bing Crosby had the highest number of hits at the top of the Billboard number-one singles chart during the 1940s (9 songs). In addition, Crosby remained the longest at the top of the Billboard number-one singles chart during the 1940s (55 weeks).

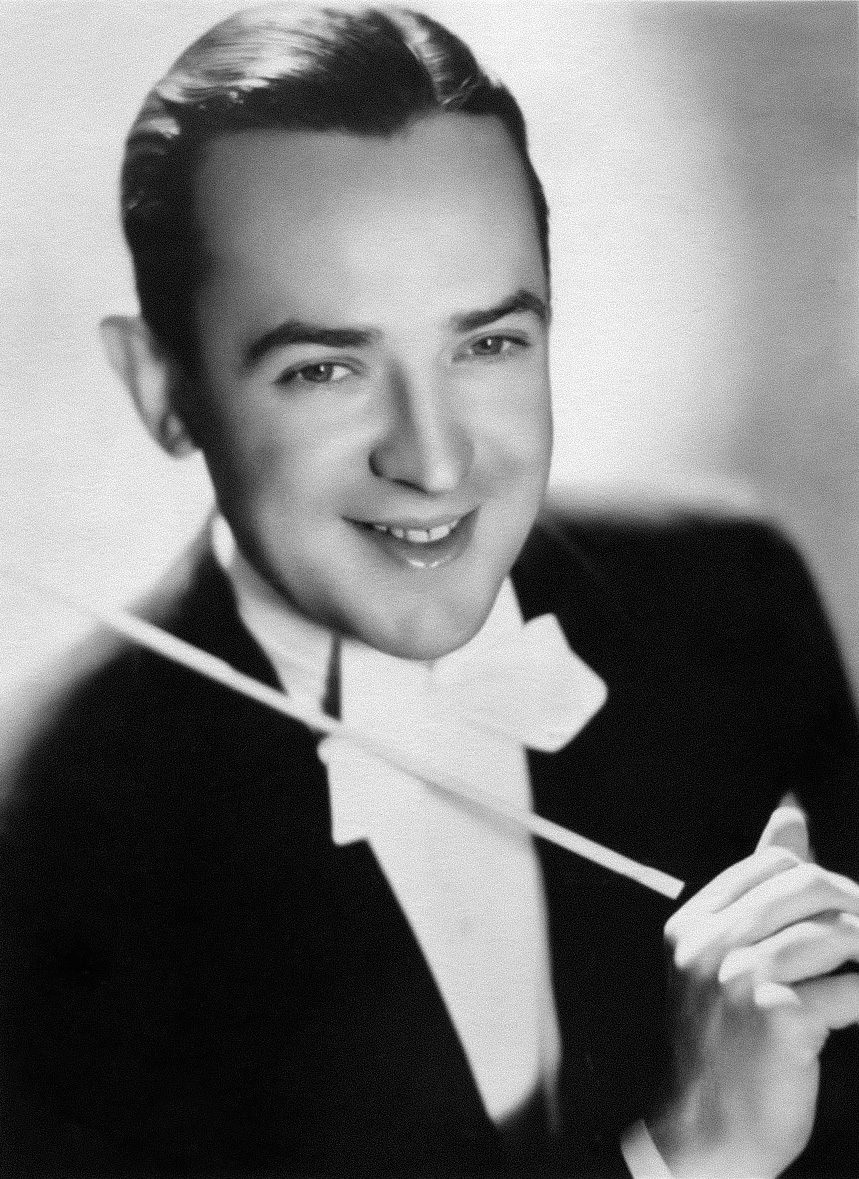
Jimmy Dorsey remained at the top of the Billboard number-one singles chart for 32 weeks.

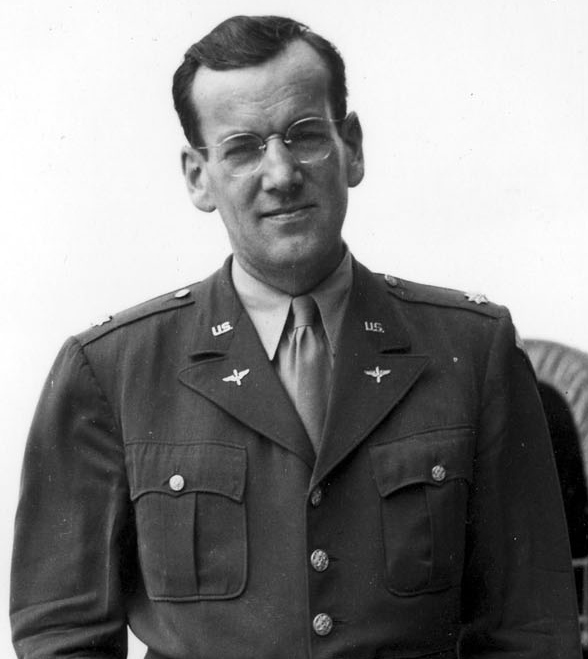
Glenn Miller remained at the top of the Billboard number-one singles chart for 31 weeks.

#	Reached number one	Artist(s)	Single	Record label	Weeks at number one	Ref
1940
1	July 27, 1940	Tommy Dorsey	"I'll Never Smile Again"	Victor	12	
2	October 19, 1940	Bing Crosby	"Only Forever"	Decca	9	
3	December 21, 1940	Artie Shaw	"Frenesi"	Victor	12	
1941
4	March 15, 1941	Glenn Miller	"Song of the Volga Boatmen"	Bluebird	1	
re	March 22, 1941	Artie Shaw	"Frenesi"	Victor	1	
5	March 29, 1941	Jimmy Dorsey	"Amapola (Pretty Little Poppy)"	Decca	10	
6	June 7, 1941	Jimmy Dorsey	"My Sister and I"	Decca	1	
7	June 14, 1941	Jimmy Dorsey	"Maria Elena"	Decca	1	
8	June 21, 1941	Sammy Kaye	"Daddy (Papito)"	Victor	1	
re	June 28, 1941	Jimmy Dorsey	"My Sister and I"	Decca	1	
re	July 5, 1941	Jimmy Dorsey	"Maria Elena"	Decca	1	
re	July 12, 1941	Sammy Kaye	"Daddy (Papito)"	Victor	7	
9	August 30, 1941	Jimmy Dorsey	"Green Eyes (Aquellos Ojos Verdes)"	Decca	4	
10	September 27, 1941	Jimmy Dorsey	"Blue Champagne"	Decca	1	
11	October 4, 1941	Freddy Martin	"Piano Concerto in B Flat"	Bluebird	8	
12	November 29, 1941	Glenn Miller	"Chattanooga Choo Choo"	Bluebird	3	
13	December 20, 1941	Glenn Miller	"Elmer's Tune"	Bluebird	1	
re	December 27, 1941	Glenn Miller	"Chattanooga Choo Choo"	Bluebird	6	
1942
14	February 7, 1942	Glenn Miller	"A String of Pearls"	Bluebird	1	
15	February 14, 1942	Woody Herman	"Blues in the Night"	Decca	1	
re	February 21, 1942	Glenn Miller	"A String of Pearls"	Bluebird	1	
16	February 28, 1942	Glenn Miller	"Moonlight Cocktail"	Bluebird	10	
17	May 9, 1942	Jimmy Dorsey	"Tangerine"	Decca	6	
18	June 20, 1942	Harry James	"Sleepy Lagoon"	Columbia	4	
19	July 18, 1942	Kay Kyser	"Jingle Jangle Jingle"	Columbia	8	
20	September 12, 1942	Glenn Miller	"(I've Got a Gal In) Kalamazoo"	Victor	7	
21	October 31, 1942	Bing Crosby	"White Christmas"	Decca	11	
1943
22	January 16, 1943	Tommy Dorsey	"There Are Such Things"	Victor	4	
23	February 13, 1943	Harry James	"I Had the Craziest Dream"	Columbia	2	
re	February 27, 1943	Tommy Dorsey	"There Are Such Things"	Victor	1	
24	March 6, 1943	Harry James	"I've Heard That Song Before"	Columbia	12	
25	May 29, 1943	Glenn Miller	"That Old Black Magic"	Victor	1	
re	June 5, 1943	Harry James	"I've Heard That Song Before"	Columbia	1	
26	June 12, 1943	Benny Goodman	"Taking A Chance On Love"	Columbia	3	
27	July 3, 1943	The Song Spinners	"Comin' In On A Wing And A Prayer"	Decca	3	
28	July 24, 1943	Dick Haymes	"You'll Never Know"	Decca	4	
29	August 21, 1943	Tommy Dorsey	"In the Blue of Evening"	Victor	3	
30	September 11, 1943	Bing Crosby	"Sunday, Monday Or Always"	Decca	7	
31	October 30, 1943	Al Dexter	"Pistol Packin' Mama"	Okeh	1	
32	November 6, 1943	Mills Brothers	"Paper Doll"	Decca	12	
1944
33	January 29, 1944	Glen Gray	"My Heart Tells Me (Should I Believe My Heart?)"	Decca	5	
34	March 4, 1944	Jimmy Dorsey	"Besame Mucho (Kiss Me Much)"	Decca	7	
35	April 22, 1944	Guy Lombardo	"It's Love-Love-Love"	Decca	2	
36	May 6, 1944	Bing Crosby	"I Love You"	Decca	5	
37	June 10, 1944	Harry James	"I'll Get By (As Long as I Have You)"	Columbia	3	
38	July 1, 1944	Bing Crosby	"I'll Be Seeing You"	Decca	1	
re	July 8, 1944	Harry James	"I'll Get By (As Long as I Have You)"	Columbia	1	
re	July 15, 1944	Bing Crosby	"I'll Be Seeing You"	Decca	3	
39	August 5, 1944	Bing Crosby	"Swinging On A Star"	Decca	9	
40	October 7, 1944	Mills Brothers	"You Always Hurt The One You Love"	Decca	1	
41	October 14, 1944	Dinah Shore	"I'll Walk Alone"	Victor	1	
re	October 21, 1944	Mills Brothers	"You Always Hurt The One You Love"	Decca	2	
re	November 4, 1944	Dinah Shore	"I'll Walk Alone"	Victor	3	
re	November 25, 1944	Mills Brothers	"You Always Hurt The One You Love"	Decca	2	
42	December 9, 1944	The Ink Spots and Ella Fitzgerald	"I'm Making Believe"	Decca	2	
43	December 23, 1944	Bing Crosby and The Andrews Sisters	"Don't Fence Me In"	Decca	8	
1945
44	February 17, 1945	The Andrews Sisters	"Rum and Coca-Cola"	Decca	7	
45	April 7, 1945	Les Brown & Doris Day	"My Dreams Are Getting Better All The Time"	Columbia	7	
46	May 26, 1945	Les Brown & Doris Day	"Sentimental Journey"	Columbia	9	
47	July 28, 1945	Johnny Mercer	"On the Atchison, Topeka and the Santa Fe"	Capitol	7	
48	September 15, 1945	Perry Como	"Till The End Of Time"	Victor	9	
49	November 17, 1945	Sammy Kaye	"Chickery Chick"	Victor	1	
50	November 24, 1945	Harry James	"It's Been A Long, Long Time"	Columbia	2	
51	December 8, 1945	Bing Crosby and The Les Paul Trio	"It's Been A Long, Long Time"	Decca	1	
re	December 15, 1945	Sammy Kaye	"Chickery Chick"	Victor	1	
re	December 22, 1945	Harry James	"It's Been A Long, Long Time"	Columbia	1	
re	December 29, 1945	Sammy Kaye	"Chickery Chick"	Victor	1	
1946
52	January 5, 1946	Freddy Martin	"Symphony"	Victor	2	
53	January 19, 1946	Bing Crosby and Carmen Cavallaro	"I Can't Begin To Tell You"	Decca	1	
54	January 26, 1946	Vaughn Monroe	"Let It Snow! Let It Snow! Let It Snow!"	Victor	5	
55	March 2, 1946	Betty Hutton	"Doctor, Lawyer, Indian Chief"	Capitol	1	
56	March 9, 1946	Johnny Mercer	"Personality"	Capitol	1	
57	March 16, 1946	Frankie Carle	"Oh! What it Seemed to Be"	Columbia	6	
58	April 27, 1946	Sammy Kaye	"I'm A Big Girl Now"	RCA Victor	1	
59	May 4, 1946	Perry Como	"Prisoner of Love"♪	RCA Victor	3	
60	May 25, 1946	The Ink Spots	"The Gypsy"	Decca	10	
61	August 3, 1946	Perry Como	"Surrender"	RCA Victor	1	
62	August 10, 1946	Eddy Howard	"To Each His Own"	Majestic	3	
63	August 31, 1946	Freddy Martin	"To Each His Own"	RCA Victor	2	
64	September 14, 1946	Frank Sinatra	"Five Minutes More"	Columbia	1	
65	September 21, 1946	The Ink Spots	"To Each His Own"	Decca	1	
re	September 28, 1946	Frank Sinatra	"Five Minutes More"	Columbia	1	
re	October 5, 1946	Eddy Howard	"To Each His Own"	Majestic	2	
66	October 19, 1946	Frankie Carle	"Rumors Are Flying"	Columbia	8	
67	December 14, 1946	Kay Kyser	"Ole Buttermilk Sky"	Columbia	2	
68	December 28, 1946	Sammy Kaye	"The Old Lamp-Lighter"	RCA Victor	7	
1947
69	February 15, 1947	The King Cole Trio	"(I Love You) For Sentimental Reasons"	Capitol	1	
70	February 22, 1947	Count Basie	"Open The Door, Richard!"	RCA Victor	1	
71	March 1, 1947	Freddy Martin	"Managua, Nicaragua"	RCA Victor	2	
72	March 15, 1947	Ted Weems	"Heartaches"	RCA Victor	12	
73	June 7, 1947	Art Lund	"Mam'selle"	MGM	2	
74	June 21, 1947	The Harmonicats	"Peg O' My Heart"	Vitacoustic	1	
75	June 28, 1947	Perry Como	"Chi-Baba, Chi-Baba (My Bambino Go to Sleep)"	RCA Victor	3	
re	July 19, 1947	The Harmonicats	"Peg O' My Heart"	Vitacoustic	3	
76	August 9, 1947	Tex Williams	"Smoke! Smoke! Smoke! (That Cigarette)"	Capitol	6	
77	September 20, 1947	Francis Craig	"Near You"♪	Bullet	12	
78	December 13, 1947	Vaughn Monroe	"Ballerina"	RCA Victor	10	
1948
79	February 21, 1948	Art Mooney	"I'm Looking Over a Four Leaf Clover"	MGM	3	
80	March 13, 1948	Peggy Lee	"Mañana (Is Soon Enough for Me)"	Capitol	9	
81	May 15, 1948	Nat King Cole	"Nature Boy"	Capitol	7	
82	July 3, 1948	Kay Kyser	"Woody Wood-Pecker"	Columbia	6	
83	August 14, 1948	Al Trace	"You Call Everybody Darlin'"	Regent	2	
84	August 28, 1948	Pee Wee Hunt	"Twelfth Street Rag"	Capitol	6	
85	October 9, 1948	Margaret Whiting	"A Tree In The Meadow"	Capitol	2	
re	October 23, 1948	Pee Wee Hunt	"Twelfth Street Rag"♪	Capitol	2	
86	November 6, 1948	Dinah Shore	"Buttons And Bows"	Columbia	9	
1949
87	January 8, 1949	Spike Jones	"All I Want For Christmas (Is My Two Front Teeth)"	RCA Victor	1	
re	January 15, 1949	Dinah Shore	"Buttons and Bows"	Columbia	1	
88	January 22, 1949	Evelyn Knight	"A Little Bird Told Me"	Decca	7	
89	March 12, 1949	Blue Barron	"Cruising Down the River"	MGM	2	
90	March 26, 1949	Russ Morgan	"Cruising Down the River"	Decca	7	
91	May 14, 1949	Vaughn Monroe	"Riders in the Sky (A Cowboy Legend)"♪	RCA Victor	11	
92	July 30, 1949	Perry Como	"Some Enchanted Evening"	RCA Victor	5	
93	September 3, 1949	Vic Damone	"You're Breaking My Heart"	Mercury	4	
94	October 1, 1949	Frankie Laine	"That Lucky Old Sun"	Mercury	8	
95	November 26, 1949	Frankie Laine	"Mule Train"	Mercury	6	

== Statistics by decade ==
=== By artist ===
The following artists achieved three or more number-one hits from 1940 to 1949. A number of artists had number-one singles on their own, as well as part of a collaboration.

Artist	Number-one singles	Singles
Bing Crosby	9	"Only Forever" "White Christmas" "Sunday, Monday Or Always" "I Love You" "I'll Be Seeing You" "Swinging On A Star" "Don't Fence Me In" "It's Been A Long, Long Time" "I Can't Begin To Tell You"
Jimmy Dorsey	7	"Amapola (Pretty Little Poppy)" "My Sister and I" "Maria Elena" "Green Eyes (Aquellos Ojos Verdes)" "Blue Champagne" "Tangerine" "Besame Mucho (Kiss Me Much)"
Glenn Miller	7	"Song of the Volga Boatmen" "Chattanooga Choo Choo" "Elmer's Tune" "A String of Pearls" "Moonlight Cocktail" "(I've Got a Gal In) Kalamazoo" "That Old Black Magic"
Harry James	5	"Sleepy Lagoon" "I Had the Craziest Dream" "I've Heard That Song Before" "I'll Get By (As Long as I Have You)" "It's Been A Long, Long Time"
Perry Como	5	"Till The End Of Time" "Prisoner of Love" "Surrender" "Chi-Baba, Chi-Baba (My Bambino Go to Sleep)" "Some Enchanted Evening"
Sammy Kaye	4	"Daddy (Papito)" "Chickery Chick" "I'm A Big Girl Now" "The Old Lamp-Lighter"
Freddy Martin	4	"Piano Concerto in B Flat" "Symphony" "To Each His Own" "Managua, Nicaragua"
Vaughn Monroe	3	"Let It Snow! Let It Snow! Let It Snow!" "Ballerina" "Riders in the Sky (A Cowboy Legend)"
Tommy Dorsey	3	"I'll Never Smile Again" "There Are Such Things" "In the Blue of Evening"
Kay Kyser	3	"Jingle Jangle Jingle" "Ole Buttermilk Sky" "Woody Wood-Pecker"
The Ink Spots	3	"I'm Making Believe" "The Gypsy" "To Each His Own"

=== Artists by total number of weeks at number-one ===
The following artists were featured at the top of the chart for the highest total number of weeks from 1940 to 1949.

Artist	Weeks at number-one	Singles
Bing Crosby	55	"Only Forever" (9 weeks) ”White Christmas” (11 weeks) ”Sunday, Monday Or Always” (7 weeks) ”I Love You” (5 weeks) "I'll Be Seeing You" (4 weeks) “Swinging On A Star” (9 weeks) "Don't Fence Me In" (8 weeks) “It’s Been A Long, Long Time” (1 week) "I Can't Begin To Tell You" (1 week)
Jimmy Dorsey	32	"Amapola (Pretty Little Poppy)" (10 weeks) "My Sister and I" (2 weeks) "Maria Elena" (2 weeks) "Green Eyes (Aquellos Ojos Verdes)" (4 weeks) "Blue Champagne" (1 week) "Tangerine" (6 weeks) "Besame Mucho (Kiss Me Much)" (7 weeks)
Glenn Miller	31	"Song of the Volga Boatmen" (1 week) "Chattanooga Choo Choo" (6 weeks) "Elmer's Tune" (1 week) "A String of Pearls" (2 weeks) "Moonlight Cocktail" (10 weeks) "(I've Got a Gal In) Kalamazoo" (7 weeks) "That Old Black Magic" (1 week)
Harry James	26	"Sleepy Lagoon" (4 weeks) "I Had the Craziest Dream" (2 weeks) "I've Heard That Song Before" (13 weeks) "I'll Get By (As Long as I Have You)" (4 weeks) "It's Been A Long, Long Time" (3 weeks)
Vaughn Monroe	26	"Let It Snow! Let It Snow! Let It Snow!" (5 weeks) "Ballerina" (10 weeks) "Riders in the Sky (A Cowboy Legend)" (11 weeks)
Perry Como	21	"Till The End Of Time" (9 weeks) "Prisoner of Love" (3 weeks) "Surrender" (1 week) "Chi-Baba, Chi-Baba (My Bambino Go to Sleep)" (3 weeks) "Some Enchanted Evening" (5 weeks)
Tommy Dorsey	20	"I'll Never Smile Again" (12 weeks) "There Are Such Things" (5 weeks) "In the Blue of Evening" (3 weeks)
Sammy Kaye	19	"Daddy (Papito)" (8 weeks) "Chickery Chick" (3 weeks) "I'm A Big Girl Now" (1 week) "The Old Lamp-Lighter" (7 weeks)
Mills Brothers	17	"Paper Doll" (12 weeks) "You Always Hurt The One You Love" (5 weeks)
Les Brown	16	"My Dreams Are Getting Better All The Time" (7 weeks) "Sentimental Journey" (9 weeks)

=== Singles by total number of weeks at number-one ===
The following singles were featured at the top of the chart for the highest total number of weeks from 1940 to 1949.

Weeks at number one	Song	Artist(s)
13	"Frenesi"	Artie Shaw
13	"I've Heard That Song Before"	Harry James
12	"Heartaches"	Ted Weems
12	"Near You"	Francis Craig
12	"Paper Doll"	Mills Brothers
12	"I'll Never Smile Again"	Tommy Dorsey
11	"Riders in the Sky"	Vaughn Monroe
11	"White Christmas"	Bing Crosby
10	"Amapola"	Jimmy Dorsey
10	"Moonlight Cocktail"	Glenn Miller
10	"The Gypsy"	The Ink Spots
10	"Ballerina"	Vaughn Monroe

== See also ==
- Lists of Billboard number-one singles
- 1940s in music
