= Lists of Billboard number-one singles =

This is a list of songs that have peaked at number one on the Billboard Hot 100 and the magazine's national singles charts that preceded it. Introduced in 1958, the Hot 100 is the pre-eminent singles chart in the United States, currently monitoring the most popular singles in terms of popular radio play, single purchases and online streaming.

== Preface ==
The following year-by-year, week-by-week listings are based on data accrued by Billboard magazine before and after the inception of its Hot 100 popularity chart in August 1958.

All data is pooled from record purchases and radio/jukebox play within the United States. Later charts also include digital single sales, online streaming, and YouTube hits.

== Pre-Hot 100 era ==
- 1940
- 1941
- 1942
- 1943
- 1944
- 1945
- 1946
- 1947
- 1948
- 1949
- 1950
- 1951
- 1952
- 1953
- 1954
- 1955
- 1956
- 1957
- 1958

== Hot 100 era ==
- 1958
- 1959
- 1960
- 1961
- 1962
- 1963
- 1964
- 1965
- 1966
- 1967
- 1968
- 1969
- 1970
- 1971
- 1972
- 1973
- 1974
- 1975
- 1976
- 1977
- 1978
- 1979
- 1980
- 1981
- 1982
- 1983
- 1984
- 1985
- 1986
- 1987
- 1988
- 1989
- 1990
- 1991
- 1992
- 1993
- 1994
- 1995
- 1996
- 1997
- 1998
- 1999
- 2000
- 2001
- 2002
- 2003
- 2004
- 2005
- 2006
- 2007
- 2008
- 2009
- 2010
- 2011
- 2012
- 2013
- 2014
- 2015
- 2016
- 2017
- 2018
- 2019
- 2020
- 2021
- 2022
- 2023
- 2024
- 2025
- 2026

== By decade ==
=== Pre-Hot 100 era ===
- 1940s
- 1950–1958

=== Hot 100 era ===
- 1958–1969
- 1970s
- 1980s
- 1990s
- 2000s
- 2010s
- 2020s

== Sources ==
The following sources apply to all "by year" pages linked above:

- Fred Bronson's Billboard Book of Number 1 Hits, 5th Edition (ISBN 0-8230-7677-6)
- Joel Whitburn's Top Pop Singles 1955-2008, 12th Edition (ISBN 0-89820-180-2)
- Joel Whitburn Presents the Billboard Pop Charts, 1955-1959 (ISBN 0-89820-092-X)
- Joel Whitburn Presents the Billboard Hot 100 Charts: The Sixties (ISBN 0-89820-074-1)
- Joel Whitburn Presents the Billboard Hot 100 Charts: The Seventies (ISBN 0-89820-076-8)
- Joel Whitburn Presents the Billboard Hot 100 Charts: The Eighties (ISBN 0-89820-079-2)
- Joel Whitburn Presents the Billboard Hot 100 Charts: The Nineties (ISBN 0-89820-137-3)
- Joel Whitburn Presents the Billboard Hot 100 Charts: The 2000s (ISBN 0-89820-182-9)
- Additional information obtained can be verified within Billboard's online archive services and print editions of the magazine.

== See also ==
- List of Billboard Hot 100 top-ten singles
- List of number-one adult contemporary hits (United States)
- List of number-one country hits (United States)
- List of number-one dance hits (United States)
- List of number-one dance airplay hits (U.S.)
- List of Billboard Mainstream Rock number-one songs of the 1980s
- List of number-one alternative hits (United States)
- List of number-one rhythm and blues hits (United States)
- List of artists who reached number one in the United States
- Billboard Year-End
