= List of Billboard number-one singles of 1945 =

Prior to the introduction of the Hot 100, The Billboard compiled multiple weekly record charts ranking the performance of singles in the United States. In 1945, the magazine published the following four all-genre national singles charts:

- Best-Selling Popular Retail Records (named National Best Selling Retail Records until March 31) – ranked the most-sold singles in retail stores, as reported by merchants surveyed throughout the country. In the 21st century, Billboard designates Retail Records, in all its incarnations, as the magazine's canonical U.S. singles chart prior to August 1958.
- Records Most-Played on the Air (introduced January 27 as Disks with Most Radio Plugs) – ranked the most-played songs on American radio stations, as reported by radio disc jockeys and radio stations.
- Most-Played Juke Box Records – ranked the most-played songs in jukeboxes across the United States, as reported by machine operators.
- Honor Roll of Hits (introduced March 24) – a composite ten-position song chart which combined data from the three charts above along with three other component charts. It served as The Billboard's lead chart until the introduction of the Hot 100 in 1958 and would remain in print until 1963.

Note: In the issues dated February 10, April 14, May 5, and November 17, The Billboard reported a tie for the number-one single on one of its charts.

Issue date	Best-Selling Popular Retail Records	Records Most-Played on the Air	Most-Played Juke Box Records	Honor Roll of Hits	Ref.
January 6	"Don't Fence Me In"; Bing Crosby and the Andrews Sisters with Vic Schoen and His Orchestra	Introduced on January 27	"Don't Fence Me In"; Bing Crosby and the Andrews Sisters with Vic Schoen and His Orchestra	Introduced on March 24	
January 13	"Don't Fence Me In"; Bing Crosby and the Andrews Sisters with Vic Schoen and His Orchestra	Introduced on January 27	"Don't Fence Me In"; Bing Crosby and the Andrews Sisters with Vic Schoen and His Orchestra	Introduced on March 24	
January 20	"Don't Fence Me In"; Bing Crosby and the Andrews Sisters with Vic Schoen and His Orchestra	Introduced on January 27	"Don't Fence Me In"; Bing Crosby and the Andrews Sisters with Vic Schoen and His Orchestra	Introduced on March 24	
January 27	"Don't Fence Me In"; Bing Crosby and the Andrews Sisters with Vic Schoen and His Orchestra	"Don't Fence Me In"; Bing Crosby and the Andrews Sisters with Vic Schoen and His Orchestra	"Don't Fence Me In"; Bing Crosby and the Andrews Sisters with Vic Schoen and His Orchestra	Introduced on March 24	
February 3	"Don't Fence Me In"; Bing Crosby and the Andrews Sisters with Vic Schoen and His Orchestra	"Don't Fence Me In"; Bing Crosby and the Andrews Sisters with Vic Schoen and His Orchestra	"Don't Fence Me In"; Bing Crosby and the Andrews Sisters with Vic Schoen and His Orchestra	Introduced on March 24	
February 10	"Don't Fence Me In"; Bing Crosby and the Andrews Sisters with Vic Schoen and His Orchestra "Rum and Coca-Cola"; The Andrews Sisters with Vic Schoen and His Orchestra	"Don't Fence Me In"; Bing Crosby and the Andrews Sisters with Vic Schoen and His Orchestra	"Rum and Coca-Cola"; The Andrews Sisters with Vic Schoen and His Orchestra	Introduced on March 24	
February 17	"Rum and Coca-Cola"; The Andrews Sisters with Vic Schoen and His Orchestra	"Don't Fence Me In"; Bing Crosby and the Andrews Sisters with Vic Schoen and His Orchestra	"Rum and Coca-Cola"; The Andrews Sisters with Vic Schoen and His Orchestra	Introduced on March 24	
February 24	"Rum and Coca-Cola"; The Andrews Sisters with Vic Schoen and His Orchestra	"Don't Fence Me In"; Bing Crosby and the Andrews Sisters with Vic Schoen and His Orchestra	"Rum and Coca-Cola"; The Andrews Sisters with Vic Schoen and His Orchestra	Introduced on March 24	
March 3	"Rum and Coca-Cola"; The Andrews Sisters with Vic Schoen and His Orchestra	"Don't Fence Me In"; Bing Crosby and the Andrews Sisters with Vic Schoen and His Orchestra	"Rum and Coca-Cola"; The Andrews Sisters with Vic Schoen and His Orchestra	Introduced on March 24	
March 10	"Rum and Coca-Cola"; The Andrews Sisters with Vic Schoen and His Orchestra	"Don't Fence Me In"; Bing Crosby and the Andrews Sisters with Vic Schoen and His Orchestra	"Rum and Coca-Cola"; The Andrews Sisters with Vic Schoen and His Orchestra	Introduced on March 24	
March 17	"Rum and Coca-Cola"; The Andrews Sisters with Vic Schoen and His Orchestra	"Ac-Cent-Tchu-Ate the Positive"; Johnny Mercer and the Pied Pipers with Paul Weston and His Orchestra	"Rum and Coca-Cola"; The Andrews Sisters with Vic Schoen and His Orchestra	Introduced on March 24	
March 24	"Rum and Coca-Cola"; The Andrews Sisters with Vic Schoen and His Orchestra	"Ac-Cent-Tchu-Ate the Positive"; Johnny Mercer and the Pied Pipers with Paul Weston and His Orchestra	"Rum and Coca-Cola"; The Andrews Sisters with Vic Schoen and His Orchestra	"Ac-Cent-Tchu-Ate the Positive"	
March 31	"Rum and Coca-Cola"; The Andrews Sisters with Vic Schoen and His Orchestra	"Candy"; Johnny Mercer, Jo Stafford and the Pied Pipers with Paul Weston and His Orchestra	"Rum and Coca-Cola"; The Andrews Sisters with Vic Schoen and His Orchestra	"My Dreams Are Getting Better All the Time"	
April 7	"My Dreams Are Getting Better All the Time"; Les Brown and His Orchestra with Doris Day	"My Dreams Are Getting Better All the Time"; Les Brown and His Orchestra with Doris Day	"Rum and Coca-Cola"; The Andrews Sisters with Vic Schoen and His Orchestra	"My Dreams Are Getting Better All the Time"	
April 14	"My Dreams Are Getting Better All the Time"; Les Brown and His Orchestra with Doris Day	"My Dreams Are Getting Better All the Time"; Les Brown and His Orchestra with Doris Day "I'm Beginning to See the Light"; Harry James and His Orchestra with Kitty Kallen	"Rum and Coca-Cola"; The Andrews Sisters with Vic Schoen and His Orchestra	"My Dreams Are Getting Better All the Time"	
April 21	"My Dreams Are Getting Better All the Time"; Les Brown and His Orchestra with Doris Day	"My Dreams Are Getting Better All the Time"; Les Brown and His Orchestra with Doris Day	"My Dreams Are Getting Better All the Time"; Les Brown and His Orchestra with Doris Day	"My Dreams Are Getting Better All the Time"	
April 28	"My Dreams Are Getting Better All the Time"; Les Brown and His Orchestra with Doris Day	"I'm Beginning to See the Light"; Harry James and His Orchestra with Kitty Kallen	"My Dreams Are Getting Better All the Time"; Les Brown and His Orchestra with Doris Day	"My Dreams Are Getting Better All the Time"	
May 5	"My Dreams Are Getting Better All the Time"; Les Brown and His Orchestra with Doris Day	"Dream"; The Pied Pipers with Paul Weston and His Orchestra "Sentimental Journey"; Les Brown and His Orchestra with Doris Day	"My Dreams Are Getting Better All the Time"; Les Brown and His Orchestra with Doris Day	"My Dreams Are Getting Better All the Time"	
May 12	"My Dreams Are Getting Better All the Time"; Les Brown and His Orchestra with Doris Day	"There! I've Said It Again"; Vaughn Monroe and His Orchestra with Vaughn Monroe and the Norton Sisters	"My Dreams Are Getting Better All the Time"; Les Brown and His Orchestra with Doris Day	"My Dreams Are Getting Better All the Time"	
May 19	"My Dreams Are Getting Better All the Time"; Les Brown and His Orchestra with Doris Day	"There! I've Said It Again"; Vaughn Monroe and His Orchestra with Vaughn Monroe and the Norton Sisters	"My Dreams Are Getting Better All the Time"; Les Brown and His Orchestra with Doris Day	"My Dreams Are Getting Better All the Time"	
May 26	"Sentimental Journey"; Les Brown and His Orchestra with Doris Day	"There! I've Said It Again"; Vaughn Monroe and His Orchestra with Vaughn Monroe and the Norton Sisters	"My Dreams Are Getting Better All the Time"; Les Brown and His Orchestra with Doris Day	"My Dreams Are Getting Better All the Time"	
June 2	"Sentimental Journey"; Les Brown and His Orchestra with Doris Day	"There! I've Said It Again"; Vaughn Monroe and His Orchestra with Vaughn Monroe and the Norton Sisters	"My Dreams Are Getting Better All the Time"; Les Brown and His Orchestra with Doris Day	"Sentimental Journey"	
June 9	"Sentimental Journey"; Les Brown and His Orchestra with Doris Day	"There! I've Said It Again"; Vaughn Monroe and His Orchestra with Vaughn Monroe and the Norton Sisters	"Candy"; Johnny Mercer, Jo Stafford and the Pied Pipers with Paul Weston and His Orchestra	"Sentimental Journey"	
June 16	"Sentimental Journey"; Les Brown and His Orchestra with Doris Day	"Sentimental Journey"; Les Brown and His Orchestra with Doris Day	"Sentimental Journey"; Les Brown and His Orchestra with Doris Day	"Sentimental Journey"	
June 23	"Sentimental Journey"; Les Brown and His Orchestra with Doris Day	"Sentimental Journey"; Les Brown and His Orchestra with Doris Day	"Sentimental Journey"; Les Brown and His Orchestra with Doris Day	"Sentimental Journey"	
June 30	"Sentimental Journey"; Les Brown and His Orchestra with Doris Day	"Sentimental Journey"; Les Brown and His Orchestra with Doris Day	"Sentimental Journey"; Les Brown and His Orchestra with Doris Day	"Sentimental Journey"	
July 7	"Sentimental Journey"; Les Brown and His Orchestra with Doris Day	"Sentimental Journey"; Les Brown and His Orchestra with Doris Day	"Sentimental Journey"; Les Brown and His Orchestra with Doris Day	"Sentimental Journey"	
July 14	"Sentimental Journey"; Les Brown and His Orchestra with Doris Day	"Sentimental Journey"; Les Brown and His Orchestra with Doris Day	"Sentimental Journey"; Les Brown and His Orchestra with Doris Day	"Sentimental Journey"	
July 21	"Sentimental Journey"; Les Brown and His Orchestra with Doris Day	"Sentimental Journey"; Les Brown and His Orchestra with Doris Day	"Sentimental Journey"; Les Brown and His Orchestra with Doris Day	"Sentimental Journey"	
July 28	"On the Atchison, Topeka and the Santa Fe"; Johnny Mercer and the Pied Pipers with Paul Weston and His Orchestra	"There! I've Said It Again"; Vaughn Monroe and His Orchestra with Vaughn Monroe and the Norton Sisters	"Sentimental Journey"; Les Brown and His Orchestra with Doris Day	"Sentimental Journey"	
August 4	"On the Atchison, Topeka and the Santa Fe"; Johnny Mercer and the Pied Pipers with Paul Weston and His Orchestra	"On the Atchison, Topeka and the Santa Fe"; Johnny Mercer and the Pied Pipers with Paul Weston and His Orchestra	"On the Atchison, Topeka and the Santa Fe"; Johnny Mercer and the Pied Pipers with Paul Weston and His Orchestra	"Sentimental Journey"	
August 11	"On the Atchison, Topeka and the Santa Fe"; Johnny Mercer and the Pied Pipers with Paul Weston and His Orchestra	"On the Atchison, Topeka and the Santa Fe"; Johnny Mercer and the Pied Pipers with Paul Weston and His Orchestra	"On the Atchison, Topeka and the Santa Fe"; Johnny Mercer and the Pied Pipers with Paul Weston and His Orchestra	"On the Atchison, Topeka and the Santa Fe"	
August 18	"On the Atchison, Topeka and the Santa Fe"; Johnny Mercer and the Pied Pipers with Paul Weston and His Orchestra	"On the Atchison, Topeka and the Santa Fe"; Johnny Mercer and the Pied Pipers with Paul Weston and His Orchestra	"On the Atchison, Topeka and the Santa Fe"; Johnny Mercer and the Pied Pipers with Paul Weston and His Orchestra	"On the Atchison, Topeka and the Santa Fe"	
August 25	"On the Atchison, Topeka and the Santa Fe"; Johnny Mercer and the Pied Pipers with Paul Weston and His Orchestra	"On the Atchison, Topeka and the Santa Fe"; Johnny Mercer and the Pied Pipers with Paul Weston and His Orchestra	"On the Atchison, Topeka and the Santa Fe"; Johnny Mercer and the Pied Pipers with Paul Weston and His Orchestra	"On the Atchison, Topeka and the Santa Fe"	
September 1	"On the Atchison, Topeka and the Santa Fe"; Johnny Mercer and the Pied Pipers with Paul Weston and His Orchestra	"On the Atchison, Topeka and the Santa Fe"; Johnny Mercer and the Pied Pipers with Paul Weston and His Orchestra	"On the Atchison, Topeka and the Santa Fe"; Johnny Mercer and the Pied Pipers with Paul Weston and His Orchestra	"On the Atchison, Topeka and the Santa Fe"	
September 8	"On the Atchison, Topeka and the Santa Fe"; Johnny Mercer and the Pied Pipers with Paul Weston and His Orchestra	"On the Atchison, Topeka and the Santa Fe"; Johnny Mercer and the Pied Pipers with Paul Weston and His Orchestra	"On the Atchison, Topeka and the Santa Fe"; Johnny Mercer and the Pied Pipers with Paul Weston and His Orchestra	"On the Atchison, Topeka and the Santa Fe"	
September 15	"Till the End of Time"; Perry Como with Russ Case and His Orchestra	"Till the End of Time"; Perry Como with Russ Case and His Orchestra	"On the Atchison, Topeka and the Santa Fe"; Johnny Mercer and the Pied Pipers with Paul Weston and His Orchestra	"On the Atchison, Topeka and the Santa Fe"	
September 22	"Till the End of Time"; Perry Como with Russ Case and His Orchestra	"Till the End of Time"; Perry Como with Russ Case and His Orchestra	"On the Atchison, Topeka and the Santa Fe"; Johnny Mercer and the Pied Pipers with Paul Weston and His Orchestra	"Till the End of Time"	
September 29	"Till the End of Time"; Perry Como with Russ Case and His Orchestra	"Till the End of Time"; Perry Como with Russ Case and His Orchestra	"Till the End of Time"; Perry Como with Russ Case and His Orchestra	"Till the End of Time"	
October 6	"Till the End of Time"; Perry Como with Russ Case and His Orchestra	"Till the End of Time"; Perry Como with Russ Case and His Orchestra	"Till the End of Time"; Perry Como with Russ Case and His Orchestra	"Till the End of Time"	
October 13	"Till the End of Time"; Perry Como with Russ Case and His Orchestra	"Till the End of Time"; Perry Como with Russ Case and His Orchestra	"Till the End of Time"; Perry Como with Russ Case and His Orchestra	"Till the End of Time"	
October 20	"Till the End of Time"; Perry Como with Russ Case and His Orchestra	"Till the End of Time"; Perry Como with Russ Case and His Orchestra	"Till the End of Time"; Perry Como with Russ Case and His Orchestra	"Till the End of Time"	
October 27	"Till the End of Time"; Perry Como with Russ Case and His Orchestra	"Till the End of Time"; Perry Como with Russ Case and His Orchestra	"Till the End of Time"; Perry Como with Russ Case and His Orchestra	"Till the End of Time"	
November 3	"Till the End of Time"; Perry Como with Russ Case and His Orchestra	"Till the End of Time"; Perry Como with Russ Case and His Orchestra	"Till the End of Time"; Perry Como with Russ Case and His Orchestra	"Till the End of Time"	
November 10	"Till the End of Time"; Perry Como with Russ Case and His Orchestra	"Till the End of Time"; Perry Como with Russ Case and His Orchestra	"Till the End of Time"; Perry Como with Russ Case and His Orchestra	"Till the End of Time"	
November 17	"Till the End of Time"; Perry Como with Russ Case and His Orchestra "Chickery Chick"; Swing and Sway with Sammy Kaye with Nancy Norman, Billy Williams and the Kaye Choir	"Chickery Chick"; Swing and Sway with Sammy Kaye with Nancy Norman, Billy Williams and the Kaye Choir	"Till the End of Time"; Perry Como with Russ Case and His Orchestra	"It's Been a Long, Long Time"	
November 24	"It's Been a Long, Long Time"; Harry James and His Orchestra with Kitty Kallen	"It's Been a Long, Long Time"; Harry James and His Orchestra with Kitty Kallen	"Till the End of Time"; Perry Como with Russ Case and His Orchestra	"It's Been a Long, Long Time"	
December 1	"It's Been a Long, Long Time"; Harry James and His Orchestra with Kitty Kallen	"Chickery Chick"; Swing and Sway with Sammy Kaye with Nancy Norman, Billy Williams and the Kaye Choir	"It's Been a Long, Long Time"; Bing Crosby with Les Paul and His Trio	"It's Been a Long, Long Time"	
December 8	"It's Been a Long, Long Time"; Bing Crosby with Les Paul and His Trio	"Chickery Chick"; Swing and Sway with Sammy Kaye with Nancy Norman, Billy Williams and the Kaye Choir	"It's Been a Long, Long Time"; Bing Crosby with Les Paul and His Trio	"It's Been a Long, Long Time"	
December 15	"Chickery Chick"; Swing and Sway with Sammy Kaye with Nancy Norman, Billy Williams and the Kaye Choir	"Chickery Chick"; Swing and Sway with Sammy Kaye with Nancy Norman, Billy Williams and the Kaye Choir	"Chickery Chick"; Swing and Sway with Sammy Kaye with Nancy Norman, Billy Williams and the Kaye Choir	"It's Been a Long, Long Time"	
December 22	"It's Been a Long, Long Time"; Harry James and His Orchestra with Kitty Kallen	"It's Been a Long, Long Time"; Harry James and His Orchestra with Kitty Kallen	"I Can't Begin to Tell You"; Bing Crosby with Carmen Cavallaro	"It's Been a Long, Long Time"	
December 29	"Chickery Chick"; Swing and Sway with Sammy Kaye with Nancy Norman, Billy Williams and the Kaye Choir	"White Christmas"; Bing Crosby with the Ken Darby Singers and John Scott Trotter and His Orchestra	"Chickery Chick"; Swing and Sway with Sammy Kaye with Nancy Norman, Billy Williams and the Kaye Choir	"It's Been a Long, Long Time"	

== Number-one artists ==
List of number one artists by total weeks at number one
Artist	Weeks at #1
The Andrews Sisters	13
Perry Como	10
Bing Crosby	7
Johnny Mercer	7
Harry James	3
Sammy Kaye	3

== See also ==
- 1945 in music
