= List of Billboard number-one singles of 1943 =

This is a list of number-one songs in the United States during the year 1943 according to The Billboard.

The "National Best Selling Retail Records" chart was the first to poll retailers nationwide on record sales.

The new chart was billed as a "trade service feature," based on the "10 best selling records of the past week" at a selection of national retailers from New York to Los Angeles.

Shown is a list of songs that topped the National Best Selling Retail Records chart.

Issue date	Song	Artist(s)	Ref.
January 2	"White Christmas"	Bing Crosby with the Ken Darby Singers and John Scott Trotter and His Orchestra	
January 9	"White Christmas"	Bing Crosby with the Ken Darby Singers and John Scott Trotter and His Orchestra	
January 16	"There Are Such Things"	Tommy Dorsey and His Orchestra with Frank Sinatra and the Pied Pipers	
January 23	"There Are Such Things"	Tommy Dorsey and His Orchestra with Frank Sinatra and the Pied Pipers	
January 30	"There Are Such Things"	Tommy Dorsey and His Orchestra with Frank Sinatra and the Pied Pipers	
February 6	"There Are Such Things"	Tommy Dorsey and His Orchestra with Frank Sinatra and the Pied Pipers	
February 13	"I Had the Craziest Dream"	Harry James and His Orchestra with Helen Forrest	
February 20	"I Had the Craziest Dream"	Harry James and His Orchestra with Helen Forrest	
February 27	"There Are Such Things"	Tommy Dorsey and His Orchestra with Frank Sinatra and the Pied Pipers	
March 6	"I've Heard That Song Before"	Harry James and His Orchestra with Helen Forrest	
March 13	"I've Heard That Song Before"	Harry James and His Orchestra with Helen Forrest	
March 20	"I've Heard That Song Before"	Harry James and His Orchestra with Helen Forrest	
March 27	"I've Heard That Song Before"	Harry James and His Orchestra with Helen Forrest	
April 3	"I've Heard That Song Before"	Harry James and His Orchestra with Helen Forrest	
April 10	"I've Heard That Song Before"	Harry James and His Orchestra with Helen Forrest	
April 17	"I've Heard That Song Before"	Harry James and His Orchestra with Helen Forrest	
April 24	"I've Heard That Song Before"	Harry James and His Orchestra with Helen Forrest	
May 1	"I've Heard That Song Before"	Harry James and His Orchestra with Helen Forrest	
May 8	"I've Heard That Song Before"	Harry James and His Orchestra with Helen Forrest	
May 15	"I've Heard That Song Before"	Harry James and His Orchestra with Helen Forrest	
May 22	"I've Heard That Song Before"	Harry James and His Orchestra with Helen Forrest	
May 29	"That Old Black Magic"	Glenn Miller and His Orchestra with Skip Nelson and the Modernaires	
June 5	"I've Heard That Song Before"	Harry James and His Orchestra with Helen Forrest	
June 12	"Taking a Chance on Love"	Benny Goodman and His Orchestra with Helen Forrest	
June 19	"Taking a Chance on Love"	Benny Goodman and His Orchestra with Helen Forrest	
June 26	"Taking a Chance on Love"	Benny Goodman and His Orchestra with Helen Forrest	
July 3	"Comin' In on a Wing and a Prayer"	The Song Spinners	
July 10	"Comin' In on a Wing and a Prayer"	The Song Spinners	
July 17	"Comin' In on a Wing and a Prayer"	The Song Spinners	
July 24	"You'll Never Know"	Dick Haymes and the Song Spinners	
July 31	"You'll Never Know"	Dick Haymes and the Song Spinners	
August 7	"You'll Never Know"	Dick Haymes and the Song Spinners	
August 14	"You'll Never Know"	Dick Haymes and the Song Spinners	
August 21	"In the Blue of Evening"	Tommy Dorsey and His Orchestra with Frank Sinatra	
August 28	"In the Blue of Evening"	Tommy Dorsey and His Orchestra with Frank Sinatra	
September 4	"In the Blue of Evening"	Tommy Dorsey and His Orchestra with Frank Sinatra	
September 11	"Sunday, Monday or Always"	Bing Crosby and the Ken Darby Singers	
September 18	"Sunday, Monday or Always"	Bing Crosby and the Ken Darby Singers	
September 25	"Sunday, Monday or Always"	Bing Crosby and the Ken Darby Singers	
October 2	"Sunday, Monday or Always"	Bing Crosby and the Ken Darby Singers	
October 9	"Sunday, Monday or Always"	Bing Crosby and the Ken Darby Singers	
October 16	"Sunday, Monday or Always"	Bing Crosby and the Ken Darby Singers	
October 23	"Sunday, Monday or Always"	Bing Crosby and the Ken Darby Singers	
October 30	"Pistol Packin' Mama"	Al Dexter and His Troopers with Al Dexter	
November 6	"Paper Doll"	The Mills Brothers	
November 13	"Paper Doll"	The Mills Brothers	
November 20	"Paper Doll"	The Mills Brothers	
November 27	"Paper Doll"	The Mills Brothers	
December 4	"Paper Doll"	The Mills Brothers	
December 11	"Paper Doll"	The Mills Brothers	
December 18	"Paper Doll"	The Mills Brothers	
December 25	"Paper Doll"	The Mills Brothers	

== Number-one artists ==
List of number-one artists by total weeks at number one
Artists	Weeks at #1
Harry James	15
Bing Crosby	9
Tommy Dorsey	8
The Mills Brothers	8
Dick Haymes	4
Benny Goodman	3
The Song Spinners	3
Al Dexter & His Troopers	1
Glenn Miller	1

== See also ==
- 1943 in music
