= List of Billboard number-one singles of 1947 =

Prior to the introduction of the Hot 100, The Billboard compiled multiple weekly record charts ranking the performance of singles in the United States. In 1947, the magazine published the following four all-genre national singles charts:

- Best-Selling Popular Retail Records – ranked the most-sold singles in retail stores, as reported by merchants surveyed throughout the country. In the 21st century, Billboard designates Retail Records, in all its incarnations, as the magazine's canonical U.S. singles chart prior to August 1958.
- Records Most-Played on the Air – ranked the most-played songs on American radio stations, as reported by radio disc jockeys and radio stations.
- Most-Played Juke Box Records – ranked the most-played songs in jukeboxes across the United States, as reported by machine operators.
- Honor Roll of Hits – a composite ten-position song chart which combined data from the three charts above along with three other component charts. It served as The Billboard's lead chart until the introduction of the Hot 100 in 1958 and would remain in print until 1963.

Issue date	Best-Selling Popular Retail Records	Records Most-Played on the Air	Most-Played Juke Box Records	Honor Roll of Hits	Ref.
January 4	"The Old Lamp-Lighter"; Swing and Sway with Sammy Kaye with Billy Williams	"White Christmas"; Bing Crosby with the Ken Darby Singers and John Scott Trotter and His Orchestra	"The Old Lamp-Lighter"; Swing and Sway with Sammy Kaye with Billy Williams	"The Old Lamp-Lighter"	
January 11	"The Old Lamp-Lighter"; Swing and Sway with Sammy Kaye with Billy Williams	"(I Love You) For Sentimental Reasons"; The King Cole Trio	"The Old Lamp-Lighter"; Swing and Sway with Sammy Kaye with Billy Williams	"The Old Lamp-Lighter"	
January 18	"The Old Lamp-Lighter"; Swing and Sway with Sammy Kaye with Billy Williams	"The Old Lamp-Lighter"; Swing and Sway with Sammy Kaye with Billy Williams	"The Old Lamp-Lighter"; Swing and Sway with Sammy Kaye with Billy Williams	"The Old Lamp-Lighter"	
January 25	"The Old Lamp-Lighter"; Swing and Sway with Sammy Kaye with Billy Williams	"(I Love You) For Sentimental Reasons"; The King Cole Trio	"The Old Lamp-Lighter"; Swing and Sway with Sammy Kaye with Billy Williams	"The Old Lamp-Lighter"	
February 1	"The Old Lamp-Lighter"; Swing and Sway with Sammy Kaye with Billy Williams	"(I Love You) For Sentimental Reasons"; The King Cole Trio	"The Old Lamp-Lighter"; Swing and Sway with Sammy Kaye with Billy Williams	"(I Love You) For Sentimental Reasons"	
February 8	"The Old Lamp-Lighter"; Swing and Sway with Sammy Kaye with Billy Williams	"(I Love You) For Sentimental Reasons"; The King Cole Trio	"Huggin' and Chalkin'"; Hoagy Carmichael with the Chickadees and Vic Schoen and His Orchestra	"(I Love You) For Sentimental Reasons"	
February 15	"(I Love You) For Sentimental Reasons"; The King Cole Trio	"(I Love You) For Sentimental Reasons"; The King Cole Trio	"Huggin' and Chalkin'"; Hoagy Carmichael with the Chickadees and Vic Schoen and His Orchestra	"(I Love You) For Sentimental Reasons"	
February 22	"Open the Door, Richard!"; Count Basie and His Orchestra with Harry Edison and Bill Johnson	"Open the Door, Richard!"; Count Basie and His Orchestra with Harry Edison and Bill Johnson	"Managua, Nicaragua"; Freddy Martin and His Orchestra with Stuart Wade	"(I Love You) For Sentimental Reasons"	
March 1	"Managua, Nicaragua"; Freddy Martin and His Orchestra with Stuart Wade	"Open the Door, Richard!"; The Three Flames with "Tiger" Haynes	"Managua, Nicaragua"; Freddy Martin and His Orchestra with Stuart Wade	"Open the Door, Richard"	
March 8	"Managua, Nicaragua"; Freddy Martin and His Orchestra with Stuart Wade	"Anniversary Song"; Dinah Shore	"Managua, Nicaragua"; Freddy Martin and His Orchestra with Stuart Wade	"Anniversary Song"	
March 15	"Heartaches"; Ted Weems and His Orchestra with Elmo Tanner	"Anniversary Song"; Dinah Shore	"Managua, Nicaragua"; Guy Lombardo and His Royal Canadians with Don Rodney	"Anniversary Song"	
March 22	"Heartaches"; Ted Weems and His Orchestra with Elmo Tanner	"Heartaches"; Ted Weems and His Orchestra with Elmo Tanner	"Heartaches"; Ted Weems and His Orchestra with Elmo Tanner	"Anniversary Song"	
March 29	"Heartaches"; Ted Weems and His Orchestra with Elmo Tanner	"Heartaches"; Ted Weems and His Orchestra with Elmo Tanner	"Heartaches"; Ted Weems and His Orchestra with Elmo Tanner	"Anniversary Song"	
April 5	"Heartaches"; Ted Weems and His Orchestra with Elmo Tanner	"Heartaches"; Ted Weems and His Orchestra with Elmo Tanner	"Heartaches"; Ted Weems and His Orchestra with Elmo Tanner	"Anniversary Song"	
April 12	"Heartaches"; Ted Weems and His Orchestra with Elmo Tanner	"Heartaches"; Ted Weems and His Orchestra with Elmo Tanner	"Heartaches"; Ted Weems and His Orchestra with Elmo Tanner	"Anniversary Song"	
April 19	"Heartaches"; Ted Weems and His Orchestra with Elmo Tanner	"Heartaches"; Ted Weems and His Orchestra with Elmo Tanner	"Heartaches"; Ted Weems and His Orchestra with Elmo Tanner	"Heartaches"	
April 26	"Heartaches"; Ted Weems and His Orchestra with Elmo Tanner	"Heartaches"; Ted Weems and His Orchestra with Elmo Tanner	"Heartaches"; Ted Weems and His Orchestra with Elmo Tanner	"Heartaches"	
May 3	"Heartaches"; Ted Weems and His Orchestra with Elmo Tanner	"Heartaches"; Ted Weems and His Orchestra with Elmo Tanner	"Heartaches"; Ted Weems and His Orchestra with Elmo Tanner	"Heartaches"	
May 10	"Heartaches"; Ted Weems and His Orchestra with Elmo Tanner	"Linda"; Ray Noble and His Orchestra with Buddy Clark	"Heartaches"; Ted Weems and His Orchestra with Elmo Tanner	"Mam'selle"	
May 17	"Heartaches"; Ted Weems and His Orchestra with Elmo Tanner	"Heartaches"; Ted Weems and His Orchestra with Elmo Tanner	"Heartaches"; Ted Weems and His Orchestra with Elmo Tanner	"Mam'selle"	
May 24	"Heartaches"; Ted Weems and His Orchestra with Elmo Tanner	"Heartaches"; Ted Weems and His Orchestra with Elmo Tanner	"Heartaches"; Ted Weems and His Orchestra with Elmo Tanner	"Mam'selle"	
May 31	"Heartaches"; Ted Weems and His Orchestra with Elmo Tanner	"Mam'selle"; Frank Sinatra	"Heartaches"; Ted Weems and His Orchestra with Elmo Tanner	"Mam'selle"	
June 7	"Mam'selle"; Art Lund	"Heartaches"; Ted Weems and His Orchestra with Elmo Tanner	"Heartaches"; Ted Weems and His Orchestra with Elmo Tanner	"Mam'selle"	
June 14	"Mam'selle"; Art Lund	"Heartaches"; Ted Weems and His Orchestra with Elmo Tanner	"Heartaches"; Ted Weems and His Orchestra with Elmo Tanner	"Mam'selle"	
June 21	"Peg o' My Heart"; The Harmonicats	"Linda"; Ray Noble and His Orchestra with Buddy Clark	"Peg o' My Heart"; The Harmonicats	"Mam'selle"	
June 28	"Chi-Baba, Chi-Baba (My Bambino Go to Sleep)"; Perry Como and the Satisfiers with Lloyd Shaffer and His Orchestra	"Temptation (Tim-Tayshun)"; Red Ingle and the Natural Seven with Cinderella G. Stump and Red Ingle	"Peg o' My Heart"; The Harmonicats	"Peg o' My Heart"	
July 5	"Chi-Baba, Chi-Baba (My Bambino Go to Sleep)"; Perry Como and the Satisfiers with Lloyd Shaffer and His Orchestra	"Peg o' My Heart"; Buddy Clark	"Peg o' My Heart"; The Harmonicats	"Peg o' My Heart"	
July 12	"Chi-Baba, Chi-Baba (My Bambino Go to Sleep)"; Perry Como and the Satisfiers with Lloyd Shaffer and His Orchestra	"Peg o' My Heart"; Buddy Clark	"Peg o' My Heart"; The Harmonicats	"Peg o' My Heart"	
July 19	"Peg o' My Heart"; The Harmonicats	"Peg o' My Heart"; Buddy Clark	"Peg o' My Heart"; The Harmonicats	"Peg o' My Heart"	
July 26	"Peg o' My Heart"; The Harmonicats	"Peg o' My Heart"; Buddy Clark	"Peg o' My Heart"; The Harmonicats	"Peg o' My Heart"	
August 2	"Peg o' My Heart"; The Harmonicats	"Peg o' My Heart"; Buddy Clark	"Peg o' My Heart"; The Harmonicats	"Peg o' My Heart"	
August 9	"Smoke! Smoke! Smoke! (That Cigarette)"; Tex Williams and His Western Caravan with Tex Williams and Trio	"Peg o' My Heart"; Buddy Clark	"Peg o' My Heart"; The Three Suns	"Peg o' My Heart"	
August 16	"Smoke! Smoke! Smoke! (That Cigarette)"; Tex Williams and His Western Caravan with Tex Williams and Trio	"Smoke! Smoke! Smoke! (That Cigarette)"; Tex Williams and His Western Caravan with Tex Williams and Trio	"Peg o' My Heart"; The Three Suns	"Peg o' My Heart"	
August 23	"Smoke! Smoke! Smoke! (That Cigarette)"; Tex Williams and His Western Caravan with Tex Williams and Trio	"Peg o' My Heart"; The Three Suns	"Peg o' My Heart"; The Harmonicats	"Peg o' My Heart"	
August 30	"Smoke! Smoke! Smoke! (That Cigarette)"; Tex Williams and His Western Caravan with Tex Williams and Trio	"Near You"; Francis Craig and His Orchestra with Bob Lamm	"Smoke! Smoke! Smoke! (That Cigarette)"; Tex Williams and His Western Caravan with Tex Williams and Trio	"Peg o' My Heart"	
September 6	"Smoke! Smoke! Smoke! (That Cigarette)"; Tex Williams and His Western Caravan with Tex Williams and Trio	"Near You"; Francis Craig and His Orchestra with Bob Lamm	"Peg o' My Heart"; The Three Suns	"Peg o' My Heart"	
September 13	"Smoke! Smoke! Smoke! (That Cigarette)"; Tex Williams and His Western Caravan with Tex Williams and Trio	"Near You"; Francis Craig and His Orchestra with Bob Lamm	"Smoke! Smoke! Smoke! (That Cigarette)"; Tex Williams and His Western Caravan with Tex Williams and Trio	"Peg o' My Heart"	
September 20	"Near You"; Francis Craig and His Orchestra with Bob Lamm	"Near You"; Francis Craig and His Orchestra with Bob Lamm	"Smoke! Smoke! Smoke! (That Cigarette)"; Tex Williams and His Western Caravan with Tex Williams and Trio	"Peg o' My Heart"	
September 27	"Near You"; Francis Craig and His Orchestra with Bob Lamm	"Near You"; Francis Craig and His Orchestra with Bob Lamm	"Smoke! Smoke! Smoke! (That Cigarette)"; Tex Williams and His Western Caravan with Tex Williams and Trio	"Near You"	
October 4	"Near You"; Francis Craig and His Orchestra with Bob Lamm	"Near You"; Francis Craig and His Orchestra with Bob Lamm	"Near You"; Francis Craig and His Orchestra with Bob Lamm	"Near You"	
October 11	"Near You"; Francis Craig and His Orchestra with Bob Lamm	"Near You"; Francis Craig and His Orchestra with Bob Lamm	"Near You"; Francis Craig and His Orchestra with Bob Lamm	"Near You"	
October 18	"Near You"; Francis Craig and His Orchestra with Bob Lamm	"Near You"; Francis Craig and His Orchestra with Bob Lamm	"Near You"; Francis Craig and His Orchestra with Bob Lamm	"Near You"	
October 25	"Near You"; Francis Craig and His Orchestra with Bob Lamm	"Near You"; Francis Craig and His Orchestra with Bob Lamm	"Near You"; Francis Craig and His Orchestra with Bob Lamm	"Near You"	
November 1	"Near You"; Francis Craig and His Orchestra with Bob Lamm	"Near You"; Francis Craig and His Orchestra with Bob Lamm	"Near You"; Francis Craig and His Orchestra with Bob Lamm	"Near You"	
November 8	"Near You"; Francis Craig and His Orchestra with Bob Lamm	"Near You"; Francis Craig and His Orchestra with Bob Lamm	"Near You"; Francis Craig and His Orchestra with Bob Lamm	"Near You"	
November 15	"Near You"; Francis Craig and His Orchestra with Bob Lamm	"Near You"; Francis Craig and His Orchestra with Bob Lamm	"Near You"; Francis Craig and His Orchestra with Bob Lamm	"Near You"	
November 22	"Near You"; Francis Craig and His Orchestra with Bob Lamm	"Near You"; Francis Craig and His Orchestra with Bob Lamm	"Near You"; Francis Craig and His Orchestra with Bob Lamm	"Near You"	
November 29	"Near You"; Francis Craig and His Orchestra with Bob Lamm	"Near You"; Francis Craig and His Orchestra with Bob Lamm	"Near You"; Francis Craig and His Orchestra with Bob Lamm	"Near You"	
December 6	"Near You"; Francis Craig and His Orchestra with Bob Lamm	"Near You"; Francis Craig and His Orchestra with Bob Lamm	"Near You"; Francis Craig and His Orchestra with Bob Lamm	"Near You"	
December 13	"Ballerina"; Vaughn Monroe and His Orchestra with Vaughn Monroe	"Near You"; Francis Craig and His Orchestra with Bob Lamm	"Near You"; Francis Craig and His Orchestra with Bob Lamm	"Near You"	
December 20	"Ballerina"; Vaughn Monroe and His Orchestra with Vaughn Monroe	"Near You"; Francis Craig and His Orchestra with Bob Lamm	"Near You"; Francis Craig and His Orchestra with Bob Lamm	"Near You"	
December 27	"Ballerina"; Vaughn Monroe and His Orchestra with Vaughn Monroe	"Ballerina"; Vaughn Monroe and His Orchestra with Vaughn Monroe	"Near You"; Francis Craig and His Orchestra with Bob Lamm	"Near You"	

== Number-one artists ==
List of number-one artists by total weeks at number one
Artist	Weeks at #1
Ted Weems	12
Francis Craig	12
Sammy Kaye	6
Tex Williams	6
The Harmonicats	4
Vaughn Monroe	3
Perry Como	3
Art Lund	2
Freddy Martin	2
Count Basie	1
The King Cole Trio	1

== See also ==
- 1947 in music
