= Dick Jurgens =

American swing music bandleader and composer

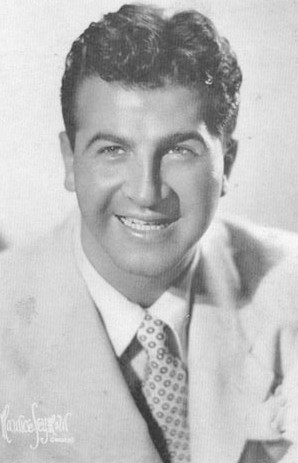
- Jurgens in the 1940s

Background information
- Born: Richard Henry Jurgens; January 9, 1910; Sacramento, California, U.S.
- Died: October 5, 1995 (aged 85) Sacramento, California, U.S.
- Genres: Jazz
- Occupation(s): Bandleader, composer
- Labels: Decca, Columbia, Okeh

Richard Henry Jurgens (January 9, 1910 – October 5, 1995) was an American swing music bandleader and composer who enjoyed great popularity in the late 1930s and early 1940s.

== Life and early career ==
Dick Jurgens was born in Sacramento, California, United States, to Dietrich Heinrich Jurgens and Clara Matilda Jurgens (née Erath). Jurgens played in an orchestra in high school but was kicked out of the ensemble for playing pop music. In response, he formed his own group in 1928 while still a student. His brother Will Jurgens was a member; Will later became Dick's manager during his years of fame. Jurgens then studied at the University of California at Berkeley and Sacramento Junior College (now Sacramento City College) before accepting an engagement with his own orchestra at the St. Francis Hotel in San Francisco in 1934. Jurgens signed a contract with Decca Records, and recorded extensively for the label between 1934 and 1940. Jurgens' vocalist at this time was Eddy Howard.

Jurgens held residencies at the Casino Ballroom on Catalina Island, the Elitch Gardens in Denver, the Aragon Ballroom and the Trianon Ballroom in Chicago, and other popular swing venues. He recorded for Vocalion Records in 1938 and for Okeh Records starting in 1940. His first side to reach Your Hit Parade was "It's a Hundred to One You're in Love with Me" in 1939; the following year, "In an Old Dutch Garden" proved to be a big hit. Jurgens often found that Glenn Miller's versions of his hits performed better on the charts than his own, such as the song "Careless". Following Howard's departure from the group in 1940, Harry Cool became its lead singer. Jurgens scored more hits later that year, with "A Million Dreams Ago" and the instrumental "Elmer's Tune", the latter of which Miller would take a vocal version to number one. Later hits included "The Bells of San Raquel" and "Happy in Love" (released on Columbia Records). His biggest hit was 1942's "One Dozen Roses", with Buddy Moreno on vocals; the song hit No. 1 in the summer of that year and was also recorded or performed by Harry James, Glen Gray, Glenn Miller, and Dinah Shore.

Later in 1942, Jurgens disbanded his group due in no small part to the 1942 recording ban by the American Federation of Musicians. He joined the Marines from 1942 to 1945, directing theater shows for the troops. In 1946 he re-formed his band, recording for Columbia and Mercury into the 1950s. He had his own radio show in 1948 on CBS, and also married in December of that year to Miriam Davidson.

1941 sheet music cover for "Elmer's Tune" featuring Dick Jurgens, Robbins Music.

== Later career ==
Jurgens kept up his group until 1956, by which time his style of swing had long passed out of popular favor. After this he moved to Colorado Springs and founded an electronics business with his brother. He occasionally played at The Broadmoor resort in Colorado Springs, and moved to California in 1965, where he again played intermittently. He put together a new band late in the 1960s; he played and recorded with the group on a part-time basis through 1976. His latter years were spent in Sacramento in the real estate business. He sold the rights to his ensemble's name to Don Ring in 1986. He died in 1995 of cancer at age 85.

== Compositions ==
Dick Jurgens helped make a song better in February 1941 when he arranged, played and named "Elmer's Tune" after its composer, Elmer Albrecht of Chicago. Dick Jurgens and his Orchestra recorded "Elmers Tune" as an instrumental on April 10, 1941. Sammy Gallop wrote the lyrics when big band leader Glenn Miller asked Jurgens if he could record a vocal version of the tune. Glenn Miller and his Orchestra recorded it on August 11, 1941.

On page 3 of the Wednesday, February 4, 1942 edition of The Rambler, a paper by Texas Wesleyan University in Fort Worth, Texas, was an article entitled, “Elmer’s Tune Written In Morgue”. It is a copy of most of the Kent State University article, “12 Dead Chinamen 'Hear’ Original “Elmer's Tune”” published in The Kent Stater, Volume XVII, Number 62 in Kent, Ohio on January 22, 1942 on page 2. It is written as if the concert mentioned has not yet occurred, but it was published a week days after the concert it mentioned as being played on January 26, 1942. The remainder of the article is an exact copy of the KSU article, starting with ““Elmer’s Tune” was received very coldly”, and ending with “the lyrics were written around the title later.” Here's how the Texas article begins. “Elmer’s Tune Written In Morgue” - The Composer of “Elmer’s Tune,” (who really is a guy named Elmer) and, what’s more, looks like a guy named Elmer plays America’s No 1 novelty hit when he appears as guest-pianist with Dick Jurgens’ orchestra, January 26.

Dick Jurgens wrote or co-wrote a number of songs, including "Elmer's Tune", "Careless", "I Won't Be Home Anymore When You Call", "One Dozen Roses", "It's a Hundred To One (I'm in Love)", "I Guess I'll Be On My Way", "If I Knew Then (What I Know Now)", and "Day Dreams Come True At Night".
