= By the Sleepy Lagoon =

1940 song by Eric Coates and Jack Lawrence

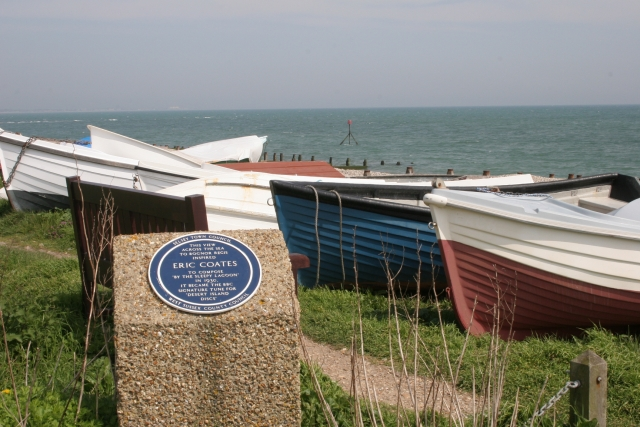
Plaque commemorating Eric Coates' composition of By the Sleepy Lagoon at Selsey, West Sussex. (detail of plaque)

By the Sleepy Lagoon is a light-orchestral valse serenade by British composer Eric Coates, written in 1930. In 1940 American songwriter Jack Lawrence added lyrics with Coates' approval; the resulting song, "Sleepy Lagoon", became a popular-music standard of the 1940s.

== Orchestral serenade: By the Sleepy Lagoon ==
British composer Eric Coates was inspired to compose By the Sleepy Lagoon in 1930 while overlooking a beach in West Sussex. His son, Austin Coates, later remembered:

It was inspired in a very curious way and not by what you might expect. It was inspired by the view on a warm, still summer evening looking across the "lagoon" from the east beach at Selsey towards Bognor Regis. It's a pebble beach leading steeply down, and the sea at that time is an incredibly deep blue of the Pacific. It was that impression, looking across at Bognor, which looked pink—almost like an enchanted city with the blue of the Downs behind it—that gave him the idea for the Sleepy Lagoon. He didn't write it there; he scribbled it down, as he used to, at extreme speed, and then simply took it back with him to London where he wrote and orchestrated it.

The piece is a slow waltz for full orchestra that lasts roughly four minutes. Michael Jameson observed that the piece is "elegantly orchestrated" with "a shapely theme for violins presented in the salon-esque genre entirely characteristic of British light music in the 1920s and '30s".

"Sleepy Lagoon"
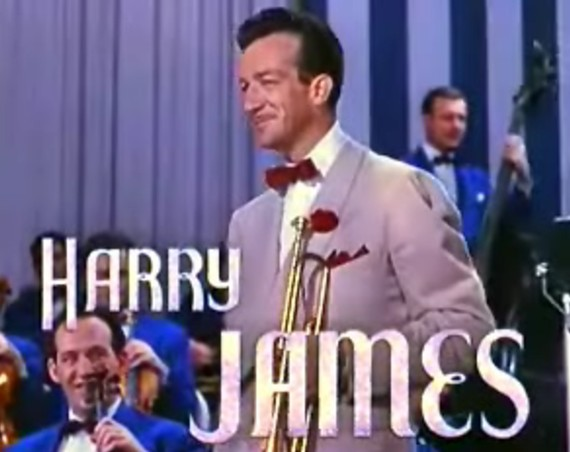

Single by Harry James and His Orchestra
- B-side: Trumpet Blues
- Written: 1930
- Published: 24 June 1940 by Chappell & Co., Ltd., London, UK
- Released: March 1942
- Recorded: 24 February 1942
- Studio: Columbia Studio E, New York City
- Genre: swing, Valse serenade
- Length: 2:58
- Label: Columbia 36549
- Composer(s): Eric Coates
- Lyricist(s): Jack Lawrence

In early 1940, American songwriter Jack Lawrence came across the piano solo version of By the Sleepy Lagoon and wrote a song lyric, then took it to Chappell, the publisher of Coates's original melody. The head of Chappell's New York office, Max Dreyfus, was concerned that this lyric had been added without consulting the composer. Dreyfus warned Lawrence that Coates "may resent your tampering with his melody". Dreyfus also did not think the melody belonged in the popular genre and that it was better suited to its original treatment as a piece of light classical music.

Later that year, Lawrence attempted to contact Coates in person. Britain was in the middle of World War II, and, contrary to Dreyfus' fears, Coates thought the lyrics fit so well that he retorted he could hardly believe it had been written to a pre-existing melody: "You have set the words to my music so cleverly that one would never suspect that the music had been written first!"

The song, "Sleepy Lagoon", was published as a Lawrence-Coates collaboration in 1940. Lawrence showed the song to bandleader Harry James, whose recording of it was released by Columbia Records as catalog number 36549. It first reached the Billboard Best Seller chart on 17 April 1942 and lasted 18 weeks on the chart, peaking at number 1.

Other hit versions were recorded by Dinah Shore, David Rose, Fred Waring, Glenn Miller and others. A recording with Tom Jenkins and his Palm Court Orchestra was made in London on 15 March 1949. It was released by EMI on the His Master's Voice label as catalogue number B 9768. Peter Kreuder recorded the tune in 1949. The song made the Billboard Hot 100 in 1960, in a version by the Platters, found originally on the flipside of the 1960 top ten "Harbor Lights".

== In popular culture ==
By the Sleepy Lagoon has been the theme music to BBC Radio 4's long-running series Desert Island Discs since its inception in 1942.

At the height of the Coates-Lawrence song's popularity in 1942, a minor reservoir near Los Angeles was christened the "Sleepy Lagoon" by local youths. After the media's extensive use of the song title when reporting on the Sleepy Lagoon Murder in that same year, the name became permanent—although the reservoir itself has since disappeared.

In 1977, "Sleepy Lagoon" made a notable appearance in the famous Oscar-winning motion picture Annie Hall directed by Woody Allen.

Coates' musical piece has been used since 1952 for one of the first fairytales in the Dutch theme park Efteling, called The Magic Clock. In 2012 it also became the main musical theme of the water fountain spectacle Aquanura at the park. The fountain show is the largest of its kind in Europe. As the show is performed nightly on a large lake, the creators used By the Sleepy Lagoon as an introduction and linking melody throughout the show. The musical piece was partly rearranged and rerecorded by the Dutch Brabant Orchestra especially for the show.

== See also ==
- List of number-one singles of 1942 (U.S.)
