= Rhythm on the River =

1940 film by Victor Schertzinger

- Theatrical release poster
- Directed by: Victor Schertzinger
- Written by: Billy Wilder (story); Jacques Théry (story); Dwight Taylor
- Produced by: William LeBaron
- Starring: Bing Crosby; Mary Martin; Basil Rathbone
- Cinematography: Ted Tetzlaff
- Edited by: Hugh Bennett
- Music by: Victor Young
- Production company: Paramount Pictures
- Distributed by: Paramount Pictures
- Release date: September 6, 1940
- Running time: 92 minutes
- Country: United States
- Language: English

Rhythm on the River is a 1940 American musical comedy film directed by Victor Schertzinger and starring Bing Crosby and Mary Martin as ghostwriters whose songs are credited to a composer played by Basil Rathbone. Crosby and Martin sang "Only Forever", for which James V. Monaco (music) and Johnny Burke (lyrics) were nominated for the Academy Award for Best Original Song.

== Plot ==
Oliver Courtney is an arrogant composer who lets other people write songs he takes credit for. Bob Sommers writes his tunes with Billy Starbuck. At the night of a social Christmas party, Oliver introduces Bob's song "What Would Shakespeare Have Said?" as his own. Later that night, Oliver thanks Bob for his loyalty and offers him a contract for $50 a week for three years. He refuses, saying he would rather have a catboat to visit his uncle at his river hotel, called Nobody's Inn.

After his lyric writer dies, Oliver finds a replacement in Cherry Lane. She is reluctant about being a ghost writer, but accepts his offer. He is satisfied with her first lyric. She becomes ambitious to write better lines, but is not able to concentrate at home, and it is suggested she move to a small and quiet place. Meanwhile, Bob and Cherry meet several times, without knowing they are working for the same employer. She does not think highly of him.

To work in a perfect environment, Cherry travels to Tarrytown and stays at Nobody's Inn. Bob decides to give the inn a visit at the same time, and they are shocked to run into each other yet again. They soon become acquainted and actually start liking each other. They even compose their own song together. However, because they are not allowed to tell who they are working for, they do not find out they are colleagues. She becomes mad at him when he plays the song; she wrote the lines for and states he wrote it himself.

Bob is confused and travels back to town to resign. Cherry has come to office as well to inform her boss she thinks someone has stolen his lines. They realize they were working together all along. Bob and Cherry make up and decide to start their own music composing careers. After a few unsuccessful auditions, Bob agrees to start a band. They audition for Mr. Westlake, but he is only interested in Cherry. He offers her a job as a nightclub singer, but she is loyal to the band and rejects his offer.

Bob notices it is a great opportunity for Cherry and gives her his consent to work for Westlake. He takes his job back as Oliver's ghost writer and raises $200 so Cherry can premiere with the song they wrote together at Nobody's Inn. However, she is unhappy at her new job and is helped by Bob to get out of her contract. Oliver feels sympathetic toward them and persuades them not to walk away by announcing the song is not written by him. After announcing they will soon marry, Bob and Cherry perform their song.

== Cast ==
- Bing Crosby as Bob Sommers
- Mary Martin as Cherry Lane
- Basil Rathbone as Oliver Courtney
- Oscar Levant as Billy Starbuck
- Oscar Shaw as Charlie Goodrich
- Charley Grapewin as Uncle Caleb
- Lillian Cornell as Millie Starling
- William Frawley as Mr. Westlake
- John Scott Trotter as himself (orchestra leader)
- Ken Carpenter as Teddy Gardner (announcer)
- Phyllis Kennedy as Patsy Flick
- Brandon Hurst as Bates
- Jeanne Cagney as Country cousin
- Billy Benedict as Elevator boy
- Charles Lane as Bernard Schwartz
- Pierre Watkin as "Uncle" (pawnshop owner)
- Helen Bertram as Aunt Delia

Various musicians and entertainers also make appearances, including Wingy Manone, Jack Pepper, and Harry Barris

== Reception ==
In his review of The New York Times, Bosley Crowther says that the movie is "one of the most like-able musical pictures of the season", mentioning the "ease of comedy of Bing Crosby, the charm of Mary Martin, and the spirited performance of Oscar Levant in addition to songs like 'Ain't It a Shame about Mame"

This was echoed by Variety. "Some may tab this as the best picture Crosby has appeared in for several years. It's certainly one of his toppers . . . Bing Crosby continues his policy of splitting co-starring credits and performance importance with others in the cast. . .Crosby tackles his acting assignment with the nonchalance that has proven effective in past releases and on the air. He also provides much of the musical portion of the film in singing tunes in solo and with Miss Martin...Total of seven songs are presented by Crosby and Miss Martin, any one of which has potentialities for swinging into the hit class. Although ‘Only Forever' gets strong plugging in the picture, there's a good chance that the title tune, ‘Rhythm on the River,' sung by Crosby will catch strongest pop favor..."

== Soundtrack ==
- "Only Forever" sung by Bing Crosby and Mary Martin.
- "When the Moon Comes Over Madison Square" (James V. Monaco / Johnny Burke) sung by Bing Crosby.
- "Rhythm on the River" (James V. Monaco / Johnny Burke) sung by Bing Crosby.
- "That's for Me" (James V. Monaco / Johnny Burke) sung by Bing Crosby and Mary Martin.
- "What Would Shakespeare Have Said?" (James V. Monaco / Johnny Burke) sung by Bing Crosby and by Lillian Cornell.
- "Ain't It a Shame About Mame?" (James V. Monaco / Johnny Burke) sung by Mary Martin.
- "I Don't Want to Cry Any More" (Victor Schertzinger) sung by Mary Martin.
- "Tiger Rag" featured by Wingy Manone and his Band.

Bing Crosby recorded a number of the songs for Decca Records. "Only Forever" topped the Billboard charts for nine weeks and "That's for Me" charted also with a peak position of #9 in a 7-week stay. Crosby's songs were also included in the Bing's Hollywood series.

== Connection to The Carpenters ==
The film mentions a (fictional) song named "Goodbye to Love"; Richard Carpenter watched the film and thought that would be a good title for a Carpenters song, which was eventually recorded and released in 1972.
