= Sammy Kaye discography =

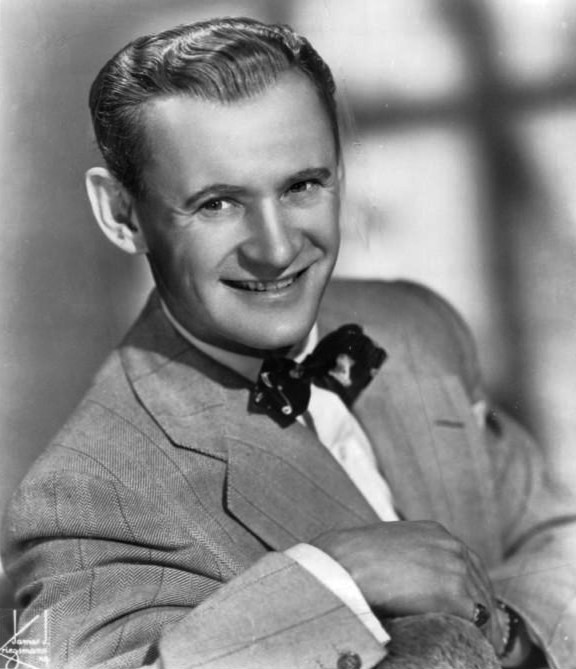
Kaye pictured in 1952

This is the discography for American jazz band leader Sammy Kaye.

== Albums ==
- All Ashore—vocals: Tommy Ryan (9-19-1938)
- Along the Santa Fe Trail—vocals: Jimmy Brown (11-12-1940)
- Chickery Chick—vocals: Nancy Norman and Billy Williams (11-8-1945)
- Christmas Day with Sammy Kaye—Decca DL 74070 (1960)
- Come Dance to the Hits—Decca DL 74502 (1964)
- Daddy—vocals: Choir (3-31-1941)
- Dance to My Golden Favorites—Decca DL 74121
- Dreamy Dancing—Columbia CL-1254 (1959) Mono
- Harbor Lights—Columbia (1950)
- Here You Are—vocals: Elaine Beatty (4-7-1942, Chicago)
- I Left My Heart at the Stagedoor Canteen—vocals: Don Cornell (6-5-1942)
- I Married an Angel—vocals: Jimmy Brown (5-19-1938)
- I Want to Wish You a Merry Christmas—Columbia CL 1035 (1957)
- In Our Little Part of Town—vocals: Clyde Burke (12-5-1939, NY)
- Josephine (8-25-1937, NY)
- Let There Be Love—vocals: Tommy Ryan (3-20-1940, NY)
- Minka—vocals: Tommy Ryan (6-18-1944)
- Music Maestro Please—Columbia CL-668 (1956)
- My Buddy—vocals: Tommy Ryan (12-30-1941)
- Penny Serenade—vocals: Jimmy Brown (1-20-1939, NY)
- Remember Pearl Harbor—vocals: Glee Club (12-17-1941)
- Rosalie—vocals: Tommy Ryan (7-7-1937, NY)
- Sammy Kaye Plays Swing & Sway for Your Dancing Pleasure—Decca DL 74306 (19??)
- Serenade of the Bells—Columbia CL 1173 (1958)
- "Sing and Sway with Sammy Kaye and his Orchestra" (Decca Records, date unknown)
- Songs I Wish I Had Played...The First Time Around—Decca DL 74154 (19??)
- Star Dust (5-27-1938, NY)
- The Shrine of St. Cecelia—vocals: Don Cornell (10-23-1941)
- The White Cliffs of Dover—vocals: Arthur Wright (11-11-1941)
- True Confession—vocals: Charlie Wilson (10-27-1937)
- Two Hearts That Pass in the Night—vocals: Arthur Wright (3-31-1941)
- Until Tomorrow (Goodnight, My Love)—vocals: The Three Kaydettes (12-23-1940, NY)
- What Makes Sammy Swing & Sway—Columbia CL 891 (1956)
- White Sails (Beneath a Yellow Moon)—vocals: Clyde Burk (5-17-1939, NY)
- Wonder When My Baby's Coming Home—vocals: Nancy Norman (6-5-1942, NY)

== Songs ==
Year	Single	Chart positions		
Year	Single	US	US AC	AUS
1937	"Swing and Sway"	15		
1937	"Josephine"	15		
1937	"Rosalie"	1		
1938	"Sometimes I'm Happy"	18		
1938	"True Confession"	11		
1938	"Love Walked In"	1		
1938	"When They Played the Polka"	4		
1938	"I Married an Angel"	17		
1938	"All Ashore"	3		
1938	"Two Sleepy People"	6		
1938	"Carolina Moon"	15		
1938	"They Say"	11		
1938	"Hurry Home"	4		
1939	"Star Dust"	16		
1939	"My Blue Heaven"	17		
1939	"Penny Serenade"	2		
1939	"There's a Hole in the Old Oaken Bucket"	10		
1939	"We've Come a Long Way Together"	8		
1939	"White Sails (Beneath a Yellow Moon)"	4		
1939	"My Heart Has Wings"	14		
1939	"Shabby Old Cabby"	7		
1939	"In Our Little Part of Town"	16		
1940	"Last Night's Gardenias"	17		
1940	"Let There Be Love"	4		
1940	"Make Believe Island"	19		
1940	"Where Was I?"	11		
1940	"Dream Valley"	1		
1940	"A Nightingale Sang in Berkeley Square"	21		
1940	"Along the Santa Fe Trail"	9		
1941	"The Mem'ry of a Rose"	24		
1941	"Until Tomorrow (Goodnight My Love)"	10		
1941	"Daddy"	1		
1941	"The Reluctant Dragon"	12		
1941	"Harbor of Dreams"	22		
1941	"Minka"	14		
1942	"The Shrine of St. Cecelia"	7		
1942	"(There'll Be Bluebirds Over) The White Cliffs of Dover"	11		
1942	"Madelaine"	9		
1942	"Remember Pearl Harbor"	3		
1942	"Dear Mom"	21		
1942	"On the Street of Regret"	21		
1942	"Here You Are"	25		
1942	"Johnny Doughboy Found a Rose in Ireland"	13		
1942	"Wonder When My Baby's Coming Home"	19		
1942	"I Left My Heart at the Stage Door Canteen"	3		
1942	"Where the Mountains Meet the Sky"	20		
1942	"I Came Here to Talk for Joe"	8		
1942	"My Buddy"	23		
1943	"There Will Never Be Another You"	20		
1943	"Taking a Chance on Love"	13		
1944	"There Goes That Song Again"	8		
1945	"You Always Hurt the One You Love"	10		
1945	"Always"	10		
1945	"Don't Fence Me In"	4		
1945	"Saturday Night (Is the Loneliest Night of the Week)"	6		
1945	"Just a Prayer Away"	10		
1945	"All of My Life"	10		
1945	"Gotta Be This or That"	6		
1945	"Good, Good, Good (That's You, That's You)"	10		
1945	"Chickery Chick"	1		
1945	"Walkin' with My Honey (Soon, Soon, Soon)"	10		
1945	"Promises"	17		
1945	"I Can't Begin to Tell You"	9		
1945	"It Might as Well Be Spring"	4		
1946	"Atlanta, GA."	6		
1946	"I'm a Big Girl Now"	1		
1946	"The Gypsy"	3		
1946	"Laughing on the Outside, Crying on the Inside"	3		
1946	"The Old Lamp-Lighter"	1		
1946	"Sooner or Later (You're Gonna Be Comin' Around)"	8		
1946	"Zip-a-Dee-Doo-Dah"	11		
1947	"The Egg and I"	16		
1947	"After Graduation Day"	22		
1947	"That's My Desire"	2		
1947	"The Red Silk Stockings and Green Perfume"	8		
1947	"The Echo Says 'No'"	17		
1947	"An Apple Blossom Wedding"	5		
1947	"The Little Old Mill (Went Round and Round)"	24		
1947	"Serenade of the Bells"	3		
1947	"Hand in Hand"	21		
1947	"Dream Again"	21		
1947	"I'll Hate Myself in the Morning"	20		
1948	"I Love You, Yes I Do"	10		
1948	"Tell Me a Story"	8		
1948	"Baby Face"	11		
1948	"Down Among the Sheltering Palms"	14		
1948	"Lavender Blue (Dilly Dilly)"	4		
1949	"Careless Hands"	3		
1949	"Powder Your Face with Sunshine"	13		
1949	"Kiss Me Sweet"	29		
1949	"Room Full of Roses"	2		
1949	"The Four Winds and the Seven Seas"	3		
1949	"Baby, It's Cold Outside"	12		
1949	"Dime a Dozen"	24		
1949	"Hollywood Square Dance"			1
1950	"It Isn't Fair"	2		
1950	"Wanderin'"	11		
1950	"Roses"	5		
1950	"Harbor Lights"	1		
1951	"Longing for You"	16		
1951	"(It's No) Sin"	25		
1952	"You"	28		
1952	"Walkin' to Missouri"	11		
1953	"In the Mission of St. Augustine"	15		
1961	"Welcome Home"	68		
1964	"Charade"	36	10	
