= Only Forever (song) =

Single by Bing Crosby with John Scott Trotter and His Orchestra

from the album Rhythm on the River
- B-side: "When the Moon Comes Over Madison Square"
- Released: August 1940
- Recorded: July 3, 1940
- Genre: Traditional pop
- Length: 3:12
- Label: Decca
- Songwriters: James V. Monaco, Johnny Burke

"Only Forever" is a song popularized in 1940 by Bing Crosby. It reached number one on the Billboard charts on October 19, 1940 and spent nine weeks in that position during a 20-week stay in the charts. "Only Forever" was written by James V. Monaco and Johnny Burke, initially intended for the 1940 Crosby film If I Had My Way, but it was eventually used in Crosby's next film project, Rhythm on the River and the song was nominated for the Academy Award for Best Original Song.

== Recordings ==
Bing Crosby recorded it for Decca Records on July 3, 1940 with John Scott Trotter and His Orchestra. Crosby sang:

Do you think I'll remember how you look when you smile? Only forever, that's putting it mild.

Tommy Dorsey and Eddy Duchin also enjoyed chart success with the song. The song has also been recorded by Anne Shelton, Dean Martin, Kay Starr, Nat King Cole, Vera Lynn and Al Bowlly and Jimmy Mesene.

== See also ==
- List of number-one singles of 1940 (U.S.)
