= List of Billboard number-one singles of 1941 =

This is a list of number-one songs in the United States during the year 1941 according to The Billboard.

The National Best Selling Retail Records chart was the first to poll retailers nationwide on record sales.

The new chart was advertised as a trade service feature, based on the "10 best selling records of the past week" at a selection of national retailers from New York to Los Angeles.

Shown is a list of songs that topped the National Best Selling Retail Records chart in 1941.

Issue date	Song	Artist(s)	Ref.
January 4	"Frenesi"	Artie Shaw and His Orchestra	
January 11	"Frenesi"	Artie Shaw and His Orchestra	
January 18	"Frenesi"	Artie Shaw and His Orchestra	
January 25	"Frenesi"	Artie Shaw and His Orchestra	
February 1	"Frenesi"	Artie Shaw and His Orchestra	
February 8	"Frenesi"	Artie Shaw and His Orchestra	
February 15	"Frenesi"	Artie Shaw and His Orchestra	
February 22	"Frenesi"	Artie Shaw and His Orchestra	
March 1	"Frenesi"	Artie Shaw and His Orchestra	
March 8	"Frenesi"	Artie Shaw and His Orchestra	
March 15	"Song of the Volga Boatmen"	Glenn Miller and His Orchestra	
March 22	"Frenesi"	Artie Shaw and His Orchestra	
March 29	"Amapola (Pretty Little Poppy)"	Jimmy Dorsey and His Orchestra with Bob Eberly and Helen O'Connell	
April 5	"Amapola (Pretty Little Poppy)"	Jimmy Dorsey and His Orchestra with Bob Eberly and Helen O'Connell	
April 12	"Amapola (Pretty Little Poppy)"	Jimmy Dorsey and His Orchestra with Bob Eberly and Helen O'Connell	
April 19	"Amapola (Pretty Little Poppy)"	Jimmy Dorsey and His Orchestra with Bob Eberly and Helen O'Connell	
April 26	"Amapola (Pretty Little Poppy)"	Jimmy Dorsey and His Orchestra with Bob Eberly and Helen O'Connell	
May 3	"Amapola (Pretty Little Poppy)"	Jimmy Dorsey and His Orchestra with Bob Eberly and Helen O'Connell	
May 10	"Amapola (Pretty Little Poppy)"	Jimmy Dorsey and His Orchestra with Bob Eberly and Helen O'Connell	
May 17	"Amapola (Pretty Little Poppy)"	Jimmy Dorsey and His Orchestra with Bob Eberly and Helen O'Connell	
May 24	"Amapola (Pretty Little Poppy)"	Jimmy Dorsey and His Orchestra with Bob Eberly and Helen O'Connell	
May 31	"Amapola (Pretty Little Poppy)"	Jimmy Dorsey and His Orchestra with Bob Eberly and Helen O'Connell	
June 7	"My Sister and I"	Jimmy Dorsey and His Orchestra with Bob Eberly	
June 14	"Maria Elena"	Jimmy Dorsey and His Orchestra with Bob Eberly	
June 21	"Daddy"	Sammy Kaye with the Kaye Choir	
June 28	"My Sister and I"	Jimmy Dorsey and His Orchestra with Bob Eberly	
July 5	"Maria Elena"	Jimmy Dorsey and His Orchestra with Bob Eberly	
July 12	"Daddy"	Sammy Kaye with the Kaye Choir	
July 19	"Daddy"	Sammy Kaye with the Kaye Choir	
July 26	"Daddy"	Sammy Kaye with the Kaye Choir	
August 2	"Daddy"	Sammy Kaye with the Kaye Choir	
August 9	"Daddy"	Sammy Kaye with the Kaye Choir	
August 16	"Daddy"	Sammy Kaye with the Kaye Choir	
August 23	"Daddy"	Sammy Kaye with the Kaye Choir	
August 30	"Green Eyes (Aquellos Ojos Verdes)"	Jimmy Dorsey and His Orchestra with Bob Eberly and Helen O'Connell	
September 6	"Green Eyes (Aquellos Ojos Verdes)"	Jimmy Dorsey and His Orchestra with Bob Eberly and Helen O'Connell	
September 13	"Green Eyes (Aquellos Ojos Verdes)"	Jimmy Dorsey and His Orchestra with Bob Eberly and Helen O'Connell	
September 20	"Green Eyes (Aquellos Ojos Verdes)"	Jimmy Dorsey and His Orchestra with Bob Eberly and Helen O'Connell	
September 27	"Blue Champagne"	Jimmy Dorsey and His Orchestra with Bob Eberly	
October 4	"Piano Concerto in B Flat"	Freddy Martin and His Orchestra	
October 11	"Piano Concerto in B Flat"	Freddy Martin and His Orchestra	
October 18	"Piano Concerto in B Flat"	Freddy Martin and His Orchestra	
October 25	"Piano Concerto in B Flat"	Freddy Martin and His Orchestra	
November 1	"Piano Concerto in B Flat"	Freddy Martin and His Orchestra	
November 8	"Piano Concerto in B Flat"	Freddy Martin and His Orchestra	
November 15	"Piano Concerto in B Flat"	Freddy Martin and His Orchestra	
November 22	"Piano Concerto in B Flat"	Freddy Martin and His Orchestra	
November 29	"Chattanooga Choo Choo"	Glenn Miller and His Orchestra with Tex Beneke and the Four Modernaires	
December 6	"Chattanooga Choo Choo"	Glenn Miller and His Orchestra with Tex Beneke and the Four Modernaires	
December 13	"Chattanooga Choo Choo"	Glenn Miller and His Orchestra with Tex Beneke and the Four Modernaires	
December 20	"Elmer's Tune"	Glenn Miller and His Orchestra with Ray Eberle and the Modernaires	
December 27	"Chattanooga Choo Choo"	Glenn Miller and His Orchestra with Tex Beneke and the Four Modernaires	

== Number-one artists ==
List of number-one artists by total weeks at number one
Artist	Weeks at #1
Jimmy Dorsey	19
Artie Shaw	11
Freddy Martin	8
Sammy Kaye	8
Glenn Miller	6

== See also ==
- 1941 in music
