= It's Been a Long, Long Time =

1945 song written by Jule Styne and Sammy Cahn

Song by Harry James and his orchestra, vocal by Kitty Kallen
- Released: 1945
- Genre: Big Band
- Length: 3:24
- Composer: Jule Styne
- Lyricist: Sammy Cahn

"It's Been a Long, Long Time" is a big band–era song that was a hit at the end of World War II, with music by Jule Styne and lyrics by Sammy Cahn.

== Background ==
1945 recording by Bing Crosby with Les Paul and His Trio on Decca

The lyrics are written from the perspective of a person welcoming home their spouse at the end of the war.

== Popular recordings ==
The most popular recording, by the trumpeter Harry James and His Orchestra with Kitty Kallen on vocals, debuted in October 1945 on Billboard's Best-Selling Popular Retail Records chart and reached number one in the chart dated November 24, 1945 – the last of Harry James's nine US number ones. The record features a standout solo by alto saxophonist Willie Smith.

A hit version by iconic crooner Bing Crosby with Les Paul and His Trio (recorded on July 12, 1945, at Decca's Los Angeles studios) debuted the same week as James's record, which it replaced at number one in the chart dated December 8, 1945. Sammy Kaye's "Chickery Chick" then returned to number one, only to be replaced by the Harry James recording, which reclaimed the top spot (for one final week) in the chart dated December 22. James's and Crosby's hits remained on the chart for 17 and 16 weeks, respectively. Both versions reached number one on Billboard's Records Most-Played on the Air chart and its Most-Played Juke Box Records chart.

Two other recordings of "It's Been a Long, Long Time" charted in North America in late 1945: Charlie Spivak and His Orchestra with vocal by Irene Daye (US no. 4) and Stan Kenton and His Orchestra with vocal by June Christy (US no. 6). "It's Been a Long, Long Time" topped Billboard's composite Honor Roll of Hits chart for the last seven weeks of 1945.

Les Paul recalled in an interview for Mojo magazine, "Bing was a sucker for guitar and that particular song was a case of you don't have to play a lot of notes, you just have to play the right notes."

The song has since become a standard, with versions recorded by The DeMarco Sisters (1945), June Haver and Dan Dailey (1950), Perry Como (1956), Al Hibbler (1956), Peggy Lee (1959), Keely Smith (1959), and Louis Armstrong (1964). In 1945 Frank Sinatra sang a version on the radio show Your Hit Parade, and this recording has appeared on many compilation albums. Harry James and His Orchestra also re-recorded the song with singer Helen Forrest during subsequent radio transcriptions.

== In popular culture ==
Harry James's 1945 recording of the song is used extensively throughout the Marvel Cinematic Universe, notably in Captain America: The Winter Soldier, and as the song that Steve Rogers and Peggy Carter dance to after Steve returns to the past in Avengers: Endgame.

== Sources ==
- Grudens, Richard (2002). Bing Crosby: Crooner of the Century. Celebrity Profiles Publishing Co. ISBN 1-57579-248-6.
- Macfarlane, Malcolm. Bing Crosby: Day By Day. Scarecrow Press, 2001.
- Osterholm, J. Roger. Bing Crosby: A Bio-Bibliography. Greenwood Press, 1994.
