= Paper Doll (Mills Brothers song) =

1942 song by The Mills Brothers

Single by The Mills Brothers
- A-side: "I'll Be Around"
- Published: 1922 Edward B. Marks Music Corp.
- Released: May 1942
- Recorded: February 18, 1942
- Genre: Jazz
- Label: Decca 18318
- Songwriter: Johnny S. Black

"Paper Doll" was a hit song for The Mills Brothers. In the United States it held the number-one position on the Billboard singles chart for twelve weeks, from November 6, 1943, to January 22, 1944. The success of the song represented something of a revival for the group after a few years of declining sales. It is one of the fewer than 40 all-time singles to have sold 10 million (or more) physical copies worldwide.

== Author and inspiration ==
The song was written in 1915 (although it was not published until 1930) by Johnny S. Black, whose greatest success would come with his song "Dardanella", which sold 5,000,000 copies in a recording by the bandleader Ben Selvin in 1920 and a further 2,000,000 copies of sheet music. In 1922, Black played "Paper Doll" to the music publisher Edward B. Marks on the violin, after which Marks bought it for $25 in advance royalties. Marks put "Paper Doll" on the market, but it was a flop. In 1936, Johnny Black died after a fight with a customer at his Hamilton, Ohio, roadhouse.

Black was apparently inspired to write the song after he was jilted by a girlfriend. The author Jack London Riehl wrote that Black was "a pianist, who augmented his income by boxing. His girlfriend ran off with another boxer, and he wrote this song, which began, 'I'd like to buy a paper doll that I can call my own ...' and ended 'I'd rather have a paper doll to call my own than have a fickle-minded real live girl.'"

== Recording and slow chart climb ==
On February 18, 1942, The Mills Brothers recorded "I'll Be Around" by Alec Wilder as their new single, with "Paper Doll" as the B-side. It is rumored that it took less than fifteen minutes to record the latter. Harry Mills recalled that he and his brother Herbert did not initially like the song, although their brother Donald did. However, Harry said, "as we went along rehearsing it, we got to feeling it".

It was released by Decca Records in May but generated little interest. A review in Billboard on May 16 called the song "more pleasing" than the A-side of the record but ended, "Little here save for Mills fans at particular locations." It did make number 9 in the South Region on October 24, 1942, for one week, then reappeared on May 22, 1943. It finally hit number 10 on August 7 and number 1 on November 6, which is where it stayed through January 22, 1944, charting forty weeks in all.

=== Chart performance ===
Charts (1943–44)	Rank
US Billboard National Best Selling Retail Records	1
US Billboard Harlem Hit Parade	2
US Billboard National Best Selling Retail Records Year-End	1
US Billboard R&B Records Year-End	14

== Other recordings ==
The song has been named one of the Songs of the Century and has been inducted into the Grammy Hall of Fame. Many artists have recorded it, including

- Bing Crosby for the album Songs I Wish I Had Sung the First Time Around (1956)
- Perez Prado for the album Pops and Prado (1959)
- Frank Sinatra for the album Come Swing with Me! (1961)
- Pat Boone for the album I'll See You in My Dreams (1962)
- Kurt Elling for the album Wildflowers, Vol. 1 (2024)

In 1975, British actors Don Estelle and Windsor Davies (both known for the sitcom It Ain't Half Hot Mum) recorded a novelty version of the song. It reached number 41 in the UK singles chart in 1975. As with their cover of "Whispering Grass", they sang in character.

== Film appearances ==
- 1944, Two Girls and a Sailor – This presented the unusual situation of Lena Horne's singing "Paper Doll", in which the lyrics express a man's regret that his girlfriend has left him. Gail Lumet Buckley wrote in her book about the Hornes, "Lena ... sang 'Paper Doll' and 'hated it' ('It's a boy's song,' she complained)."
- 1944, Hi, Good Lookin'! – starring Harriet Nelson.
- 1971, Red Sky at Morning
- 1973, The Way We Were – played on piano and sung by all at a party.
- 1974, The Execution of Private Slovik – The Mills Brothers version is used.
- 1987, Radio Days – The Mills Brothers version is used.
- 2001, The Majestic – The Mills Brothers version is used.

== Popular culture ==
- In addition to its film appearances, the Mills Brothers version of the song appears in the British television miniseries The Singing Detective.
- Four lines of it are sung by Rodolfo in the first act of Arthur Miller's play A View from the Bridge.
- It is mentioned (as the song being played by a Negro band in a bar near the Kowalskis' home) in stage directions of the third scene of Tennessee Williams's play A Streetcar Named Desire.
- Several lines of this song are sung by a Frank Sinatra impersonator on Law and Order SVU, season 19, episode 22.

== See also ==
- List of Billboard number-one singles of the 1940s
