= List of Billboard number-one singles of 1940 =

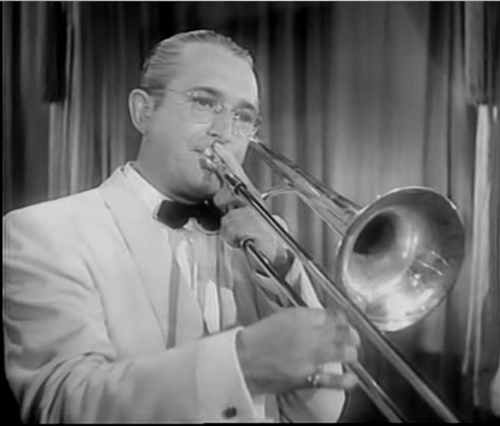
Bandleader Tommy Dorsey achieved the first Billboard number-one single with "I'll Never Smile Again", which topped the National Best Selling Retail Records chart for twelve consecutive weeks.

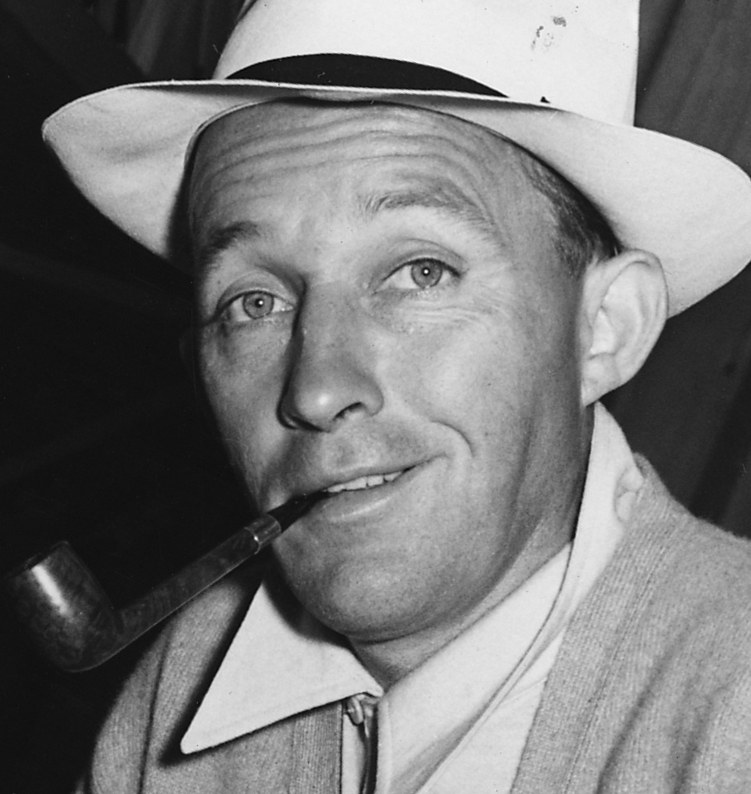
Singer Bing Crosby topped the chart for nine consecutive weeks with "Only Forever".

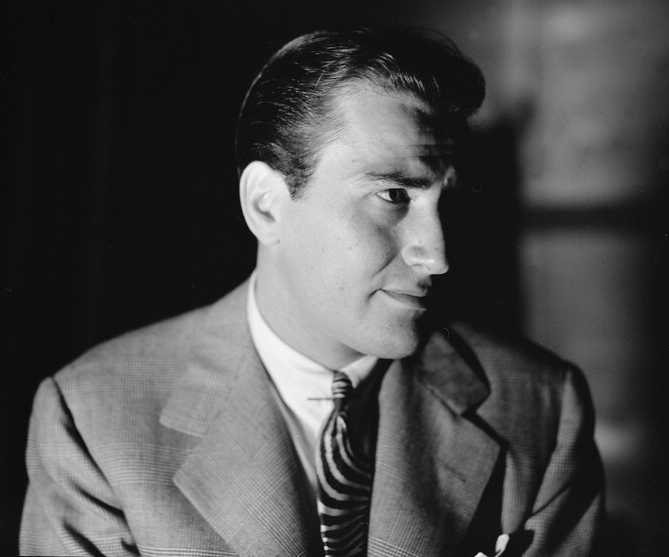
"Frenesi", an instrumental recorded by clarinetist Artie Shaw, occupied the number one position on the chart during the final two weeks of 1940.

In 1940, The Billboard began compiling and publishing the National Best Selling Retail Records chart. Debuting in the issue dated July 27, it marked the beginning of the magazine's nationwide tracking of record sales in the United States. Initially titled the "National List of Best Selling Retail Records", the weekly ten-position chart was tabulated using sales figures received from a selection of merchants across the country. Prior to its introduction, The Billboard had produced lists ranking music by various metrics such as performance in vaudeville venues, jukebox plays, sheet music sales, and regional airplay.

The first National Best Selling Retail Records number-one single was "I'll Never Smile Again" by Tommy Dorsey and His Orchestra. Featuring vocals by Frank Sinatra and the vocal group the Pied Pipers, the song topped the chart for twelve consecutive weeks and elevated Sinatra to national popularity.

== Chart history ==
Issue date	Song	Artist(s)	Ref.
July 27	"I'll Never Smile Again"	Tommy Dorsey and His Orchestra with Frank Sinatra and the Pied Pipers	
August 3	"I'll Never Smile Again"	Tommy Dorsey and His Orchestra with Frank Sinatra and the Pied Pipers	
August 10	"I'll Never Smile Again"	Tommy Dorsey and His Orchestra with Frank Sinatra and the Pied Pipers	
August 17	"I'll Never Smile Again"	Tommy Dorsey and His Orchestra with Frank Sinatra and the Pied Pipers	
August 24	"I'll Never Smile Again"	Tommy Dorsey and His Orchestra with Frank Sinatra and the Pied Pipers	
August 31	"I'll Never Smile Again"	Tommy Dorsey and His Orchestra with Frank Sinatra and the Pied Pipers	
September 7	"I'll Never Smile Again"	Tommy Dorsey and His Orchestra with Frank Sinatra and the Pied Pipers	
September 14	"I'll Never Smile Again"	Tommy Dorsey and His Orchestra with Frank Sinatra and the Pied Pipers	
September 21	"I'll Never Smile Again"	Tommy Dorsey and His Orchestra with Frank Sinatra and the Pied Pipers	
September 28	"I'll Never Smile Again"	Tommy Dorsey and His Orchestra with Frank Sinatra and the Pied Pipers	
October 5	"I'll Never Smile Again"	Tommy Dorsey and His Orchestra with Frank Sinatra and the Pied Pipers	
October 12	"I'll Never Smile Again"	Tommy Dorsey and His Orchestra with Frank Sinatra and the Pied Pipers	
October 19	"Only Forever"	Bing Crosby with John Scott Trotter and His Orchestra	
October 26	"Only Forever"	Bing Crosby with John Scott Trotter and His Orchestra	
November 2	"Only Forever"	Bing Crosby with John Scott Trotter and His Orchestra	
November 9	"Only Forever"	Bing Crosby with John Scott Trotter and His Orchestra	
November 16	"Only Forever"	Bing Crosby with John Scott Trotter and His Orchestra	
November 23	"Only Forever"	Bing Crosby with John Scott Trotter and His Orchestra	
November 30	"Only Forever"	Bing Crosby with John Scott Trotter and His Orchestra	
December 7	"Only Forever"	Bing Crosby with John Scott Trotter and His Orchestra	
December 14	"Only Forever"	Bing Crosby with John Scott Trotter and His Orchestra	
December 21	"Frenesi"	Artie Shaw and His Orchestra	
December 28	"Frenesi"	Artie Shaw and His Orchestra	

== Number-one artists ==
List of number-one artists by total weeks at number one
Artist	Weeks at #1
Tommy Dorsey	12
Bing Crosby	9
Artie Shaw	2

== See also ==
- 1940 in music
