= I Can't Begin to Tell You =

1945 song

Song by Introduced by John Payne
- Published: 1945
- Composer: James V. Monaco
- Lyricist: Mack Gordon

"I Can't Begin to Tell You" is a popular song with music written by James V. Monaco and lyrics by Mack Gordon. The song was published in 1945.

The song was introduced by John Payne and reprised by Betty Grable in the film The Dolly Sisters. "I Can't Begin to Tell You" was nominated for the Academy Award for Best Original Song in 1946, but lost out to "On the Atchison, Topeka and the Santa Fe".

A version by Bing Crosby was the best-known recording, reaching its peak of popularity in 1945.

== Hit versions ==
- The recording by Bing Crosby (with Carmen Cavallaro on piano) was recorded on August 7, 1945 and released by Decca Records as catalog number 23457. It first reached the Billboard Best Seller chart on November 15, 1945, and lasted for 17 weeks on the chart, peaking at No. 1.
- The recording by Andy Russell was released by Capitol Records as catalog number 221. It first reached the Billboard Best Seller chart on December 27, 1945, and lasted for two weeks on the chart, peaking at No. 8.
- A version by Sammy Kaye and His Orchestra (vocal by Nancy Norman) also reached the Billboard charts, peaking at No. 9 in 1946.
- The recording by the Harry James orchestra, with his wife Grable (as "Ruth Haag", using Grable's real first name and James' middle name) singing, was released by Columbia Records as catalog number 36867. It first reached the Billboard Best Seller chart on December 27, 1945, and lasted 3 weeks on the chart, peaking at No. 9. The flip side, "Waitin' for the Train to Come In," also charted, reaching No. 10 in its only week on the chart.

== Other notable recordings ==
The song has also been recorded by Perry Como (1946), Steve Conway (1946) Brook Benton (1959), Jane Morgan (1959), Michael Holliday (1960) and Joni James (1960). Willie Nelson recorded a country genre version of the song for his album Without a Song (1983).
