= Elmer's Tune =

Single by Glenn Miller and his Orchestra with Ray Eberle and The Modernaires
- B-side: "Delilah"
- Released: August 29, 1941
- Recorded: August 11, 1941
- Genre: Swing; big band; vocal jazz
- Length: 3:06
- Label: Bluebird B-11274-A
- Songwriters: Elmer Albrecht, Dick Jurgens and Sammy Gallop

Glenn Miller and his Orchestra with Ray Eberle and The Modernaires singles chronology
| "The Cowboy Serenade (While I'm Rollin' My Last Cigarette)" (1941) | "Elmer's Tune" (1941) | "From One Love to Another" (1941) |

"Elmer's Tune" is a 1941 big band and jazz standard written by Elmer Albrecht, Dick Jurgens and Sammy Gallop. Glenn Miller and his Orchestra and Dick Jurgens and his Orchestra both charted with recordings of the composition.

The Glenn Miller recording on RCA Bluebird Records featuring the lyrics by Sammy Gallop reached no. 1 on Billboard in 1941.

== Background ==
Elmer Albrecht originally composed the tune in the early 1920s. At the time, he was a student at the Worsham College of Embalming in Chicago and worked at Louis Cohen's funeral parlor on Clark Street. According to Albrecht, he originally worked out the tune on a piano in a back room of the funeral parlor which at the time held the corpses of twelve men killed in Chicago's Tong Wars.

Over the years, Albrecht, who continued to work as an embalmer, played the tune in honky-tonks and small night clubs around Chicago. He offered it to Ted Weems, who turned it down. Then, in February 1941, he approached Dick Jurgens, whose band had a residency at Chicago's Aragon Ballroom. Albrecht worked nearby and had an arrangement to use one of the pianos at the venue during his lunch break. Albrecht made a nuisance of himself, and Jurgens, who was inundated with requests from song promoters, finally agreed to arrange Albrecht's tune for his orchestra.

A short time later, Jurgens and his band were preparing to perform the tune (still nameless) on the radio. After a frantic effort by the radio announcer and two lyricists to come up with a title, Jurgens casually suggested “Elmer's Tune" and the name stuck. Jurgens recorded it as an instrumental for Okeh Records (6209) on April 10, 1941. This version reached No. 8 on the Billboard Best Selling Retail Records chart in October 1941.

== Glenn Miller recording ==
The popularity of the tune prompted Glenn Miller to ask Jurgens if he could record a vocal version of the song. Robbins Music Company, the song’s publisher, hired Sammy Gallop to write the lyrics. Miller recorded his version of the song for RCA Bluebird (B-11274-A) on August 11, 1941, in New York with Ray Eberle on lead vocals and the Modernaires on backing vocals. This version was an even bigger success than Jurgens’ recording, peaking at No. 1 for one week on the Billboard Best Selling Retail Records chart for the week ending December 13, 1941, in a 20-week chart run.

The personnel on the recording were Ray Eberle, the Modernaires (vocals), Billy May, John Best, Alec Fila, R.D. McMickle (trumpet), Glenn Miller, Jim Priddy, Paul Tanner, Frank D'Annolfo (trombone), Hal McIntyre, Wilbur Schwartz (clarinet, alto saxophone), Tex Beneke, Al Klink (tenor saxophone), Ernie Caceres (baritone saxophone), Chummy MacGregor (piano), Bobby Hackett (guitar), Edward "Doc" Goldberg (string bass), and Maurice Purtill (drums).

== Other recordings ==
Other recordings of the song that were popular at the time were performed by the Andrews Sisters (Decca 4008, recorded August 4, 1941) and Benny Goodman with Peggy Lee on vocals (Columbia 36359, recorded August 15, 1941).

The song was also recorded by Bob Crosby and His Orchestra (Decca 3959, recorded June 30, 1941), The Charioteers (Okeh 6390, recorded August 25, 1941), Lawrence Welk and His Orchestra (Decca 4096, recorded November 14, 1941), Kollege of Musical Knowledge (performed on radio and recorded December 11, 1941), Blue Barron and His Orchestra (Elite 5001, 1941), Carroll Gibbons and the Savoy Hotel Orpheans (Columbia (UK) FB 2764, 1941–42), Ambrose and His Orchestra (Decca (UK) F8065, recorded 5 January 1942), Geraldo and His Orchestra (Parlophone (UK) F1888, recorded 19 January 1942), Dartmouth Barbary Coast Orchestra (Dartmouth, December 7, 1942), Jimmy Blade's Music (Rondo 104, 1946), Bob Wills & His Texas Playboys (Tiffany, recorded August 18, 1947), Del Wood (Republic, 1953), Geordie Hormel (Coral 61052, 1953), Jackie Lee, His Piano & Orchestra (Coral 94 283 (DE), 1957), Mark Murphy (Decca, 1957), Kathy Linden (Felsted, 1959), Billy Vaughn (Dot, 1959), Grady Martin and the Slew Foot Five (Decca 9-31013, 1959), Flip Black and the Boys Upstairs (Ace 581, 1960), Shay Torrent (Heartbeat 32, 1963), Horst Jankowski (Mercury, 1966), Al Hirt (RCA Victor, 1967) and Herb Remington (Stoneway, 1973).

== Use in commercials ==
A 1983 Canon photocopier commercial used Elmer's Tune to show various users of the advertised copier who "all sing Canon's tune".
