= Nancy Norman =

American singer (1925–2024)

Nancy Norman was an American singer.

== Life and career ==
Norman was born in Los Angeles, California on April 23, 1925.

Norman studied voice while attending Roosevelt High School. She sang with a swing orchestra led by Edmundo Martinez Tostado.

In 1948, Norman was married to singer Dick Brown. She married Robert Jacobs in 1949 and relocated to Beverly Hills, California. She remained in her native Los Angeles at the same home she and her husband built shortly after their marriage. Norman had three children. She died in Beverly Hills on May 27, 2024, at the age of 99.
