= There Are Such Things =

Song by Tommy Dorsey and His Orchestra with Frank Sinatra and The Pied Pipers
- Published: 1942
- Songwriters: Stanley Adams; Abel Baer; George W. Meyer

"There Are Such Things" is a popular song composed by Stanley Adams, Abel Baer, and George W. Meyer, published in 1942. The first and most popular version was performed by Tommy Dorsey's orchestra with vocals by Frank Sinatra and The Pied Pipers, which reached No. 1 on the US best-selling records chart in 1942. This version hit No. 2 on the Harlem Hit Parade chart. There have been many other versions recorded since.

== Recorded versions ==
- Frank Sinatra – with Tommy Dorsey & His Orchestra (1942) and on I Remember Tommy (1961)
- Count Basie – for the album Count Basie/Sarah Vaughan (1961)
- Billy Eckstine – recorded for National Records in 1948 (catalog No. 9096).
- Al Hibbler – for his album Starring Al Hibbler (1956).
- Ahmad Jamal – included in his album Cry Young (1967)
- Etta Jones – for her album Love Shout (1962)
- Al Martino – for his album This Is Al Martino (1968).
- Sonny Rollins – Work Time (1956)
- Anne Shelton
- Norman Simmons – included in the album The Art of Norman Simmons (2000).
