= Sunday, Monday, or Always =

1943 song by Jimmy Van Heusen and Johnny Burke

"Sunday, Monday or Always" is a 1943 popular song with music by Jimmy Van Heusen and lyrics by Johnny Burke.

The biggest hit version, recorded by Bing Crosby with the Ken Darby Singers on July 2, 1943, and appearing in his film Dixie, was made during a musician's strike, and recorded with a vocal group background instead of an orchestra. This recording was released by Decca Records as catalog number 18561. It first reached the Billboard magazine Best Seller chart on August 19, 1943, and lasted 18 weeks on the chart, peaking at #1.

The song was also recorded by Frank Sinatra about the same time, with a similar vocal background because of the strike. This version was released by Columbia Records as catalog number 36679. It first reached the Billboard magazine Best Seller chart on September 9, 1943, and lasted 4 weeks on the chart, peaking at #9. The Sinatra version is heard briefly in the 1945 film It's in the Bag!. A subsequent parody version by Sinatra, titled "Dick Haymes, Dick Todd and Como", was recorded October 23, 1944, for the V-Disc program.

The song is featured in a 1944 Amos 'n' Andy radio show, in which Andy Brown composes a similar song entitled "Tuesday, Wednesday or Thursday" and accuses Van Heusen, Burke and Kay Kyser of stealing the song from him.

== Other notable recordings ==
- 1944 Mildred Bailey for a V-Disc.
- 1961 Nat King Cole - recorded for the album The Touch of Your Lips.
- 1962 Michael Holliday - for his album To Bing - From Mike.
- 1964 Pat Boone included in his album Ain't That a Shame.
