= I've Heard That Song Before =

1942 song by Jule Styne and Sammy Cahn

Single by Harry James Orchestra
- B-side: "Moonlight Becomes You"
- Published: September 14, 1942; Edwin H. Morris & Co., Inc.
- Released: December 4, 1942
- Recorded: July 31, 1942
- Studio: Los Angeles, CA
- Genre: Swing
- Length: 2:58
- Label: Columbia 36668
- Composer: Jule Styne
- Lyricist: Sammy Cahn

Harry James Orchestra singles chronology
"I Had the Craziest Dream" (1942)	"I've Heard That Song Before" (1942)	"All or Nothing at All" (1943)

"I've Heard That Song Before" is a 1942 American popular song about nostalgia with music by Jule Styne and lyrics by Sammy Cahn. It was introduced by Martha O'Driscoll (dubbed by Margaret Whiting) in the 1942 film Youth on Parade. The song was nominated for the Academy Award for Best Original Song in 1942, but lost out to "White Christmas".

The most notable version of the song was recorded by Harry James and his Orchestra with Helen Forrest on vocals on July 31, 1942. This was the last day of recording before the beginning of the 1942–1944 musicians' strike. The recording was issued on Columbia 36668 and became a number one hit on both the pop charts and the Harlem Hit Parade in the US in early 1943. This version of the song can be heard in Woody Allen's 1986 movie Hannah and Her Sisters.

== Recorded versions ==
- Paul Anka
- Louie Bellson
- Sathima Bea Benjamin
- Pat Boone
- Sammy Cahn
- King Cole Trio
- Bing Crosby
- Sammy Davis Jr.
- Michael Feinstein
- Benny Green
- Urbie Green
- Al Hirt
- Hal Linden
- Vera Lynn
- Andrea Marcovicci
- Al Martino
- Audrey Morris
- Frank Sinatra

== Sources ==
- Jacobs, Dick & Jacobs, Harriet: Who Wrote That Song? Writer's Digest Books, 2nd Edition 1992
