= On the Atchison, Topeka and the Santa Fe =

1944 song by Harry Warren and Johnny Mercer

"On the Atchison, Topeka and the Santa Fe" is a pop song written by Harry Warren with lyrics by Johnny Mercer. The song was published in 1944, spanned the hit chart in mid-1945, and won the 1946 Academy Award for Best Original Song, the first win for Mercer.

The song refers to the Atchison, Topeka and Santa Fe Railway and was featured in the 1946 Western film The Harvey Girls, about the 19th century nation-wide chain of Harvey House restaurants, established by entrepreneur Fred Harvey. It was sung by Judy Garland, with support from cast members Ben Carter, Marjorie Main, Virginia O'Brien, Ray Bolger, and the MGM Studios Chorus.

At one point in mid-1945, versions by Mercer, Bing Crosby, and the Tommy Dorsey Orchestra were on the hit chart simultaneously. In late September, the Crosby version, first to make the chart, was joined by one by Judy Garland and the Merry Macs close-harmony back-up group (1920s to 2000).

Mercer said that the lyrics came to him when he was sitting on a Union Pacific Railroad train and saw another train labeled "Atchison, Topeka and Santa Fe'", and he was struck by the rhythm of the words. Despite mentions in the poetic lyrics of the song written by Johnny Mercer, the A.T.& S.F. never directly reached north to Laramie, Wyoming (actually served by the transcontinental line of the Union Pacific Railroad) or to Philadelphia, Pennsylvania (served in reality by the Reading Company, Pennsylvania Railroad or Baltimore & Ohio Railroad lines in the East).

== Recorded versions ==
- The Johnny Mercer recording was released by Capitol Records as catalog number 195. The recording, with backing vocals by The Pied Pipers, first reached the Billboard charts on July 5, 1945, and lasted 16 weeks on the chart, peaking at number one.
- The Bing Crosby recording (backing vocals by Six Hits and a Miss) was made on February 17, 1944 and released by Decca Records as catalog number 18690. The record first reached the Billboard charts on July 19, 1945, and lasted ten weeks on the chart, peaking at number four.
- The Tommy Dorsey and His Orchestra recording, vocal by The Sentimentalists, was released by RCA Victor Records as catalog number 20-1682. The record first reached the Billboard charts on August 2, 1945, and lasted six weeks on the chart, peaking at number six.
- The Judy Garland/Merry Macs recording was released by Decca Records as catalog number 23436. The record reached the Billboard charts on September 20, 1945, at number ten, its only week on the chart.
- It has been covered by other artists, including Petula Clark, Louis Jordan, Harry Connick Jr., Mandy Patinkin, The Four Freshmen, Henry Mancini, John Denver, Bill Henderson, and Rosemary Clooney with Harry James and His Orchestra.
- The song was prominently featured in the opening ceremony of the 1987 Pan American Games in Indianapolis, Indiana

== See also ==
- List of number-one singles of 1945 (U.S.)
- List of train songs
