= The Old Lamp-Lighter =

1946 song

Single by Swing and Sway With Sammy Kaye
- B-side: "Touch-Me-Not"
- Released: 1946
- Label: RCA Victor
- Songwriters: Nat Simon & Charles Tobias

"The Old Lamplighter"

Single by The Browns

from the album Town & Country
- A-side: "Teen-Ex"
- Released: 1960
- Genre: Countrypolitan
- Length: 2:20
- Label: RCA Victor
- Songwriters: Nat Simon & Charles Tobias
- Producer: Chet Atkins

The Browns singles chronology
"Scarlet Ribbons (For Her Hair)" (1959)	"The Old Lamplighter" (1960)	"Lonely Little Robin" (1960)

"The Old Lamp-Lighter" is a popular song. The music was written by Nat Simon, the lyrics by Charles Tobias. The song was published in 1946.

== Background ==
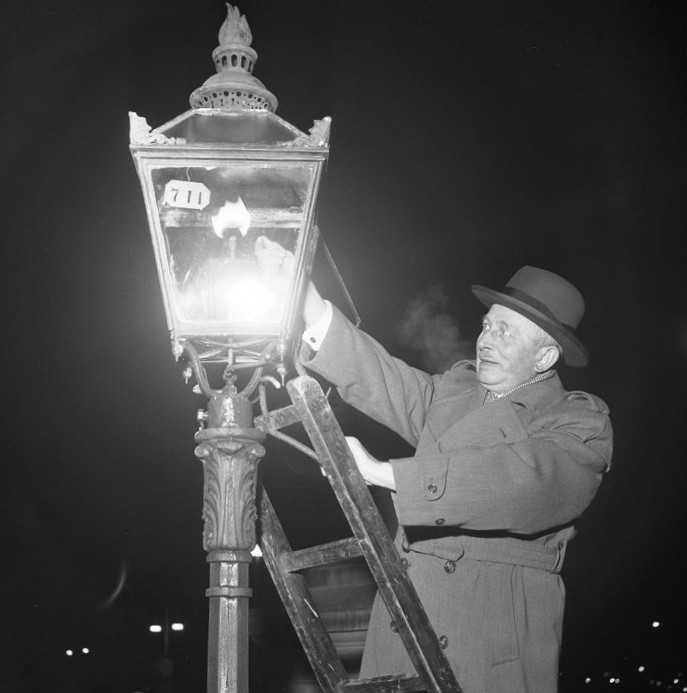
A lamplighter in 1953, by which time this was already an increasingly rare sight, reminiscent of earlier eras

The lyrics sentimentalize and memorialize the profession of lamplighters, who walked city streets at dusk turning on the gas-powered streetlamps and turned them off again at dawn.

== 1946 versions ==
Several versions of the song made the best-seller charts in 1946-1947. The most popular recording, by Sammy Kaye (vocal by Billy Williams), was released by RCA Victor Records as catalog number 20-1963. It first reached the Billboard Best Seller chart on November 8, 1946, and lasted 14 weeks on the chart, peaking at number one.

A recording by Kay Kyser (vocal by Mike Douglas and Campus Kids) was released by Columbia Records as catalog number 37095. It first reached the Billboard Best Seller chart on November 22, 1946, and lasted 11 weeks on the chart, peaking at number three. A recording by Hal Derwin was released by Capitol Records as catalog number 288. It first reached the Billboard Best Seller chart on December 6, 1946, and lasted two weeks on the chart, peaking at number six. This was Derwin's only charted hit.

== The Browns version ==
In 1960, the song was a major country-pop hit for The Browns, released as a single early that year. It went on to become a major top-ten hit, spending 15 weeks on the US Billboard Hot 100 chart, peaking at No. 5, while reaching No. 20 on Billboard's Hot C&W Sides, and No. 17 on Billboard's Hot R&B Sides.

== Other versions ==
- Slim Whitman included the song on his album Just Call Me Lonesome (1961).
- The song was performed under the name "Luktar-Gvendur" by the Icelandic singer Björk on the album Gling-Gló, in 1990. On that album, Björk teams up with the jazz trio of Guðmundur Ingólfsson: consisting of Guðmundur Ingólfsson on piano, Guðmundur Steingrímsson on drums and Þórður Högnason on bass. The album has become one of the classics of Icelandic contemporary pop music albums.

== Use in film ==
- The song was sung by Gene Autry in the film Twilight on the Rio Grande, which first appeared in theaters on April 1, 1947.

== See also ==
- List of number-one singles of 1947 (U.S.)
- The Old Dope Peddler
