= Ballerina (Sidney Keith Russell and Carl Sigman song) =

Song
- Published: 1947
- Composer: Carl Sigman
- Lyricist: Sidney Keith 'Bob' Russell

"Ballerina" is a popular song, sometimes known as "Dance, Ballerina, Dance". The song was written by Carl Sigman with lyrics by Sidney Keith 'Bob' Russell. Published in 1947, the tune is listed as ASCAP Title Code 320012517.

== Notable recordings ==
Hit versions were recorded by:

- Vaughn Monroe (#1 in 1947)
- Buddy Clark (#5 in 1948)
- Bing Crosby (recorded December 3, 1947 - #10 in 1948)
- Jimmy Dorsey (also #10 in 1948)
- Nat King Cole (#18 in 1957)

== Sources ==
- Second Hand Songs
