= Jerry Murad's Harmonicats =

American musical group

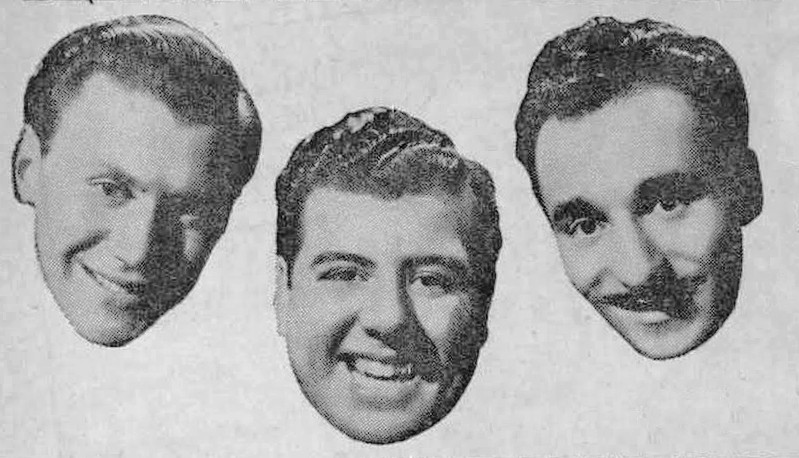
The Harmonicats, c. 1950

Jerry Murad's Harmonicats were an American harmonica-based group.

== Background ==
The earliest iteration of The Harmonicats was known as the Harmonica Madcaps, later renamed The Quintones by Jimmy Mulcay, who promoted and produced the group until 1942. They frequently performed at the Bijou Vaudeville Lounge, featuring Pete Pedersen and Jerry Murad on chromatic harmonica, Al Fiore on chord harmonica, and Bob Hadamik on bass harmonica.

In 1941, Jerry Murad and Al Fiore left the renowned Borrah Minevitch Rascals to form their own ensemble. Soon after, they recruited Don Les, officially becoming The Harmonicats in 1946 with a lineup of Murad (chromatic harmonica, lead), Hadamik (bass), Pedersen (chromatic), and Fiore (chord).

By 1947, the lineup changed to Murad, Fiore, Don Les on bass, and Cappy Lafell on Polyphonia. Around 1948, The Harmonicats transitioned into a trio with Murad, Fiore, and Les, solidifying their classic formation.

In 1947, during the record ban, the group recorded the hit song "Peg o' My Heart" for Vitacoustic Records, which spent 21 weeks on the Billboard magazine chart (peaking at No. 1) and sold more than two million copies the first year. It was the first record in history to use artificial reverb.

Pedersen and Gail Wallace remained contributors to the group throughout its existence, working on arrangements and occasionally recording.

In 1949, following the passing of Don Les' father, The Harmonicats invited Johnny Thompson to temporarily fill in on bass harmonica for a few weeks. Thompson continued performing with the group during their residency at the Frontier Hotel in Las Vegas in the early 1950s.

In the mid-1950s, Les suffered a detached retina, prompting Thompson to step in once again until Les was able to resume performing full-time later in the decade. However, during this period, a near-fatal accident involving Jerry Murad and Johnny Thompson—in which their vehicle was struck by a train and subsequently caught fire—resulted in Thompson never returning to the group.

In 1958, Al Fiore suffered his first heart attack, leading Bob Herndon to temporarily replace him for several months. Bob's time with The Harmonicats can be seen on Two for the Record, hosted by Patsy Cline.

In the early 1970s, Don Les left the group and was replaced by Richard "Dick" Gardner, who stayed with the group for more than 20 years. As of 2024, Dick Gardner is the last "long term" member of the Harmonicats alive. Other members of the group included the following:

== Members ==
=== Jerry Murad ===
Jerry Murad (born 'Muradian') (1918–1996) (chromatic harmonica) was an Armenian born in Istanbul, Turkey in 1918, and moved to America at the age of 2. He played diatonic harmonicas at first, and took up chromatic soon after. Murad played Hohner 270s and 64s, as well as the Musette, a harmonica made especially for him that replicates the sound qualities of a French accordion. It is featured on their 1960s recording of "Parisienne Fantasy". He died of a heart attack in 1996.

=== Don Les ===
Don Les (Dominic Leshinski) (1914–1994) (bass harmonica, diatonic harmonica) was born in Lorain, Ohio, with congenital cataracts. He was able to see again at the age of twelve after a series of operations, though his vision remained significantly impaired throughout his life.

Les later formed his own ensemble, The Don Les Harmonicats. The group recorded and released a Christmas album titled Christmas With The Don Les Harmonicats, featuring performances by Les alongside Mildred Mulcay and Lenny Leavitt.

=== Al Fiore ===
Al Fiore (born 'Fiorentino') (1922–1996) (chord harmonica) was born in Chicago and started experimenting with chord harmonicas at the age of 13. Fiore played the rare old-style layout or "reverse layout" Hohner Chord harmonica. He recorded the band's No. 1 hit, "Peg O' My Heart", on this harmonica. Al was a longtime member of the Windy City Harmonica Club and was widely known among harmonica players as "Mr. Harmonica".

Fiore also led a harmonica ensemble known as The Windy City Harmonica Gentlemen, a 15-member group featuring players from the Chicago area and surrounding states. The ensemble remained active into the early 1990s, with Fiore frequently performing selections associated with his earlier work with the Harmonicats.

=== Sid Fisher ===
Sid Fisher was briefly a member of the Harmonicats and appeared on several of the group's early recordings through the late 1940s and early 1950s. He was the only member of the group who did not play harmonica, instead performing on guitar. His earliest recorded work with the group can be heard on the 1947 recording of "Peg O' My Heart".

In 1948, Fisher filed a lawsuit against Jerry Murad over unpaid royalties, alleging that he had been promised a percentage of recording revenues for his work accompanying the group. He is believed to have left the group in the early 1950s.

=== Bob Hadamik ===
Bob Hadamik played the bass harmonica prior to 1946. Hank would also be the bass player for Pete Blasburg's Harmonitones of Chicago in the 1940s and 1950s. Bob's playing, alongside his brother Hank, can be heard here: https://www.youtube.com/watch?v=tBXUWc2oQ0k

=== Cappy LaFell ===
Leon "Cappy" LaFell (1913–2002) was the Polyphonia player for the Harmonicats during 1947 and 1948. His work appears on several of the group's 1948 recordings on Universal Records, and he was frequently featured in the group's publicity photographs during the late 1940s.

=== Bob Herndon ===
In the late 1950s, Bob Herndon substituted for Al Fiore on chord harmonica while Al recovered from a heart attack. He can be seen with the Harmonicats playing "Peg O' My Heart" and "12th Street Rag", in 1958.

Bob also played in other groups outside of the Harmonicats worth noting:

- The New Don Les Harmonicats (chord harmonica). - The New Tennessee Philharmonicas (chord harmonica). - The Harmonica Jaxx. - The Harmonica Jazz Trio (chord harmonica, with Al Fontana (chromatic) and John Thompson (bass harmonica)). - The Jim Lohmann Harmonikings (Harmonetta).

=== Hugh "Stagg" McMann ===
Hugh "Stagg" (also known as "Pud") McMann was a harmonica player who performed with Jerry Murad's Harmonicats in the late 1960s. A 1967 newspaper review reported that McMann had been added to the group alongside Jerry Murad, Al Fiore, and Don Les, although the article misprinted his name as "Stanley McMann".

McMann also appears on the recording At Bonaventure Hotel, Montreal, Canada / In Rehearsal released in 1968, performing second chromatic and harmonetta parts.

=== John “Johnny” Thompson ===
Johnny Thompson John “Johnny” Thompson was a bass harmonica player with Jerry Murad’s Harmonicats during the 1950s.

In January 1957, Thompson and bandleader Jerry Murad were seriously injured when their automobile collided with a Chicago Transit Authority elevated train at a grade crossing in Cicero, Illinois. The car overturned and burst into flames after striking the train. Both musicians were hospitalized but reported in good condition.

Thompson later left the group and formed his own ensemble, the Harmonica Jazz Quartet.

=== Greg Lewis ===
Greg Lewis (sometimes misprinted as “Lewis Gregory” or “Louis Greg” in contemporary newspapers) was a harmonica player who temporarily performed with Jerry Murad’s Harmonicats in the early 1950s.

A 1952 Cleveland Press feature on the group reported that Lewis substituted for regular member Don Les during a period of illness and appeared with Jerry Murad and Al Fiore in television performances.

=== Dick Gardner ===
Dick Gardner (bass harmonica) took over for Don Les in 1970 and remained with the Cats for over 20 years. Gardner was the last member of the group that was with the group over a decade.

=== Bob Bauer ===
Bob Bauer (chord harmonica) took over for George Miklas in 1985 and after Al Fiore left the group. Bob started out as a chord player for his own group, the Harmonikings (sometimes written as the Harmoni-kings) and later Paul Baron's Harmonica Rascals.

=== George Miklas ===
George Miklas was originally a chord player for the group before leaving the group and returning later to play bass with the group.

=== Al Data ===
Al Data played chord with the group in its final days, until Murad's death in 1996.

=== Danny Wilson ===
Danny Wilson was a bass harmonica player who briefly performed with Jerry Murad’s Harmonicats in the late 1970s. A 1978 newspaper feature identified Wilson as having recently replaced Dick Gardner in the trio alongside Murad and Al Fiore.

=== Buddy Boblink ===
Charles “Bud” (Buddy) Boblink was a chord harmonica player who performed with Jerry Murad’s Harmonicats during the group’s final touring years. A 1996 newspaper concert photograph identified the lineup as Boblink, Jerry Murad, and bass harmonica player George Miklas. He died in 2023.

=== Pete Pedersen ===
Pete Pedersen (1925–2002) was a chromatic harmonica player and arranger associated with Jerry Murad’s Harmonicats. He was a member of the group during its early recording period and participated in the 1947 hit recording “Peg O’ My Heart" as their arranger.

Later accounts describe Pedersen as contributing to the group’s recording and production work and appearing with the act on various occasions over the years.

=== Later performances and concert recordings with The Mass Brothers ===
Jerry Murad’s Harmonicats continued public performances into the mid-1990s. Newspaper entertainment listings advertised scheduled Christmas performances by the group at the Bavarian Inn in Frankenmuth, Michigan in December 1995. Personnel included Joe and JR Mass, two brothers from San Jose California.

A later concert production, One Night in San Francisco: The Harmonicats Live in Concert, was commercially released on video and audio formats and documents a performing lineup of the group during its later years.

Performers appearing in the recorded concert include harmonica players Joe Mass and JR Mass.

=== Murad's Final Album with Chris Bauer ===
The group’s last recorded and released album, Magic, included additional performers beyond the regular touring trio. The album credits list a second chromatic harmonica part performed by son of chord player at the time of release, Chris Bauer.

== "Peg o' My Heart" ==
Their 1947 recording of the song "Peg o' My Heart" (Mercury Records, originally on Bill Putnam's Universal Records and then reissued on Vitacoustic Records, catalog number 1) brought them public attention and sold over one million copies by 1950, reaching No. 1 on the U.S. Billboard chart. When recording engineer Bill Putnam recorded the song, he utilized the bathroom of Universal Recording as an echo chamber and became the first person to use artificial reverberation creatively on a pop recording.

== Discography ==
=== 10" albums ===
- Jerry Murad's Harmonicats (Mercury, 1950)
- Harmonica Highlights (Mercury, 1952)
- Harmonica Hits (Mercury, 1952)
- Harmonica Classics (Mercury, 1952)
- Olé: South of the Border with the Harmonicats (Mercury, 1954)

=== 12" albums ===
- Harmonicats' Selected Favorites (Mercury, 1955)
- South American Nights (Mercury, 1956)
- Command Performance (Mercury, 1956)
- The Cats Meow (Mercury, 1956)
- Dolls, Dolls, Dolls (Mercury, 1957)
- Harmonicha Cha-Cha (Mercury, 1958)
- In the Land of Hi-Fi (Mercury, 1959)
- Harmonically Yours (Mercury, 1960)
- Cherry Pink and Apple Blossom White (Columbia, 1960)
- Peg o' My Heart (Columbia, 1961)
- Love Theme from El Cid and Other Motion Picture Songs and Themes (Columbia, 1962)
- Sentimental Serenade (Columbia, 1962)
- Fiesta! (Columbia, 1962)
- Forgotten Dreams (Columbia, 1963)
- The Soul of Italy (Columbia, 1963)
- Try a Little Tenderness (Columbia, 1963)
- The Love Song of Tom Jones (Columbia, 1964)
- That New Gang of Mine! (Columbia, 1965)
- Harmonica Rhapsody (Columbia, 1965)
- What's New Harmonicats? (Columbia, 1966)
- Great Themes from TV and Motion Pictures (Columbia, 1969)

=== Cassettes ===
- Harmonicats Go Classic (re-release of Harmonica Rhapsody)
- Fascination' Harmonicats (1986)
- Harmonica Magic (with Chris and Bob Bauer, and Dick Gardner)
- Night in San Francisco (with Joe and JR Mass, 1994)
