= If I Didn't Care (album) =

Compilation album by Ink Spots
- Released: 1979
- Studio: Nashville
- Genre: Traditional pop
- Length: 28:58
- Label: CBS (Columbia) Records, 51 West

If I Didn't Care is a 1979 compilation album by the Ink Spots originally issued by Columbia Records. All tracks are stereo re-recordings of their original Decca Records hits.

Although the Ink Spots formally broke up in 1954, former lead singer Bill Kenny serves an uncredited role as the lead tenor on the album, according to his widow Audrey Kenny. Bill Kenny died in 1978 and the album was posthumously released the following year.

Two of the 1979 album's re-recorded tracks, "I Don't Want to Set the World on Fire" and "It's a Sin to Tell a Lie", were prominently featured in a 1982 Chanel No. 5 commercial and in the 2010 video game Fallout: New Vegas, respectively.

== Recording ==
At the time of release in 1979, many original members of the Ink Spots had died. Prior to the group's breakup in 1954, bass Orville "Hoppy" Jones died in on-stage in 1944. After the breakup, Deek Watson died in 1969 and shortly thereafter, Charlie Fuqua in 1971. Bill Kenny sang an uncredited role on the album before dying in 1978.

Jerry Daniels and Huey Long were alive at the time of the album's release, but it is not known if they performed on it.

== Packaging and artwork ==
The 1979 cover art features a glass ink bottle with a fountain pen dripping dark blue ink next to a red stemmed rose. The title, artist, and track listings are hand-written in lowercase cursive.

The 1982 Era Records reissue features a nude, reclining woman wearing high heels on a reflective floor and silhouetted by night stars.

The 1983 French reissue features a man and a woman dancing as well as elements from the Chanel No. 5 commercial including screenshots of the silhouetted man and the Transamerica Pyramid-esque building.

== Use by the Chanel corporation and director Ridley Scott ==
Shortly after concluding the science fiction film Alien in 1979, director Ridley Scott created a series of critically acclaimed commercials for Chanel No. 5 perfume. The first was the 1979 "Blue Sky" commercial, officially called "La Piscine" with the tagline "Share the Fantasy", and scored by future Blade Runner composer, Vangelis. The 1982 followup "L'Invitation au Rêve – Le Jardin" featured the same tagline and a similar situation of a man and a woman meeting under mysterious circumstances. An oversized piano starts playing the intro to Bill Kenny singing "I Don't Want to Set the World on Fire".

Later the same year, Ridley Scott would release the science fiction film Blade Runner. While the film shares similar noir motifs with the commercial, early trailers and the original workprint of Blade Runner also featured another Ink Spots song on its soundtrack, "If I Didn't Care". Due to copyright issues, revisions replaced the song with the sound-alike "One More Kiss, Dear".

The use of the song in the Chanel No. 5 commercial was a popular question posed to editors of various newspapers throughout the 1980s and 1990s including The Boston Globe. However, while several of the Globe's responses incorrectly cite the 1941 Decca Records version as the one used in the commercial, a 23 January 1985 portion of the "Ask the Globe" column correctly mentions various bits of minutiae including the models' names Carol Gramm and Craig Littler, the singer as Bill Kenny, and the albums where the recording can be found: "You can hear that song on the CBS record label 51 West Q 16042 entitled 'The Ink Spots: If I Didn't Care' or Era label BU4400 entitled 'Ink Spots' Greatest Hits.'"

== Ligation by the Kenny estate ==
Throughout the 1980s, newspaper columnist Denny Boyd of the Vancouver Sun wrote a number of articles regarding the widow of Bill Kenny, Audrey Kenny née McBurney. In a December 1982 article, he noted that "Audrey Kenny sat up abruptly when she heard the new Chanel No. 5 commercial" with "the voice of her late husband". While "flattered that he is linked with such an elite product. As the executrix of his estate, she is appalled that his voice is being used without her permission. She has retained a lawyer to take legal action." In the article, Audrey Kenny revealed further details about the recording of the album mentioning that while the original recording of "I Don't Want to Set the World on Fire" was made in 1941, "the track on the Chanel commercial is a new one Kenny recorded in Nashville a few months before he died."

Audrey Kenny had previously brought suit earlier in the year in April against Bill Kenny biographer Raymond Brouillette, retaining "a lawyer to obtain an injunction against Brouillette. She wants him to cease work on the Kenny story and turn the manuscript and all the tapes over to her."

In 1983, Boyd announced that "The Chanel perfume corporation, legally challenged for using the recorded voice of the late Bill (Ink Spots) Kenny without authorization in a television commercial, is going to work out a settlement with widow Audrey Kenny of Burnaby. They want the voice rights in perpetuity."

As a coda in 1985, Boyd wrote that the Chanel No. 5 commercial with Bill Kenny's voice had "won a Clio award for advertising excellence."

== 1983 French reissue ==

Due to the popularity of the commercial, Carrere Records reissued the album in France in 1983 noting on the cover "Musique originale du spot TV" (translation: original music from the television commercial). The album was retitled to The World on Fire (I Don't Want to Set...) by The Ink Spots.

The track order was rearranged to give "I Don't Want to Set the World on Fire" top billing with an additional 45 rpm lead single. "I Don't Want to Set the World on Fire" was overdubbed to add additional piano which was prominently featured on the giant piano in the commercial, but not present on the original album.

The cover art features a man and a woman dancing and recreates elements from the Chanel No. 5 commercial including screenshots of the silhouetted man and the Transamerica Pyramid-esque building.

== Track listing ==
Original 1979 issue
No.	Title	Writer(s)	Length
1.	"Whispering Grass (Don't Tell The Trees)"	Fred Fisher, Doris Fisher	2:42
2.	"Maybe"	Allan Flynn, Frank Madden	3:14
3.	"The Gypsy"	Billy Reid	2:38
4.	"To Each His Own"	Jay Livingston, Ray Evans	3:06
5.	"I Don't Want to Set the World on Fire"	Bennie Benjamin, Eddie Durham, Sol Marcus, Eddie Seiler.	2:48
6.	"I'll Get By (As Long as I Have You)"	Fred E. Ahlert, Roy Turk	2:56
7.	"If I Didn't Care"	Jack Lawrence	3:08
8.	"It's a Sin to Tell a Lie"	Billy Mayhew	2:18
9.	"We Three (My Echo, My Shadow and Me)"	Nelson Cogane, Sammy Mysels, Dick Robertson	3:06
10.	"When the Swallows Come Back to Capistrano"	Leon René	3:02

The 1982 and 1983 reissues feature the same 10 songs albeit with different track orders.

== Personnel ==
- Bill Kenny (uncredited) – tenor
- Michael Mendel – cover art of 1979 issue
- Gerry Krupa – cover art of 1982 reissue
- C. Bruce – cover art of 1983 reissue
