= Ace Harris =

American jazz pianist (1910–1964)

- Born: Asa Harris; April 1, 1910; New York City, New York, U.S.
- Died: June 11, 1964 (aged 54) Chicago, Illinois, U.S.
- Genre: Jazz
- Instruments: Piano
- Formerly of: Billy Steward Serenaders; Sunset Royal Serenaders; The Ink Spots; Hot Lips Page; The Erskine Hawkins Orchestra

Asa "Ace" Harris (April 1, 1910 – June 11, 1964) was an American jazz pianist, best known for his tenure with The Ink Spots.

== Biography ==
Harris was born in New York City and played in several territory bands in the 1930s, working with Billy Steward's Serenaders in 1932 and with Bill Mears' Sunset Royal Serenaders from 1935. In 1937 Harris took over leadership of the Sunset Royal Serenaders, and recorded with them that same year; he remained with the group until 1939.

In 1940 Harris became Pianist for Bill Kenny & The Ink Spots replacing Bob Benson. Harris can be heard playing piano with The Ink Spots on many Top 10 Pop hits including "Whispering Grass", "Maybe", "We Three (My Echo, My Shadow and Me)", "Java Jive", "I'll Never Smile Again", "I'd Climb The Highest Mountain", "We'll Meet Again", "Do I Worry", "Until The Real Thing Comes Along", "I Don't Want To Set The World On Fire", "Someone's Rocking My Dreamboat", "It's A Sin To Tell A Lie" and more. After Harris died in Chicago, Illinois in 1964, another Piano player named Johnny Harris toured with a group pretending to be The Ink Spots. This other Johnny Harris pretended to be the Johnny "Ace" Harris that recorded toured and appeared in movies with the original Ink Spots and made that claim until his death in 2000.

In 1944, Harris recorded with Hot Lips Page, then joined the Erskine Hawkins Orchestra, with whom he recorded several times. He played with Hawkins until 1947, he then returned to play with him again in 1950–51. Harris also recorded with small ensembles in the 1940s and with a jump blues band in 1951–52. He played at the Cloister Inn in Chicago in 1954.

A compact disc of Harris's recordings spanning 1937–52 was released by Jazz Classics in 2004.
