= Ink Spots (album) =

Studio album by Ink Spots
- Released: 1946
- Label: Decca

Ink Spots is an album by the American vocal group Ink Spots, released in 1946 by Decca Records.

== Release ==
The album was released as a set of four 10-inch 78-rpm phonograph records (cat. no. A-477).

== Reception ==
The album spent seven consecutive weeks at number one on Billboard's Best-Selling Popular Record Albums chart in September–November 1946.

It became Decca's "top selling record album over retail counters" of the year 1946.

== Track listing ==
Set of four 10-inch 78-rpm records (Decca A-477)

Side 1
No.	Title	Writer(s)	Length
1.	"If I Didn't Care"	Jack Lawrence

Side 2
No.	Title	Writer(s)	Length
1.	"Whispering Grass (Don't Tell the Trees)"	Fred Fisher—Doris Fisher

Side 3
No.	Title	Writer(s)	Length
1.	"Do I Worry?"	Stanley Cowan—Bobby Worth

Side 4
No.	Title	Writer(s)	Length
1.	"Java Jive"	Ben Oakland—Milton Drake

Side 5
No.	Title	Writer(s)	Length
1.	"We Three (My Echo, My Shadow and Me)"	Dick Robertson—Nelson Cogane—Sammy Mysels

Side 6
No.	Title	Writer(s)	Length
1.	"Maybe"	Allan Flynn—Frank Madden

Side 7
No.	Title	Writer(s)	Length
1.	"I'll Never Smile Again"	Ruth Lowe

Side 8
No.	Title	Writer(s)	Length
1.	"(It Will Have to Do) Until the Real Thing Comes Along"	Sammy Cahn—Saul Chaplin—L. E. Freeman

== Charts ==
Chart (1946)	Peak position
US Billboard Best-Selling Popular Record Albums	1

== See also ==
- List of Billboard Best-Selling Popular Record Albums number ones of 1946
