= Do I Worry? =

"Do I Worry"

Single by the Ink Spots
- B-side: "Java Jive"
- Released: 1940
- Recorded: 8 August 1940
- Genre: Rhythm and blues
- Length: 2:40
- Label: Decca
- Songwriters: Bobby Worth and Stanley Cowan

The Ink Spots singles chronology
"Java Jive" (1940)	"Do I Worry" (1940)	"My Greatest Mistake" (1940)

Do I Worry? is a song written by Bobby Worth and Stanley Cowan in 1940 that was recorded by The Ink Spots, whose recording reached #8 on the U.S. Pop charts. (Note: Joel Whitburn's methodology for creating pre-1940s chart placings has been criticised. "Joel Whitburn criticism: chart fabrication, misrepresentation of sources, cherry picking", and therefore should not be taken as definitive.)

“Do I Worry?” uses humour and sarcasm to mask emotional vulnerability. The narrator presents a detached, almost dismissive attitude towards their partner's infidelity, repeatedly insisting that they do not care. The song draws on 1940s wit and understatement, using phrases such as not caring “a bag of beans” and references to the “Iceman” to downplay the seriousness of the situation.

As the song develops, this composed exterior begins to break down. The humour feels increasingly forced, and it becomes clear that the narrator is not indifferent, but deeply affected. What initially appears to be confidence is revealed as denial, with the song ultimately expressing anxiety and heartbreak beneath the surface.

The song is featured in the 1942 Abbott and Costello film, Pardon My Sarong. In this film, the Ink Spots play singing waiters in a nightclub. They sing the ballad "Do I Worry?" and the swing song "Shout Brother Shout".

The song has featured in the films, Raging Bull, The Aviator, The Rover, and Queer.

The archived Vocal Group Hall of Fame featured Do I Worry? as one of five songs by The Ink Spots to be displayed on their profile.

== Other versions ==
- Frank Sinatra sung a version of the song with Tommy Dorsey and his orchestra released on The Song Is You. Also, featured on the 1988 compilation album titled Frank Sinatra & the Tommy Dorsey Orchestra.
- The song was covered by Kay Starr on her album Rockin' with Kay.
- Derrick Harriott released a version on his 1976 album Songs for Midnight Lovers.
- The song was featured on the 2012 album Pat Boone Sings A Tribute to the Ink Spots.
