= List of Billboard number-one singles of 1944 =

This is a list of number-one songs in the United States during the year 1944 according to The Billboard. Prior to the creation of the Billboard Hot 100, The Billboard published multiple singles charts each week. In 1944, the following two all-genre national singles charts were published:

- National Best Selling Retail Records – ranked the highest-selling singles in retail stores, as reported by merchants surveyed throughout the United States.
- Most Played Juke Box Records (introduced January 8) – ranked the most played songs in jukeboxes across the United States, as reported by machine operators.

Shown are the songs that topped the National Best Selling Retail Records and Most Played Juke Box Records charts in 1944.

Issue date	National Best Selling Retail Records	Most Played Juke Box Records	Ref.
January 1	"Paper Doll"; The Mills Brothers		
January 8	"Paper Doll"; The Mills Brothers	"Paper Doll"; The Mills Brothers	
January 15	"Paper Doll"; The Mills Brothers	"Shoo-Shoo Baby"; The Andrews Sisters with Vic Schoen and His Orchestra	
January 22	"Paper Doll"; The Mills Brothers	"Shoo-Shoo Baby"; The Andrews Sisters with Vic Schoen and His Orchestra	
January 29	"My Heart Tells Me (Should I Believe My Heart?)"; Glen Gray and the Casa Loma Orchestra with Eugenie Baird	"Shoo-Shoo Baby"; The Andrews Sisters with Vic Schoen and His Orchestra	
February 5	"My Heart Tells Me (Should I Believe My Heart?)"; Glen Gray and the Casa Loma Orchestra with Eugenie Baird	"Shoo-Shoo Baby"; The Andrews Sisters with Vic Schoen and His Orchestra	
February 12	"My Heart Tells Me (Should I Believe My Heart?)"; Glen Gray and the Casa Loma Orchestra with Eugenie Baird	"Shoo-Shoo Baby"; The Andrews Sisters with Vic Schoen and His Orchestra	
February 19	"My Heart Tells Me (Should I Believe My Heart?)"; Glen Gray and the Casa Loma Orchestra with Eugenie Baird	"Shoo-Shoo Baby"; The Andrews Sisters with Vic Schoen and His Orchestra	
February 26	"My Heart Tells Me (Should I Believe My Heart?)"; Glen Gray and the Casa Loma Orchestra with Eugenie Baird	"Shoo-Shoo Baby"; The Andrews Sisters with Vic Schoen and His Orchestra	
March 4	"Bésame Mucho (Kiss Me Much)"; Jimmy Dorsey and His Orchestra with Bob Eberly and Kitty Kallen	"Shoo-Shoo Baby"; The Andrews Sisters with Vic Schoen and His Orchestra	
March 11	"Bésame Mucho (Kiss Me Much)"; Jimmy Dorsey and His Orchestra with Bob Eberly and Kitty Kallen	"Shoo-Shoo Baby"; The Andrews Sisters with Vic Schoen and His Orchestra	
March 18	"Bésame Mucho (Kiss Me Much)"; Jimmy Dorsey and His Orchestra with Bob Eberly and Kitty Kallen	"Mairzy Doats"; The Merry Macs	
March 25	"Bésame Mucho (Kiss Me Much)"; Jimmy Dorsey and His Orchestra with Bob Eberly and Kitty Kallen	"Mairzy Doats"; The Merry Macs	
April 1	"Bésame Mucho (Kiss Me Much)"; Jimmy Dorsey and His Orchestra with Bob Eberly and Kitty Kallen	"Mairzy Doats"; The Merry Macs	
April 8	"Bésame Mucho (Kiss Me Much)"; Jimmy Dorsey and His Orchestra with Bob Eberly and Kitty Kallen	"Mairzy Doats"; The Merry Macs	
April 15	"Bésame Mucho (Kiss Me Much)"; Jimmy Dorsey and His Orchestra with Bob Eberly and Kitty Kallen	"Mairzy Doats"; The Merry Macs	
April 22	"It's Love-Love-Love"; Guy Lombardo and His Royal Canadians with Skip Nelson and the Lombardo Trio	"Bésame Mucho (Kiss Me Much)"; Jimmy Dorsey and His Orchestra with Bob Eberly and Kitty Kallen	
April 29	"It's Love-Love-Love"; Guy Lombardo and His Royal Canadians with Skip Nelson and the Lombardo Trio	"San Fernando Valley"; Bing Crosby with John Scott Trotter and His Orchestra	
May 6	"I Love You"; Bing Crosby with John Scott Trotter and His Orchestra	"San Fernando Valley"; Bing Crosby with John Scott Trotter and His Orchestra	
May 13	"I Love You"; Bing Crosby with John Scott Trotter and His Orchestra	"San Fernando Valley"; Bing Crosby with John Scott Trotter and His Orchestra	
May 20	"I Love You"; Bing Crosby with John Scott Trotter and His Orchestra	"San Fernando Valley"; Bing Crosby with John Scott Trotter and His Orchestra	
May 27	"I Love You"; Bing Crosby with John Scott Trotter and His Orchestra	"I Love You"; Bing Crosby with John Scott Trotter and His Orchestra	
June 3	"I Love You"; Bing Crosby with John Scott Trotter and His Orchestra	"San Fernando Valley"; Bing Crosby with John Scott Trotter and His Orchestra	
June 10	"I'll Get By (As Long as I Have You)"; Harry James and His Orchestra with Dick Haymes	"I Love You"; Bing Crosby with John Scott Trotter and His Orchestra	
June 17	"I'll Get By (As Long as I Have You)"; Harry James and His Orchestra with Dick Haymes	"I'll Get By (As Long as I Have You)"; Harry James and His Orchestra with Dick Haymes	
June 24	"I'll Get By (As Long as I Have You)"; Harry James and His Orchestra with Dick Haymes	"I'll Get By (As Long as I Have You)"; Harry James and His Orchestra with Dick Haymes	
July 1	"I'll Be Seeing You"; Bing Crosby with John Scott Trotter and His Orchestra	"I'll Get By (As Long as I Have You)"; Harry James and His Orchestra with Dick Haymes	
July 8	"I'll Get By (As Long as I Have You)"; Harry James and His Orchestra with Dick Haymes	"I'll Get By (As Long as I Have You)"; Harry James and His Orchestra with Dick Haymes	
July 15	"I'll Be Seeing You"; Bing Crosby with John Scott Trotter and His Orchestra	"I'll Get By (As Long as I Have You)"; Harry James and His Orchestra with Dick Haymes	
July 22	"I'll Be Seeing You"; Bing Crosby with John Scott Trotter and His Orchestra	"I'll Get By (As Long as I Have You)"; Harry James and His Orchestra with Dick Haymes	
July 29	"I'll Be Seeing You"; Bing Crosby with John Scott Trotter and His Orchestra	"G.I. Jive"; Louis Jordan and His Tympany Five	
August 5	"Swinging on a Star"; Bing Crosby with John Scott Trotter and His Orchestra and the Williams Brothers Quartet	"G.I. Jive"; Louis Jordan and His Tympany Five	
August 12	"Swinging on a Star"; Bing Crosby with John Scott Trotter and His Orchestra and the Williams Brothers Quartet	"G.I. Jive"; Louis Jordan and His Tympany Five	
August 19	"Swinging on a Star"; Bing Crosby with John Scott Trotter and His Orchestra and the Williams Brothers Quartet	"Swinging on a Star"; Bing Crosby with John Scott Trotter and His Orchestra and the Williams Brothers Quartet	
August 26	"Swinging on a Star"; Bing Crosby with John Scott Trotter and His Orchestra and the Williams Brothers Quartet	"Swinging on a Star"; Bing Crosby with John Scott Trotter and His Orchestra and the Williams Brothers Quartet	
September 2	"Swinging on a Star"; Bing Crosby with John Scott Trotter and His Orchestra and the Williams Brothers Quartet	"Swinging on a Star"; Bing Crosby with John Scott Trotter and His Orchestra and the Williams Brothers Quartet	
September 9	"Swinging on a Star"; Bing Crosby with John Scott Trotter and His Orchestra and the Williams Brothers Quartet	"Swinging on a Star"; Bing Crosby with John Scott Trotter and His Orchestra and the Williams Brothers Quartet	
September 16	"Swinging on a Star"; Bing Crosby with John Scott Trotter and His Orchestra and the Williams Brothers Quartet	"Swinging on a Star"; Bing Crosby with John Scott Trotter and His Orchestra and the Williams Brothers Quartet	
September 23	"Swinging on a Star"; Bing Crosby with John Scott Trotter and His Orchestra and the Williams Brothers Quartet	"Swinging on a Star"; Bing Crosby with John Scott Trotter and His Orchestra and the Williams Brothers Quartet	
September 30	"Swinging on a Star"; Bing Crosby with John Scott Trotter and His Orchestra and the Williams Brothers Quartet	"Swinging on a Star"; Bing Crosby with John Scott Trotter and His Orchestra and the Williams Brothers Quartet	
October 7	"You Always Hurt the One You Love"; The Mills Brothers	"Swinging on a Star"; Bing Crosby with John Scott Trotter and His Orchestra and the Williams Brothers Quartet	
October 14	"I'll Walk Alone"; Dinah Shore	"(There'll Be a) Hot Time in the Town of Berlin (When the Yanks Go Marching In)"; Bing Crosby and the Andrews Sisters with Vic Schoen and His Orchestra	
October 21	"You Always Hurt the One You Love"; The Mills Brothers	"(There'll Be a) Hot Time in the Town of Berlin (When the Yanks Go Marching In)"; Bing Crosby and the Andrews Sisters with Vic Schoen and His Orchestra	
October 28	"You Always Hurt the One You Love"; The Mills Brothers	"(There'll Be a) Hot Time in the Town of Berlin (When the Yanks Go Marching In)"; Bing Crosby and the Andrews Sisters with Vic Schoen and His Orchestra	
November 4	"I'll Walk Alone"; Dinah Shore	"(There'll Be a) Hot Time in the Town of Berlin (When the Yanks Go Marching In)"; Bing Crosby and the Andrews Sisters with Vic Schoen and His Orchestra	
November 11	"I'll Walk Alone"; Dinah Shore	"(There'll Be a) Hot Time in the Town of Berlin (When the Yanks Go Marching In)"; Bing Crosby and the Andrews Sisters with Vic Schoen and His Orchestra	
November 18	"I'll Walk Alone"; Dinah Shore	"(There'll Be a) Hot Time in the Town of Berlin (When the Yanks Go Marching In)"; Bing Crosby and the Andrews Sisters with Vic Schoen and His Orchestra	
November 25	"You Always Hurt the One You Love"; The Mills Brothers	"I'll Walk Alone"; Dinah Shore	
December 2	"You Always Hurt the One You Love"; The Mills Brothers	"Into Each Life Some Rain Must Fall"; The Ink Spots and Ella Fitzgerald	
December 9	"I'm Making Believe"; The Ink Spots and Ella Fitzgerald	"Into Each Life Some Rain Must Fall"; The Ink Spots and Ella Fitzgerald	
December 16	"I'm Making Believe"; The Ink Spots and Ella Fitzgerald	"Don't Fence Me In"; Bing Crosby and the Andrews Sisters with Vic Schoen and His Orchestra	
December 23	"Don't Fence Me In"; Bing Crosby and the Andrews Sisters with Vic Schoen and His Orchestra	"Don't Fence Me In"; Bing Crosby and the Andrews Sisters with Vic Schoen and His Orchestra	
December 30	"Don't Fence Me In"; Bing Crosby and the Andrews Sisters with Vic Schoen and His Orchestra	"Don't Fence Me In"; Bing Crosby and the Andrews Sisters with Vic Schoen and His Orchestra	

== Number-one artists ==
List of number-one artists by total weeks at number one
Artists	Weeks at #1
Bing Crosby	20
The Mills Brothers	9
Jimmy Dorsey	7
Glen Gray & the Casa Loma Orchestra	5
Dinah Shore	4
Harry James	4
Guy Lombardo	2
Ella Fitzgerald	2
The Ink Spots	2
The Andrews Sisters	2

== See also ==
- 1944 in music
