= Eddie Lane (songwriter) =

American songwriter

Eddie Lane is an American songwriter. He was director of public relations for Muzak.

His song "Bless You, for Being an Angel" (written jointly with Don Baker) has been recorded by many artists, including The Ink Spots, Fats Waller, The Chords, Brendan Bowyer and Glenn Miller (vocal: Ray Eberle).
