= Address Unknown =

Address Unknown may refer to:

- Address Unknown (novel), a 1938 short novel by Kathrine Taylor
- Address Unknown (1935 film), a Hungarian comedy directed by Béla Gaál
- Address Unknown (1944 film), an American film based on Taylor's novel, directed by William Cameron Menzies
- Address Unknown (1986 film), an American film directed by John Gianvito
- Address Unknown (1997 film), an American film starring Kyle Howard
- Address Unknown (2001 film), a South Korean film directed by Kim Ki-duk
- "Address Unknown", a 1939 No. 1 hit song by The Ink Spots
- Address Unknown, a radio program written by Ross Napier
- Address Unknown, a fictional television show in the video games Max Payne and Max Payne 2
