= Address Unknown (song) =

Single by the Ink Spots
- B-side: "You Bring Me Down"
- Released: 1939
- Genre: Vocal jazz
- Length: 2:57
- Label: Decca
- Songwriters: Carmen Lombardo; Dedette Lee Hill; Johnny Mark

The Ink Spots singles chronology
"Brown Gal" (1938)	"Address Unknown" (1939)	"It's Funny to Everyone But Me" (1939)

"Address Unknown" is a song by American vocal jazz group the Ink Spots. Released as a shellac single in 1939, the song was the Ink Spots' highest charting song at #1 until their cover of "We Three (My Echo, My Shadow and Me)". "Address Unknown" is a standalone single, and was not released on any Ink Spots album. "Address Unknown" was initially used as a B-side to "Bless You For Being An Angel" and "You Bring Me Down". Later in 1939, a shellac was released with "You Bring Me Down" as the B-side after the charting success of "Address Unknown".

"Address Unknown" experienced a resurgence in popularity after its 2015 inclusion in the series premiere of Better Call Saul, the spinoff prequel series to Breaking Bad.

== Composition ==
"Address Unknown" begins with a twangy guitar intro, before it switches over to a piano and choral instrumental as the Ink Spots sing the first verse and the chorus. The song details someone with an unknown street address, someone with "not even a trace" of their existence. The song then transitions into a spoken word part, the reader saying that he'd "give anything in the world" to see the face of the song's subject. The chorus repeats again, and the song fades out.

== Release ==
"Address Unknown" was initially released as a shellac 10" standalone single, used as a B-side twice for both "Bless You For Being An Angel" and "You Bring Me Down". Later, in 1939, a shellac as released with "You Bring Me Down" as the B-side after "Address Unknown"'s charting success.

"Address Unknown" was released as the second track on the fifth side of Best of the Ink Spots, a triple-LP compilation curated by Murray Hill Records in 1979.

== Usage in Better Call Saul ==
"Address Unknown" experienced a resurgence in popularity and public interest after its usage in the 2015 series premiere of American crime drama series and Breaking Bad spinoff Better Call Saul.

The scene in question, the first scene in the series and shot entirely in black-and-white, features series protagonist Jimmy McGill (portrayed by Bob Odenkirk) as Gene Takavic after his illegal adoption of a fake identity created by Ed Galbraith after the events of Breaking Bad's "Granite State". Gene is a struggling and paranoid Omaha, Nebraska Cinnabon manager, and, when he is alone at his house, reminisces about his old days as Saul Goodman, watching his now-old television commercials from VHS tapes. Throughout the entire scene, "Address Unknown" is playing.

Series creators Vince Gilligan and Peter Gould spoke to Rolling Stone about the inclusion of "Address Unknown" in "Uno". Gould explains that the scene being shot in black-and-white could have motivated him to include "Address Unknown", seeming to "call for a different tone or... music from a different era." Gilligan commented that Thomas Golubić chose "Address Unknown" for inclusion in "Uno", commenting that "(Golubić) finds the most interesting and perfectly off-the-wall songs for when we're doing what we call needle drops." Gilligan further elaborates, stating that "Address Unknown" evokes a sense of wistfulness, and that the song indicates that Saul Goodman has "this feeling of bygone days, of better days that you've now passed." Vulture contributor Mike Powell stated that "Address Unknown" "conjures simpler times than the ones we know we’re getting into."

"Address Unknown" was soon rereleased with the subtitle "(From Better Call Saul)".

Another Ink Spots song, "We Three (My Echo, My Shadow and Me)" (a cover of the Frank Sinatra and Tommy Dorsey Orchestra song of the same name), was later similarly used in the Gene Takavic opening scene in "Smoke", the first episode from Better Call Saul's 4th season.

== Tracklisting ==
No.	Title	Writer(s)	Length
1.	"Address Unknown"	Carmen Lombardo, Dedette Lee Hill, Johnny Mark	2:56
2.	"You Bring Me Down"	Gene de Paul, Roy Jacobs	3:17
Total length:			6:13

== Charts ==
Charts	Peak position
US Pop Charts	1
