= Tip, Tap and Toe =

Tip, Tap, and Toe were a seminal African-American tap-dance comedy act that began in the late 1920s and appeared in several motion pictures in the 1930s and '40s. Its original members were Sammy Green, Teddy Frazier, and Raymond Winfield. At times it included Freddie James and Prince Spencer, also a member of The Four Step Brothers. They worked for Eddie Cantor at Palace Theatre in New York and performed on their own at the Paramount Theatre, and were in George White's Scandals of 1936 and the Cotton Club Review. African-Americans were generally not allowed to star in major motion pictures in the 1930s and '40s, but specialty acts, such as Tip, Tap, and Toe, were permitted, and the group appeared in at least five major Hollywood films during that time.

According to the Library of Congress Performing Arts Database

They were among the first to line up and tap the same sounds using different steps or the same steps making different sounds, and then to build on that idea. Raymond Winfield is said to have contributed to the act's innovative slides. Working on a small oval platform, Winfield slid forward, backward, sideways, and around, as if he had buttered feet on a hot stove: gravity-defying balance with a maximum of activity on a minimum of space.

== Filmography ==
- By Request (1935 short)
- Scandals (1936)
- You Can't Have Everything (1937),
- Pardon My Sarong (1942) with The Ink Spots
- All by Myself (1943),
- Honeymoon Lodge (1943), with Frank Veloz
- Hi, Good Lookin'! (1944), with Louis DaPron.
- The Human Tornado (1976), Sammy Green only

== Television appearances ==
- Cavalcade of Bands
  - Episode 2.3 (1950)
  - Episode 2.17 (1951)
- The Ken Murray Show (1950)
- Van Heflin/Mel Torme (1950)
- The Milton Berle Show
  - with guest host Morey Amsterdam (1948)
  - Episode 1.49 (1949)
