= Herb Kenny =

American singer (1914–1992)

- Born: June 12, 1914; Philadelphia, Pennsylvania, US
- Died: November 7, 1992 (aged 78) Columbia, Maryland
- Instrument: Vocals
- Years active: 1940s–1992
- Formerly of: The Ink Spots

Herbert Cornelius Kenny (June 12, 1914 — July 11, 1992) was an American singer. He was the bass singer for The Ink Spots from 1945 to 1951 which included his twin brother Bill as lead tenor.

== Early life ==
Herbert C. Kenny was born in Mercy Hospital in Philadelphia as the younger twin to Bill. Kenny's father, William Francis Kenny Sr., died of influenza in 1919 when Herb was five years old. That same year Herb's mother, Jennie, moved the family to Washington, D.C. and then to Baltimore, Maryland where she worked as a hairdresser to support the family; in his childhood, Herb and his twin attended St. Peter Claver high, Booker T. Washington Junior high and graduated from Frederick Douglass High School. Kenny and his family lived at 1151 Carey Street.

== Career ==
In the early 1940s, Herb and Bill were members of the vocal group, The Cabineers, however neither one of them ever sang on a recording. In March 1945, Bill, who by now was the lead tenor in The Ink Spots, asked Herb to join on bass vocals to replace Orville "Hoppy" Jones who had died after collapsing on stage in October 1944. He was replaced in May 1951 by Adriel McDonald after he overslept and missed a radio show in Buffalo, New York; Herb and Bill got into a big fight over this and Herb ultimately decided to leave.

Kenny went on to perform as a solo act. His first solo work was as a brief feature spot with Buddy Hawkins and the Key Notes. He signed to Aladdin Records and in 1952 formed "Herb Kenny and The Comets". The Comets were an all-white band initially called The Rockets and had previously backed Perry Como. He continued to sing until 1957 when he moved to Washington to work as a program director and announcer at a radio washington; he semi-retired in 1966 when he decided to restart his singing career. He also sang in many different groups calling themselves The Ink Spots.Herb Kenny's last performance was in April 1992, three months before his death, when he was inducted into the Hall of Fame of the United in Group Harmony Association.

== Personal life and death ==
Kenny settled in Columbia, Maryland. He spent most of his final years as an avid golfer, playing daily at a local golf club. Herb also worked in charity, including work with "Childrens Choir of Columbia, Maryland" and "The United College Fund". Kenny died of cancer on July 11, 1992 aged 78. He was survived by his wife, Minnie McNeal Kenny, two children and seven grandchildren.

== Solo discography ==
- "Key To My Heart / Why Do I Love You" — Aladdin — recorded with "Herb Kenny and his Trio" — February 1950
- "Only You / When The Lights Go On Again (All Over The World)" — Federal — June 1952
- "My Song / You Never Heard A Word I Said" — MGM — September 1952
- "I Don't Care (As Long As You Care For Me) / Calling You" — recorded with "The Rockets" — MGM — November 1952
- "I Miss You So / Take A Little (Leave A Little)" — MGM — 1953
- "Don't Take My Word / Do I Have You Tell You I'm Sorry" — MGM — 1953
- "(I Dreamed Of A) Star Sprangled Dawn / But Always Your Friend" — MGM — April 1953
