= I'm Making Believe =

Single by the Ink Spots and Ella Fitzgerald
- A-side: "Into Each Life Some Rain Must Fall"
- Released: October 1944
- Recorded: August 30, 1944
- Label: Decca
- Composer: James V. Monaco
- Lyricist: Mack Gordon
- Producer: Milt Gabler

"I'm Making Believe" is a 1944 song composed by James V. Monaco with lyrics by Mack Gordon. The song first appeared in the film Sweet and Low-Down; the performance by Benny Goodman and His Orchestra was nominated for the Academy Award for Best Original Song. The version recorded by the Ink Spots and Ella Fitzgerald topped The Billboard's National Best Selling Retail Records chart for two weeks in 1944. Their version had sold over one million copies by the time of Fitzgerald's death in 1996.

== Composition and appearance in Sweet and Low-Down ==
"I'm Making Believe" was composed by James V. Monaco with lyrics by Mack Gordon. It first appeared in the 1944 film Sweet and Low-Down, in which it is performed by Benny Goodman and His Orchestra. Their rendition earned the film an Academy Award nomination for Best Original Song.

== The Ink Spots and Ella Fitzgerald recording ==
On August 30, 1944, Ella Fitzgerald and the vocal group the Ink Spots recorded the vocals for "I'm Making Believe" and "Into Each Life Some Rain Must Fall" in New York City for producer Milt Gabler. "I'm Making Believe" was recorded with two opposing choruses by Fitzgerald and Ink Spots member Bill Kenny. The single was released in November 1944 as a 78-rpm disc by Decca Records.

== Other versions ==
"I'm Making Believe" was also recorded by the Three Suns, Hal McIntyre and Mark Warnow. In 2023, Orville Peck and King Princess contributed a version of the song to the soundtrack of the National Geographic biographical drama miniseries A Small Light.

== Reception ==
The Billboard praised the pairing of Fitzgerald and the Ink Spots, predicting the song would be popular among both jukebox and phonograph listeners. DownBeat wrote of it: "[Fitzgerald] really tears this one apart … She's never done anything like it, and her vocal is actually thrilling."

== Chart performance ==
The Ink Spots' and Fitzgerald's recording of "I'm Making Believe" topped The Billboard's National Best Selling Retail Records chart for two consecutive weeks in December 1944. It also peaked at number three on the magazine's Most Played Jukebox Records chart. In 1945, their version peaked at number two on the Harlem Hit Parade and number five on the Records Most Played on the Air chart, both published by The Billboard. Hal McIntyre's cover of the song peaked at number 14 on the magazine's Records Most Played on the Air chart.

== In popular culture ==
The Ink Spots' version of the song featuring Ella Fitzgerald appeared in the ''BioShock 2'' downloadable content ''Minerva's Den'', during the loading screen that appears before the boss fight.

== See also ==
- List of Billboard number-one singles of 1944
