= Digger (soundtrack) =

2026 film soundtrack album

Digger (Original Motion Picture Soundtrack)

Film score by Cosmo Sheldrake
- Released: October 2, 2026
- Genre: Film score
- Length: 40:17
- Label: WaterTower Music
- Producer: Cosmo Sheldrake

Cosmo Sheldrake chronology
Eye to the Ear (2026)	Digger (2026)

Digger (Original Soundtrack) is the film score composed by Cosmo Sheldrake to the 2026 film Digger directed by Alejandro González Iñárritu. The album featured 24 individual score tracks composed by Sheldrake. The album was released day-and-date with the film on October 2, 2026, by WaterTower Music.

== Development ==
In October 2026, it was announced that English musician Cosmo Sheldrake would compose the score, in his feature film composing debut. Iñárritu approached Sheldrake during January 2026, and insisted him to compose the score as he had listened to a piece "Nightingale Pt. 1" from Wake Up Calls (2020). Iñárritu acknowledged that finding the right sound for Digger was challenging as the film travels through "different times, spaces, fictions, realities and many layers" and when he listened to the piece composed by Sheldrake, which was recorded using the birdsongs from endangered species, he eventually liked it and felt the natural sounds being perfect for the film. After his involvement, Sheldrake adapted the piece as the opening cue of the film titled "Avian Elegy".

When Iñárritu met Sheldrake, the latter had shown him some of the sketches he had worked before their meeting. After finalizing the main sound for the film, the other aspect they want to focus on is how to keep the tone of the music, which had to be playful and absurd but maintain some composure. Sheldrake worked on the music while the film was in shooting and also during the post-production so that it allowed time for the music to converse with the visuals and also make the music fit the appropriate scenes during editing. Conor O'Neill assembled the music during editing to fit the specific scenes.

The score utilizes traditional orchestration and instruments, but also included the unconventional musical sounds mostly resembled nature. "Avian Elegy" was recorded using the sounds of nightingale, bittern, ring ouzel and long-eared owl, while "Drowning" featured a humpback whale, long-horned sculpin, sounds of haddock courting and the echolocating of a sperm whale. Sheldrake considered the significance of incorporating those voices in the music given the themes and subjects that the film explores. All of Sheldrake's music was recorded at his home studio in the United Kingdom. Producer Mary Parent noted that while Sheldrake's involvement was a bold choice considering his lack of prior experience with composing for a film, his involvement was appropriate "given how original and specific the film is."

== Release ==
The soundtrack album was released digitally by WaterTower Music label on October 2, 2026, alongside the film's release. Physical editions of the albums were distributed by Mutant in CDs and LPs and is scheduled to release by December 2026.

== Reception ==
Tim Grierson of Screen International wrote "Cosmo Sheldrake's jittery score only heightens the disorientation and paranoia". Robert Daniels of RogerEbert.com described it as a "deafening score". Justin Chang of The New Yorker stated that Sheldrake's score ensures the bombast in the film. Bilge Ebiri of Vulture described it as an "overinsistent score".

== Additional music ==
In addition to the score, the film features the popular late 1940s songs, "If I Didn't Care" and "I Don't Want to Set the World on Fire" performed by the Ink Spots and "Look What They've Done to My Song, Ma" by Melanie featured in the closing credits.

== Track listing ==
No.	Title	Length
1.	"Avian Elegy"	3:08
2.	"Dr. Berg"	0:36
3.	"Calving Glacier"	0:49
4.	"Solarium"	1:50
5.	"Is That a Cow?"	2:56
6.	"Grandaddy Oil"	1:34
7.	"Fossil Fools"	2:02
8.	"Ace in the Hole"	0:50
9.	"Amused to Death"	0:58
10.	"This Sacred Promise"	1:09
11.	"Planetary Devastation"	2:04
12.	"Blah Blah Blah"	1:12
13.	"Sinking in Chaos"	1:41
14.	"Did You Drink All That?"	2:06
15.	"Blow It Up"	0:42
16.	"Doesn't Matter"	1:05
17.	"Oil Rig"	5:23
18.	"Loaves and Fishes"	2:16
19.	"Comfort of Your Unsustainable Lives"	1:19
20.	"Six Million Barrels a Day"	2:11
21.	"Drowning"	1:15
22.	"Judy"	1:03
23.	"Ifs, Possibles and Coulds"	1:02
24.	"Avian Elegy (Reprise)"	1:06
Total length:		40:17
