= The Rover (soundtrack) =

The Rover (Original Motion Picture Soundtrack)

Film score / soundtrack album by various artists
- Released: 10 October 2014
- Recorded: 2014
- Genre: Alternative rock; indie pop; electronic
- Length: 61:33
- Label: Lakeshore
- Producer: Antony Partos

Antony Partos chronology
33 Postcards (2011)	The Rover (Original Motion Picture Soundtrack) (2014)	99 Homes (2014)

The Rover (Original Motion Picture Soundtrack) is the soundtrack to the 2014 film The Rover directed by David Michôd. The album consisted of cues from the musical score is composed by Australian film and television composer Antony Partos and selections from Sam Petty, Colin Stetson, Matthias Loibner, William Basinski and Tortoise which were mostly compilations of alternative rock, indie pop and electronic. The soundtrack was released through Lakeshore Records on 10 October 2014, four months after the film's release.

== Development ==
In October 2013, it was announced that Antony Partos, who previously scored Michôd's Animal Kingdom (2010), would compose the score for The Rover. Musician Sam Petty who previously worked with Michôd on Animal Kingdom and Hesher (2010) selected the musical pieces for the film. The music for the film featured contributions from saxophonists Colin Stetson, William Basinski, hurdy-gurdy player Matthias Loibner, and music from post-rock bands and pop artists.

Michôd found that using pieces from saxophonists Stetson and Basinski would help his ideas to examine music in the clearest and easiest ways possible on how it is incorporated into the film in its key sequences. Those pieces were not only used as temp tracks, but an ideal part of the musical fabric he designed. Originally, he also selected "Don't Cha" by The Pussycat Dolls to use in a crucial scene in the film involving Rey (played by Pattinson) but later changed it to "Pretty Girl Rock" by Keri Hilson.

According to Partos, the music was a simpler process than Animal Kingdom, where Petty worked with tonal based textures that would streamline the process for the film; he would send temp mixes and individual sounds to Petty so that the musical palette could be established much earlier. He was tasked to build the love and trust between the two main characters irrespective of their circumstances, adding that "there is a subtle yet tangible shift that develops two thirds of the way through the story and the score does change in this regard to become more harmonically based compared to the textures that are present in the first half of the film."

Partos recorded the bass and baritones at the usual register, while also played the harmonics and notes at their extreme high end. He would manipulate those elements octaves below or higher than the original pitch that would create a "somehow tender but simultaneously alien" mood, which was similarly evoked through bass, Irish whistles and strings. The strings were recorded individually and combined with the "bastardized custom made violins" with strings which could play in either viola or cello pitch as well as electric violin, so that it would create a mood which was "subtly emotional but somehow unfamiliar and lonely."

== Release ==
The soundtrack album was not released along with the film, although few tracks were published on an IndieWire article after the premiere in 2014 Cannes Film Festival. On 24 September 2014, Lakeshore Records announced the film's soundtrack and released in a digital format on 10 October 2014, followed by a physical release on 14 November 2014.

== Reception ==
Scott Foundas of Variety wrote that Partos' original score "immeasurably enhanced the mood" and "compensates for the film’s spare dialogue with an inspired mix of industrial shrieks, tribal drumbeats and wails, and fleeting snatches of melody. The rich soundscape is further enhanced by sound designer Sam Petty’s crisply recorded and mixed effects, which bring every humming electric light, chirping cricket and whirring engine to the fore." Jonathan Romney of The Guardian wrote "Antony Partos's score features guitar that veer from grungy metallic rasp to a baleful, distant dead clang, and Sam Petty's sound design – insects, raspy motors, the death-rattle crunch of gravel – is meshed in wonderfully." Julian Roman of MovieWeb wrote " The score by Antony Partos also adds to the deeply unsettling nature of this film."

Todd McCarthy of The Hollywood Reporter called it as an "extraordinary soundtrack, which, in its wild, idiosyncratic weirdness, is probably the most effectively eccentric and radical film score since Jonny Greenwood's for There Will Be Blood. Composed by Australian Antony Partos, with heavy contributions from sound designer and additional composer Sam Petty and existing source music, the track moans, cracks and wails with bizarre audible elements that blur the line between music and natural sounds and emanate from instruments both identifiable and not. The effect is both hypnotic and disturbing, pertinent to what’s onscreen and out of nowhere. In all events, it magnifies and enhances the already intense nature of the experience."

Ann Hornaday of The Washington Post called it as a "harsh, dissonant electronic score", while Kenneth Turan of Los Angeles Times described it as "ominous" and "disquieting". Kiya Reardon of The Globe and Mail wrote "Antony Partos's subtle score and a soundtrack featuring the ambient rhythms of the post-punk group Tortoise add to the eerie, threatening tone."

== Track listing ==
The Rover (Original Motion Picture Soundtrack) track listing
No.	Title	Artist(s)	Length
1.	"Four Day Interval"	Tortoise	4:44
2.	"Arrival"	Antony Partos	2:36
3.	"(No) Vacancy"	Sam Petty	4:32
4.	"Crossfire"	Sam Petty	2:47
5.	"Campfire"	Antony Partos	2:21
6.	"Groundswell"	Colin Stetson	1:40
7.	"Pit Stop"	Antony Partos	1:53
8.	"Deja-Vu"	Sam Petty	3:40
9.	"Homecoming"	Antony Partos	3:51
10.	"Bonfire"	Antony Partos	4:15
11.	"Crystal Waters"	Matthias Loibner	3:55
12.	"Two Themes for Rey"	Sam Petty	1:16
13.	"Motel"	Antony Partos	2:54
14.	"Variation VI"	William Basinski	9:18
15.	"Variation V"	William Basinski	15:11
Total length:			61:33

== Additional music ==
Film music not included in the album
#	Title	Artist(s)
1	"Meak Mer Nov Odor Meanchhey"	Savy Heng and James Cecil
2	"Backpack"	Gabby La La
3	"Trilogy – The Three Ages of Man: Memories"	Frances-Marie Uitti
4	"Time is Advancing with Fitful Irregularity"	Colin Stetson
5	"As a Bird or Branch"	Colin Stetson
6	"Awake on Foreign Shores"	Colin Stetson
7	"Ko–Tha–Three Dances Of Shiva: Transcription For Double Bass By Fernando Grillo – I"	Robert Black
8	"Do I Worry?"	The Ink Spots
9	"Djed"	Tortoise
10	"I Heard the Voice of Jesus Say"	Pattie Rosemon with Frank and Odie Rosemon
11	"Pretty Girl Rock"	Keri Hilson
12	"Gone"	Clearside (featured in the first trailer)

== Accolades ==
Accolades for The Rover (Original Motion Picture Soundtrack)
Year	Award	Category	Recipient	Result
2014	AACTA Awards (4th)	Best Original Music Score	Antony Partos	Nominated
2014	AACTA Awards (4th)	Best Original Music Score	Sam Petty	Nominated
2014	AACTA Awards (4th)	Best Sound	Sam Petty	Won
2014	AACTA Awards (4th)	Best Sound	Des Kenneally	Won
2014	AACTA Awards (4th)	Best Sound	Justine Angus	Won
2014	AACTA Awards (4th)	Best Sound	Brooke Trezise	Won
2014	AACTA Awards (4th)	Best Sound	Francis Ward Lindsay	Won
2014	AACTA Awards (4th)	Best Sound	Robert Mackenzie	Won
2014	Australian Screen Sound Guild Awards	Best Film Sound Recording	Des Kenneally	Won
2014	Australian Screen Sound Guild Awards	Best Film Sound Recording	Marco Arlotta	Won
2014	Australian Screen Sound Guild Awards	Best Film Sound Recording	Rob Nokes	Won
2015	Film Critics Circle of Australia	Best Music Score	Antony Partos	Nominated
