= Bibbidi-Bobbidi-Boo =

1948 song from Disney's Cinderella

Song

from the album Cinderella (1950 film soundtrack)
- Written: 1948
- Recorded: October 26, 1949
- Genre: Soundtrack
- Songwriters: Mack David; Al Hoffman; Jerry Livingston

Official Video
- "Bibbidi-Bobbidi-Boo" on YouTube

"Bibbidi-Bobbidi-Boo" (also called "The Magic Song") is a novelty song, written in 1948 by Al Hoffman, Mack David, and Jerry Livingston. Performed in the 1950 film Cinderella, by actress Verna Felton, the song is sung by the Fairy Godmother as she transforms an orange pumpkin into a white carriage, four brown mice into white horses, a gray horse into a white-haired coachman and a brown dog into a white-haired footman. The song was nominated for the Academy Award for Best Original Song in 1951 but lost out to "Mona Lisa" from Captain Carey, U.S.A. Disney used the song once again in their 2015 remake of Cinderella which starred Lily James in the leading role. The song was performed by Helena Bonham Carter, who plays Fairy Godmother, and was the final song of the movie, playing with the end credits. Bonham Carter's version can also be found as the 30th song on the original movie soundtrack.

== Recording ==
Ilene Woods and the Woodsmen with Harold Mooney and His Orchestra recorded the song in Hollywood on October 26, 1949. It was released by RCA Victor Records as catalog number 31-00138B and by EMI on the His Master's Voice label as catalog numbers B 9970, SG 2371, HM 3755 and JM 2678.

A recording by Perry Como and The Fontane Sisters was the most popular. It was recorded on November 7, 1949, and released by RCA Victor Records as a 78 rpm single (catalog number 20-3607-B) and as a 45 rpm single (catalog number 47-3113-B). The flip side was "A Dream Is a Wish Your Heart Makes". The recording reached number 14 on the Billboard chart. The same single was released in the United Kingdom by EMI on the His Master's Voice label as a 78 rpm single (catalog number B 9961). It was also released with catalogue numbers HN 2730, X 7279, SAB 8 and IP 615.

Another recording, by Jo Stafford and Gordon MacRae, was released by Capitol Records as catalog number 782. The record first reached the Billboard charts on December 16, 1949, and lasted 7 weeks on the chart, peaking at number 19. It was backed with "Echoes" on the flip side.

On the Cash Box Best-Selling Record charts, where all versions were combined, the song reached number 7.

The Kings Men performed the song on the Fibber McGee and Molly radio program on January 10, 1950.

Bing Crosby recorded the song with Vic Schoen and His Orchestra on January 3, 1950. Dinah Shore also recorded the song on September 9, 1949. It is currently in the compilation of 1992 Sony Music (Legacy label) album "Zip A Dee Doo Dah".

This song was used in a Gatorade commercial starring Sergio Ramos, Leo Messi, David Luiz, and Landon Donovan promoting the 2014 FIFA World Cup.

The first line of the lyric was used as a mantra by Nellie McKay in a Guy Noir skit during episode 1482, January 24, 2015, of A Prairie Home Companion.

== Covers ==
In 1955, Jack Pleis recorded it for his album, Music from Disneyland.

In the Disney/Square Enix crossover game Kingdom Hearts Birth by Sleep, the song has been reorchestrated by Yoko Shimomura as the theme tune for the Cinderella world Castle of Dreams.

Louis Armstrong covered it and the recording was released in 1968 on Disney's Buena Vista Label (F-469).

In 1975, Bando Da Lua recorded it for the album, Bando Da Lua Nos E.U.A.

In 1980 Mino Reitano and Luca Chinnici recorded it (in Italian) for the album Ciao amico (Hello friend) with Italian text by Devilli.

In 1987, Sharon, Lois & Bram recorded and performed it for their television series Sharon, Lois & Bram's Elephant Show for the episode titled "Cooking School".

On the 2012 album Disney - Koe no Oujisama, which features various Japanese voice actors covering Disney songs, this song was covered by Jun Fukuyama.

On SpongeBob SquarePants, a similar sounding tune is heard sometimes such as when Squidward was playing a piece on his clarinet that incorporates a similar sounding tune as seen in the episode, "Squid Wood".

On House of Mouse, Jafar and Iago help Mickey and friends bring the clubhouse back after Daisy accidentally made it disappear by doing a duet version of "Bibbidi-Bobbidi-Boo" as seen in the episode, "House of Magic".

Helena Bonham Carter, who plays the Fairy Godmother in the Disney 2015 film remake, recorded the song for the film's soundtrack.

== In popular culture ==
Akira Toriyama named three characters in Dragon Ball after this song: the evil wizard Bibbidi, his son Bobbidi, and Bibbidi's powerful creation Majin Boo. However, these names are spelt as "Bibidi", "Babidi", and "Majin Buu" respectively, in the English dub of the animated adaption. Also, two characters of the arcade game Dragon Ball Heroes are also named after the song: the Majin Hero Salaga and the demon Mechickaboola.

The song is parodied on the Pinky, Elmyra & the Brain episode "Narfily Ever After", a parody of Cinderella.

A parody version recorded by Mickey Katz is entitled "The Baby, the Bubbe, and You".

The lyrics of the song are algebraically analyzed in a math lesson by Mr. Garrison in the South Park episode "Royal Pudding".

The title of the song is sung several times in Buck-Tick's song "Django!!! -Genwaku no Django-" from their album Razzle Dazzle.

This phrase is often referenced in other Disney stories, mostly when magic is being used. For example, in The Return of Jafar, and also in the Hercules TV series, in One Saturday Morning, episode 12: "Hercules and the Gorgon".

The popular radio show My Favorite Husband episode which aired on July 27, 1950, makes fun of the nonsense words of this song. The title of the episode is "Liz Writes A Song".

The film Shrek 2 features a parody of the song, sung by Fiona's fairy godmother.

The Tim Conway Jr. Show, on KFI Radio in Los Angeles, California, sometimes plays a version of the song in which the singer is interrupted by an Angry Doug Steckler who criticizes the song's math skills.

Female members of SM Entertainment's pre-debut trainees team SM Rookies Koeun, Hina, and Lami covered a Korean version of the song in the Disney Channel Korea show The Mickey Mouse Club in 2015.

The line "Bibbidi bobbidi" is mentioned again in the song "9 & 3/4 (Run Away)" by HYBE's Tomorrow X Together in 2019.

The line "Bibbidi bobbidi boo" is mentioned again in Josh's rap line of the song "Bazinga" by SB19 in 2021.

The Bibbidi Bobbidi Boutique is a Cinderella-inspired makeover salon in Disney Parks named for this song.

In the film Disenchanted, a business named "Bibidi Bobidi Butchers" is seen after the town is transformed.

== See also ==
- Non-lexical vocables in music
- Supercalifragilisticexpialidocious
