= Somethin' Smith and the Redheads =

American vocal group

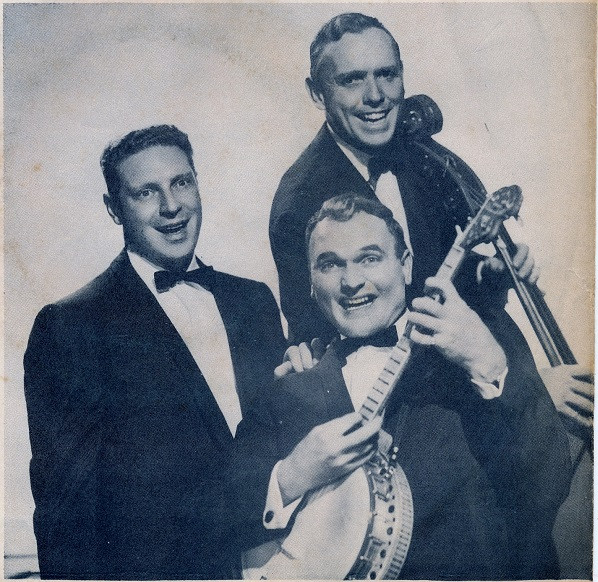

Background information
- Origin: University of California, Los Angeles
- Genres: Pop; Vocals; Banjo
- Years active: 1955–1966
- Labels: Epic Records; MGM Records
- Past members: Major Short; Robert H. Robinson; Saul Striks

Somethin' Smith and the Redheads were an American vocal group, doing mostly pop standards in the 1950s. Their biggest hit single was "It's a Sin to Tell a Lie" in 1955, which reached number seven in the Billboard Hot 100 chart. The following year they reached number 27 with their cover version of "In a Shanty in Old Shanty Town". Both releases were issued on the Epic Records label.

The group consisted of Smith (Robert Hugh (Red) Robinson, September 23, 1922 – December 6, 2002; vocals, banjo, and guitar), Saul Striks (December 8, 1924 – December 3, 1979; piano) and Major Short (June 22, 1924 – March 30, 2018; double bass).

Minor chart records included "Heartaches", "Ace in the Hole", and "You Always Hurt The One You Love". In 1961, they recorded their final album for the MGM label, which also resulted in one final single being released from the album.

The trio parted ways in 1966. Saul Striks began a new group called the Saloonatics with himself on piano and Ralph J. Guenther on bass and banjo.

Striks died from a heart attack whilst visiting Chicago, on December 3, 1979, at the age of 54. Robinson died in Salisbury, Maryland on December 6, 2002, at the age of 80.

Short lived in Hilton Head Island, South Carolina, where he got into the banjo hall of fame, until he died on March 30, 2018, at the age of 93.
