= Bill Kenny (singer) =

American vocalist (1914–1978)

- Bill Kenny

Background information
- Also known as: Mr. Ink Spot
- Born: William Francis Kenny Jr. June 12, 1914; Philadelphia, Pennsylvania, U.S.
- Died: March 23, 1978 (aged 63) New Westminster, British Columbia, Canada
- Genres: Traditional pop; rhythm and blues; doo-wop; rock and roll; easy listening; jazz; gospel
- Occupations: Musician; composer; lyricist; television host; author; poet
- Instrument: Vocals
- Years active: 1932–1978
- Labels: Decca, Mercury, Warwick, RCA, TEL, AUB, X (later Vik)

William Francis Kenny Jr. (June 12, 1914 – March 23, 1978) was an American vocalist with a wide vocal range spanning four octaves. Often regarded as one of the most influential high-tenor singers of all time, Kenny was noted for his "bell-like" vocal clarity and impeccable diction. Although he is most famous for his role as lead tenor with the Ink Spots, Kenny also led a successful solo career after disbanding the Ink Spots in 1954. Throughout the 1950s and 60s Kenny recorded, toured the world and appeared on many popular variety television shows. In 1966 Kenny became the star and host of his own musical variety show The Bill Kenny Show which aired on CBC. In 1989, 11 years after his death, Bill Kenny was inducted into the Rock and Roll Hall of Fame. Kenny is often noted as being the "godfather" of R&B tenor vocalists.

== Early life and education ==
Kenny was born William Francis Kenny Jr. in 1914 at Mercy Hospital in Philadelphia, Pennsylvania. Although Kenny was born in Philadelphia, he spent much of his young life in Baltimore, Maryland, with his twin brother Herb Kenny, who later on would also become a member of The Ink Spots. The boys' father, William Francis Kenny Sr., died of influenza in 1919 when the boys were five years old. That same year, their widowed mother, Jennie Kenny (1894–1958) moved the boys to Washington D.C and then to Baltimore, where the family attended St. Peter Claver Church and lived at 1151 Carey Street. Mrs. Kenny worked as a dressmaker and made drapery for department stores to support the boys. It was in the third grade that young Bill walked out on stage at his school, St. Peter's Parochial, to sing his first song in public. It was "The Japanese Sandman". Kenny demonstrated early on his high Tenor singing abilities, singing C over high C and participating in various school operettas at Booker T. Washington Junior High School and later at Douglass High School where he graduated. Here is an excerpt from a 1944 interview with the Baltimore Afro-American newspaper, where Kenny recalls singing as a young boy

'I've been singing since I was 7 and never had a voice lesson in my life. I was sitting in class one day, and I began singing. My teacher wanted to know who was singing and at first I was afraid to answer, but finally, I confessed. I was singing a full soprano then and unless you knew you would have thought a girl was singing. Anyhow, the teacher kept me after school, but instead of punishing me, he arranged for me to sing in the auditorium. My voice hasn't changed much yet,' he said. 'It's still rather high.' He made a few high notes for the AFRO. 'Well, that performance started me singing in earnest.' Although his voice has always been high, kids never teased him about it. 'They always kept quiet when I sang and seemed to enjoy it,' Kenny said. Kenny's speaking voice is quite low and husky.

It was in high school that Kenny began to focus on singing more than before and often appeared singing solo in his school assemblies. After graduation, Kenny attended an art school in Washington, D.C., but would on occasion, appear as a soloist in amateur contests in theaters throughout the metropolitan area of Washington, D.C. and in his hometown of Baltimore.

== Career ==
While Kenny was on vacation in Atlantic City, New Jersey, the young singer competed in 22 amateur night club contests, winning 21 of them. Bill Kenny's first professional booking was in Atlantic City, New Jersey, at the Ritz-Carlton Gardens. After Milton Berle's brother, Phil Berle, heard Kenny singing ballads, he signed him to a contract. Because jobs were too difficult to get in New York City, Berle decided to release Kenny from the contract after a short time. It was around this time that Kenny sang "Trees" in an amateur contest at the Savoy Ballroom in Harlem, and won first place, and a position singing with a group known as "The Ink Spots".

=== Influences and musical impact ===
In a 1992 interview, Kenny's twin brother Herb noted that singer Morton Downey had a tremendous influence on Bill and that Bill would often listen to Downey when he came home from school. It also is assumed that singer Orlando Roberson had influenced Kenny early on. Kenny has often been regarded as one of the most influential vocalists of the 20th Century. Singers such as Elvis Presley, Sam Cooke, Michael Bublé, Clyde McPhatter, Garland Jeffreys, Johnny Mathis, Tony Williams (The Platters), Del Shannon, Rudy West (The Five Keys), Sollie McElroy (The Flamingos), Jackie Wilson, Johnny Bragg (The Prisonaires), Nolan Strong and Prentice Moreland have all noted Bill Kenny as a major influence on their own singing. Elvis Presley frequently spoke of his admiration of Kenny and was once noted as saying that he could "honestly never hope to equal the musical achievements of Bill Kenny". In 1971 Presley recorded Kenny's composition "There Is No God But God". In the book "Group Harmony: The Black Urban Roots of Rhythm and Blues" by Stuart L. Goosman, Bill Kenny's immense influence on other vocal group singers is expressed in this excerpt:

Before the R&B era, before The Ravens, Orioles, and Clovers, young Black Males who wanted to sing wanted to be just like Bill Kenny and The Ink Spots. The group had the sound and they had the look. During the 1950s, Harold Winley sang bass for The Clovers and remembered the impact of The Ink Spots: "But during that time" he said, "you know, the groups that you would hear around on the corner singing were mostly singing Ink Spots. You hear cats going down the street, you know guys that had tenor voices man, in the morning, at night, singing Bill Kenny and doing the hands, like he used to do. It was either Bill Kenny or Billy Eckstine. Understand what I'm saying? Those were the voices you would hear."

Some of Kenny's favorite vocalists over the years included Ella Fitzgerald, Vic Damone, Lena Horne, Paul Robeson, John Gary, Roland Hayes and Nat King Cole.

=== The Ink Spots ===
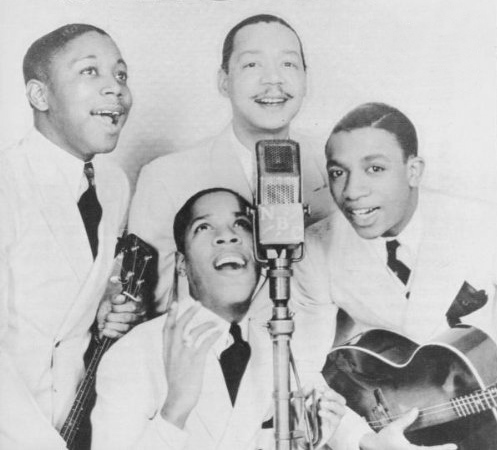
Bill Kenny (seated below microphone) with The Ink Spots

In 1936 The Ink Spots 1st Tenor Jerry Daniels left the group and was replaced by Bill Kenny. Kenny made his first recordings with The Ink Spots "It Ain't Nobody's Biz'ness What I Do" and the swing tune "Your Feet's Too Big" on May 12 of that year. Kenny had a brief solo on "Your Feet's Too Big". Kenny's first known solo feature came in February 1938 on a radio broadcast for radio station WEAF. The song was "Tune In On My Heart" from the 1929 Broadway musical "Remote Control", lyrics and music by Buddy Valentine and Gene Johnston. Kenny's first recorded solo feature to be recorded in a studio came in 1938 for Decca records on the ballad "I Wish You The Best Of Everything". In 1939 The Ink Spots were scheduled for a recording session at Decca recording studio in NYC. Songwriter Jack Lawrence brought with him his latest composition "If I Didn't Care" for The Ink Spots to record. Bill Kenny was featured throughout except for the middle "talking Bass" part done by Orville "Hoppy" Jones. Each member was paid only $37.50 for the recording, however, once the record sold 200,000 Decca destroyed the original contract and The Ink Spots were paid an additional $3,750. The record went on to sell more than 19 million copies and was Bill Kenny's first top hit feature. The year 1939 was the start of a new format for The Ink Spots that would feature Charlie Fuqua's trademark Guitar intro, Bill Kenny's Tenor lead, and Hoppy Jones "talking bass". Other Bill Kenny features such as "Address Unknown", "My Prayer", "Memories of You", "I'm Gettin' Sentimental Over You", and "Bless You (For Being An Angel)" all reach the top of the U.S Pop charts in 1939. It was around this time that The Ink Spots signed an additional five-year recording contract with Decca.

==== 1940s ====
From 1940 to 1949 Bill Kenny was featured lead singer on 40 of 45 Ink Spots recordings that reached the top of the U.S Pop charts. During the 1940s Kenny was featured in two major motion pictures: The Great American Broadcast (1941) and the Abbott and Costello film Pardon My Sarong (1942). In 1944 Ella Fitzgerald joined The Ink Spots at Decca studios where she and Kenny were to be featured on a song entitled "Into Each Life Some Rain Must Fall". That song reached #1 on the U.S Pop charts and #1 on the R&B charts. The flip side of that recording "I'm Making Believe" reached #1 on the U.S Pop charts and #2 on the R&B charts. In February 1945 Fitzgerald teamed up with The Ink Spots and was featured again with Kenny on a recording of "I'm Beginning To See The Light" and "That's The Way It Is". "I'm Beginning To See The Light" reached #5 on the U.S Pop charts. That same year, The Ink Spots manager Moe Gale, began trying to advertise the quartet as "The Ink Spots (Featuring Bill Kenny)" due to Kenny's increasing leadership role. In 1948 The Ink Spots featuring Bill Kenny appeared on the first-ever Ed Sullivan Television show. In 1949 Bill Kenny made his first solo recordings "Echoes" and "Land of Love" without The Ink Spots on Decca records. Although these were Kenny solo recordings, Decca decided to label them as "The Ink Spots". Kenny's recording of "Echoes" reached #24 on the U.S Pop charts.

==== 1950s ====
In 1950, Ella Fitzgerald teamed up once again with Bill Kenny & The Ink Spots and recorded "Little Small Town Girl" and "I Still Feel The Same About You". Both were duos with Fitzgerald and Kenny. Their previous collaborations were more like solo features than duets and didn't include as much harmonizing as these two recordings. In 1950, Kenny's solo recording of "If" reached #23 on the U.S Pop charts but, like his solo recordings from 1949 were labeled "The Ink Spots". In 1951 Bill Kenny recorded two more solo recordings "I'm Lucky I Have You" and "I Don't Stand a Ghost of a Chance with You" which featured cornetist Bobby Hackett. These were also solo recordings labeled as "The Ink Spots". This happened once more in October 1951 with Bill Kenny solo recordings "And Then I Prayed" and "Honest And Truly" on which he performs the "talking bass" part made famous by Orville "Hoppy" Jones. The last Ink Spots studio recordings were of the gospel composition "Somebody Bigger Than You And I" and the Blues number "Do Something For Me" both recorded in February 1951. In 1952 Charlie Fuqua, Baritone singer, Guitarist, and original member since 1934, decided to leave Bill Kenny to form his own Ink Spots group. It was decided by the court ruling that Fuqua would have to name his group "The 'New' Ink Spots". However, after a short time he dropped the "New", and thus two groups were using the name "The Ink Spots". This resulted in great conflict and confusion. However, Bill Kenny kept performing with The Ink Spots and started billing them as "Bill Kenny & His Ink Spots". A few live recordings and "radio checks" of Bill Kenny's Ink Spots from 1952/1953 survive today. After being with The Ink Spots for 18 years, Bill Kenny decided to leave the group for good in 1954, resulting in The Ink Spots disbanding.

=== Solo career ===
In 1951, Kenny started upon a solo career that would last until his death in 1978. From 1951 to 1952 all Decca recordings labeled "The Ink Spots" featured only the voice of Bill Kenny, therefore, making all Ink Spots recordings from '51 to '52 Bill Kenny solo recordings. From 1952 to 1953 Bill Kenny recorded 33 solos for Decca, some labeled as "The Ink Spots" and some as "Bill Kenny" or "Bill Kenny of The Ink Spots". Later on, Kenny recorded 14 sides for RCA's Vik label, four for the TEL label, two for the Warwick label, two for the AUB label, and two for RCA. These recordings featured arrangements by such prominent arrangers as Sy Oliver, Marty Gold, Leonard Joy, Morty Craft, Charles Shirley, and Leroy Kirkland.

==== Solo albums ====
In 1951, Kenny released his first album Precious Memories on the Decca label under the "Faith Series" and recorded four songs also on the "Faith Series" that were not included in the Precious Memories album. Kenny's recorded version of the Gospel composition "It Is No Secret" from the album Precious Memories, reached #18 on the US pop charts in 1951. In 1960 Kenny released his second album "Mr. Ink Spot" on the Warwick label. This album contained songs previously made famous by Bill Kenny and The Ink Spots as well as some standards such as "I Don't Know Why", "It Might As Well Be Spring", and "You'll Never Know". The Orchestrations on the album were arranged and conducted by Charles Shirley. In 1962 Kenny released an album on Mercury's subsidiary label Wing Records entitled Bill Kenny Sings The Golden Hits of the Ink Spots. This album featured such hits as "If I Didn't Care", "I Don't Want To Set The World On Fire", "I'll Get By", and "Do I Worry?". In 1966 Kenny recorded an album for DOT Records entitled Remember Me. The album contained songs featured on his CBC television program The Bill Kenny Show including "Me and My Shadow", "Danny Boy", "You're Nobody 'Till Somebody Loves You", "I Left My Heart in San Francisco", and "I'll Be Seeing You". In 1973 Kenny released his first album in seven years, With Love, for RCA Victor. This album featured songs composed by such songwriters as Irving Berlin, Lennon-McCartney, Kris Kristofferson, and George & Ira Gershwin. The album also features a version of Are You Lonesome Tonight which was released in 1973. The arrangements on this album were written by Doug Parker. 3 other albums, "Are You Lonesome Tonight?", "Bill Kenny Sings", and "The Ink Spots - If I Didn't Care" was recorded by Bill. "Are You Lonesome Tonight?" includes the same recordings as "With Love", and has an unknown release date. It might had been released in the late 1970s. "Bill Kenny Sings" included several new recordings, "No Summer Love", "Tomorrow Always Comes", and "Love Me Baby". All other recordings included in the album are from "With Love". Both Albums are assumed to be released in the coming years of his death, and most likely were released in 1977, one year before his death. "The Ink Spots - If I Didn't Care" was recorded in 1977, and released in 1979, and despite the name, it was a set of Bill Kenny recordings covering previously made Ink Spots' songs. It includes "Whispering Grass (Don't Tell The Trees), "Maybe", "The Gypsy", "To Each His Own", "I Don't Want To Set The World On Fire", "I'll Get By", "If I Didn't Care", "It's A Sin To Tell A Lie", "We Three (My Echo, My Shadow, and Me", and "When The Swallows Come Back To Capistrano".

==== Compositions ====
Throughout his life Kenny wrote and co-wrote many songs, including "There Is No God But God" (recorded by Elvis Presley), "When The Chimes Ring (At Evening)", "I Counted on You", "You Are Happiness", "A Soldiers Rosary", "I'm Heading Back To Paradise", "The Sweetest Dream", "Rose of Roses", "Don't Put It Off Til' Sunday", "Do You Feel That Way Too?", "Sorry You Said Goodbye", "My Lonesome Years", "Movita" and many more. Kenny's composition "I Can't Stand Losing You", which was written by Kenny in the early 1930s when he was in high school, was recorded by The Ink Spots for Decca Records in 1940. Although it was recorded in 1940, Decca decided to wait to release it until March 1943. Soon after its release, the song became a #1 hit on the R&B charts and was listed there for 7 weeks.

=== Television appearances ===
Throughout his career Kenny made dozens of television appearances both with The Ink Spots and as a solo act. In 1936 Kenny and The Ink Spots became the first African Americans to appear on Television. Kenny was later also featured with The Ink Spots on The Ed Sullivan Show multiple times. He also was featured with The Ink Spots on shows such as Songs for Sale three times, The Buick-Berle Show twice, Star of the Family, Wonderful Town, USA and more. Kenny was featured as a solo act on The Merv Griffin Show, The Steve Allen Plymouth Show, The Joey Bishop Show, The Robert Q. Lewis Show, The Jack Paar Tonight Show, The Generation Gap with Dennis Wholey, Flashback and four times as a solo on The Ed Sullivan Show. In 1966 CBC Television aired a musical variety show called The Bill Kenny Show. Kenny hosted as well as performed on the program. In the mid- to late 1960s Kenny hosted, emceed, and performed for a number of charity telethons in Canada.

== Personal life ==
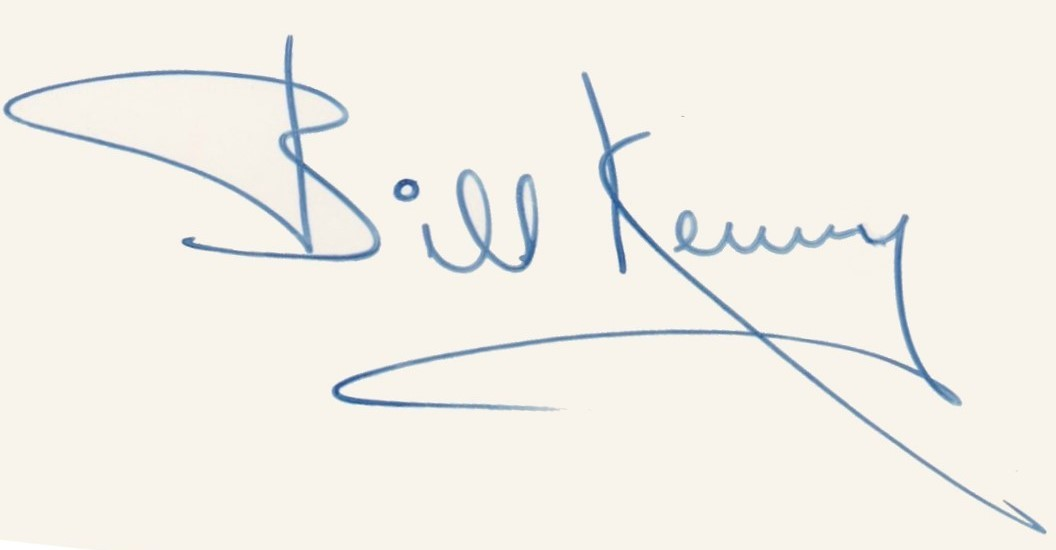
Signature.

Kenny was married three times. His first marriage was to Zena Boyd in 1937. His second marriage came in 1947 to Marguerite Wendell, a model from Chicago introduced to Kenny by heavyweight champion boxer Joe Louis. Kenny's relationship with Ms. Wendell ended in 1949 when Kenny learned that she had tricked him into marrying her by claiming that her unborn child was his. Kenny later found out that Ms. Wendell had adopted the child in a plan to acquire support money from him. He filed for divorce in 1949 and sued Ms. Wendell. Kenny's last marriage was to Audrey McBurney, a former model of Vancouver, British Columbia. The two were married in 1949 following McBurney's divorce from a man named Roy Norman Buchanan. Shortly after the Kenny-McBurney wedding, Buchanan charged that Kenny had lured away McBurney with gifts and promises of affection. Buchanan named Kenny as a co-respondent and asked for $50,000 "heart balm". The damage claim was dropped, however; and Kenny settled with Buchanan out of court for $1,300. Kenny first met McBurney after an Ink Spots performance in Vancouver at The Cave Supper Club where she was a member of the audience. Later on, Audrey became Bill's business manager. On July 4, 1969, Kenny was severely burnt when the gas tank of his sports car exploded in an underground parking garage in Vancouver as he lit a cigar while starting the vehicle; third-degree burns to his face and hands contributed to later respiratory problems, stemming from the fumes he inhaled. Kenny and McBurney remained married until Kenny's death in 1978. Although he never had any children of his own, Kenny became acting father of McBurney's daughter, Dixie Lee, from her marriage to Roy Buchanan.

Bill Kenny was tall, standing at six feet, three inches.

=== Activism and civil rights ===
Throughout his life, Kenny was known for his actions against racism and his involvement in his community. In 1945, in an interview with the Baltimore Afro-American newspaper, he expressed his dislike of James Eastland, Theodore G. Bilbo and "all of the rest of the whites who reside in the South and North for that matter, that thrive daily on discriminatory practices against my race". Kenny went on to say:

As a loyal American citizen, I believe in America, but I am a complete alien where democracy is concerned. To the white man while I am on the stage, I am Mr. Bill Kenny. But when I am on the streets and still wear my colored face, I am no higher nor lower than the scum of this earth so far as he is concerned. On the other hand, after he learns of me, he immediately thinks differently because he feels that I have money. I am now wondering what Gen. MacArthur can teach the Japs about democracy when MacArthur knows nothing of that which he expects to teach Japan. If the Americans set about to teach the kind of democracy practiced here in America, this entire world in time, will be full of low ideals because there can be no crime committed by man lower than that of taking away the rights of an individual or a people. The Americans have since the beginning robbed the colored man of his legitimate rights, and this is a low crime.

In 1949 Bill Kenny made headlines when he spoke out against racism and the "southern bugaboos of prejudice". Here is an excerpt from an article in the June 22, 1949, Miami Beach newspaper:

An event that will go down in radio history took place over station WGBS in Miami Beach recently, when Barry Gray, the vituperant disc jockey, invited Bill Kenny, leader of the Ink Spots, to be his guest on the station.

This invitation posed many problems that had to be solved before this appearance could materialize. Radio Station WGBS broadcasts right from the Copa City Club which is definitely prohibited area for any Negro. But the Ink Spots road manager, Murray Nadel, never one to be stumped by problems, called the police department and got a special police escort to take him and Bill Kenny to the radio show.

Barry Gray, long known for his fearless tactics in fighting the problems of a minority, immediately turned the interview into a forum seeking Bill Kenny's views on race prejudices in the South. The interview lasted for a half-hour and Kenny and Gray talked about nothing but the southern bugaboos of prejudice.

After the show went off the air both Barry and Bill sat around expecting the phone to ring violently all night long with many protests for what had just been discussed on the Southern air. But a great surprise was in store for both of them because the phone did ring many times but every call was from listeners who were very amiable and agreed with Kenny and Gray on their attitude on Southern prejudice.

It is a good sign for modern progress to realize that most of the Southerners, as individuals, agree wholeheartedly that all these unseen walls should be torn down and Negro talent should get its chance on Southern radio. The radio station, received over 3,000 calls after this precedent breaking broadcast and from all that number there was not one single complaint. An added sidelight worth noting is the fact that when Bill and his road manager left the radio studio they dismissed the police escort as there was no need for this "protection."

=== Charity work ===
In 1973, all of the proceeds from Bill Kenny's RCA album With Love and the proceeds from Kenny's book of poems Who Is He went to the establishment of a local foster home for needy children. Also in 1973, Kenny was awarded the Vancouver Interfaith Brotherhood award by Justice Angelo Branca, who said Kenny was "a man of outstanding human qualities". Throughout his career Kenny made appearances on numerous charity telethons particularly benefiting handicapped or homeless children.

== Death ==
Kenny died from a respiratory illness on March 23, 1978, in New Westminster, Canada. His funeral service was held at the Unitarian Church of Vancouver. Although there were tears from some in the congregation and from the nine eulogists, Mrs. Audrey Kenny asked that the service be kept cheerful. About 200 people – family, friends, and a few fans – were in attendance.

== Trivia ==
Kenny's voice has been featured in television shows such as The Walking Dead, The Simpsons, Fallout (TV series), The Visitor, The Singing Detective, Sanford, The Blacklist, Manhattan, Defiance, Arrested Development, The Wonder Years, Wayward Pines, Better Call Saul, Watchmen and more. Kenny's unusual high singing voice and impeccable diction was often imitated on television. The most famous example is that of Fred G. Sanford (played by comedian Redd Foxx) on the 1970s sitcom Sanford and Son. Foxx would often sing The Ink Spots hit "If I Didn't Care" while imitating Kenny's hand gestures and clear diction. In one episode ("Lamont As Othello"), Foxx sang "If I Didn't Care" but couldn't hit the last high note, at which point he remarked: "Ah! Bill Kenny used to hit that note."

Kenny's voice has been featured in such films as The Shawshank Redemption, Get Low, Radio Days, Raging Bull, Revolutionary Road, The Aviator, Iris, Sphere, Tree's Lounge, Malcolm X, Maria's Lovers, How to Make an American Quilt, Men Don't Leave, Twenty Bucks, Mr. Nobody, Hyde Park on Hudson and more. Kenny appeared as himself in Pardon My Sarong, and The Great American Broadcast.

Kenny's voice is featured in the video games Fallout, Fallout 3, Fallout 4, Fallout: New Vegas, L.A. Noire, BioShock and Mafia II.

== US Pop Hits on which Bill Kenny sang lead ==
Year	Single	Chart positions	
Year	Single	US	US R&B
1939	"If I Didn't Care"	2	—
1939	"Address Unknown"	1	—
1939	"My Prayer"	3	—
1939	"Bless You"	15	—
1939	"Memories of You"	29	—
1939	"I'm Gettin' Sentimental Over You"	26	—
1940	"When the Swallows Come Back to Capistrano"	4	—
1940	"Whispering Grass (Don't Tell the Trees)"	10	—
1940	"Maybe"	2	—
1940	"You're Breaking My Heart All Over Again"	17	—
1940	"We Three (My Echo, My Shadow and Me)"	1	—
1940	"My Greatest Mistake"	12	—
1941	"Please Take a Letter, Miss Brown"	25	—
1941	"Do I Worry?"	8	—
1941	"I'm Still Without a Sweetheart ('Cause I'm Still in Love With You)"	19	—
1941	"So Sorry"	24	—
1941	"Until the Real Thing Comes Along"	4	—
1941	"I Don't Want To Set the World on Fire"	4	—
1941	"Someone's Rocking My Dreamboat"	17	—
1942	"Ev'ry Night About This Time"	17	6
1942	"This Is Worth Fighting For"	—	9
1942	"Just As Though You Were Here"	—	10
1943	"If I Cared a Little Bit Less"	20	10
1943	"I'll Never Make the Same Mistake Again"	19	—
1943	"I Can't Stand Losing You"	—	1
1944	"Don't Believe Everything You Dream"	14	6
1944	"A Lovely Way to Spend an Evening"	2	—
1944	"I'll Get By (As Long as I Have You)"	7	4
1944	"Someday I'll Meet You Again"	14	—
1944	"I'm Making Believe" (Only Bill Kenny & Ella Fitzgerald)	1	2
1944	"Into Each Life Some Rain Must Fall" (with Ella Fitzgerald)	1	1
1945	"I'm Beginning to See the Light" (with Ella Fitzgerald)	5	—
1946	"The Gypsy"	1	1
1946	"Prisoner of Love"	9	5
1946	"To Each His Own"	1	3
1947	"You Can't See the Sun When You're Crying"	19	—
1947	"Ask Anyone Who Knows"	17	5
1948	"The Best Things in Life Are Free"	—	10
1948	"Say Something Sweet To Your Sweetheart" (Bill Kenny & Herb Kenny with mixed chorus)	22	—
1948	"You Were Only Fooling (While I Was Falling in Love)" (Bill Kenny & Herb Kenny w/ mixed chorus	8	15
1949	"You're Breaking My Heart" (Bill Kenny & Herb Kenny with orchestra)	9	—
1949	"Who Do You Know in Heaven (That Made You the Angel You Are?)" (Bill Kenny & Herb Kenny with orchestra)	21	—
1950	"Echoes" (Bill Kenny solo but labeled "Ink Spots)	24	—
1950	"Sometime"	26	—
1951	"If (They Made Me a King)" (Bill Kenny solo but labeled "Ink Spots")	23	—
1951	"It Is No Secret" (Bill Kenny solo)	18	—
1952	"(That's Just My Way of) Forgetting You" (Bill Kenny solo)	23	—
