= You're Breaking My Heart =

1948 popular song

Song
- Published: 1948
- Songwriters: Pat Genaro; Sunny Skylar; Ruggero Leoncavallo

"You're Breaking My Heart" is a popular song, which was first published in 1948. Though credited to Pat Genaro and Sunny Skylar, (with acknowledgements to the owners of the copyright in "Tis the Day") the song is an English version of the famous Italian song "Mattinata" written by Ruggero Leoncavallo at the beginning of the 20th century; that song had lapsed into the public domain in the United States by the time this English song was set to its tune.

== Popular recordings ==
Popular versions on the charts in 1949 included recordings by:

- The Vic Damone recording was released by Mercury Records as catalog number 5271. The flip side was "Four Winds and Seven Seas." The recording first entered the Billboard chart on June 10, 1949, lasting 26 weeks and peaking at position No. 1.
- The Ink Spots' recording featuring Bill Kenny (June 27, 1949) was released by Decca Records as catalog number 24693. The recording first entered the Billboard chart on August 12, 1949, lasting 14 weeks and peaking at position No. 9.
- The Buddy Clark recording was recorded on June 21, 1949, and released by Columbia Records as catalog number 38546. The recording first entered the Billboard chart on September 2, 1949, lasting 13 weeks and peaking at position No. 9.
- The Jan Garber recording was released by Capitol Records as catalog number 719 with "Now That I Need You" on the flip side. The recording first entered the Billboard chart on September 23, 1949, lasting two weeks and peaking at position No. 26.

== Other recordings ==
- The song was also recorded by Ralph Flanagan and his orchestra, with vocalist Harry Prime, on August 18, 1949, and released by the Bluebird Records subsidiary of RCA Victor Records as catalog number 30-0001.
- Keely Smith's remake made the British Top 20 in 1965.

== Popular culture ==
- Eddie Fisher also notably sang this song on a number of early 1950s television programs, often presided over by Eddie Cantor, and during a number of live performances, but never actually recorded it. However, several of those versions can be heard on music video platforms.
