= Huey Long (singer) =

American singer (1904–2009)

Background information
- Born: April 25, 1904; Sealy, Texas, U.S.
- Died: June 10, 2009 (aged 105) Houston, Texas, U.S.
- Genres: Jazz, swing, dixieland
- Occupations: Singer; musician; bandleader; arranger; music educator
- Instruments: Banjo, guitar, Vocals
- Years active: 1925–2009
- Labels: Victor, Decca
- Formerly of: The Ink Spots; Lil Armstrong; Fletcher Henderson; Frank Davis; The Ink Spots tribute groups

Huey Long (April 25, 1904 – June 10, 2009) was an American jazz and R&B guitarist and banjoist, singer and band leader, he also played piano and taught music, he was known for his stint as a member of the quartet The Ink Spots. Long's career began in the 1925 as a banjoist before moving to guitar. He became a member of the Ink Spots in 1945 and participated in spinoff bands in the 1960s.

== Career ==
Long was born as one of nine (four brothers and four sisters) to farmer Robert and Martha Long in Sealy, Texas, He began his musical career in 1925 playing banjo for Frank Davis' Louisiana Jazz Band Houston.

He switched from banjo to guitar after moving to Chicago, where he appeared at the 1933 World's Fair with Texas Guinan's Cuban Orchestra. He performed with artists such as Lil Armstrong and Fletcher Henderson, and his career also encompassed sideman, band leader, music arranger and music teacher.

He also played in Earl Hines big band with Dizzy Gillespie and Charlie Parker

In 1943, the Ink Spots's guitarist Charlie Fuqua was drafted and replaced by Bernie Mackey. When Mackey departed in 1945, leader Bill Kenny offered Long the position. Long stayed with the Ink Spots for nine months until October 1945 when Fuqua returned from the Army. Long moved to New York City, where he taught music. In the 1960s he joined Ink Spots tribute groups.

He retired to Houston, where his daughter set up a museum commemorating him and the Ink Spots. Long died in Houston, Texas at the age of 105 on June 10, 2009.
