= It Is No Secret =

Song by Stuart Hamblen
- Released: 1951
- Genre: Country
- Length: 2:51
- Label: Columbia
- Songwriter(s): Stuart Hamblen

"It Is No Secret" is a Southern gospel song written and sung by Stuart Hamblen and released on the Columbia label. In January 1951, it reached No. 8 on the country disc jockey chart. It spent two weeks on the charts and was the No. 30 best selling country record of 1951.

== Bill Kenny version ==
In 1951, The Ink Spots lead singer Bill Kenny recorded It Is No Secret for the Decca label. His recorded version which also featured "The Song Spinners" was the first to make the US pop charts, reaching number 18.

== Elvis Presley version ==
Elvis Presley recorded his version in Radio Recorders Studio 1, Hollywood, on January 19, 1957. It was released on Elvis' Christmas Album (RCA Victor LOC 1035) in November 1957. The producer was Steve Sholes. When heard by Paul McCartney, in early 1958, he took the chorus, as done for the first time by The Jordanaires, and included them in his first recording with the, then, The Quarrymen's, "In Spite of All the Danger", a song he feels was inspired, this time consciously, by another Presley song, "Tryin' to Get to You".

== See also ==
- Billboard Top Country & Western Records of 1951
