= Sweet and Low-Down =

1944 film by Archie Mayo

- Directed by: Archie Mayo
- Screenplay by: Richard English
- Story by: Richard English; Edward Haldeman
- Produced by: William LeBaron
- Starring: Benny Goodman; Linda Darnell; Jack Oakie
- Cinematography: Lucien Ballard
- Edited by: Dorothy Spencer
- Music by: Cyril J. Mockridge
- Distributed by: 20th Century Fox
- Release date: September 21, 1944
- Running time: 76 minutes
- Country: United States
- Language: English
- Box office: $1,250,000

Sweet and Low-Down is a 1944 musical film directed by Archie Mayo and starring Benny Goodman and Linda Darnell. The film was a fictionalized version of life with Goodman, his band, and their manager while entertaining at military camps. The song "I'm Making Believe" (lyrics by Mack Gordon; music by James V. Monaco) was nominated for an Academy Award.

== Plot ==
A young trombonist lets his newfound success go to his head when he is invited to join the Benny Goodman Orchestra.

== Cast ==
- Benny Goodman as Himself
- Linda Darnell as Trudy Wilson
- Jack Oakie as Popsy
- Lynn Bari as Pat Stirling
- James Cardwell as Johnny Birch
- Allyn Joslyn as Lester Barnes
- John Campbell as Dixie Zang
- Roy Benson as Skeets McCormick
- Dickie Moore as Military Cadet General 'Mogie' Carmichael

== Notes ==
Lynn Bari seems to have been typecast by Fox as a big band singer, playing the role in Sun Valley Serenade (1941) and Archie Mayo's Orchestra Wives (1942). Her voice had been dubbed in those films by Pat Friday, and in this film, she was dubbed by Lorraine Elliot.
