= The Bill Kenny Show =

- Genre: Music
- Presented by: Bill Kenny
- Country of origin: Canada
- Original language: English
- No. of seasons: 1

Production
- Producer: Elie Savoie
- Running time: 30 minutes

Original release
- Network: CBC Television
- Release: 22 May – 10 July 1966

The Bill Kenny Show is a Canadian music television program that aired on CBC Television in 1966.

== Premise ==
Bill Kenny, a member of the popular vocal quartet The Ink Spots in the 1930s, 1940s, and 1950s and later a solo singer, hosted this series. He became a Vancouver resident in 1961 and became among the first black performers to star in a nationally broadcast television series in Canada.

Series regulars included singing group The Accents, with Fraser MacPherson's house band. Visiting artists included Susan Pesklevits who was later known as Susan Jacks.

== Scheduling ==
This half-hour series was broadcast on Sundays at 3:00 p.m. (North American Eastern time) from May 22 to July 10, 1966.
