= A Lovely Way to Spend an Evening =

"A Lovely Way to Spend an Evening" is a popular song with music by Jimmy McHugh and lyrics by Harold Adamson, published in 1943. It was used in the film Higher and Higher (1944) when it was sung by Frank Sinatra. Sinatra and also The Ink Spots had chart hits with the song in 1944.

The song is considered a pop standard because it has been recorded by many artists.

== Recorded versions ==
- Ernestine Anderson
- Little Anthony & the Imperials
- Brook Benton
- Shirley Bassey
- Stanley Black
- Ann Burton
- Dick Cary
- Frank Chacksfield
- The Four Lads
- Curtis Fuller
- Hoʻokena
- Engelbert Humperdinck
- The Ink Spots feat. Bill Kenny
- Jack Jones
- Stan Kenton
- Richard Maltby, Sr.
- Mantovani
- Johnny Mathis
- Glenn Miller
- Audrey Morris
- Oscar Peterson
- Louis Prima
- Lou Rawls
- Raymond Scott
- Shocky
- Frank Sinatra
