= All by Myself (film) =

1943 film by Felix E. Feist

- Theatrical release poster
- Directed by: Felix E. Feist
- Screenplay by: Hugh Wedlock Jr. Howard Snyder
- Story by: Dorothy Bennett; Link Hannah
- Produced by: Bernard W. Burton
- Starring: Rosemary Lane; Evelyn Ankers; Patric Knowles; Neil Hamilton; Grant Mitchell; Louise Beavers
- Cinematography: Paul Ivano
- Edited by: Charles Maynard
- Production company: Universal Pictures
- Distributed by: Universal Pictures
- Release date: June 11, 1943
- Running time: 63 minutes
- Country: United States
- Language: English

All by Myself is a 1943 American comedy film directed by Felix E. Feist and written by Hugh Wedlock Jr. and Howard Snyder. The film stars Rosemary Lane, Evelyn Ankers, Patric Knowles, Neil Hamilton, Grant Mitchell and Louise Beavers. The film was released on June 11, 1943, by Universal Pictures.

== Cast ==
- Rosemary Lane as Val Stevenson
- Evelyn Ankers as Jean Wells
- Patric Knowles as Dr. Bill Perry
- Neil Hamilton as Mark Turner
- Grant Mitchell as J.D. Gibbons
- Louise Beavers as Willie
- Sarah Edwards as Mrs. Vincent
- Tip, Tap and Toe
  - Samuel Green as Tip
  - Ted Fraser as Tap
  - Ray Winfield as Toe
