= Bobby Worth =

American songwriter (1912–2002)

Bobby Worth (September 25, 1912, in Cleveland, Ohio – July 17, 2002, in Mission Hills, California) was an American songwriter. His best known songs are "Do I Worry?", "'Til Reveille", "Tonight We Love", and "Don't You Know?".

Worth was considered a child prodigy, performing in classical concerts at ten years of age. In his teens, he performed in Gus Edwards' vaudeville acts. In 1940, at age 28, he moved to Hollywood, California, and teamed with songwriter Stanley Cowan in 1941 to begin writing for movie studios.

From the 1940s onward, songs by Worth were recorded by prominent artists including Bing Crosby, Frank Sinatra, and Ella Fitzgerald. In collaboration with bandleader Freddy Martin and Ray Austin, he composed the song "Tonight We Love". He also co-composed the popular 1941 World War II tune, "(Lights Out) 'Til Reveille".

== Songs in films ==
Films to which Worth contributed songs include:

- 1939 Sunset Trail
- 1942 Pardon My Sarong
- 1943 Honeymoon Lodge
- 1944 In Society
- 1946 Blue Bayou
- 1946 Make Mine Music
- 1947 Fun and Fancy Free
- 1948 Melody Time
- 1949 An Old-Fashioned Girl

Worth acted in the 1945 film, Penthouse Rhythm.
