= Into Each Life Some Rain Must Fall =

1944 song

"Into Each Life Some Rain Must Fall" is a 1944 song performed as a duet by The Ink Spots, featuring Bill Kenny, and Ella Fitzgerald. Their recording was made on August 30, 1944 for Decca Records (catalog No. 23356B). The song was written by Allan Roberts (lyrics) and Doris Fisher (melody). The name of the song originates from a quotation of Henry Wadsworth Longfellow from the poem "Rainy Day". The song has also been included in the soundtrack for several video games.

== Chart performance ==
The successful single went to number one on both The Harlem Hit Parade and the pop chart. The B-side of the single entitled, "I'm Making Believe" also became a popular hit on both charts.

== Cover versions ==
- Teresa Brewer – her single for Coral Records charted briefly in 1953, peaking at No. 23.
- Frankie Avalon – included on the album The Young Frankie Avalon (1959).
- Kay Starr – Losers, Weepers (1960).
- Ella Fitzgerald – on the album Ella and Basie! (1963)
- Cliff Richard & The Shadows – on the soundtrack album for the 1965 film Finders Keepers. Released on Columbia Records (Columbia SCX 6079).
- Dianne Reeves included her version of the song for her Good Night, and Good Luck album (2005)

Smokey Robinson Warm Thoughts Album Released on Tamla Records (1980) "Into Each Rain Some Life Must Fall" (Doris Fisher, Allan Roberts) - 4:34

== In popular culture ==
- The version by The Ink Spots and Ella Fitzgerald was used in the BBC series The Singing Detective (1986).
- The song was used in the 2001 'Transport' commercial of Dutch insurance company Centraal Beheer.
