= When the Swallows Come Back to Capistrano =

Song written by Leon René

Single by The Ink Spots
- B-side: "What Can I Do"
- Released: May 1940
- Recorded: May 13, 1940
- Genre: Traditional Pop
- Length: 3:00
- Label: Decca Records

The Ink Spots singles chronology
"I'm Gettin' Sentimental Over You" (1940)	"When the Swallows Come Back to Capistrano" (1940)	"Whispering Grass" (1940)

"When the Swallows Come Back to Capistrano" is a song written by Leon René and first recorded by The Ink Spots featuring Bill Kenny in May 1940. The Ink Spots' recording of the song reached No. 4 on the US charts.

== Background ==
René wrote the song as a tribute to the annual springtime return of the cliff swallows to Mission San Juan Capistrano in Southern California. A glassed-off room in the mission was later designated in René's honor, and displays the upright piano on which he composed the tune, the reception desk from his office, several copies of the song's sheet music and other pieces of furniture, all donated by René's family.

== Other 1940 recordings ==
- Also in 1940, a recording by Glenn Miller reached No. 2 the same year.
- Other recordings were made at about the same time by Xavier Cugat and Gene Krupa.

== Later recordings ==
The song was later recorded by among many others including: Fred Waring, Guy Lombardo, Billy May and Pat Boone (on the B-side of April Love).
