= Echoes (1950 song) =

1950 song by Bennie Benjamin and George David Weiss

Song
- Written: Bennie Benjamin; George David Weiss
- Published: 1950
- Genre: Popular

"Echoes" is a popular song. It was written by Bennie Benjamin and George David Weiss, and published in 1950.

It was first recorded in 1950 by The Ink Spots whose recording reached number 24 on the US pop chart. In 1950, Jo Stafford and Gordon MacRae also recorded the composition. That version, released by Capitol Records as catalog number 782, was backed with "Bibbidi-Bobbidi-Boo (The Magic Song)" on the B-side. The song reached number 18 on the Billboard chart and number 13 on the Cash Box chart.

Sammy Kaye with vocal refrain by The Kaydets, recorded in New York City on October 7, 1949. It was released by RCA Victor Records as catalog number 20-3595 (in US) and by EMI on the His Master's Voice label as catalog number JO 170.
