= Clearside =

American electronic musician

- Born: Bryan Dych; October 29; Detroit, MIchigan, United States
- Origin: Los Angeles, California, United States
- Occupations: Musician; Songwriter
- Instrument(s): Synthesizer, multi-instrumentalist
- Years active: 2012–present
- Labels: Indie
- Website: www.clearsidemusic.com

Clearside (born Bryan Dych), is an American electronic musician. Known for blending aggressive analog synthesizers with downtempo drum breaks, the music often results a futuristic soundscape while paying homage to 90s big beat electronic. In addition to working as a solo artist; he is a ghostwriter often writing music for various TV, motion picture, video game and trailer projects.

== History ==
Born and raised in the suburbs of Detroit, Michigan, he began creating electronic music at the age of 13. After completion of high school, he moved to Tempe Arizona to pursue music production and engineering. Shortly after he relocated to Los Angeles and worked as a studio intern while freelancing as mixing engineer. In 2006 he took a job as a post-production supervisor for several years before leaving to focus on his project, Clearside.

Clearside self-released his first EP in July 2012. It was recorded at his home studio consisting of ProTools, Alesis Andromeda, and Moog Little Phatty. The EP often features groove metal style guitar riffs and overdriven Moog bass. Although the debut EP flew mainly under the mainstream radar despite having been featured multiple times on various MTV shows including Jersey Shore. "Virus" was also included in a user voted "Best of Radio Reddit 2012" album compilation.

In February 2013, Clearside released his second album "Shape_Shifted" that consisted all remixes from the 2012 EP "Clearside." Avant-garde electronic artist Post Riot Era remixed 5 songs from the "Clearside EP" into a complete 9 track album. The album was a brutal onslaught of heavily distorted mixes and aural ambient soundscapes. The song "Gone" which is a reimagined version of the track "My Mind Is Going" was featured in the 2014 trailer for David Michôd's "The Rover."

In December 2013, "Light Vision" was released. A 5 song EP consisting of slower, darker and more electronic style. Often touching on IDM influences, Light Vision marks a departure from the industrial guitar driven sound that was a large part of the sound of the first two albums. Leigh Jones was featured on the first single "Pulse."

The first single from the 2018 album Hologram Companion; "Cop Drama" premiered with a feature on HBO's Silicon Valley on May 21, 2017.

"Cop Drama" was featured again at the end credits of "Chief Operating Officer" episode 3 of season 5 on April 8, 2018.

"WAR" feat. T-Moe was featured in the Mortal Kombat 11 story trailer on March 6, 2019.
