= Bless You for Being an Angel =

Song
- Published: 1939
- Genre: pop
- Composers: Eddie Lane and Don Baker

"Bless You for Being an Angel," also written "Bless You (For Being an Angel)" or called "Bless You," is a 1939 popular song written by Eddie Lane and Don Baker.

== Song history ==
The song was first released by The Ink Spots in 1939.

== Brendan Bowyer version ==
A cover version was released by Irish singer Brendan Bowyer in 1964 on the His Master's Voice label, and reached number one in the Irish Singles Chart for two weeks. "California Sun" was the B-side, misspelled as "Californian Sun" on the record.
