= If I Didn't Care =

1939 popular song

Single by the Ink Spots
- B-side: "Knock Kneed Sal (On The Mourner's Bench)"
- Released: 1939
- Recorded: January 12, 1939
- Length: 3:09
- Label: Decca
- Songwriter: Jack Lawrence

The Ink Spots singles chronology
"My Prayer" (1939)	"If I Didn't Care" (1939)	"It's Funny to Everyone But Me" (1939)

"If I Didn't Care"

Single by Connie Francis
- B-side: "Toward The End Of The Day"
- Released: 1959
- Recorded: 1958
- Genre: Pop
- Length: 2:38
- Label: MGM
- Songwriter: Jack Lawrence

Connie Francis singles chronology
"My Happiness" (1958)	"If I Didn't Care" (1959)	"Lipstick on Your Collar" (1959)

"If I Didn't Care" is a song written by Jack Lawrence that was sung and recorded by the Ink Spots featuring Bill Kenny in 1939.

== Background ==
The Ink Spots recording became the 10th best selling single of all time with over 19 million copies sold making it one of the fewer than forty all-time singles to have sold 10 million (or more) physical copies worldwide. According to Lawrence, he mailed the song before showing it to some of his friends. His friends' reaction to the song was almost unanimously negative, but he remained positive on it and later it became one of his biggest successes.

== History ==
The cultural impact of If I Didn't Care includes:

- Its addition to the Grammy Hall of Fame
- No. 271 on the Songs of the Century list
- A background track in the 2007 video game BioShock.
- The Ink Spots' recording selected in 2018 for preservation in the National Recording Registry by the Library of Congress
- Featured in the first series of The Tourist (TV Series)
- Inclusion in the soundtracks of films and television:
  - Sanford And Son (1974)
  - Blade Runner (1982)
  - Radio Days (1987)
  - Men Don't Leave (1990)
  - The Shawshank Redemption (1994)
  - Miss Pettigrew Lives for a Day (2008) (performed by actors Amy Adams and Lee Pace)
  - Get Low (2009)
  - Hyde Park on Hudson (2012)
  - South Park (2025)
  - Digger (2026)

Other recordings of If I Didn't Care include:

- A No. 17 hit in 1954 by the Hilltoppers
- A No. 22 hit in 1959 by Connie Francis In Canada it reached No. 16. This was also her lowest charting song that she remade in her 1989 album, Where the Hits Are.
- A No. 30 hit in 1961 by the Platters No. 28 in Canada.
- A No. 44 hit on the Billboard Hot 100 in 1970 by The Moments (later known as Ray, Goodman & Brown) and a No. 7 on the Best Selling Soul Singles chart.
- A No. 9 hit on the UK singles chart in 1974 by David Cassidy
- Addition to their 1999 album Wonderful by ska-pop band Madness.

== Charts ==
Weekly chart performance of "If I Didn't Care" for diverse artists
Year	Artist	Chart	Peak position
1954	Hilltoppers	US Billboard Hot 100	17
1959	Connie Francis		
1959	Connie Francis	US Billboard Hot 100	22
1959	Connie Francis	US Cashbox Top 100 Singles	15
1959	Connie Francis	US Music Vendor (Record World)	9
1959	Connie Francis	US Hot R&B/Hip-Hop Songs (Billboard)	29
1959	Connie Francis	AUS Kent Music Report	85
1959	Connie Francis	CAN CHUM Chart	16
1961	The Platters		
1961	The Platters	US Billboard Hot 100	30
1961	The Platters	CAN CHUM Chart	28
1970	The Moments		
1970	The Moments	US Billboard Hot 100	44
1970	The Moments	US Hot R&B/Hip-Hop Songs (Billboard) then called Hot Rhythm & Blues Singles	7
1974	David Cassidy		
1974	David Cassidy	UK Singles (Official Charts)	9
