= Pardon My Sarong =

1942 film by Erle C. Kenton

- Film poster
- Directed by: Erle C. Kenton
- Written by: True Boardman; Nat Perrin; John Grant
- Produced by: Mayfair Productions; Alex Gottlieb; Jules Levey
- Starring: Bud Abbott; Lou Costello; Virginia Bruce; Robert Paige; Lionel Atwill
- Cinematography: Milton R. Krasner
- Edited by: Arthur Hilton
- Music by: Charles Previn
- Production company: Universal Pictures
- Distributed by: Universal Pictures
- Release date: August 7, 1942
- Running time: 84 minutes
- Language: English
- Budget: $400,000
- Box office: $2.2 million (US rentals)

Pardon My Sarong is a 1942 American comedy film directed by Erle C. Kenton and starring Abbott and Costello. The cast also featured Virginia Bruce, Robert Paige and Lionel Atwill. It was produced and distributed by Universal Pictures as part of a long-running series featuring the comic duo.

== Plot ==
Tommy Layton, a wealthy bachelor, rents a city bus to take him from Chicago to Los Angeles to participate in a yacht race to Hawai’i. The bus drivers, Algy and Wellington, are pursued by a detective hired by the bus company. They escape capture by driving the bus off a fishing pier. Layton, who is now on his yacht, rescues them and hires them to be his crew for the race. A competitor of his in the race, Joan Marshall has fired his original crew without his knowledge. He enacts revenge by kidnapping her and taking her along on the race.

While on course to Hawai’i, they encounter a typhoon and land on an uncharted island, which is also the home of Dr. Varnoff, a mysterious archaeologist. The island natives mistake Wellington as a legendary hero and inform him that he must marry Princess Luana. Meanwhile, Varnoff plans to make a volcano appear to erupt in order to trick the tribe into offering him their invaluable sacred jewel. The natives send Wellington (and the jewel) to the volcano to defeat the evil spirit of the volcano. Varnoff chases him to the volcano, where they are defeated by Wellington and Algy.

== Cast ==
- Bud Abbott as Algy Shaw
- Lou Costello as Wellington Pflug
- Virginia Bruce as Joan Marshall
- Robert Paige as Tommy Layton
- Lionel Atwill as Varnoff
- Leif Erickson as Whaba
- Nan Wynn as Luana
- William Demarest as Det. Kendall
- Samuel S. Hinds as Chief Kolua
- Marie McDonald as Ferna
- Elaine Morey as Amo
- Tip, Tap and Toe

== Production ==
Pardon My Sarong was filmed at Universal Studios from March 2 through April 28, 1942. The film's original draft, dated July 19, 1941, was titled Road to Montezuma.

The Ink Spots performed in this movie and were portrayed as waiters. "Do I Worry?" was a feature for lead tenor Bill Kenny and 2nd tenor Deek Watson was featured on "Shout Brother Shout" singing the lead part and playing trumpet. The famous dance group Tip, Tap and Toe danced during the nightclub scene.

The film contains a famous burlesque routine, "The Tree Of Truth". If you tell a lie while standing under a certain tree, something terrible will happen to you. Costello is skulled by a coconut with every lie he tells, and at the end he is neck-deep in coconuts.

== World premiere ==
The film premiered in Costello's hometown of Paterson, New Jersey at a benefit for St. Anthony's Church.

== Box-office ==
This film was Universal's number two grosser of 1942, bringing in $2.2 million according to Variety.

== Home media ==
This film has been released twice on DVD. The first time, on The Best of Abbott and Costello Volume One, on February 10, 2004, and again on October 28, 2008, as part of Abbott and Costello: The Complete Universal Pictures Collection.
