= I Don't Want to Set the World on Fire =

Pop song written in 1938

Song
- Written: 1938
- Genre: Pop
- Songwriters: Bennie Benjamin; Eddie Durham; Sol Marcus; Eddie Seiler

"I Don't Want to Set the World on Fire" is a pop song written by Bennie Benjamin, Eddie Durham, Sol Marcus, and Eddie Seiler.

The song was written in 1938, and first recorded three years later by Harlan Leonard and His Rockets. It was covered by several musicians and groups, most successfully by Horace Heidt on Columbia Records, whose version reached number one on the US pop chart; and by The Ink Spots on Decca in 1941, whose version reached number four on the same listing. Other early versions included those by Tommy Tucker, Mitchell Ayres, and (in Britain) Vera Lynn. The song, with its open line "I don't want to set the world on fire / I just want to start a flame in your heart..." became especially popular after the attack on Pearl Harbor in December 1941.

The song was later recorded by Betty Carter, Frankie Laine, Brian Hyland, Anthony Newley, Suzy Bogguss, the Muppets and others.

== Samples ==
This song was quietly sampled by thrash metal band Megadeth on their song "Set the World Afire" on their 1988 studio album So Far, So Good... So What!

The song was also sampled by Joji (musician) in his song "Asian Pizza" on his PG3* album.

== The Ink Spots cover ==
"I Don't Want to Set the World on Fire"

Song by the Ink Spots
- B-side: "Hey Doc!"
- Released: September 1941
- Recorded: August 27, 1941
- Length: 3:07
- Label: Decca

The Ink Spots' 1941 version has been featured in numerous media.

The cover has been prominently featured in the Fallout media franchise. It can be heard in the Bethesda Softworks video games Fallout 3, Fallout 4, and Fallout 76 on the in-game radio. The cover was also used in the trailer and second episode of the first season of the 2024 television show Fallout. The cover can also be heard in season 5 of ABC’s Once Upon a Time. In 2026, the cover was featured in the film Digger.
