= It's a Sin to Tell a Lie =

Single by Somethin' Smith and the Redheads
- B-side: "My Baby Just Cares for Me"
- Released: January 31, 1955
- Recorded: 1954
- Genre: Traditional pop
- Length: 3:01
- Label: Epic
- Songwriter: Billy Mayhew

Somethin' Smith and the Redheads singles chronology
"Gee" (1954)	"It's a Sin to Tell a Lie" (1955)	"The Ace in the Hole" (1955)

"It's a Sin to Tell a Lie" is a 1936 popular song written by Billy Mayhew, introduced early that year on records by many dance bands including Dick Robertson on the 78 rpm record Champion 40106, and later popularized by Fats Waller on Victor 25342 and re-issued on Victor 20-1595. It was recorded in French by Cajun singer Cléoma Breaux in 1936 or 1937. Four further recordings of the song were made in 1936, namely by Freddy Ellis and His Orchestra (April), Victor Young and His Orchestra (April), Elton Britt (September), Roy Smeck and His Serenaders and Vera Lynn. It was also recorded by singer Ruth Etting that same year.

== Later versions ==
As of 2019, in all there are 95 versions, including:

- The tune was revived in 1955 by Somethin' Smith and the Redheads, reaching number 7 on the Billboard charts in that year.
- It was later a Top 40 country hit for Slim Whitman, reaching #21 on the 'Top Country Singles' chart in 1971, from the album of the same name.
- John Denver tells a story about the song and does a cover in his 1978 album, Live at the Sydney Opera House (RCA Victor VPL1-7167).
- Gerry Monroe (a #13 hit in the UK Singles Chart as well as a #3 hit in the Australian Singles Chart, both in 1971)
- Billie Holiday
- The Ink Spots
- Brent Spiner
- Floyd Vivino
- Tony Bennett (US #99 in 1964)
- Bobbi Martin
- Lenny Breau
- Buddy Greco
- Steve Goodman
- The Quebe Sisters Band
- Ann Breen
- Jerry Murad and the Harmonicats
- Bobby Vinton
- Patti Page
- Vera Lynn
- George Maharis
- Naomi Akimoto
- Asylum Street Spankers

== Later uses ==
- Originally a waltz, during the British Dixieland revival in the 1950s and 1960s this melody was often played in fast 4/4 time, notably recorded by the Kenny Ball Band.
- In the 2010 role-playing game Fallout: New Vegas, The Ink Spots rendition of the song can be heard on the in-game radio.
- A private recording exists of Elvis Presley singing part of the song over an orchestral recording by Nelson Riddle.
- In season 2, episode 4 of the New Zealand TV series Seven Periods With Mr Gormsby, "Dancing with the Staff", the titular character performs a version of the song at the school dance.
