= Java Jive =

Single by The Ink Spots
- Written: 1940
- Released: 1940
- Genre: Rhythm and blues
- Songwriters: Ben Oakland, Milton Drake

The Ink Spots singles chronology
"My Greatest Mistake" (1940)	"Java Jive" (1940)	"Please Take a Letter, Miss Brown" (1941)

Java Jive is a song written by Ben Oakland and Milton Drake in 1940 and most famously recorded that year by The Ink Spots, whose recording reached #17 on the U.S. Pop charts and is considered by many to be the definitive version. The song is also heard in the 1942 movie In This Our Life.

The lyrics speak of the singer's love for coffee and tea, and also reflect the slang of that time, including a reference to "Mr. Moto", a Japanese film spy. The song originally featured the couplet "I'm not keen about a bean / Unless it is a 'cheery beery bean", as a pun on the song "Ciribiribin", but the Ink Spots' lead singer, Deek Watson, inadvertently sang it as "cheery cheery bean", and recordings by subsequent artists have generally either followed suit or changed it to "chili chili bean".

The Manhattan Transfer performed the song on various occasions, including during their appearances on Camera Three (1974), The Mike Douglas Show (1974), and The Two Ronnies (1978), and the band recorded it for inclusion on their 1975 self-titled album.

The song has been recorded several times over the years, notably by Guy Lombardo, The King Sisters, and Bluegrass Student Union.
