= Maybe (Allan Flynn and Frank Madden song) =

Single by The Ink Spots
- B-side: "Whispering Grass"
- Released: June 1940
- Label: Decca Records
- Songwriter(s): Allan Flynn, Frank Madden

"Maybe" is a pop song written by Allan Flynn and Frank Madden that was published in 1940.

== Recordings in 1940 ==
The first version to chart was recorded on June 11, 1940, by the Ink Spots featuring Bill Kenny and released by Decca Records as catalog number 3258, with the A-side "Whispering Grass". The recording reached number 2 on the chart that year.

Another charting version was recorded by Dinah Shore on June 25, 1940, and released by Bluebird Records as catalog number 10793, with the flip side "The Nearness of You". This version reached number 17 on the charts.

Bobby Byrne and his orchestra also charted with the song that year, reaching number 19. His version was recorded on July 19, 1940, with a vocal by Jimmy Palmer, and released by Decca as catalog number 3392A. The flip side was "One Look at You".

== 1952 revival ==
The song was revived as a duet by Perry Como and Eddie Fisher, recorded on May 13, 1952, which was released by RCA Victor Records, with the flip side "Watermelon Weather," as a 78 rpm single (catalog number 20-4744) and a 45 rpm single (catalog number 47-4744) in the United States reaching number 3 on the charts in 52. This recording with the same flip side was also issued by His Master's Voice in the United Kingdom as a 78 rpm single, catalog number B-10289.

== In popular culture ==
The Ink Spots' version of the song was also used as the opening and closing theme for the first game of the Fallout franchise. The game's sequels, Fallout 3, 4 and 76, also use this song on their in-game radios. Fallout (American TV series) also features it as the credit song and in the show itself.
