= We Three (My Echo, My Shadow and Me) =

Single by Frank Sinatra and the Tommy Dorsey Orchestra
- B-side: "Tell Me at Midnight"
- Released: 1940
- Label: RCA Victor
- Songwriters: Nelson Cogane, Sammy Mysels and Dick Robertson

Frank Sinatra and the Tommy Dorsey Orchestra singles chronology
"Looking for Yesterday" (1940)	"We Three (My Echo, My Shadow and Me)" (1940)	"You're Breaking My Heart All Over Again" (1940)

"We Three (My Echo, My Shadow and Me)" is a ballad published in 1939 by Nelson Cogane (né Nelson Cogane Fonarow; 1902–1985), Sammy Mysels and Dick Robertson. It was a hit song in 1940 for both The Ink Spots, recorded in July 1940 and released on Decca in October, (b/w "My Greatest Mistake"), and Frank Sinatra with the Tommy Dorsey Orchestra, recorded on August 29 and issued on RCA Victor, backed with "Tell Me at Midnight". Both versions reached No. 3 in Billboard in December.

The song's lyrics describe a man who walks alone in the moonlight, accompanied only by his echo and his shadow, pining for his love, for whom he will wait until eternity.

== Other recordings ==
- Dolores O'Neill recorded "We Three" with the Bob Chester Orchestra on 14 August 1940 in New York City
- Ella Fitzgerald, who would later record with The Ink Spots, also recorded the song for Decca in 1940; it is included on the 2003 CD compilation Jukebox Ella: The Complete Verve Singles, Vol. 1.

== Cover versions ==
- Brenda Lee recorded "We Three" for her 1960 Decca album This Is...Brenda.
