= The Ink Spots =

American pop vocal band (1934–1954)

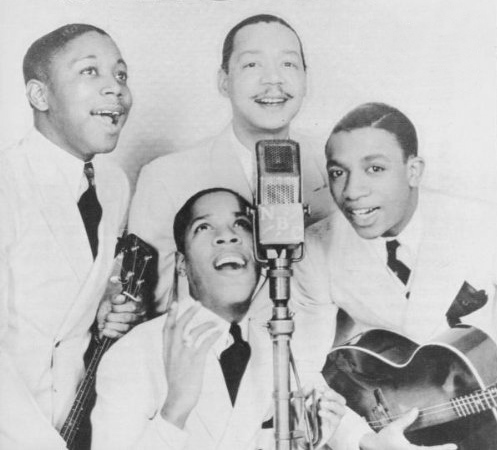
- The Four Ink Spots c. 1937 (From L to R: Deek Watson, Bill Kenny (seated), Hoppy Jones, and Charlie Fuqua

Background information
- Origin: Indianapolis, Indiana, U.S.
- Genres: Pop; vocal harmony; easy listening; swing
- Years active: 1934–1954
- Labels: Victor; Decca
- Website: inkspots.com

The Ink Spots were an American vocal pop group who gained international fame in the 1930s and 1940s. Their unique musical style predated the rhythm and blues and rock and roll musical genres, and the subgenre doo-wop. The Ink Spots were widely accepted in both the white and black communities, largely due to the ballad style introduced to the group by lead singer Bill Kenny.

In 1989, the Ink Spots (Bill Kenny, Charlie Fuqua, Deek Watson, Jerry Daniels, and Orville Jones) were inducted into the Rock and Roll Hall of Fame, and in 1999 they were inducted into the Vocal Group Hall of Fame. Since the Ink Spots disbanded in 1954, there have been well over a hundred vocal groups calling themselves "The Ink Spots", with and without any original members of the group. It has often been the case that these groups claimed to be "second generation" or "third generation" Ink Spots.

== 1930s ==
=== Early background of founding members ===
Daniels and Fuqua formed a vocal duo called "Jerry and Charlie" and performed in the Indianapolis area around 1931. About the same time, Jones and Watson were part of a quartet, "The Four Riff Brothers" with Mifflin James "Miff" Campbell and Elmer Oliver aka Slim Green, who appeared regularly on radio station WLW in Cincinnati, Ohio. In 1933, that group disbanded, and Watson, Daniels and Fuqua got together to form a new vocal, instrumental, and comedy group initially called "King, Jack, and Jester". They continued to appear regularly on radio in Ohio and became a quartet when Jones joined the following year.

In July 1934, they accepted a booking at the Apollo Theater, New York, supporting jazz bandleader Tiny Bradshaw. At this point they had changed their name to "The 4 Ink Spots". Later that year, the Ink Spots achieved international success touring the UK with Jack Hylton's Orchestra, one review in the Melody Maker stating:

The sensation of the programme is the coloured quartette, the Four Ink Spots. They sing in a style something between the Mills Brothers and the Three Keys and accompany themselves on three tenor guitars and a cello—which is not bowed, but picked and slapped like a double bass. Their natural instinct for hot rhythm is exemplified in their terrific single-string solo work and their beautifully balanced and exquisitely phrased vocalisms. They exploit all kinds of rhythmic vocalisms—straight solos, concerted, scat, and instrumental imitations. They even throw in a bit of dancing to conclude their act, and the leading guitarist simultaneously plays and juggles with his instrument.

They first recorded for Victor Records in 1935. Their early recordings included such songs as "Swingin' on the Strings", "Your Feet's Too Big", "Don't 'Low No Swingin' in Here" and "Swing, Gate, Swing". Despite their rising popularity as performers, their early records were not commercially successful.

=== Bill Kenny joins ===
In 1936, Daniels was replaced by a 21-year-old singer from Baltimore, Bill Kenny, who signed on with the Ink Spots after winning first place in an amateur contest at Harlem's Savoy Ballroom. Three years later, Kenny was credited for bringing the group to global success with his unusually high tenor ballad singing.

In 1938, after being in the group for two years, Kenny started to introduce the group to a new format that he called "Top & Bottom". This format was used primarily for ballads rather than the uptempo "jive" songs the group was used to performing. This format called for the tenor (Kenny or Watson) to sing the lead for one chorus followed by a chorus performed by bass singer Jones reciting the lyrics rather than singing them. After a chorus of the "talking bass" the lead tenor sang the rest of the song until the end. The earliest example of their "Top & Bottom" format is from a radio broadcast from 1938. The song, titled "Tune In on My Heart", features Kenny taking the lead and Jones performing the talking bass.

Also in 1938, Kenny took his first feature solo in Decca studios. His feature was on a song titled "I Wish You the Best of Everything". Although not in the "Top & Bottom" format, it was a ballad and used the signature Ink Spots guitar intro. Even though it got a good response, it was not very successful in terms of record sales and did not reach the pop chart.

=== "If I Didn't Care" and the late 1930s ===
On January 12, 1939, the Ink Spots entered Decca studios to record a ballad written by a young songwriter named Jack Lawrence. This ballad, "If I Didn't Care", was to be one of their biggest hits, selling more than 19 million copies and becoming the 8th-best-selling single of all time. This is the first studio recorded example of the Ink Spots "Top & Bottom" format with Kenny singing lead and Jones performing the "talking bass". For this recording, each member was paid $37.50; after the record sold 200,000 copies, however, Decca destroyed the original contract and the group was paid an additional $3,750. This was the recording that brought the group to global fame and established the "Top & Bottom" format as the Ink Spots "trademark". From 1939 until the group's disbanding in 1954, many of their songs employed this format. The year 1939 also saw the Ink Spots enjoy commercial success with five other recordings that featured Kenny in the "Top & Bottom" format. Their most successful hit of 1939 was the Lombardo, Marks & Hill ballad, "Address Unknown". Other successful hits from 1939 and early 1940 included "My Prayer", "Bless You", "Memories of You", and "I'm Gettin' Sentimental Over You".

== 1940s ==
=== Recordings ===
Between the years 1940 and 1949 the Ink Spots landed well over 30 hits on the US Pop Charts with 18 of them on the top 10. The group's first Billboard No. 1 hit came in 1944, when they teamed up with Ella Fitzgerald to record "I'm Making Believe". This recording featured Bill Kenny. In 1946, the Ink Spots earned another No. 1 spot on the US Pop Charts with "To Each His Own". The Billy Reid composition "The Gypsy" was the Ink Spots' biggest chart success, staying at the No. 1 position on the Billboard Best Sellers chart for 10 straight weeks in 1946.

Other hits for the Ink Spots in the 1940s included "When the Swallows Come Back to Capistrano", "Maybe", "We Three", "I Don't Want to Set the World on Fire", "Don't Get Around Much Anymore", "A Lovely Way to Spend an Evening", "Into Each Life Some Rain Must Fall", and "I'm Beginning to See the Light".

=== Films ===
In 1941, the Ink Spots were featured in The Great American Broadcast starring John Payne and Alice Faye. In the film, the Ink Spots play Pullman porters who sing during their breaks and ultimately "make it big time" and sing live on the radio during a national broadcast. The group sings a short segment of "If I Didn't Care", "Alabamy Bound", and "I've Got a Bone to Pick with You". They also provide background vocals to Faye and Payne on a ballad entitled "Where You Are".

The following year, the Ink Spots were featured in an Abbott and Costello film, Pardon My Sarong. In this film, the Ink Spots play singing waiters in a nightclub. They sing the ballad Do I Worry? and the swing song "Shout Brother Shout".

=== Line-up changes ===
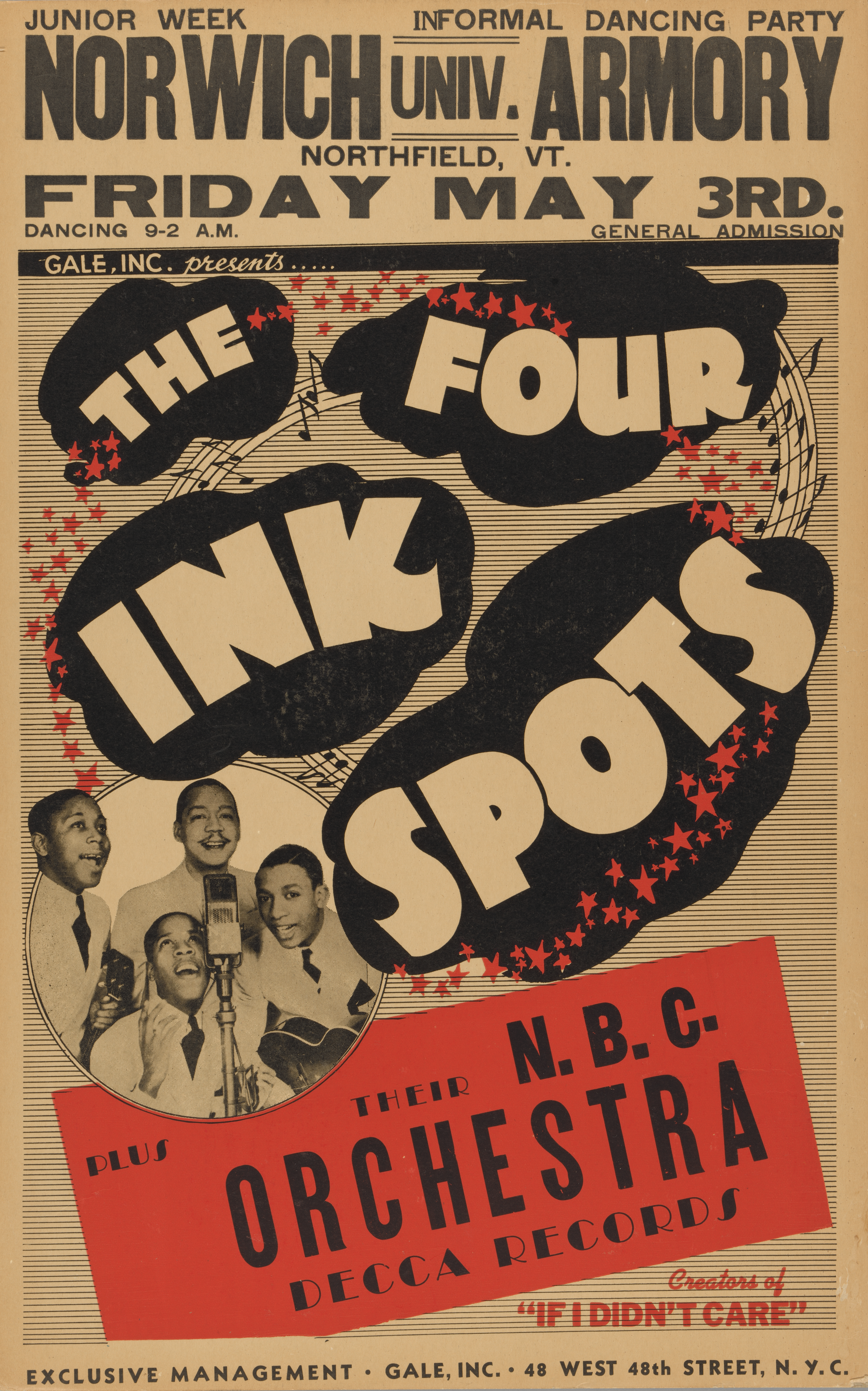
A poster for the group promoting an appearance with the NBC Symphony Orchestra circa 1946

In 1943, Ink Spots baritone singer and guitarist Fuqua was drafted into the US Army. He chose his friend Bernie Mackey to be his temporary replacement until he returned to the group. After being with the group for two years, Mackey was replaced by Huey Long in March 1945. Long completed the role as a "fill in" until Fuqua finally returned in October 1945.

Jones died in October 1944, after collapsing on stage at the Cafe Zanzibar in New York City, near the height of the Ink Spots' popularity. He had been having cerebral hemorrhages for a year and had fallen ill from the condition in June 1944. Jones was temporarily replaced by Cliff Givens, who filled in from October 1944 to March 1945, before a permanent replacement was found in Bill Kenny's brother (and fraternal twin) Herb Kenny. Herb Kenny sang with the group from 1945 to 1951, when he began a career as a solo artist. The last bass singer in the Ink Spots was Adriel McDonald, who was with the group from 1951 to 1954. McDonald was previously the Ink Spots' personal valet, a job given to him by Herb Kenny, with whom he had sung in a group called "The Cabineers" in the early 1940s.

Due to personality clashes between Bill Kenny and Watson after Jones' death, Kenny decided he would rather carry on as the leader of the group and bought Watson's share of the group for $10,000, which gave him the power to kick Watson out of the group. Watson went on to form a group similar in style to the Ink Spots called the Brown Dots (which later became the Four Tunes), and his place was filled by Billy "Butterball" Bowen, who sang with the Ink Spots from 1944 to 1952.

== 1950s ==
=== Final years ===
In 1952, Fuqua left the group to form his own vocal group using the name "Ink Spots". At this time, Kenny and Fuqua each owned 50% of the Ink Spots, and it was decided by court ruling that Kenny's group was to continue on as the original "Ink Spots", while Fuqua's group was to use the name "Charlie Fuqua's New Ink Spots". Defying the court ruling, Fuqua instead called his group the "Original" Ink Spots.

Fuqua was replaced in the Ink Spots by jazz and R&B guitarist Everett Barksdale, so the group now consisted of Bill Kenny (lead tenor), Teddy Williams (second tenor), who had replaced Bowen, Everett Barksdale (baritone and guitar), and McDonald (bass). After being with the group for only a few months, Williams was replaced by Ernie Brown. Barksdale stayed with the group for about a year before being replaced by baritone vocalist and guitar player Jimmy Cannady. This line-up of Kenny (lead tenor), Brown (second tenor), Cannady (baritone and guitar), and McDonald (bass) lasted until 1954, when the final change of lineup was made.

In April 1954, Brown was replaced by Henry Braswell, who sang with the Ink Spots for their final three months. Kenny officially disbanded the Ink Spots in July 1954, after an appearance at the Bolero Bar in Wildwood, New Jersey.

== Members ==
Inducted into the Rock and Roll Hall of Fame

- Hoppy Jones (born as Orville Jones, February 17, 1905, Chicago, Illinois – d. October 18, 1944, New York City) sang bass and did spoken word. He played a small cello in the manner of a stand up bass.
- Deek Watson (born as Ivory Jones, July 18, 1909 (some sources say 1913), Mounds, Illinois – d. November 4, 1969, Washington, D.C.) sang tenor and played tenor guitar.
- Jerry Daniels (b. December 14, 1915 – d. November 7, 1995, Indianapolis, Indiana) sang tenor and played guitar and ukulele.
- Charlie Fuqua (b. October 20, 1910 – d. c. 1970, New Haven, Connecticut) had a baritone voice and played guitar and tenor guitar.
- Bill Kenny (b. June 12, 1914, Philadelphia, Pennsylvania, U.S. – d. March 23, 1978, New Westminster, Canada) sang lead tenor.

== Non-original Ink Spots groups ==
Disputes over the rights to use the Ink Spots name began in the late 1940s, resulting in many court cases. Starting in 1954, groups calling themselves "The Ink Spots" sprang up all around the United States. Some groups contained original members Fuqua, McDonald, Bowen, or Watson, but most had no ties to the original group whatsoever. Many groups claimed to have the rights to the name, but no one did. Still, lawsuits were filed between various groups and there was great confusion as to who owned the naming rights. Some groups avoided lawsuits by naming themselves "The Fabulous Ink Spots", "The Famous Ink Spots", "The Amazing Ink Spots", "The Sensational Ink Spots", "The Dynamic Ink Spots", and more.

According to writer Marv Goldberg: "The original group was a partnership, not a corporation, and that influenced judge Isidor Wasservogel to say, in 1955, that when Hoppy Jones died in 1944, it effectively served to terminate the partnership and that no one could truthfully use the name after that." From 1954 to the present, more than 100 groups have used the name "The Ink Spots". In 1967 US federal judge Emmet C. Choate ruled that since so many groups had been using the name "Ink Spots" it had become "public domain" and was free for anyone to use.

=== Charlie Fuqua's Ink Spots ===
In 1952, Fuqua left the original Ink Spots led by Kenny to form his own Ink Spots group. Fuqua recorded dozens of singles with his group for King Records as well as releasing two LP (long play) albums for Verve Records. In 1963 Fuqua's group also recorded one 45 RPM record for Ford Records. Fuqua led and was a member of various vocal groups calling themselves "The Ink Spots" until his death in 1971.

=== Deek Watson's Ink Spots ===
Watson, who had been forced out of the original Ink Spots in 1944 and briefly sang with Charlie Fuqua's Ink Spots in 1952–1953, started his own vocal group using the name "The Ink Spots" in 1954. Watson made numerous recordings with his "Ink Spots" groups in the 1950s and 1960s. Many of the recordings Watson made with his groups were released and re-released on various low budget labels. Watson led various groups until his death in 1969.

== Legitimate members of the Ink Spots ==
Legitimate members of the Ink Spots included Bill Kenny, Jerry Daniels, Deek Watson, Charlie Fuqua, Hoppy Jones, Bernie Mackey, Huey Long, Cliff Givens, Billy Bowen, Herb Kenny, Adriel McDonald, Jimmy Cannady, Ernie Brown, Henry Braswell, Teddy Williams and Everett Barksdale. Pianists and arrangers included Bob Benson, Asa "Ace" Harris, Ken Bryan, Mort Howard (arranger), Bill Doggett, Ray Tunia, Harold Francis and Fletcher Smith. Some singers have tenuous ties to Deek Watson's or Charlie Fuqua's offshoot groups; many, with no credentials whatsoever, claim to be original members.

== Deaths ==
- Orville "Hoppy" Jones (born February 17, 1905, in Chicago, Illinois) (Ink Spots member from 1931 to 1944) died on October 18, 1944, after collapsing at the Cafe Zanzibar in New York City aged 39.
- Bob Benson (born December 20, 1908, in Mercer County, West Virginia) (Ink Spots pianist for a time) died on September 7, 1945, in Detroit, Michigan aged 36.
- Asa "Ace" Harris (born April 1, 1910, in New York) (Ink Spots pianist and arranger from 1940 to 1942) died June 11, 1964, in Chicago aged 54. He is not to be confused with a man named John Harris who toured with a fake Ink Spots group and used the "Ace" nickname and pretended to be Ace Harris before his death in 2000.
- Deek Watson (born as Ivory Jones, July 18, 1909, in Mounds, Illinois) (Ink Spots member from 1931 to 1944) died from a stroke on November 4, 1969, in Washington, D.C..
- Charlie Fuqua (born October 20, 1910, in West Virginia) (Ink Spots member from 1931 to 1942 / 1945 to 1951) died December 21, 1971, in West Haven, Connecticut aged 61.
- Harold Francis (born Harold L. Francis, July 26, 1918, in New York) (Ink Spots pianist for a time) died February 4, 1975, aged 56.
- Bill Kenny (born June 12, 1914, in Philadelphia, Pennsylvania) (Ink Spots member from 1936 to 1954) died from a respiratory illness on March 23, 1978, in New Westminster, Canada aged 63.
- Bernie Mackey (born July 12, 1909, in The Bahamas) (Ink Spots member from 1943 to 1945) died in Miami, Florida from cancer on March 12, 1980, aged 70.
- Billy Bowen (born January 3, 1909, in Birmingham, Alabama) (Ink Spots member from 1944 to 1951) died from a short illness on September 27, 1982, in New York City aged 73.
- Ernie Brown (born September 28, 1925, in Lakeland, Minnesota) (Ink Spots member from 1952 to 1954) died on July 1, 1983, in Hyattsville, Maryland aged 57.
- Ray Tunia (born May 10, 1916, in Atlantic City, New Jersey) (Ink Spots pianist for a time) died August 16, 1983, in Manhattan aged 67.
- Jimmy Canady (born May 30, 1914, in St. Louis, Missouri) (Ink Spots gutiarist for a time) died February 1, 1984, in Hempstead, New York aged 69.
- Everett Barksdale (born April 28, 1910, in Detroit, Michigan) (Ink Spots member in 1952) died on January 29, 1986, in Inglewood, California aged 75.
- Adriel McDonald (born May 10, 1905, in Virgin Islands) (Ink Spots member from 1951 to 1954) died on September 1, 1987, in Manhattan aged 82.
- Cliff Givens (born January 17, 1918, in Newark, New Jersey) (Ink Spots member from 1944 to 1945) died June 6, 1989, in Los Angeles, California aged 71.
- Herb Kenny (born Herbert C. Kenny June 12, 1914, in Philadelphia, Pennsylvania) (Ink Spots member from 1945 to 1950) died from cancer on July 11, 1992, aged 78.
- Fletcher Smith (born September 22, 1913, in Lincoln, Nebraska) (Ink Spots pianist for a time) died on August 15, 1993, in Los Angeles, California aged 79.
- Jerry Daniels (born December 14, 1915) (Ink Spots member from 1931 to 1935) died on November 7, 1995, in Indianapolis, Indiana aged 79.
- Bill Doggett (born February 16, 1916) (Ink Spots pianist and arranger from 1942 to 1944) died from cancer in New York on November 13, 1996, aged 80.
- Huey Long (born April 25, 1904, in Sealy, Texas) (Ink Spots member in 1945) died on June 10, 2009, in Houston aged 105.
- Henry Braswell (born September 15, 1929, in Halifax, North Carolina) (Ink Spots member in 1954) died on October 7, 2016, in Camden, New Jersey aged 87.

It is unknown if Teddy Williams (born June 20, 1927, in Manhattan) (Ink Spots member in 1952) is still alive or not as there are no types of certificates (e.g. Marriage, death) matching his details from 1952 onwards. Marv Goldberg, who wrote an article about Williams published in 2025, stated: "There was never another word about Teddy Williams, not even a record of his death. I don't know if he ever married or had any children. There's even a slim chance that he's still alive." If still alive, Williams will be 99 as of 2026.

Additional deaths:

- Slim Green (born Elmer Oliver, birthdate unknown) (member of pre-Ink Spots group "The Four Riff Brothers") died on April 30, 1938, after suffering from pneumonia.
- Miff Campbell (born Mifflin James Campbell, January 22, 1906, in Indianapolis, Indiana) (member of pre-Ink Spots group "The Four Riff Brothers") died on April 2, 1995, in Indianapolis aged 89.

== Legacy and honors ==
- 1946 - Cashbox award for "The Gypsy" being the biggest money-making song of the year.
- 1948 - Negro Actors Guild of America awarded a plaque for their efforts in "breaking down the walls of racial prejudice".
- 1989 - the Ink Spots were inducted into the Rock and Roll Hall of Fame as "early influences" by Bobby McFerrin; the members were listed as Bill Kenny, Charlie Fuqua, Deek Watson, Jerry Daniels, and Orville Jones.
- 1989 - the Ink Spots' 1939 recording of "If I Didn't Care" was inducted into the Grammy Hall of Fame.
- 1999 - the Ink Spots were inducted into the Vocal Group Hall of Fame.

== In popular culture ==
=== Television appearances ===
The Ink Spots were television pioneers when, on November 6, 1936, they were the first musical group to perform live on television, during an NBC test broadcast held at the NBC/RCA Building for the press.

In 1948, they were the first black performers to appear on The Ed Sullivan Show.

In 2015 The Ink Spots version of "Address Unknown" plays in the opening scene of Better Call Saul episode one season one.

In 2025, The Ink Spots' version of "We'll Meet Again" was featured on the fifth episode of the show Alien: Earth. That same year, the group's version of "If I Didn't Care" was used at the end of the South Park episode "The Woman in the Hat".

=== Other homages and references ===
In Glenn Miller's 1942 song "Jukebox Saturday Night", The Ink Spots are directly mentioned and an homage is done.

In 1945, Spike Jones recorded a parody cover of "You Always Hurt the One You Love" in an Ink Spots impression. The original song was recorded by a group they were often compared to, The Mills Brothers, just a year prior to Jones' cover.

The Beatles, at the time known as The Quarrymen, attempted to imitate The Ink Spots in the song "You'll Be Mine". It was only ever recorded as a demo. Paul McCartney sang in a deep baritone and John Lennon sang backing vocals in falsetto and spoken word.

The Ink Spots' music features prominently in the work of Dennis Potter, most notably in his 1986 series The Singing Detective.

The group's music is heavily featured throughout the Fallout franchise. Songs have appeared in all pieces of mainline Fallout media, with the exception of Fallout 2. "Maybe" is played during the opening sequence of the 1997 video game Fallout. "I Don't Want to Set the World on Fire" is played during the opening sequences of the 2008 video game Fallout 3. "It's a Sin to Tell a Lie" is featured in the 2010 video game Fallout: New Vegas. "It's All Over But the Crying" is featured in the 2015 video game Fallout 4. Six of the group's songs feature in the Fallout TV series, although all six of the songs have featured in previous Fallout media.

"If I Didn't Care" is played during the opening of the film The Shawshank Redemption.

On the sitcom Sanford and Son, the character Fred Sanford would often perform an impression of The Ink Spots, singing "If I Didn't Care".

== Selected discography ==
=== Compilation albums ===
- Ink Spots (1946)
- If I Didn't Care (1979)

=== Select Singles ===
Year	Single	Chart positions	
Year	Single	US (Note: Joel Whitburn's methodology for creating pre-1940s chart placings has been criticised, and therefore should not be taken as definitive.)	US R&B
1939	"If I Didn't Care"	2	—
1939	"You Bring Me Down"	14	—
1939	"Address Unknown"	1	—
1939	"It's Funny to Everyone but Me"	—	—
1939	"My Prayer"	3	—
1939	"Bless You for Being an Angel"	15	—
1940	"Memories of You"	29	—
1940	"I'm Gettin' Sentimental Over You"	26	—
1940	"When the Swallows Come Back to Capistrano"	4	—
1940	"Whispering Grass (Don't Tell the Trees)"	10	—
1940	"Maybe"	2	—
1940	"Stop Pretending"	16	—
1940	"You're Breaking My Heart All Over Again"	17	—
1940	"We Three (My Echo, My Shadow and Me)"	1	—
1940	"My Greatest Mistake"	12	—
1940	"Java Jive"	15	—
1941	"Please Take a Letter, Miss Brown"	25	—
1941	Do I Worry?	8	—
1941	"I'm Still Without a Sweetheart ('Cause I'm Still in Love with You)"	19	—
1941	"So Sorry"	24	—
1941	"Until the Real Thing Comes Along"	24	—
1941	"I Don't Want to Set the World on Fire"	4	—
1941	"Someone's Rocking My Dreamboat"	17	—
1942	"Ev'ry Night About This Time"	17	6
1942	"This Is Worth Fighting For"	—	9
1942	"Just as Though You Were Here"	—	10
1943	"Don't Get Around Much Anymore"	2	1
1943	"If I Cared a Little Bit Less"	20	10
1943	"I'll Never Make the Same Mistake Again"	19	—
1943	"I Can't Stand Losing You"	—	1
1944	"Don't Believe Everything You Dream"	14	6
1944	"Cow Cow Boogie (Cuma-Ti-Yi-Yi-Ay)" (with Ella Fitzgerald)	10	1
1944	"A Lovely Way to Spend an Evening"	2	—
1944	"I'll Get By (As Long as I Have You)"	7	4
1944	"Someday I'll Meet You Again"	14	—
1944	"I'm Making Believe" (with Ella Fitzgerald)	1	2
1944	"Into Each Life Some Rain Must Fall" (with Ella Fitzgerald)	1	1
1945	"I'm Beginning to See the Light" (with Ella Fitzgerald)	5	—
1946	"The Gypsy"	1	1
1946	"Prisoner of Love"	9	5
1946	"To Each His Own"	1	3
1947	"You Can't See the Sun When You're Crying"	19	—
1947	"Ask Anyone Who Knows"	17	5
1948	"The Best Things in Life Are Free"	—	10
1948	"Say Something Sweet to Your Sweetheart"	22	—
1948	"You Were Only Fooling (While I Was Falling in Love)"	8	15
1949	"You're Breaking My Heart"	9	—
1949	"Who Do You Know in Heaven (That Made You the Angel You Are?)"	21	—
1950	"Echoes"	24	—
1950	"Sometime"	26	—
1951	"If"	23	—
1951	"It Is No Secret" (Bill Kenny solo)	18	—
1952	"(That's Just My Way of) Forgetting You" (Bill Kenny solo)	23	—

== See also ==
- The Bill Kenny Show
