= List of songs recorded by Perry Como =

The following is a list of selected recordings by Perry Como (all on RCA Victor except where Ted Weems orchestra is referenced; in those cases, on Decca):

Song	Music by	Lyrics by	Year	Notes
A
"Abide with Me"	William Henry Monk	Henry Francis Lyte	1953	with Mitchell Ayres Orchestra & Ray Charles Singers
"Act of Contrition"	Joseph J. Leahy	Traditional	1953	with Mitchell Ayres Orchestra & Ray Charles Singers
"Ac-Cent-Tchu-Ate the Positive"	Harold Arlen	Johnny Mercer	1958	with Mitchell Ayres Orchestra & Ray Charles Singers
"Ac-Cent-Tchu-Ate the Positive"	Harold Arlen	Johnny Mercer	1980	Part of Bing Crosby Medley
"Ad de Day"	Herman Hupfeld		1939	with Ted Weems & his Orchestra
"Ain't Misbehavin'"	Thomas "Fats" Waller; Harry Brooks	Andy Razaf	1955	with Mitchell Ayres Orchestra (not released)
"All at Once You Love Her"	Richard Rodgers	Oscar Hammerstein II	1955	with Mitchell Ayres Orchestra & Ray Charles Singers; From the musical Pipe Dream
"All By Myself"	Irving Berlin; Arranged by Jack Andrews & Joe Lipman		1961	with Mitchell Ayres Orchestra featuring Guitar played by Tony Mottola
"All I Do is Dream of You"	Nacio Herb Brown	Arthur Freed	1961	with Mitchell Ayres Orchestra featuring Guitar played by Tony Mottola; Performed in a medley with two other songs
"All Through the Day"	Jerome Kern	Oscar Hammerstein II	1945	with Russ Case & his Orchestra; From the film Centennial Summer
"All Through the Night"	Traditional Old Welsh Air; Arranged by Ray Charles		1958	with Ray Charles Singers & unidentified organ accompaniment
"Almost Like Being in Love"	Frederick Loewe	Alan Jay Lerner	1958	with Mitchell Ayres Orchestra & Ray Charles Singers; Part of the "We Get Letters" Medley
"And I Love You So"	Don McLean		1973	
"And I Love You So"	Don McLean		1980	
"And Roses and Roses"	Ray Gilbert; Dorival Caymmi; Arranged by Nick Perito		1966	with Nick Perito Orchestra & Ray Charles Singers
"Anema e core"	Salvatore "Salve" D'Esposito	Italian: Tito Manlio English: Manny Curtis; Harry Akst	1966	with the Allesandro Allessandroni Singers
"Angeline"	Edward Ross; Si Rothman		1941	with the Ted Weems Orchestra
"Another Go 'Round"	Gloria Shayne; Noël Regney; Arranged by Nick Perito		1967	with Nick Perito Orchestra & Ray Charles Singers
"Arrivederci Roma (Goodbye to Rome)"	Renato Ranucci	Italian: Pietro Garinei; Sandro Giovannini; English: Carl Sigman	1966	with the Allesandro Allessandroni Singers
"As My Love for You"	George Fischoff; Arranged by Byron Olsen		1982	with Nick Perito Orchestra; Released in 1983
"As Time Goes By"	Herman Hupfeld; Arranged by Joe Reisman		1955	with Mitchell Ayres Orchestra & Ray Charles Singers
"Aubrey"	David A. Gates; Arranged by Bergen White		1973	
"Ave Maria (Schubert)"	Franz Schubert	(public domain); Prayer based on Luke 1:28 in Holy Bible	1949	with Choir & Organ directed by Mitchell Ayres & Ray Charles
"Ave Maria (Schubert)"	Franz Schubert	(public domain); Prayer based on Luke 1:28 in Holy Bible	1959	with Robert Shaw Male Chorale & Mitchell Ayres Orchestra
"Ave Maria (Schubert)"	Franz Schubert	(public domain); Prayer based on Luke 1:28 in Holy Bible	1968	arranged & adapted by Nick Perito features vocal backing from the Ray Charles Singers
"'A' — You're Adorable"	Sidney Lippman	Fred Wise; Buddy Kaye	1949	with The Fontane Sisters featuring instrumental backing from Mitchell Ayres Orchestra
B
"Back in Your Own Backyard"	Dave Dreyer; Al Jolson	Billy Rose	1961	with Mitchell Ayres Orchestra and Ray Charles Singers (not released)
"Baia"	Ary Evangelista Barroso	Portuguese: Ary Evangelista Barroso English: Ray Gilbert	1966	with Nick Perito Orchestra & Ray Charles Singers
"Bali Ha'i"	Richard Rodgers	Oscar Hammerstein II	1949	with Mitchell Ayres Orchestra
"Beady Eyed Buzzard"	Richard Ahlert; Eddie Snyder; Arranged by Anita Kerr		1965	with the Anita Kerr Quartet; Released in June 1969
"Beats There a Heart So True"	Jack Keller; Noel Sherman		1958	with Mitchell Ayres Orchestra and Ray Charles Singers
"Beautiful Noise"	Neil Diamond		1980	
"Because"	Guy d'Hardelot	Edward Teschemacher	1947	with Russ Case & his Orchestra
"Begin the Beguine"	Cole Porter		1958	with Mitchell Ayres Orchestra (not released)
"Begin the Beguine"	Cole Porter		1959	with Mitchell Ayres Orchestra
"Begin the Beguine"	Cole Porter		1972	from the NBC-TV special Cole Porter in Paris
"Behind Closed Doors"	Kenny O'Dell		1974	with The Ray Charles Singers
"Bella Bella Sue"	Barry Parker; Anthony Roberto; Fran Smith		1958	with Mitchell Ayres Orchestra and Ray Charles Singers
"The Bells of St. Mary's"	A. Emmett Adams	Douglas Furber	1962	with Mitchell Ayres Orchestra & Ray Charles Singers (not released)
"The Best Thing For You (Would Be Me)"	Irving Berlin		1950	with Mitchell Ayres Orchestra; From the Broadway musical Call Me Madam
"The Best of Times"	Jerry Herman		1983	with Ray Charles Singers from the Broadway musical La Cage Aux Folles
"The Best of Times"	Jerry Herman		1987	with Nick Perito Orchestra
"Better Luck Next Time"	Irving Berlin		1947	with Russ Case & his Orchestra; From the film Easter Parade
"Between the Devil and the Deep Blue Sea"	Harold Arlen	Ted Koehler	1958	with Mitchell Ayres Orchestra
"Beyond Tomorrow (Love Theme from Serpico)"	Mikis Theodorakis; Larry Kusik		1974	with the Ray Charles Singers
"Bibbidi-Bobbidi-Boo (The Magic Song)"	Al Hoffman; Mack David	Jerry Livingston	1949	
"Birth of the Blues"	Ray Henderson	Lew Brown; B. G. DeSylva	1958	with Mitchell Ayres Orchestra and Ray Charles Singers
"Black Moonlight"	Arthur Johnston	Sam Coslow	1950	with Orchestra & Chorus directed by Sigmund Romberg & Mitchell Ayres
"Bless the Beasts and Children"	Perry Botkin Jr. Barry DeVorzon; Arranged by Nick Perito		1987	with Nick Perito Orchestra featuring Violin Solo by Jerry Vinci
"Bless This House"	May H. Morgan (aka Brahe); Helen Taylor		1950	with Mitchell Ayres Women's Choir featuring Organ played by Charles Marie Courboin
"Blue Room"	Richard Rodgers	Lorenz Hart	1948 (twice)	RCA Version with Henri René Orchestra & Chorus
"Blue Room"	Richard Rodgers	Lorenz Hart	1948 (twice)	MGM Version with Robert Tucker Chorus; From the film Words and Music
"Blue Skies"	Irving Berlin		1946	with Russ Case Orchestra
"Blue Skies"	Irving Berlin		1961	with Mitchell Ayres & his Orchestra featuring Guitar played by Tony Mottola performed in a medley with two other songs
"Blue Skies"	Irving Berlin		1980	Part of Bing Crosby Medley
"Body and Soul"	Johnny Green	Frank Eyton; Edward Heyman; Robert B. Sour	1947	with Russ Case & his Orchestra; From the film Body and Soul
"Breezin' Along with the Breeze"	Haven Gillespie; Seymour Simons; Richard Whiting		1955	with Mitchell Ayres Orchestra; From the Hollywood musical Pete Kelly's Blues
"Brian's Song (The Hands of Time)"	Michel Legrand	Marilyn and Alan Bergman	1974	with the Ray Charles Singers
"Bridge over Troubled Water"	Paul Simon; Arranged by Don Costa		1971	with Don Costa Orchestra & Ray Charles Singers
"Bummin' Around"	Pete Graves		1965	(not released)
"Buongiorno Teresa"	Jimmy Lytell; Dick Manning		1968	with the Ray Charles Singers; Released in June 1969
"A Bushel and a Peck"	Frank Loesser		1950	with Betty Hutton featuring instrumental backing from Mitchell Ayres Orchestra
"But Beautiful"	Jimmy Van Heusen	Johnny Burke	1980	Part of Bing Crosby Medley
"Butterfly (I'll Set You Free)"	L. Russell Brown	Irwin Levine	1987	with Nick Perito Orchestra
"Bye Bye Little Girl"	Wayne P. Walker; Don Schroeder		1965	(not released)
"By the Way"	Joseph Myrow	Mack Gordon	1947	with Russ Case & his Orchestra; From the film When My Baby Smiles at Me
C
"Can't Help Falling in Love"	George David Weiss; Hugo Peretti; Luigi Creatore		1962	with Mitchell Ayres Orchestra & Ray Charles Singers
"Cara Cara Bella Bella"	Lucius del Guercio (aka Jean Alexander)	English: Ray Carter & Lucile Johnson	1951	with Mitchell Ayres & his Orchestra
"Carnival"	Luiz Bonfá	Portuguese: Antônio Maria; English: George David Weiss; Hugo Peretti; Luigi Creatore	1963	with Mitchell Ayres Orchestra
"Carnival"	Luiz Bonfá	Portuguese: Antônio Maria; English: George David Weiss; Hugo Peretti; Luigi Creatore	1966	with Nick Perito Orchestra & Ray Charles Singers
"Carol Medley"	A medley of: Caroling, Caroling; The First Noël; Hark! The Herald Angels Sing; Silent Night		1968	with the Ray Charles Singers
"Carolina Moon"	Joe Burke	Benny Davis	1947	with Lloyd Shaffer Orchestra
"Catch a Falling Star"	Lee Pockriss; Paul Vance		1957	with Mitchell Ayres Orchestra & the Ray Charles Singers
"Caterina"	Earl Shuman; Maurice "Bugs" Bower		1962	with Mitchell Ayres Orchestra & the Ray Charles Singers
"Chee Chee-Oo Chee (Sang the Little Bird)"	Saverio Seracini	Italian: Ettore Minoretti English: John Turner; Geoffrey Parsons	1955	with Jaye P. Morgan featuring instrumental backing from Mitchell Ayres Orchestra
"Chi-Baba, Chi-Baba (My Bambino Go to Sleep)"	Al Hoffman; Jerry Livingston	Mack David	1947	with The Satisfiers featuring instrumental backing from Lloyd Shaffer Orchestra
"Childhood is a Meadow"	Charles Tobias; Frederick K. Tobias; Jerry Tobias		1952	with Mitchell Ayres & his Orchestra
"Chincherinchee"	John Jerome		1956	with Mitchell Ayres Orchestra & Ray Charles Singers
"Christ is Born"	Monsignor Domenico Bartolucci	English :Ray Charles	1968	with the Ray Charles Singers
"C-H-R-I-S-T-M-A-S"	Eddy Arnold	Jenny Lou Carson	1953	with Mitchell Ayres & his Orchestra
"Christmas Bells (In the Steeple)"	Ray Stevens; Arranged by Bill McElhiney		1967	with Bill McElhiney Orchestra
"Christmas Dream"	Andrew Lloyd Webber	German: André Heller; English: Tim Rice	1974	with the London Boy Singers from the soundtrack of the film The Odessa File
"Christmas Eve"	Gerard Andre Biesel	Ray Charles	1968	with the Ray Charles Singers
"The Christmas Song (Merry Christmas to You)"	Mel Tormé	Robert Wells	1953	Both versions featuring instrumental backing from Mitchell Ayres & his Orchestra
"The Christmas Song (Merry Christmas to You)"	Mel Tormé	Robert Wells	1959	Both versions featuring instrumental backing from Mitchell Ayres & his Orchestra
"The Christmas Symphony"	Phil Perry; Joe Candullo; Charles Faso Reade		1950	with Mitchell Ayres Orchestra & Chorus
"Class Will Tell"	Joseph A. Burke; Edgar Leslie		1939	with the Ted Weems Orchestra
"Close"	Cole Porter		1957	with Mitchell Ayres Orchestra & Ray Charles Singers (not released)
"(They Long to Be) Close to You"	Burt Bacharach	Hal David	1970	with Nick Perito Orchestra
"Cold, Cold Heart"	Hank Williams		1951	with Mitchell Ayres Orchestra (not released)
"The Colors of My Life"	Cy Coleman	Michael Stewart	1980	from the Broadway musical Barnum
"Come Rain or Come Shine"	Harold Arlen	Johnny Mercer	1958	with Mitchell Ayres Orchestra & Ray Charles Singers
"Cominciamo ad amarci"	Gino Mescoli	Italian: Vito Pallavicini	1966	with the Allesandro Allessandroni Singers
"Coming Back for More"	Unknown		1976	(not released)
"Coo Coo Roo Coo Coo Paloma"	Sosa Tomas Mendez	Patricia P. Valando; English: Ronnie Carson	1965	with Nick Perito Orchestra & Ray Charles Singers; Released in 1966
D
"Dance Ballerina Dance"	Bob Russell; Carl Sigman		1947	
"Dance Only with Me"	Jule Styne	Betty Comden; Adolph Green	1958	with Mitchell Ayres Orchestra & Ray Charles Singers
"Dancin'"	Jerry Leiber; Mike Stoller; Arranged by Joe Reisman		1957	with Mitchell Ayres Orchestra & Ray Charles Singers
"Days of Wine and Roses"	Henry Mancini	Johnny Mercer	1963	with Mitchell Ayres Orchestra & Ray Charles Singers
"Dear Hearts and Gentle People"	Sammy Fain	Bob Hilliard	1959	with Mitchell Ayres Orchestra
"Dear Hearts and Gentle People"	Sammy Fain	Bob Hilliard	1980	part of "Bing Crosby Medley"
"'Deed I Do"	Fred Rose	Walter Hirsch	1957	with Como's Little Combo (a section of Mitchell Ayres Orchestra)
"Deep in the Heart of Texas"	Don Swander	June Hershey	1941	with the Ted Weems Orchestra
"Deep in Your Heart"	Jan Crutchfield		1967	Released in June 1969
"Delaware"	Irving Gordon		1959	with Mitchell Ayres Orchestra & Ray Charles Singers
"Did Anyone Ever Tell You, Mrs. Murphy?"	Karl Suessdorf	Lloyd Sloan; Leah Worth	1949	with Mitchell Ayres & his Orchestra
"(Did You Ever Get) That Feeling in the Moonlight"	James Cavanaugh; Larry Stock; Ira Schuster		1945	with The Satisfiers and features instrumental backing from Russell Case Orchestra
"Dig You Later (A Hubba-Hubba-Hubba)"	Jimmy McHugh	Harold Adamson	1945	with The Satisfiers features instrumental backing from Russ Case Orchestra from the Hollywood musical Doll Face
"Dindi"	Antonio Carlos Jobim	Aloysio De Oliveira; English: Ray Gilbert	1966	with Nick Perito Orchestra & Ray Charles Singers
"The Donkey Serenade"	Rudolf Friml; Herbert Stothart	George Forest; Robert Wright	1959	with Mitchell Ayres Orchestra
"Don't Ask Me Why"	Ben Weisman	Fred Wise	1954	with Mitchell Ayres & his Orchestra (not released)
"Don't Blame Me"	Jimmy McHugh	Dorothy Fields	1943	
"Don't Leave Me"	Harry Nilsson		1970	with Marty Manning Orchestra and unidentified background singers
"Don't Let the Stars Get in Your Eyes"	Slim Willet		1952	with The Ramblers features instrumental backing from Hugo Winterhalter Orchestra
"Don't Let the Stars Get in Your Eyes"	Slim Willet		1980	
"Door of Dreams"	Robert Allen	Al Stillman	1954	with Hugo Winterhalter Orchestra & Ray Charles Singers (not released)
"Door of Dreams"	Robert Allen	Al Stillman	1955	with Mitchell Ayres Orchestra & Ray Charles Singers
"Do You Hear What I Hear?"	Noël Regney; Gloria Shayne		1968	with the Ray Charles Singers
"Do You Remember Me"	Nick Perito	Richard B. Matheson	1987	with Nick Perito Orchestra
"Dream Along with Me (I'm on My Way to a Star)"	Carl Sigman		1956	with Mitchell Ayres Orchestra & Ray Charles Singers
"Dream Along with Me (I'm on My Way to a Star)"	Carl Sigman		1958	with Mitchell Ayres Orchestra & Ray Charles Singers
"Dream Baby (How Long Must I Dream)"	Cindy Walker; Arranged by Don Costa		1971	with Don Costa Orchestra & Ray Charles Singers
"A Dream Is a Wish Your Heart Makes"	Franz Liszt; Adaptation: Al Hoffman; Jerry Livingston	Mack David	1949	with Mitchell Ayres & his Orchestra
"Dream on Little Dreamer"	Jan Crutchfield; Fred Burch; Arranged by Anita Kerr		1965	with the Anita Kerr Quartet
"A Dreamer's Holiday"	Mabel Wayne	Kim Gannon	1949	with The Fontane Sisters features instrumental backing from Mitchell Ayres Orchestra
E
"Easter Parade"	Irving Berlin		1947	with Lloyd Shaffer Orchestra
"E Lei (To You)"	Ugo Calise	Italian: Ugo Calise; English: Ray Charles	1966	with the Allesandro Allessandroni Singers
"El Condor Pasa"	18th Century Folk Melody arranged by Jorge Milchberg; Notation: Daniel Alomía Robles	English: Paul Simon	1970	with Nick Perito Orchestra
"Eli, Eli"	Traditional Jewish Hymn adapted by George Sandler		1953	with Mitchell Ayres Orchestra & Chorus
"Empty Pockets Filled with Love"	Irving Berlin		1962	with Mitchell Ayres Orchestra & Ray Charles Singers
"Eres Tu"	Juan Calderon Lopez	Spanish: Juan Calderon Lopez; English: Jay Livingston; Ray Evans	1974	with the Ray Charles Singers also titled "Eres Tu (Touch the Wind)"
"Especially for the Young"	Ben Weisman	Manny Curtis	1960	with Mitchell Ayres Orchestra & Chorus
"Everybody is Lookin' for an Answer"	Evangeline Seward		1970	with Nick Perito Orchestra
"Everybody's Talking"	Fred Neil		1970	
"Everything"	Unknown; Arranged by Bob Mersey		1976	(not released)
"Everytime I Meet You"	Joseph Myrow	Mack Gordon	1947	with an unidentified orchestra From the film The Beautiful Blonde from Bashful Bend
F
"Fancy Dancer"	Harry Manfredini; John Briggs; Arranged by Byron Olsen		1982	with Nick Perito Orchestra; Released in 1983
"Far Away Places"	Alex Kramer; Joan Whitney; Arranged by Joe Reisman		1948	with Henri René Orchestra
"The Father of Girls"	Ervin M. Drake		1967	with Nick Perito Orchestra & Ray Charles Singers
"The Father of Girls"	Ervin M. Drake		1968	Re-recorded voiceover dub
"The Father of Girls"	Ervin M. Drake		1970	
"Feelings"	Mauricio Kaiserman	Portuguese: Thomas Fundera; English: Morris Albert	1977	with Nick Perito Orchestra; Released in 1978
"A Fellow Needs a Girl"	Richard Rodgers	Oscar Hammerstein II	1947	with Russ Case & his Orchestra from the stage musical Allegro
"A Fellow Needs a Girl"	Richard Rodgers	Oscar Hammerstein II	1961	with Mitchell Ayres & his Orchestra featuring Guitar played by Tony Mottola performed as a medley with two other songs
"First Class Private Mary Brown"	Frank Loesser		1944	Performed A Cappella with an unidentified choir For the Special Services army show About Face
"Fly Me to the Moon"	Bart Howard		1963	with Mitchell Ayres Orchestra
"Fooled"	Franz Lehár; Adaptation: Doris Tauber	English Adaptation: Manny Curtis; Non-English Adaptation: Viktor Leon; Leo Stein	1955	with Mitchell Ayres Orchestra & Ray Charles Singers
"For All We Know"	Fred Karlin	Arthur James; Robb Wilson	1971	with Don Costa Orchestra
"Forever"	George Fischoff; Arranged by Ron Frangipane; Stanley Schwartz		1978	with Nick Perito Orchestra
"Forever and Ever"	Franz Winkler	German: Franz Winkler; English: Malia Rosa	1949	with Mitchell Ayres Orchestra & Chorus
"Forget Domani"	Riz Ortolani; Norman Newell		1966	with the Allesandro Allessandroni Singers
"Forget Me Nots in Your Eyes"	Edgar Leslie; Harry Warren		1944	with Lud Gluskin Orchestra and an unidentified chorus
"For The Good Times"	Kris Kristofferson; Arranged by Bergen White		1973	
"For Me and My Gal"	George W. Meyer	E. Ray Goetz; Edgar Leslie	1955	with Mitchell Ayres Orchestra & Ray Charles Singers
"For You"	Joe Burke	Al Dubin	1947	with Russ Case & his Orchestra
"Frosty the Snowman"	Jack Rollins	Steve Nelson	1953	with Mitchell Ayres Orchestra & Chorus
"Funny How Time Slips Away"	Willie Nelson; Arranged by Anita Kerr		1965	with the Anita Kerr Quartet
G
"A Garden in the Rain"	Carroll Gibbons	James Dyrenforth	1946	with The Satisfiers featuring instrumental backing from Russ Case Orchestra
"Gigi"	Frederick Loewe	Alan Jay Lerner	1961	with Mitchell Ayres Orchestra; Performed in a medley with two other songs
"Girl of My Dreams"	Sunny Clapp		1946	with Russ Case & his Orchestra
"The Girl with the Golden Braids"	Eddie Snyder	Stanley J. Kahan	1957	with Mitchell Ayres Orchestra & Chorus
"Girl You Make It Happen"	Warner Alfred Wilder		1977	with Nick Perito Orchestra and the Tony Mansell Singers; Released in 1978
"Give Me Your Hand"	Dorothy Stewart		1949	with Mitchell Ayres & his Orchestra
"Give Myself a Party"	Don Gibson; Arranged by Anita Kerr		1965	with the Anita Kerr Quartet
"Glad to Be Home"	Irving Berlin		1962	with Mitchell Ayres Orchestra and Ray Charles Singers
"Glendora"	Ray Stanley; Arranged by Joe Reisman		1956	with Mitchell Ayres Orchestra and Ray Charles Singers
"God Rest Ye Merry, Gentlemen"	Traditional Christmas Song		1953	with Mitchell Ayres Orchestra & Chorus
"God Rest Ye Merry, Gentlemen"	Traditional Christmas Song		1959	with Mitchell Ayres Orchestra & Ray Charles Singers
"Goodbye for Now"	Stephen Sondheim; Arranged by Byron Olsen		1981	with Byron Olsen Orchestra; Released in 1983; Love theme from movie Reds
"Goodbye, Sue"	Jimmy Rule; Lou Ricca; Jules Lowman		1943	with a 10-voice Mixed Chorus
"Goodbye, Sue"	Jimmy Rule; Lou Ricca; Jules Lowman		1944	with Benny Goodman & his All-Star Band
"Goodnight, Sweet Dreams, Goodnight"	Teddy Powell; Leonard Whitcup		1938	with Ted Weems Orchestra
"Goodnight, Sweet Jesus"	Reverend James Curry		1953	with Mitchell Ayres Orchestra & Ray Charles Singers
"Goody Goodbye"	Nat Simon	James Cavanaugh	1939	with the Ted Weems Orchestra
"The Grass Keeps Right on Growin'"	Gloria Shayne		1975	with The Nashville Sounds featuring Mike Leech String Section
"Greensleeves"	Traditional Song; Arranged by Ray Charles & Nick Perito		1977	with Nick Perito Orchestra & Tony Mansell Singers
"Gringo's Guitar"	Cindy Walker		1965	
"A Gypsy Told Me"	Jack Yellen; Sam Pokrass		1938	with the Ted Weems Orchestra; From the film Happy Landing
H
"Happiness Comes, Happiness Goes"	Al Stillman; Dick Manning		1965	with the Ray Charles Singers (not released until 2007)
"Happiness Comes, Happiness Goes"	Al Stillman; Dick Manning		1967	with the Ray Charles Singers; Released in June 1969
"Happy Man (If I Ever Find the Time)"	Robert Lee "Bob" McDill		1967 (twice)	New York version with the Ray Charles Singers (not released)
"Happy Together"	Garry Bonner; Alan Gordon		1967	with the Ray Charles Singers (not released)
"Harmony"	Arthur Kaplan; Norman Simon; Arranged by Nick Perito		1974	with Nick Perito Orchestra & Ray Charles Singers (not released)
"A Hatchet, a Hammer, a Bucket of Nails"	Sarah Graham; Richard Ahlert; Eddie Snyder; Arranged by Anita Kerr		1965	with the Anita Kerr Quartet
"Haunted Heart"	Arthur Schwartz	Howard Dietz	1947	with Russ Case & his Orchestra from the musical Inside U.S.A.
"Have I Stayed away Too Long?"	Frank Loesser		1943	A Cappella with an unidentified choir
"Have Yourself a Merry Little Christmas"	Hugh Martin; Ralph Blane		1968	with the Ray Charles Singers
"Having a Lonely Time"	Paul Gibbons; Roy Ringwald		1941	with the Ted Weems Orchestra and Elmo Tanner
"The Hawaiian Wedding Song (Ke Kali Nei Au)"	Charles E. King	Hawaiian: Charles E. King; English: Al Hoffman; Dick Manning	1963	with Mitchell Ayres Orchestra & Ray Charles Singers
"Heartaches for Sale"	Unknown; Arranged by Joe Reisman		1957	with Mitchell Ayres Orchestra & Ray Charles Singers (not released)
"Hearts Will Be Hearts"	Cindy Walker		1967	Released in June 1969
"He Couldn't Love You More"	Giulio Rapetti; Elio Cesari; Alberto Testa	Italian: Giulio Rapetti; Elio Cesari; Alberto Testa; English: Robert I. Allen	1973	(not released)
"Hello, Young Lovers"	Richard Rodgers	Oscar Hammerstein II	1951	with Mitchell Ayres Orchestra
"Hello, Young Lovers"	Richard Rodgers	Oscar Hammerstein II	1960	with Mitchell Ayres Orchestra & Chorus
"Here Comes Heaven (Again)"	Jimmy McHugh	Harold Adamson	1945	with Russ Case Orchestra from the film Doll Face
"Here Comes That Song Again"	Bill Zerface; Jim Zerface; Bob Morrison; Arranged by Byron Olsen		1982	with Nick Perito Orchestra; Released in 1983
"Here Comes My Baby Back Again"	Bill West; Dottie West; Arranged by Anita Kerr		1965	with the Anita Kerr Quartet
"Here We Come A Caroling / We Wish You a Merry Christmas"	Traditional song arranged by Ray Charles		1959	Performed A Cappella with the Ray Charles Singers
"Here's to My Lady"	Rube Bloom	Johnny Mercer	1951	with Mitchell Ayres & his Orchestra
"Here, There and Everywhere"	Lennon–McCartney; Arranged by Cam Mullins		1975	with The Nashville Sounds
"He's Got the Whole World in His Hands"	Traditional Gospel song adapted by Geoff Love		1958	with Mitchell Ayres Orchestra
"He Who Loves"	Burt Bacharach	Hal David	1967	with Nick Perito Orchestra & Ray Charles Singers (not released)
"Hit and Run Affair"	Don Roseland; Ray Cormier; Mel Van		1953	with Hugo Winterhalter Orchestra
"Holy God, We Praise Thy Name"	Traditional Church Music		1950	with St. Patrick's Cathedral Boys Choir featuring Organ played by Charles Marie Courboin
"(There's No Place Like) Home for the Holidays"	Robert Allen	Al Stillman	1954	with Mitchell Ayres Orchestra & Ray Charles Singers
"(There's No Place Like) Home for the Holidays"	Robert Allen	Al Stillman	1959	with Mitchell Ayres Orchestra & Ray Charles Singers
"Honey, Honey (Bless Your Heart)"	Larry Stock	Dominick Belline (nephew of Como's wife, Roselle)	1957	with Como's Little Combo
"Honey, Honey (Bless Your Heart)"	Larry Stock	Dominick Belline (nephew of Como's wife, Roselle)	1959	with Mitchell Ayres Orchestra
"Hoop-Dee-Doo"	Milton de Lugg	Frank Loesser	1950	with the Fontaine Sisters features instrumental backing from Mitchell Ayres Orchestra
"Hopelessly"	Jack Richards; Ed Penney (aka Robert Mellin)		1954	with Ames Brothers featuring instrumental backing from Mitchell Ayres Orchestra (not released)
"Hot Diggity (Dog Ziggity Boom)"	Emmanuel Chabrier; Adaptation: Al Hoffman; Dick Manning	Al Hoffman; Dick Manning	1956	with Mitchell Ayres Orchestra & Ray Charles Singers
"A House is Not a Home"	Burt Bacharach	Hal David	1970	
"How Beautiful the World Can Be"	Buddy Zais		1967	with the Ray Charles Singers
"How Deep is the Ocean"	Irving Berlin; Arranged by Jack Andrews & Joe Lipman		1961	with Mitchell Ayres Orchestra featuring Guitar played by Tony Mottola performed in a medley with two other songs
"How Insensitive"	Antonio Carlos Jobim	Portuguese: Vinicius De Moraes; English: Norman Gimbel	1965	with Nick Perito Orchestra & Ray Charles Singers; Released in 1966
"How to Handle a Woman"	Frederick Loewe	Alan Jay Lerner	1967	with Nick Perito Orchestra & Ray Charles Singers (not released)
"How to Handle a Woman"	Frederick Loewe	Alan Jay Lerner	1968	with Nick Perito Orchestra & Ray Charles Singers
"Hush Little Darlin'"	Bob Haymes	Marty Clarke	1949	with The Fontane Sisters features instrumental backing from Mitchell Ayres Orchestra
I
"I Accuse"	Dick James; Les Johnson; Terry O'Brien; Arranged by Joe Reisman		1957	with Mitchell Ayres Orchestra & Ray Charles Singers (not released)
"I Believe"	Ervin Drake; Al Stillman; Irvin Graham; Jimmy Shirl		1953 (twice)	with Hugo Winterhalter Orchestra & Chorus (not released)
"I Believe"	Ervin Drake; Al Stillman; Irvin Graham; Jimmy Shirl		1953 (twice)	with Mitchell Ayres Orchestra & Chorus
"I Believe in Music"	Mac Davis; Arranged by Bergen White		1973	
"I Can't Remember"	Al Hoffman; Dick Manning		1959	with Mitchell Ayres Orchestra (not released)
"I Concentrate on You"	Cole Porter		1952	with Mitchell Ayres Orchestra
"I Concentrate on You"	Cole Porter		1972	Recorded for the NBC TV special Cole Porter in Paris
"I Confess"	Jack Lawrence; Gunnar Hoffsten; Tryggve Arnesson		1953	
"I Cross My Fingers"	Walter Kent	Walton Farrar	1950	with The Fontane Sisters featuring instrumental backing from Mitchell Ayres Orchestra
"Idle Gossip"	Joseph Meyer	Floyd Huddleston	1953	with Hugo Winterhalter Orchestra & Chorus; First released in 1990 on the Reader's Digest album The Best of Perry Como
"I Don't Know What He Told You"	Giulio Rapetti; Elio Cesari; Alberto Testa; English: Robert I. Allen		1974	Previously recorded in 1973 under the title "He Couldn't Love You More"
"I Don't See Me in Your Eyes Anymore"	Bennie Benjamin; George Weiss		1949	with Mitchell Ayres Orchestra & Chorus
"I Dream of You (More Than You Dream I Do)"	Marjorie Goetschius; Edna Osser		1944	
"If (They Made Me a King)"	Tolchard Evans	Robert Hargreaves; Stanley J. Damerell	1950	with Mitchell Ayres & his Orchestra
"If (Gates)"	David A. Gates; Arranged by Don Costa		1971	with Don Costa Orchestra
"If I Could Almost Read Your Mind"	Ray Charles; Nick Perito		1970	
"If I Could Almost Read Your Mind"	Ray Charles; Nick Perito		1980	
"If I Could Be With You (One Hour Tonight)"	James P. Johnson	Henry Creamer	1956	with Como's Little Combo; First Released in 1971
"If I Loved You"	Richard Rodgers	Oscar Hammerstein II	1945	with Russ Case Orchestra; From the musical Carousel
"If I'm Lucky"	Joseph Myrow; Eddie Delange		1946	with Russ Case & his Orchestra; From the film If I'm Lucky
"If There is Someone Lovelier Than You"	Arthur Schwartz	Howard Dietz	1952	with Mitchell Ayres Orchestra
"If We Can't Be the Same Old Sweethearts"	James V. Monaco	Joseph McCarthy	1947	with Russ Case & his Orchestra
"If and When"	Joseph Myrow	Sammy Cahn	1958	with Mitchell Ayres Orchestra & Ray Charles Singers (not released)
"If You Were the Only Girl (in the World)"	Nat D. Ayer	Clifford Grey	1946	with Russ Case & his Orchestra
"If You Were Only Mine"	Isham Jones	Charles Newman	1950	with Mitchell Ayres & his Orchestra
"I Gotta Right To Sing the Blues"	Harold Arlen	Ted Koehler	1955	with Mitchell Ayres Orchestra & Chorus
"I Have You to Thank"	Jule Styne	Leo Robin	1957	with Mitchell Ayres Orchestra & Ray Charles Singers; Only appeared on the NBC-TV special Ruggles of Red Gap
"I Know"	Carl Stutz; Edith Lindeman		1959	with Mitchell Ayres Orchestra & Ray Charles Singers
"I Know What God Is"	John G. Bowen; Don Raye; Ned Freeman		1959	with Mitchell Ayres Orchestra & Ray Charles Singers
"(I Left My Heart) In San Francisco"	George Cory	Douglas Cross	1963	with Mitchell Ayres Orchestra
"I'll Always Love You"				
"I'll Be Home for Christmas"	Kim Gannon; Walter Kent; Buck Ram		1946	with Russ Case Orchestra & Chorus
"I'll Love Nobody Else But You"	Alfred Gary; Nick Mitchell		1953	with Hugo Winterhalter Orchestra & Chorus (not released)
"I'll Remember April"	Gene de Paul	Patricia Johnston; Don Raye	1962	with Mitchell Ayres Orchestra & Ray Charles Singers
"I Looked Back"	Larry Wagner	Jimmy Eaton	1967	with Nick Perito Orchestra & Ray Charles Singers
"I Love You"	Cole Porter		1944	Performed A Cappella with an unidentified mixed chorus From the stage musical Mexican Hayride
"(I Love You) Don't You Forget It"	Henry Mancini	Al Stillman	1963	with Mitchell Ayres Orchestra & Ray Charles Singers
"I'm Always Chasing Rainbows"	Chopin; Adaptation: Harry Carroll	Joseph McCarthy	1945	with Russ Case Orchestra & The Satisfiers from the film The Dolly Sisters
"I'm Always Chasing Rainbows"	Chopin; Adaptation: Harry Carroll	Joseph McCarthy	1946	with André Kostelanetz & his Orchestra
"I May Never Pass This Way Again"	Murray Wizel; Irving Melcher; Arranged by Jack Andrews		1958	with Mitchell Ayres Orchestra & Ray Charles Singers
"I'm Confessin' (That I Love You)"	Doc Daugherty; Ellis Reynolds	Al J. Neiburg	1944	with Lew Martin Orchestra
"I'm Dreaming of Hawaii"	Nick Perito	Dick Williams; Jennifer L. Perito	1987	with Nick Perito Orchestra
"I'm Gonna Love That Gal (Like She's Never Been Loved Before)"	Frances Ash		1945	with Russ Case Orchestra
"I'm Gonna Sit Right Down and Write Myself a Letter"	Fred E. Ahlert	Joe Young	1961	with Mitchell Ayres Orchestra featuring Guitar played by Tony Mottola Performed in a medley with two other songs
"In the Cool, Cool, Cool of the Evening"	Hoagy Carmichael	Johnny Mercer	1980	Part of Bing Crosby Medley
"In the Garden"	C. Austin Miles; Arranged by Ray Charles		1958	with Mitchell Ayres Orchestra & Ray Charles Singers
"In My Little Red Book"	Ray Bloch; Nat Simon; Al Stillman		1938	with the Ted Weems Orchestra featuring vocal whistling by Elmo Tanner
"In Our Hide-Away"	Irving Berlin		1962	with Sandy Stewart featuring instrumental and vocal backing from Mitchell Ayres Orchestra & Ray Charles Singers
"In the Still of the Night"	Cole Porter		1955	with Mitchell Ayres Orchestra & Ray Charles Singers
"In the Still of the Night"	Cole Porter		1972	for the NBC-TV special Cole Porter in Paris
"In These Crazy Times"	Sydney Lippman	Sylvia Dee	1968	with Nick Perito Orchestra & Ray Charles Singers
"I Really Don't Want to Know"	Don Robertson	Howard Barnes	1965	with Anita Kerr Quartet
"Is She the Only Girl in the World?"	Irving Berlin		1962	with Mitchell Ayres Orchestra
"The Island of Forgotten Lovers"	Dick Manning; Kay Twomey		1962	with Mitchell Ayres Orchestra & Ray Charles Singers
"It All Comes Back to Me Now"	Alex Kramer; Joan Whitney; Hy Zaret		1941	with the Ted Weems Orchestra
"It All Seems to Fall in Line"	Ben Weisman	Al Stillman	1973	
"It Could Happen to You"	Jimmy Van Heusen	Johnny Burke	1958	
"It Could Happen to You"	Jimmy Van Heusen	Johnny Burke	1980	
"It Gets Lonely in the White House"	Irving Berlin		1962	with Mitchell Ayres Orchestra featuring intro vocals by Ray Charles Singers
"It Had to Be You"	Isham Jones	Gus Kahn	1958	with Mitchell Ayres Orchestra
"It Happened in Monterey"	Mabel Wayne	William Rose	1955	with Mitchell Ayres Orchestra & Chorus
"I Think I Love You"	Tony Romeo		1970	with Nick Perito Orchestra
"I Think of You"	Francis Albert Lai	Rod McKuen	1971	with Don Costa Orchestra
"I Thought About You"	Ronald E. McGown; Arranged by Cam Mullins		1973	
"It's Been a Long, Long Time"	Jule Styne	Sammy Cahn	1956	with Como's Little Combo (not released)
"It's Beginning to Look a Lot Like Christmas"	Meredith Willson		1951	with The Fontane Sisters featuring instrumental backing from Mitchell Ayres Orchestra
"It's a Good Day"	Dave Barbour; Peggy Lee		1955	with Mitchell Ayres Orchestra & Ray Charles Singers
"It's a Good Day"	Dave Barbour; Peggy Lee		1970	with The Doodletown Pipers
"It's Impossible"	Canache Armando Manzanero	Spanish: Canache Armando Manzanero; English: Sid Wayne	1970	with Marty Manning Orchestra
"It's a Lovely Day Today"	Irving Berlin		1950	with The Fontane Sisters featuring instrumental backing from Mitchell Ayres Orchestra
"It's the Talk of the Town"	Jerry Livingston	Al J. Neiburg; Marty Symes	1944	with Paul Baron Orchestra featuring an unidentified Clarinet Solo
"It's the Talk of the Town"	Jerry Livingston	Al J. Neiburg; Marty Symes	1955	with Mitchell Ayres Orchestra
"It Was Such a Good Day"	Joe Brooks; Arranged by Cam Mullins		1973	(not released)
"I've Got a Feelin' I'm Fallin'"	Harry Link; Thomas "Fats" Waller	Billy Rose	1947	with The Satisfiers featuring instrumental backing from Russ Case Orchestra
"I've Got the World on a String"	Harold Arlen	Ted Koehler	1955	with Mitchell Ayres Orchestra
"I've Got You Under My Skin"	Cole Porter		1959	with Mitchell Ayres Orchestra
"I've Got You Under My Skin"	Cole Porter		1970	with Nick Perito Orchestra
"I've Grown Accustomed to Her Face"	Frederick Loewe	Alan Jay Lerner	1961	with Mitchell Ayres Orchestra featuring Guitar played by Tony Mottola performed in a medley with two other songs
"Ivy Rose"	Al Hoffman; Dick Manning; Arranged by Joe Reisman		1957	with Mitchell Ayres Orchestra & Ray Charles Singers
"I Wanna Be Around"	Sadie Vimmerstedt; Johnny Mercer		1963 (twice)	
"I Wanna Go Home (with You)"	Jack Joyce; Joe Candullo		1949	with The Fontane Sisters featuring instrumental backing from Mitchell Ayres Orchestra
"I Want to Give"	Enrique Raul de Jesus (aka J. Marcelo); J. Eduardo Ruben Carballo	English: Gene Nash	1973	
"I Want to Thank Your Folks"	Bennie Benjamin; George Weiss		1946	with Lloyd Shaffer Orchestra
"I Was Young and Foolish"	Dick Manning; Arranged by O. B. Masingill		1960	with Mitchell Ayres Orchestra & Chorus
"I Wonder Who's Kissing Her Now"	Joe Howard; Harold Orlob	Will Hough; Frank Adams	1939	with the Ted Weems Orchestra
"I Wonder Who's Kissing Her Now"	Joe Howard; Harold Orlob	Will Hough; Frank Adams	1947	with Lloyd Shaffer Orchestra; From the film I Wonder Who's Kissing Her Now
J
"Jason"	Debbie Hupp; Bob Morrison; Arranged by Nick Perito		1981	with Nick Perito Orchestra; Released in 1983
"Jingle Bells"	James Pierpont		1946	with Russ Case Orchestra & Chorus
"Joy to the World"	George F. Handel	Isaac Watts	1953	with Mitchell Ayres Orchestra & Chorus
"Juke Box Baby"	Joe Sherman	Noel Sherman	1956	with Mitchell Ayres Orchestra and Ray Charles Singers
"Just Born (to Be Your Baby)"	Luther Dixon; Billy Dawn Smith; Arranged by Joe Reisman		1957	with Mitchell Ayres Orchestra & Ray Charles Singers
"(Just One Way to Say) I Love You"	Irving Berlin		1949	with Mitchell Ayres Orchestra & Chorus from the Broadway musical Miss Liberty
"Just Out of Reach"	Virgil F. Stewart; Arranged by Mike Leech		1975	with The Nashville Sounds
K
"Keep It Gay"	Richard Rodgers	Oscar Hammerstein II	1953	with Henri René Orchestra & Chorus; From the musical Me and Juliet
"Kentucky Babe"	Adam Geibel	Richard Henry Buck	1946	with Russ Case Orchestra & The Satisfiers
"Kewpie Doll"	Sid Tepper; Roy C. Bennett; Arranged by Joe Reisman		1958	with Ray Charles featuring instrumental and vocal backings from Mitchell Ayres Orchestra & Ray Charles Singers
"Killing Me Softly with Her Song"	Charles Fox	Norman Gimbel	1973	
"Kiss Me and Kiss Me and Kiss Me"	Luciano Beretta	Italian: Arturo Casadei; English: Al Hoffman; Dick Manning	1959	with Mitchell Ayres Orchestra & Ray Charles Singers
"Ko Ko Mo (I Love You So)"	Forest Gene Wilson; Eunice Levy; Jake Porter; Arranged by Joe Reisman		1955	with Mitchell Ayres Orchestra & Ray Charles Singers
"Kol Nidrei"	Traditional Jewish Hymn in Hebrew		1953	with Mitchell Ayres Orchestra & Chorus
L
"Laroo Laroo Lilli Bolero"	Sidney Lippman	Sylvia Dee; Elizabeth Evelyn Moore	1947	with Russ Case & his Orchestra
"The Last Straw"	Lenny Stack		1952	with Betty Hutton featuring instrumental backing from Mitchell Ayres Orchestra (not released)
"Lazy Weather"	Peter De Rose	Jo Trent	1936	with the Ted Weems Orchestra featuring vocal whistling by Elmo Tanner
"Let a Smile Be Your Umbrella"	Sammy Fain	Irving Kahal; Francis Wheeler	1959	with Mitchell Ayres Orchestra
"Let It Be Love"	Ben Peters; Arranged by Cam Mullins		1975	with The Nashville Sounds
"Let Me Call You Baby Tonight"	Bob Duncan; Porter Jordan; Arranged by Mike Leech		1975	with The Nashville Sounds
"Let's Do It Again"	Jackie Trent (aka Yvonne J. Harvey); Peter Anthony "Tony" Hatch; Arranged by Cam Mullins		1975	with The Nashville Sounds
"Let's Go To Church"	Steve Allen		1950	with Mitchell Ayres Orchestra & Chorus
"Let's Take an Old-Fashioned Walk"	Irving Berlin		1949	with Mitchell Ayres Orchestra & Chorus; From the Broadway musical Miss Liberty
"Lies"	Harry Barris	George Springer	1952	with The Ramblers featuring instrumental backing from Hugo Winterhalter Orchestra
"Like Someone in Love"	Jimmy Van Heusen	Johnny Burke	1945	with Ted Steele Orchestra & The Satisfiers
"Like Someone in Love"	Jimmy Van Heusen	Johnny Burke	1958	with Mitchell Ayres Orchestra & Ray Charles Singers; Part of the "Letters" Medley
"Like Young"	André Previn	Paul Francis Webster	1960	with Mitchell Ayres Orchestra & Chorus
"Lili Marlene"	Norbert Schultze	German: Hans Leip; English: Tommie Connor	1944	Performed A Cappella with an unidentified mixed chorus
"Linda"	Jack Lawrence		1959	with Mitchell Ayres Orchestra
"The Little Drummer Boy"	Katherine Davis; Henry Onorati; Harry Simeone		1968	with the Ray Charles Singers
"Little Boat (O Barquinho)"	Ronaldo Boscoli	Buddy Kaye; Roberto Menescal	1965	with Nick Perito Orchestra & Ray Charles Singers; First Released in 2007
"Little Man You've Had a Busy Day"	Mabel Wayne	Maurice Sigler; Al Hoffman	1946	with The Satisfiers featuring instrumental backing from Russ Case Orchestra
"Little Man You've Had a Busy Day"	Mabel Wayne	Maurice Sigler; Al Hoffman	1958	with Mitchell Ayres Orchestra & Ray Charles Singers; Part of the "We Get Letters" Medley.
"Lollipops and Roses"	Tony Velona		1962	with Mitchell Ayres Orchestra
"Lonesome, That's All"	Lee S. Roberts; Ben J. Bradley		1952	with Mitchell Ayres & his Orchestra
"Long Ago (and Far Away)"	Jerome Kern	Ira Gershwin	1944	A Cappella with an unidentified mixed chorus From the Hollywood musical Cover Girl
"Long Life, Lots of Happiness"	Owen McGovern		1970	with Marty Manning Orchestra & unidentified background singers
"Look Out the Window (and See How I'm Standing in the Rain)"	Dave Mann	Bob Hilliard	1953	with Hugo Winterhalter Orchestra & Chorus
"Look to Your Heart"	Jimmy Van Heusen	Sammy Cahn	1968	with Nick Perito Orchestra
"The Lord's Prayer"	Albert Hay Malotte	Jesus Christ; Based on Matthew 6: 9-13 and Luke 11: 2–4 in Holy Bible	1949	with Choir and Organ directed by Mitchell Ayres
"The Lord's Prayer"	Albert Hay Malotte	Jesus Christ; Based on Matthew 6: 9-13 and Luke 11: 2–4 in Holy Bible	1959	with Robert Shaw Male Chorale & Mitchell Ayres Orchestra
"Love"	Gerard Kenny; Drey Shepperd		1980	
"Love Don't Care (Where It Grows!)"	Tupper Saussy; Arranged by Bill McElhiney		1973	with Bill McElhiney Orchestra
"Love in a Home"	Gene de Paul	Johnny Mercer	1968	with Nick Perito Orchestra & Ray Charles Singers
"Love Is a Christmas Rose"	Earl Shuman; Leon Carr		1967	
"Love Is Spreadin' over the World"	Neil Sedaka	Howard Greenfield	1970	
"Love Letters"	Victor Young	Edward Heyman	1945	with Lloyd Shaffer & his Orchestra from the film Love Letters
"Love Letters"	Victor Young	Edward Heyman	1958	with Mitchell Ayres Orchestra
"Love Makes the World Go 'Round"	Ollie Jones		1958	with Mitchell Ayres Orchestra & Ray Charles Singers
"Love Me or Leave Me"	Walter Donaldson	Gus Kahn	1947	with The Satisfiers featuring instrumental backing from Russ Case Orchestra
"Love Put a Song in My Heart"	Ben Peters; Arranged by William E. Justis		1975	with The Nashville Sounds
"Loving Her Was Easier"	Kris Kristofferson; Arranged by Cam Mullins		1975	with The Nashville Sounds
M
"Maderia"	Unknown		1955	with Mitchell Ayres Orchestra (not released)
"Magic Moments"	Burt Bacharach	Hal David	1957	with Mitchell Ayres Orchestra & Ray Charles Singers
"Make Love to Life"	James Stein; Arranged by Mike Leech		1975	with The Nashville Sounds
"Make Someone Happy"	Jule Styne	Betty Comden; Adolph Green	1960	with Mitchell Ayres Orchestra & Ray Charles Singers; From the Broadway musical Do Re Mi
"Making Love to You"	Nick Perito	Sammy Cahn	1987	with Nick Perito Orchestra
"Manhã de Carnaval"	Luiz Bonfá	Portuguese: Antonio Maria English:George David Weiss; Hugo Peretti; Luigi Creatore	1966	from Black Orpheus
"Mandolino"	Pietro Garinei; Sandro Giovannini	Italian: Sandro Giovannini; Pietro Garinei; English: Alex Kramer; Al Stillman	1959	with Mitchell Ayres Orchestra & Ray Charles Singers (not released)
"Mandolins in the Moonlight"	George Weiss; Aaron Schroeder		1958	with Mitchell Ayres Orchestra & Ray Charles Singers
"Marcheta"	Victor Schertzinger		1947	with Russ Case & his Orchestra
"Marchin' Along to the Blues"	Mel Green; Arranged by Joe Reisman		1957	with Mitchell Ayres Orchestra
"Maria"	Leonard Bernstein	Stephen Sondheim	1962	with Mitchell Ayres Orchestra & Ray Charles Singers
"Marie"	Unknown		1977 (Basic Track)	Overdubs Recorded in 1978 (not released)
"Marrying for Love"	Irving Berlin		1950	with Mitchell Ayres Orchestra
"Maybe"	Allan Flynn; Frank Madden		1952	duet with Eddie Fisher featuring instrumental backing from Mitchell Ayres Orchestra
"May I Never Love Again"	Jack Erickson; Sano Marco		1941	with the Ted Weems Orchestra
"May the Good Lord Bless and Keep You"	Meredith Willson		1958	
"Meditation"	Antonio Carlos Jobim	Portuguese: Newton Mendonça; English: Norman Gimbel	1966	with Nick Perito Orchestra & Ray Charles Singers
"Meet Me at the Altar"	Chuck Deal; Dan Deal		1965 (twice)	Nashville version with the Anita Kerr Quartet (not released).
"Meet Me at the Altar"	Chuck Deal; Dan Deal		1965 (twice)	New York version with Nick Perito Orchestra & Ray Charles Singers
"Me and My Shadow"	Dave Dreyer; Al Jolson	Billy Rose	1951	with Mitchell Ayres & his Orchestra
"Mi Casa, Su Casa (My House Is Your House)"	Al Hoffman; Dick Manning; Arranged by Joe Reisman		1957	with Mitchell Ayres Orchestra & Ray Charles Singers
"Michelle"	John Lennon; Paul McCartney; Arranged by Don Costa		1977	with Nick Perito Orchestra & Tony Mansell Singers; Alternate Take released in 1984
"Mood Indigo"	Barney Bigard; Duke Ellington	Mitchell Parish	1959	with Mitchell Ayres Orchestra
"Moonglow and Theme from Picnic"	Will Hudson; Irving Mills	Eddie DeLange	1962	with Mitchell Ayres Orchestra & Ray Charles Singers
"Moonglow and Theme from Picnic"	George Duning	Steve Allen	1962	with Mitchell Ayres Orchestra & Ray Charles Singers
"Moonlight Love"	Claude Debussy; Adaptation: Domenico Savino	Mitchell Parish	1956	with Mitchell Ayres Orchestra & Ray Charles Singers
"Moon River"	Henry Mancini	Johnny Mercer	1962	with Mitchell Ayres Orchestra & Ray Charles Singers
"Moon Talk"	Al Hoffman; Dick Manning		1958 (twice)	with Mitchell Ayres Orchestra & Ray Charles Male Chorale
"More"	Alex Alstone	Tom Glazer	1956	with Mitchell Ayres Orchestra & Ray Charles Singers
"More and More"	Jerome Kern	E. Y. Harburg	1944	with Lou Martin Orchestra; From the film Can't Help Singing
"More than Likely"	Jimmy Van Heusen	Sammy Cahn	1962	with Mitchell Ayres Orchestra
"More Than You Know"	Vincent Youmans	Billy Rose; Edward Eliscu	1946	with Russ Case & his Orchestra
"More Than You Know"	Vincent Youmans	Billy Rose; Edward Eliscu	1951	with Mitchell Ayres Orchestra
"The Most Beautiful Girl"	Rory Bourke; Billy Sherrill; Norro Wilson		1974	
"Mother Dear, O Pray for Me"	I. B. Woodbury		1950	with St. Cathedral Boys Choir featuring Organ played by Charles Marie Courboin
"My Blue Heaven"	Walter Donaldson	George Whiting	1946	with Russ Case Orchestra & The Satisfiers; First Released in 1984
"My Child"	Adaptation: Cy Coben; Jerry Livingston; Based on a Piano Concerto composed by Chopin	Cy Coben; Jerry Livingston	1949	with Mitchell Ayres & his Orchestra (not released)
"My Coloring Book"	John Kander	Fred Ebb	1963	
"My Cup Runneth Over"	Harvey Schmidt	Tom Jones	1968	with Nick Perito Orchestra & Ray Charles Singers
"My Favorite Things"	Richard Rodgers	Oscar Hammerstein II	1962	with Mitchell Ayres Orchestra & Ray Charles Singers
"My Funny Valentine"	Richard Rodgers	Lorenz Hart	1955	with Mitchell Ayres Orchestra; From the Hollywood musical Gentlemen Marry Brunettes
"My Heart Stood Still"	Richard Rodgers	Lorenz Hart	1948	with Robert Tucker Chorus recorded for the film Words & Music
"My Heart Stood Still"	Richard Rodgers	Lorenz Hart	1952	with Mitchell Ayres Orchestra & Chorus
"My Heart Stood Still"	Richard Rodgers	Lorenz Hart	1987	with Nick Perito Orchestra featuring Trombone Solo by Chauncey Welch
"My Kind of Girl"	Leslie Bricusse; Arranged by Nick Perito		1977	with Nick Perito Orchestra & Tony Mansell Singers
"My Little Baby"	Joe Shapiro; Lou Stallman; Arranged by Joe Reisman		1957	with Mitchell Ayres Orchestra & Chorus
"My Love and Devotion"	Harold Fields, Howard Barnes and Joseph Roncoroni (credited as Milton Carson)		1952	with Mitchell Ayres & his Orchestra
"My Melancholy Baby"	Ernie Burnett	George A. Norton; Maybelle E. Watson	1947	with Russ Case & his Orchestra
"My One and Only Heart"	Robert Allen	Al Stillman	1953	with Hugo Winterhalter Orchestra
"My Own Peculiar Way"	Willie Nelson		1965	
N
"Nearer, My God to Thee"	Lowell Mason	Sarah F. Adams	1953	with Mitchell Ayres Orchestra & Ray Charles Singers
"A Nightingale Sang in Berkeley Square"	Manning Sherwin	Eric Maschwitz	1977	with Nick Perito Orchestra & Tony Mansell Singers
"Nobody"	Bert Williams	Alex Rogers	1952	with Mitchell Ayres Orchestra (not released)
"Nobody"	Bert Williams	Alex Rogers	1955	with Mitchell Ayres Orchestra; From the film The Seven Little Foys
"Nobody But You"	Dion O'Brien		1967	Released in 1969
"Noodlin' Rag"	Robert Allen	Allen Roberts	1952	with The Fontane Sisters featuring instrumental backing from Mitchell Ayres Orchestra
"No Other Love"	Richard Rodgers	Oscar Hammerstein II	1953	with Henri René Orchestra & Chorus; From the stage musical Me & Juliet
"Not While I'm Around"	Stephen Sondheim; Arranged by Byron Olsen		1980	
"No Well on Earth"	Dave Mann	Bob Hilliard	1958	with Mitchell Ayres Orchestra
"N'yot N'yow" (The Pussycat Song)	Dick Manning		1948	with The Fontane Sisters and 4 additional backing singers featuring ukulele played by Jack Lathrope
O
"O Come All Ye Faithful"	Latin Hymn	Translated by Frederick Oakeley	1946	with Organ & Choir conducted by Russ Case
"Oh Marie"	Original Italian melody adapted by Ray Charles; Nick Perito	Italian Adaptation: Eduardo DiCapua	1966	with Nick Perito Orchestra and the Allesandro Allessandroni Singers
"Oh Marie"	Original Italian melody adapted by Ray Charles; Nick Perito	Italian Adaptation: Eduardo DiCapua	1980	with Nick Perito Orchestra and Ray Charles Singers
"O Holy Night"	Adolphe Charles Adam	French: Placide Cappeau de Roquemaure; English: John Sullivan Dwight	1959	with Mitchell Ayres Orchestra and Ray Charles Singers
"O Holy Night"	Adolphe Charles Adam	French: Placide Cappeau de Roquemaure; English: John Sullivan Dwight	1968	with Nick Perito Orchestra & Ray Charles Singers
"Oh! How I Miss You Tonight"	Joseph A. Burke; Benny Davis; Mark Fisher		1947	with Russ Case & his Orchestra
"O Little Town of Bethlehem"	Phillips Brooks; Lewis H. Redner		1946	with Organ & Choir conducted by Russ Case
"Ollie Ollie Out's in Free"	Clarence Freed; Helen White		1941	with the Ted Weems Orchestra
"O Marenariello"	Original Italian melody adapted by Ray Charles & Nick Perito	adaptation: Salvatore Gambardella	1966	with the Allesandro Allessandroni Singers and Nick Perito Orchestra
"O Marenariello"	Original Italian melody adapted by Ray Charles & Nick Perito	adaptation: Salvatore Gambardella	1970	with The Doodletown Pipers and Nick Perito Orchestra
"On the Island of Catalina"	Ted Weems; Moe Jaffe; John O'Brien		1939	with Ted Weems & his Orchestra
"Once I Loved (Amor e Paz)"	Antonio Carlos Jobim	Vinicius De Moraes; English: Ray Gilbert	1966	with Nick Perito Orchestra & Ray Charles Singers
"Once Upon a Time"	Charles Strouse	Lee Adams	1962	with Mitchell Ayres Orchestra; From the broadway musical All American
"One for My Baby (and One More for the Road)"	Harold Arlen	Johnny Mercer	1955	with Mitchell Ayres Orchestra; From the Hollywood musical Young at Heart
"One Little Candle"	George Mysels	Joseph Malloy Roach	1952	with Mitchell Ayres Orchestra & Chorus
"One More Mountain"	Eddie Snyder; Paul Vance		1963	with Mitchell Ayres Orchestra
"One More Time"	Ray Henderson	B. G. DeSylva; Lew Brown	1954	with the Ames Brothers featuring instrumental backing from Mitchell Ayres Orchestra (not released)
"One More Vote"	Eddie Delange; Joseph Myrow		1946	with Russ Case Orchestra & The Satisfiers; From the film If I'm Lucky
"Only One"	Sunny Skylar; Tom Glazer; Andrew Ackers; Arranged by Joe Lipman		1958	with Mitchell Ayres Orchestra & Ray Charles Singers
"On the Outgoing Tide"	Mabel Wayne	Lew Brown	1950	with Mitchell Ayres & his Orchestra
"Onward, Christian Soldiers"	Arthur S. Sullivan	Sabine Baring-Gould	1953	with Hugo Winterhalter Orchestra & Chorus
"Oowee, Oowee"	Bonita Ann Andre; Ronald Lawrence; Sydney Robin; Ramona Marie Witry; Arranged by Anita Kerr		1965	with the Anita Kerr Quartet
"The Other Man's Grass Is Always Greener"	Tony Hatch; Jackie Trent; Arranged by Nick Perito		1977	with Nick Perito Orchestra & Tony Mansell Singers
"Over the Rainbow"	Harold Arlen	E. Y. Harburg	1952	with Sally Sweetland featuring instrumental and vocal backing from Mitchell Ayres Orchestra & Chorus
P
"Papa Loves Mambo"	Bix Reichner; Al Hoffman; Dick Manning; Arranged by Joe Reisman		1954	with Mitchell Ayres Orchestra & Ray Charles Singers
"Pa-paya Mama"	Norman Gimbel; Larry Coleman; George Sandler		1953	with Hugo Winterhalter Orchestra & The Ramblers
"Pardon My English (Samba Torto)"	Antonio Carlos Jobim	Aloysio De Oliveira; English: Ray Gilbert	1965	with Ray Charles Singers; First Released in 2007
"Patricia"	Benny Davis		1950	with Mitchell Ayres Orchestra & Chorus
"Pennies from Heaven"	Arthur Johnston	Johnny Burke	1980	Part of Bing Crosby Medley
"People"	Jule Styne	Bob Merrill	1968	with Nick Perito Orchestra & Tony Mansell Singers (not released)
"Perhaps, Perhaps, Perhaps"	Osvaldo Farrés	Spanish: Osvaldo Farrés; English: Joe Davis	1965	with Nick Perito Orchestra & Ray Charles Singers; First Released in 2007
"Pianissimo"	Bennie Benjamin; George Weiss		1947	with Russ Case & his Orchestra
"Picture Me Without You"	Jimmy McHugh	Ted Koehler	1936	with Ted Weems Orchestra
"Pigtails and Freckles"	Irving Berlin	Irving Berlin	1962	
"Play Me a Hurtin' Tune"	Sidney Lippman	Sylvia Dee	1952	with The Fontane Sisters featuring instrumental backing from Mitchell Ayres Orchestra
"Please Believe Me"	Bob Merrill	Bee Walker	1949	with Mitchell Ayres & his Orchestra; Introduced on Perry's NBC Chesterfield Supper Club
"Please, Mr. Sun"	Ray Getzov	Sid Frank	1951	with Mitchell Ayres & his Orchestra
"A Portrait of My Love"	Cyril Ornadel	David West	1961	with Mitchell Ayres & his Orchestra featuring Guitar played by Tony Mottola performed in a medley with two other songs
"Prayer for Peace"	Nick Acquaviva	English: Norman Gimbel	1958	with Mitchell Ayres Orchestra & Ray Charles Singers
"Prayer of Thanksgiving"	Edward Kremser	German: Edward Kremser; English Translation by Theodore Baker	1950	with Mitchell Ayres Mixed Chorus featuring Organ played by Charles Marie Courboin
"Prisoner of Love"	Russ Columbo; Clarence Gaskill	Leo Robin	1945	with Russ Case & his Orchestra
"Prisoner of Love"	Russ Columbo; Clarence Gaskill	Leo Robin	1946	with André Kostelanetz & his Orchestra
"Prisoner of Love"	Russ Columbo; Clarence Gaskill	Leo Robin	1970	with The Doodletown Pipers
"Put Your Hand in the Hand"	Gene MacLellan		1971	with Ray Charles Singers
Q
"Quiet Nights of Quiet Stars (Corcovado)"	Antonio Carlos Jobim	English: Buddy Kaye; Gene Lees	1965	with Nick Perito Orchestra & Ray Charles Singers; Released in 1966
R
"Rainbow on the River"	Louis Alter	Paul Francis Webster	1936	with the Ted Weems Orchestra featuring vocal whistling by Elmo Tanner
"Raindrops Keep Fallin' on My Head"	Burt Bacharach	Hal David	1970	with Nick Perito Chorus
"Rambling Rose"	Joseph Burke	Joseph Allan McCarthy Jr.	1947	with The Satisfiers featuring instrumental backing from Russ Case Orchestra
"Reach Out Your Hand"	Billy Sherrill; Tammy Wynette		1973	(not released)
"Red Sails in the Sunset"	Hugh Williams (aka Will Grosz)	Jimmy Kennedy	1958	with Mitchell Ayres Orchestra and Ray Charles Singers
"Regrets"	Barbara Wyrick; Arranged by John Abbott		1980	
"Ribbons and Roses"	Samuel Lewis; George W. Meyer; Pete Wending		1938	with Ted Weems & his Orchestra song is also known as "Robins and Roses"
"Roamin' through the Countryside"	Kendal Hayes; Arranged by Anita Kerr		1965	with the Anita Kerr Quartet (not released)
"Rock of Ages"	Thomas Hastings	Augustus Toplady	1950	with Mitchell Ayres Male Chorus featuring Organ played by Charles Marie Courboin
"Rollin' Stone"	Irving Gordon		1951	with The Fontane Sisters featuring instrumental and vocal backing by Mitchell Ayres Orchestra and Chorus
"The Rosary"	Ethelbert Nevin; Robert Cameron Rogers		1950	with Mitchell Ayres Women's Choir featuring Organ played by Charles Marie Courboin
"Rose of the Rockies"	Charles Kenny; Nick Kenny; Allie Wrubel		1941	with Elmo Tanner featuring instrumental backing from the Ted Weems Orchestra
"The Rose Tattoo"	Harry Warren	Jack Brooks	1955	with Mitchell Ayres & his Orchestra; From the film The Rose Tattoo
"Rosemary Blue"	Neil Sedaka	Howard Greenfield	1978	with Nick Perito Orchestra (not released)
"Roses of Picardy"	Haydn Wood	Frederick E. Weatherley	1947	with Russ Case & his Orchestra
"Round and Round"	Joe Shapiro; Lou Stallman; Arranged by Ray Charles & Joe Reisman		1957	with Mitchell Ayres Orchestra and Ray Charles Singers
"Route 66"	Bobby Troup; Arranged by Jack Andrews & Joe Lipman		1959	with Mitchell Ayres Orchestra
"The Ruby and The Pearl"	Jay Livingston	Ray Evans	1952	with Mitchell Ayres Orchestra; Only featured in the film Thunder in the East until 1955, appearing on the greatest hits album RCA Victor Platter Party with various artists
"Rudolph the Red-Nosed Reindeer"	Johnny Marks		1953	with Mitchell Ayres Orchestra & Chorus
"Rudolph the Red-Nosed Reindeer"	Johnny Marks		1959	with Mitchell Ayres Orchestra & Ray Charles Singers
S
"Sad and Lonely"	Nick Acquaviva	Ted Varnick	1957	with Mitchell Ayres Orchestra & Ray Charles Singers (not released)
"Santa Claus is Coming to Town"	J. Fred Coots; Haven Gillespie		1946	with The Satisfiers featuring instrumental backing from Russ Case Orchestra
"Santa Claus is Coming to Town"	J. Fred Coots; Haven Gillespie		1959	with Mitchell Ayres Orchestra & Ray Charles Singers
"Santa Lucia"	Teodoro Cottrau adaptation: Nick Perito	adaptation: Ray Charles	1966	with the Allesandro Allessandroni Singers
"Save Me the Dance"	Luciano Angeleri	Ervin M. Drake	1980	
"Say It Isn't So"	Irving Berlin		1956	with Mitchell Ayres Orchestra (not released)
"Say It Isn't So"	Irving Berlin		1961	with Mitchell Ayres Orchestra featuring Guitar played by Tony Mottola performed as a medley with two other songs
"Say You're Mine Again"	Charles Nathan	Dave Heisler	1953	with Hugo Winterhalter Orchestra & The Ramblers
"Scarlet Ribbons"	Evelyn Danzig	Jack Segal	1958	
"Seattle"	Hugo Montenegro; Jack Keller; Ernie Sheldon		1968	Released in June 1969
"The Second Time"	Francis Albert Lai	Tim Rice	1982	with Nick Perito Orchestra; Released in 1983
"Secretly"	Al Kaufman; Marty Symes		1943	with a 10-voice Mixed Choir (not released)
"Send In the Clowns"	Stephen Sondheim		1980	
"The Shadow of Your Smile"	Johnny Mandel	Paul Francis Webster	1966	with Nick Perito Orchestra & Ray Charles Singers
"She's a Lady"	Cy Coben		1950	with Betty Hutton featuring instrumental backing from Mitchell Ayres Orchestra
"Silent Night"	Franz Gruber; Joseph Mohr		1946	with Organ & Choir conducted by Russ Case
"Silver Bells"	Jay Livingston	Ray Evans	1968	with The Ray Charles Singers
"Simple and Sweet"	Sammy Fain	Irving Kahal	1938	with Ted Weems Orchestra featuring vocal whistling by Elmo Tanner
"Sing"	Joe Raposo; Arranged by Bergen White		1973	
"Sing Along with Me"	Nick Perito	Dee Williams	1987	with Nick Perito Orchestra
"Slightly out of Tune (Desafinado)"	Antonio Carlos Jobim	Portuguese: Newton Mendonça; English: Jon Hendricks and Jesse Cavanaugh (aka Howie Richmond)	1963	with Mitchell Ayres Orchestra
"Smile"	Charles Chaplin	Geoffrey Parsons; John Turner	1961	with Mitchell Ayres & his Orchestra featuring Guitar played by Tony Mottola performed as a medley with two other songs
"Smile"	Charles Chaplin	Geoffrey Parsons; John Turner	1977	with Nick Perito Orchestra & Tony Mansell Singers
"Snowbird"	Gene MacLellan		1970	
"So Far"	Richard Rodgers	Oscar Hammerstein II	1947	with Russ Case & his Orchestra; From the stage musical Allegro
"So in Love"	Cole Porter		1961	with Mitchell Ayres Orchestra featuring Guitar played by Tony Mottola performed as a medley with two other songs
"So in Love"	Cole Porter		1972	
"So It Goes"	John Barry Mason; Alec Gould; Michael Heath Johnson; Arranged by Byron Olsen		1982	with Nick Perito Orchestra; Released in 1983
"Somebody Cares"	Johnny Robba; Frank Reardon; Ernest G. Schweikert		1962	with Mitchell Ayres Orchestra
"Somebody Makes It So"	Paul Vance; Eddie Snyder		1967	with Nick Perito Orchestra & Ray Charles Singers
"Somebody Up There Likes Me"	Bronislau Kaper	Sammy Cahn	1956	with Mitchell Ayres Orchestra & Ray Charles Singers; From the film Somebody Up There Likes Me
"Somebody Somewhere"	Frank Loesser		1968	with the Ray Charles Singers (not released)
"Some Children See Him"	Wihla Hutson	Alfred Burt	1968	with the Ray Charles Singers (not released)
"Someday I'll Find You"	Noël Coward; Arranged by Nick Perito		1977	with Nick Perito Orchestra & Tony Mansell Singers
"Some Enchanted Evening"	Richard Rodgers	Oscar Hammerstein II	1949	with Mitchell Ayres Orchestra
"Someone is Waiting"	Richard Ahlert; Ettore Stratta		1980	
"Something"	George Harrison		1970	
"Sonata"	Alex Alstone	Ervin Drake Jimmy Shirl	1946	with Lloyd Shaffer Orchestra
"The Song of Songs"	Harold Vickers	French: Maurice Vancaire; English: Clarence Lucas	1947	with Lloyd Shaffer Orchestra
"The Songs I Love"	Jimmy Van Heusen	Sammy Cahn	1963	
"South of the Border"	Michael Carr; Jimmy Kennedy		1957	with Como's Little Combo
"Souvenir d'Italie"	Lelio Luttazzi	Italian: Giulio Scarnicca; Renzo Tarabusi; English: Carl Sigman	1966	with the Allesandro Allessandroni Singers
"Sow the Seeds of Happiness"	Jack Keller; Noel Sherman		1958	with Mitchell Ayres Orchestra & Ray Charles Singers (not released)
"St. Louis Blues"	W. C. Handy; Arranged by Jack Andrews & Joe Lipman		1959	with Mitchell Ayres Orchestra
"Stand Beside Me"	Tompall Glaser		1965	
"Stay with Me"	Nick Perito	Ray Charles	1966	with Nick Perito Orchestra & Ray Charles Singers
"A Still Small Voice"	Ben Weisman	Al Stillman	1958	
"Stop! And Think It Over"	Roy C. Bennett; Sid Tepper		1967	with Ray Charles Singers
"The Story of the First Christmas"	Traditional Christmas Story Medley adapted by John A. Richards		1950	with Mitchell Ayres Orchestra & Chorus
"The Story of the First Christmas"	Traditional Christmas Story Medley adapted by John A. Richards		1959	with Mitchell Ayres Orchestra & Ray Charles Singers
"Summer Me, Winter Me"	Michel Legrand	Marilyn and Alan Bergman	1969	(not released)
"Summertime"	George Gershwin	Ira Gershwin; Du Bose Heyward	1952	with Sally Sweetland featuring instrumental backing from Mitchell Ayres Orchestra
"Summer Wind"	Henry Mayer	Danish: Hans Bradtke; English: Johnny Mercer	1965	with the Anita Kerr Quartet
"Sunrise, Sunset"	Jerry Bock	Sheldon Harnick	1968	with Nick Perito Orchestra & Ray Charles Singers
"Sunshine Wine"	Cindy Walker		1968	Released in June 1969
"Surrender"	Bennie Benjamin; George Weiss		1946	with Russ Case & his Orchestra
"Sweet Adorable You"	Thomas Baker Knight		1965	
"Sweet Leilani"	Harry Owens		1980	Performed by the Ray Charles Singers; Part of Bing Crosby Medley
"The Sweetest Sounds"	Richard Rodgers		1962	with Mitchell Ayres Orchestra
"Swingin' on a Star"	Jimmy Van Heusen	Johnny Burke	1980	Part of Bing Crosby Medley
T
"Take a Look at Me"	Ronald E. McCown; Arranged by Cam Mullins		1973	(not released)
"Take Me Home"	Michelle Aller; Robert Esty; Arranged by Cam Mullins		1973	(not released)
"Talk of the Town"	Chester Conn	Gus Kahn	1955	with Mitchell Ayres Orchestra (not released)
"Tell Her of My Love, Paloma"	Unknown		1958	with Mitchell Ayres Orchestra & Ray Charles Singers (not released)
"Temptation"	Nacio Herb Brown	Arthur Freed	1945 (twice)	Both 1945 versions with Ted Steele Orchestra; February 1945 version with The Satisfiers
"Temptation"	Nacio Herb Brown	Arthur Freed	1974	with the Ray Charles Singers
"Thank Heaven for Little Girls"	Frederick Loewe	Alan Jay Lerner	1961	with Mitchell Ayres Orchestra featuring Guitar played by Tony Mottola performed in a medley with two other songs
"That Ain't All"	John D. Loudermilk		1965	
"That Christmas Feeling"	Bennie Benjamin; George Weiss		1946	with Russ Case & his Orchestra
"That Old Gang of Mine"	Ray Henderson	Mort Dixon; Billy Rose	1939	with the Ted Weems Orchestra
"That Old Gang of Mine"	Ray Henderson	Mort Dixon; Billy Rose	1951	with Mitchell Ayres & his Orchestra
"That's All this Old World Needs"	Bob Tubert; Demetriss (Tubert) Tapp		1967 (twice)	Nashville version released in June 1969; New York version not released
"That's the Beginning of the End"	Alex Kramer; Joan Whitney		1946	with Lloyd Shaffer Orchestra
"That's What Friends Are For"	Burt Bacharach	Carole Bayer Sager	1987	with Nick Perito Orchestra
"That's Where I Came In"	Peter DeRose	Charles Tobias	1946	with Lloyd Shaffer Orchestra
"Then You Can Tell Me Goodbye"	John D. Loudermilk; Arranged by Mike Leech		1975	with The Nashville Sounds
"There Is No Christmas Like a Home Christmas"	Carl Sigman; Mickey J. Addy		1950	with Mitchell Ayres Orchestra & Chorus
"There Is No Christmas Like a Home Christmas"	Carl Sigman; Mickey J. Addy		1968	with Ray Charles Singers
"There'll Never Be Another Night Like This"	David Reilly; Anthony Bygraves		1980	
"There'll Soon Be a Rainbow"	Henry Nemo; David Saxon		1943	Performed A Cappella with a 10-voice mixed choir
"There Never Was a Night So Beautiful"	John Rox		1954	with Hugo Winterhalter & his Orchestra
"There's a Big Blue Cloud (Next to Heaven)"	Ervin Drake; Hans Lengsfelder; Paul James McGrane		1951	with Mitchell Ayres & his Orchestra
"There's a Kind of Hush"	David Leslie Reed; Geoff Stevens; Arranged by Nick Perito		1977	with Nick Perito Orchestra & Tony Mansell Singers
"There's No Boat Like a Rowboat"	Irving Gordon		1951	with The Fontane Sisters featuring instrumental backing from Mitchell Ayres Orchestra
"They Say It's Wonderful"	Irving Berlin		1946	with Russ Case & his Orchestra; From the musical Annie Get Your Gun
"The Things I Didn't Do"	Fred Jay; Ira Kosloff; Irving Reid		1954	with Mitchell Ayres Orchestra & Ray Charles Singers
"This is a Great Country"	Irving Berlin	Irving Berlin	1962	
"This is All I Ask"	Gordon Jenkins		1963	
"This Nearly Was Mine"	Richard Rodgers	Oscar Hammerstein II	1961	with Mitchell Ayres Orchestra featuring Guitar played by Tony Mottola performed in a medley with two other songs
"Tie a Yellow Ribbon Round the Ole Oak Tree"	L. Russell Brown	Irwin Levine	1973	
"Till the End of Time"	Frédéric Chopin; Adaptation: Buddy Kaye; Ted Mossman	Buddy Kaye; Ted Mossman	1945	with Russell Case Orchestra
"Tina Marie"	Bob Merrill		1955	with Mitchell Ayres Orchestra & Ray Charles Singers
"Together Forever"	Harvey Schmidt	Tom Jones	1968	with the Ray Charles Singers also appears on the album Seattle
"To Know You (Is to Love You)"	Robert Allen	Allan Roberts	1952	with Betty Hutton featuring instrumental backing from Mitchell Ayres Orchestra (not released)
"To Know You (Is to Love You)"	Robert Allen	Allan Roberts	1952	with The Fontane Sisters featuring instrumental backing from Mitchell Ayres Orchestra
"To Know You (Is to Love You)"	Robert Allen	Allan Roberts	1959	with Ray Charles featuring instrumental backing from Mitchell Ayres Orchestra
"Tomboy"	Joe Farrell; Jim Conway		1959	with Mitchell Ayres Orchestra & Ray Charles Singers
"Tonight I Celebrate My Love For You"	Michael Masser	Gerry Goffin	1987	with Nick Perito Orchestra
"Too-ra-loo-ra-loo-ral"	James Royce Shannon		1980	Part of Bing Crosby Medley
"Too Young"	Sydney Lippman	Sylvia Dee	1960	with Mitchell Ayres Orchestra & Chorus
"Too Young to Go Steady"	Jimmy McHugh	Harold Adamson	1960	with Mitchell Ayres Orchestra & Chorus
"Toselli's Serenade (Dreams and Memories)"	Enrico Toselli	English: Carl Sigman	1966	with the Allesandro Allessandroni Singers
"Toyland"	Victor Herbert; Arranged & Adapted by Nick Perito		1968	with the Ray Charles Singers
"Traveling Down a Lonely Road" (Love theme from La Strada)	Nino Rinaldi Rota; Michele Galderi	Italian: Nino Rinaldi Rota; Michele Galderi; English: Don Raye	1966	with the Allesandro Allessandroni Singers
"Trees"	Oscar Rasbach	Joyce Kilmer	1955	with Mitchell Ayres Orchestra & Ray Charles Singers (not released)
"Trouble Comes"	Jack Segal; Marvin Fisher		1958	with Mitchell Ayres Orchestra & Ray Charles Singers (not released)
"(Trouble Ends) Out Where the Blues Begins"	Cliff Friend		1936	with Ted Weems Orchestra
"Try a Little Tenderness"	James Campbell; Reginald Connelly; Harry M. Woods		1956	with Mitchell Ayres Orchestra; First Released in 1993 on the CD compilation Yesterday & Today – A Celebration in Song
"Try to Remember"	Harvey Schmidt	Tom Jones	1968	with Nick Perito Orchestra & Ray Charles Singers
"Tulips and Heather"	Harold Fields, Howard Barnes and Joseph Roncoroni (credited as Milton Carson)		1951	with Mitchell Ayres Orchestra & Ray Charles Singers
"Tumbling Tumbleweeds"	Bob Nolan		1950	with the Western-Ayres (a Country music section of the Mitchell Ayres Orchestra) featuring vocal backing from Sons of the Pioneers
"Turnaround"	Alan Green; Harry Belafonte; Malvina Reynolds		1968	with the Ray Charles Singers also appears on the album Seattle
"Turn Around"	Henry Mayer	Al Stillman	1970	(not released)
"'Twas the Night Before Christmas"	Ray Charles	Clement Clarke Moore (original poem)	1953	with Mitchell Ayres String Ensemble
"The Twelve Days of Christmas"	Traditional Christmas Song in the Public Domain		1953	with Mitchell Ayres Orchestra & Chorus
"Twilight on the Trail"	Louis Alter	Sidney D. Mitchell	1958	with Mitchell Ayres Orchestra & Ray Charles Singers
"Two Blind Loves"	Harold Arlen	E. Y. Harburg	1939	with Ted Weems Orchestra; From the film Marx Bros. At the Circus
"Two Lost Souls"	Richard Adler	Jerry Ross	1955	with Jaye P. Morgan featuring instrumental backing from Mitchell Ayres Orchestra
"Two Loves Have I"	Vincent Scotto	English: Jack Murray & Barry Trivers; French: Georges Koger & Henri Varna	1947	with Russ Case & his Orchestra
U
"Unchained Melody"	Alex North; Hy Zaret		1956	with Mitchell Ayres Orchestra; First Released in 1993 on the CD compilation Yesterday & Today – A Celebration in Song
"Un giorno dopo l'altro (One Day is Like Another)"	Luigi Tenco	Earl S. Shuman	1966	with the Allesandro Allessandroni Singers
"Until Today"	J. Fred Coots; Oscar Levant	Benny Davis	1936	with Ted Weems Orchestra
V
"Vaya Con Dios"	Inez James; Buddy Pepper; Larry Russell		1958	with Mitchell Ayres Orchestra & Ray Charles Singers; Part of the "Dear Perry" Medley
"The Very Thought of You"	Ray Noble; Arranged by Don Costa		1977	with Nick Perito Orchestra & Tony Mansell Singers
W
"Walk Right Back"	Sonny Curtis		1973	
"Wanted"	Jack Fulton; Lois Steele		1953	with Hugo Winterhalter Orchestra & Chorus
"Watchin' the Trains Go By"	Tot Seymour; Al Goodhart		1950	with Mitchell Ayres Orchestra & Chorus
"Watermelon Weather"	Hoagy Carmichael	Paul Francis Webster	1952	with Eddie Fisher featuring instrumental backing from Mitchell Ayres Orchestra
"The Way We Were"	Marvin Hamlisch	Marilyn & Alan Bergman	1974	
"The Way You Look Tonight"	Jerome Kern	Dorothy Fields	1961	with Mitchell Ayres Orchestra featuring Guitar played by Tony Mottola performed in a medley with two other songs
"Weave Me the Sunshine"	Peter Yarrow		1974	with the Ray Charles Singers
"We Kiss in a Shadow"	Richard Rodgers	Oscar Hammerstein II	1951	with Mitchell Ayres & his Orchestra
"Welcome Home"	unknown		1973	(not released)
"We'll Meet Again"	Albert R. Parker	Hugh Charles	1977	with Nick Perito Orchestra & Tony Mansell Singers
"We've Only Just Begun"	Roger Nichols	Paul Williams	1970	
"What Am I Gonna Do About You?"	Jule Styne	Sammy Cahn	1946	with Lloyd Shaffer Orchestra
"What Kind of Fool Am I?"	Leslie Bricusse; Anthony Newley		1963	
"What'll I Do?"	Irving Berlin		1947	with Russ Case & his Orchestra
"What Love Is Made Of"	Paul Vance; Jack Segal; Eddie Snyder		1967	with the Ray Charles Singers
"What More Is There to Say?	Al Frisch	Robert Mellin	1952	with Mitchell Ayres Orchestra (not released)
"What's New?"	Bob Haggart	Johnny Burke	1962	with Mitchell Ayres Orchestra
"What's One More Time?"	Richard Leigh; Arranged by Byron Olsen		1982	with Nick Perito Orchestra; Released in 1983
"When"	George Fischoff; Arranged by Byron Olsen		1980	
"When Day is Done"	Robert Katscher	German: Robert Katscher; English: Buddy DeSylva	1947	with Russ Case & his Orchestra
"When Hearts Are Young"	Sigmund Romberg; Al Goodman	Cyrus Wood	1960	with Mitchell Ayres Orchestra & Chorus
"When I Fall in Love"	Victor Young	Edward Heyman	1958	with Mitchell Ayres Orchestra
"When I Lost You"	Irving Berlin		1963	
"When I Need You"	Albert Hammond	Carole Bayer Sager	1977	with Nick Perito Orchestra
"When I Wanted You"	Gino Cuncio; Arranged by Gerald Alters & Stanley Schwartz		1978	with Nick Perito Orchestra
"When Is Sometime?"	Jimmy Van Heusen	Johnny Burke	1947	with Russ Case & his Orchestra; From the 1949 film A Connecticut Yankee in King Arthur's Court
"When She Smiles"	Jerry Liliendahl		1980	
"When Tonight Is Just a Memory"	Bennie Benjamin; George Weiss		1947	with Helen Carroll and the Satisfiers featuring instrumental backing from Lloyd Shaffer Orchestra
"When You and I Were Young, Maggie"	J. A. Butterfield; Geo. W. Johnson; Arranged by O. B. Masingill		1960	with Mitchell Ayres Orchestra & Chorus
"When You Come to the End of the Day"	Frank C. Westphal	Gus Kahn	1952	with Mitchell Ayres & his Orchestra; First Released in 1955 on the greatest hits album RCA Victor Platter Party, with various artists
"When You Come to the End of the Day"	Frank C. Westphal	Gus Kahn	1958	with Mitchell Ayres & his Orchestra
"When You Were Sweet Sixteen"	James Thornton		1947	with The Satisfiers features instrumental backing from Lloyd Shaffer Orchestra from the film The Great John L.
"When Your Hair Has Turned to Silver (I Will Love You Just the Same)"	Peter De Rose	Charles Tobias	1947	with Russ Case & his Orchestra
"When You're Away"	Victor Herbert	Henry Blossom	1955	with Mitchell Ayres Orchestra & Ray Charles Singers (not released)
"When You're in Love"	Gene de Paul	Johnny Mercer	1968	with Nick Perito Orchestra & Ray Charles Singers
"When You're Smiling"	Larry Shay; Mark Fisher; Joe Goodwin		1947	with The Satisfiers featuring instrumental backing from Russ Case & his Orchestra
"Where Do I Begin?"	Francis Lai	Carl Sigman	1971	with the Ray Charles Singers
"Where Does a Little Tear Come From?"	Marge Barton; Fred MacRae; Arranged by Anita Kerr		1965	with the Anita Kerr Quartet
"Where Is Love?"	Lionel Bart; Arranged by Nick Perito		1977	with Nick Perito Orchestra and the Tony Mansell Singers
"Where or When"	Richard Rodgers	Lorenz Hart	1980	
"Where You're Concerned"	Nancy Goland		1977	with Nick Perito Orchestra & Tony Mansell Singers; Released in 1978
"The Whiffenpoof Song"	Tod B. Galloway	Meade Minnigerode; George S. Pomeroy	1958	with Mitchell Ayres Orchestra & Ray Charles Singers; Part of the "Letters" Medley
"While We're Young"	Alec Wilder; Morty Palitz	Bill Engvick	1952	with Mitchell Ayres Orchestra & Chorus
"While We're Young"	Alec Wilder; Morty Palitz	Bill Engvick	1960	with Mitchell Ayres Orchestra & Chorus
"White Christmas"	Irving Berlin		1947	with Lloyd Shaffer Orchestra and a Mixed Chorus
"White Christmas"	Irving Berlin		1959	with Mitchell Ayres Orchestra & Ray Charles Singers
"White Christmas"	Irving Berlin		1980	Part of Bing Crosby Medley
"Whither Thou Goest"	Guy Singer		1958	with Mitchell Ayres Orchestra & Ray Charles Singers
"Who Put That Dream in Your Eyes?"	Al Stewart; M. P. Brown		1975	Windmill
"Why Did You Leave Me?"	Norman Kaye; Steve Nelson		1952	with Mitchell Ayres & his Orchestra
"Why Does It Have to Rain on Sunday?"	Bob Merrill; Vi Ott		1975	
"Wild Horses"	Robert Schumann; Adaptation: Johnny Burke writing as "K.C. Rogan"	Johnny Burke writing as "K.C. Rogan"	1953	with Hugo Winterhalter Orchestra & Chorus
"The Wind Beneath My Wings"	Larry Henley; Jeff Silbar		1987	with Nick Perito Orchestra
"Winter Wonderland"	Felix Bernard; Dick Smith		1946	with The Satisfiers featuring instrumental backing from Russ Case & his Orchestra
"Winter Wonderland"	Felix Bernard; Dick Smith		1959	with Mitchell Ayres Orchestra
"With All My Heart and Soul"	Larry Stock; Stanley Adams		1951	with Mitchell Ayres & his Orchestra
"With a Song in My Heart"	Richard Rodgers	Lorenz Hart	1948 (twice)	with Henri René Orchestra & Chorus
"With a Song in My Heart"	Richard Rodgers	Lorenz Hart	1948 (twice)	with Robert Tucker Chorus from the film Words and Music
"Without a Song"	Vincent Youmans	Billy Rose; Edward Eliscu	1951	with Mitchell Ayres Orchestra & Chorus
"Without a Song"	Vincent Youmans	Billy Rose; Edward Eliscu	1970	with The Doodletown Pipers
"Without Your Love"	Johnny Lange; Fred Striker; Arranged by Cam Mullins		1973	(not released)
"Woman of the World"			1973	(not released)
"Wonderful Baby"	Don McLean; Arranged by William E. Justis		1975	with The Nashville Sounds
"World of Dreams"	Des O'Connor; Arranged by William E. Justis		1975	with The Nashville Sounds
"A World of Love (That I Found in Your Arms)"	François Deguelt	English: Judy Spencer	1967	with Nick Perito Orchestra & Ray Charles Singers
"Wouldn't It Be Nice?"	Jimmy McHugh	Harold Adamson	1945	with The Satisfiers featuring instrumental backing from Ted Steele Orchestra
"Wrong Rainbow"	Michael Bacon; Arranged by Cam Mullins		1975	with The Nashville Sounds (not released)
Y
"Yellow Beach Umbrella"	Craig Doerge	Judy Henske	1975	with The Nashville Sounds (not released)
"Yes, No, Maybe!"	Shirley Brotman; Walter Brown; Arranged by Bob Mersey		1976	(not released)
"Yesterday"	Lennon–McCartney		1966	with Nick Perito Orchestra & Ray Charles Singers
"Yesterday I Heard the Rain"	Canache Armando Manzanero	Gene Lees	1971	with the Ray Charles Singers
"Yo Te Quiero Asi"	Don McLean	Spanish: Jose Maria Pater	1973	Only had a limited release as a Victor single in the US and as a RCA single in other countries
"You Alone (Solo Tu)"	Robert Allen	Al Stillman	1953	with Hugo Winterhalter Orchestra & Chorus
"You Alone (Solo Tu)"	Robert Allen	Al Stillman	1961	with Mitchell Ayres Orchestra featuring Guitar played by Tony Mottola performed as a medley with two other songs
"You Are in Love"	Bart Howard		1959	with Mitchell Ayres Orchestra & Ray Charles Singers
"You Are My World"	Paul Vance; Bobby London; Arranged by Kenny Ascher		1980	
"You Are Never Far Away"	Robert Allen	Allen Roberts	1952	with Mitchell Ayres Orchestra & Chorus (not released)
"You Are Never Far Away"	Robert Allen	Allen Roberts	1958	with Mitchell Ayres Orchestra and Ray Charles Singers
"You Are So Beautiful"	Billy Preston; Bruce Fisher; Arranged by Gerald Alters & Stanley Schwartz		1978	with Nick Perito Orchestra; First Released in 1983
"You Are the Sunshine of My Life"	Stevie Wonder		1974	with the Ray Charles Singers
"You Came a Long Way from St. Louis"	John Benson Brooks	Bob Russell	1959	with Mitchell Ayres Orchestra
"You Can't Pull the Wool Over My Eyes"			1936	with the Ted Weems Orchestra
"You Do Something to Me"	Cole Porter		1955	with Mitchell Ayres Orchestra
"You Light Up My Life"	Joe Brooks; Arranged by Nick Perito		1977	with Nick Perito Orchestra
"You'll Always Be My Lifetime Sweetheart"	Robert "Bobby" Day	Johnny Burke (writing as K.C. Rogan)	1955	
"You'll Never Walk Alone"	Richard Rodgers	Oscar Hammerstein II	1951	with Mitchell Ayres & his Orchestra (not released)
"You'll Never Walk Alone"	Richard Rodgers	Oscar Hammerstein II	1952	with Mitchell Ayres Orchestra & Chorus
"You'll Never Walk Alone"	Richard Rodgers	Oscar Hammerstein II	1970	with The Doodletown Pipers
"You'll Never Walk Alone"	Richard Rodgers	Oscar Hammerstein II	1980	
"You Made It That Way (Watermelon Summer)"	Dwayne Blackwell; Rani Blackwell; Arranged by Cam Mullins		1967	
"You Make Me Feel So Young"	Joseph Myrow	Mack Gordon	1960	with Mitchell Ayres Orchestra & Chorus
"You Needed Me"	Randy Goodrum		1980	
"Young at Heart"	Johnny Richards	Carolyn Leigh	1960	with Mitchell Ayres Orchestra & Chorus
"Young Love"	Ric Cartey; Carole Joyner; Arranged by O. B. Masingill		1960	with Mitchell Ayres Orchestra & Chorus
"You're Following Me"	Burt Bacharach	Bob Hilliard	1961	with Mitchell Ayres Orchestra & Ray Charles Singers.
"You're Just in Love"	Irving Berlin		1950	with The Fontane Sisters featuring instrumental backing from Mitchell Ayres Orchestra; From the Broadway musical Call Me Madam
"You're Nearer"	Richard Rodgers	Lorenz Hart	1948	with Robert Tucker Chorus; Recorded for the film Words & Music
"You're Nearer"	Richard Rodgers	Lorenz Hart	1968	with Nick Perito Orchestra
"You're Nearer"	Richard Rodgers	Lorenz Hart	1987	with Nick Perito Orchestra featuring Guitar Solo by Dennis Budimir
"You Were Meant for Me"	Nacio Herb Brown	Arthur Freed	1961	with Mitchell Ayres Orchestra featuring Guitar played by Tony Mottola performed in a medley with two other songs
"You Won't Be Satisfied (Until You Break My Heart)"	Teddy Powell; Larry Stock		1946	with The Satisfiers featuring instrumental backing from Russ Case Orchestra
Z
"Zing Zing —Zoom Zoom"	Sigmund Romberg	Charles Tobias	1950	with Sigmund Romberg Orchestra & Chorus
