= Beyond Tomorrow =

Beyond Tomorrow may refer to:

- Beyond Tomorrow (TV series), an Australian documentary series
- Beyond Tomorrow (film), a 1940 film starring Harry Carey
- Beyond Tomorrow (radio series), a 1950s American radio program
- "Beyond Tomorrow" (song), a song by Perry Como
