= Prisoner of Love (Russ Columbo song) =

1931 song by Clarence Gaskill, Russ Columbo, Leo Robin

Single by Perry Como with Russ Case and His Orchestra
- A-side: "All Through the Day"
- Published: October 19, 1931 by Con Conrad Music Publisher, Ltd., New York
- Released: March 1946
- Recorded: December 18, 1945
- Studio: RCA Victor Studio 2, New York City
- Genre: Popular music
- Length: 3:25
- Label: RCA Victor 20-1814
- Composers: Russ Columbo and Clarence Gaskill
- Lyricist: Leo Robin
- Producers: Eli Oberstein and Herb Hendler

Perry Como with Russ Case and His Orchestra singles chronology
| "I'm Always Chasing Rainbows / You Won't Be Satisfied (Until You Break My Heart)" (1946) | "Prisoner of Love" (1946) | "They Say It's Wonderful / If You Were the Only Girl (In the World)" (1946) |

"Prisoner of Love"
1931 recording featuring Russ Columbo

"Prisoner of Love" is a 1931 popular song, with music by Russ Columbo and Clarence Gaskill and lyrics by Leo Robin.

== Background ==
Written in 1931, Leo Robin has related how publisher Con Conrad walked into his hotel room with Russ Columbo and asked him to write words within the hour for a tune he had. Robin, who was on vacation, at first refused, but Conrad explained that he wanted Columbo to demonstrate it to Flo Ziegfeld who needed a song for Helen Morgan in one of his shows. Robin then wrote the lyric, which he afterwards said he disliked, and the song was duly performed for Ziegfeld, but he did not accept it. Russ Columbo, however, sang it on his radio show and recorded it on October 9, 1931, for Victor Records, and it was very popular in 1932. Columbo also sang it in the 1933 short film That Goes Double. In 1946, the song became a major hit for Billy Eckstine, Perry Como, and the Ink Spots.

== Billy Eckstine version ==
Billy Eckstine recorded his version with Richard Ellington on piano and Art Blakey on drums, on September 4, 1945. The record became a million seller and a No. 10 hit.

== Perry Como versions ==
Perry Como's first recording was made on December 18, 1945, and released by RCA Victor as catalog number 20-1814-B. It first reached the Billboard magazine charts on March 30, 1946, and lasted 21 weeks on the chart, peaking at No. 1. The flip side was "All Through the Day". This recording was re-released in 1949, by RCA Victor, as a 78 rpm single (catalog number 20-3298-A) and a 45 rpm single (catalog number 47-2886), with the flip side "Temptation". Billboard ranked it as the No. 1 song of the year for 1946.

Como made two further recordings of the song: one in February 1946 for a V-Disc, number CS-656-B, and another in July 1970 in a live performance in Las Vegas, issued as a long-playing album (titled Perry Como in Person at the International Hotel, Las Vegas in its United States and United Kingdom releases, Perry Como in Person in its Japanese release, and Perry Como in Concert in its Dutch release).

The Como version was used on the soundtrack of the 1980 film, Raging Bull.

== The Ink Spots version ==
This was recorded on March 18, 1946, for Decca Records (catalogue No. 18864), and it spent 11 weeks in the USA charts, peaking at No. 9.

== James Brown version ==
"Prisoner of Love"

Single by James Brown

from the album Prisoner of Love
- B-side: "Choo-Choo (Locomotion)"
- Released: April 1963
- Recorded: December 17, 1962
- Studio: Bell Sound (New York City)
- Genre: R&B, Soul
- Length: 2:24
- Label: King Records; 5739
- Songwriters: Russ Columbo; Clarence Gaskill; Leo Robin
- Producers: James Brown; Hal Neely

James Brown charting singles chronology
| "Every Beat of My Heart" (1963) | "Prisoner of Love" (1963) | "These Foolish Things" (1963) |

Audio video
- "Prisoner Of Love" on YouTube

James Brown revived "Prisoner of Love" in 1963. It charted at No. 6 R&B and at No. 18 Pop. The studio recording was arranged by Sammy Lowe. Brown performed the song live with his vocal group, The Famous Flames, in the concert film T.A.M.I. Show and on a mid-1960s telecast of The Ed Sullivan Show. It also appears on many of his live albums.

== Other notable recordings ==
- 1932 Roy Fox and His Band - vocal by Al Bowlly.
- 1939 Mildred Bailey recorded for Vocalion Records (catalogue No. 5268) on March 16, 1939.
- 1941 Teddy Wilson - Lena Horne (vocal) NYC, September 16, 1941.
- 1956 Bing Crosby recorded the song for his album Songs I Wish I Had Sung the First Time Around.
- 1957 Les Paul and Mary Ford - for their album Time to Dream.
- 1957 Coleman Hawkins and Ben Webster, with Oscar Peterson - (instrumental) for their album Coleman Hawkins Encounters Ben Webster.
- 1958 Jerry Vale - for the album I Remember Russ.
- 1958 Matt Monro issued as a single for Fontana Records.
- 1960 The Platters on their EP Pick Of The Platters No.6.
- 1962 Frank Sinatra - recorded for his album Sinatra and Strings.
- 1962 Keely Smith - for her album Because You're Mine.
- 1962 Pat Boone - recorded for his album I'll See You in My Dreams.
- 1962 Etta James - recorded for her album Etta James Sings for Lovers.
- 1981 Flo & Eddie from their album Rock Steady with Flo & Eddie.
- 1994 Tiny Tim on his album Prisoner of love (A Tribute To Russ Columbo).
- 2005 Cyndi Lauper's rendition of "Prisoner of Love" is in the soundtrack of the "Romance and Cigarettes" (dir. John Turturro)
