= That's a Mother's Liberty Loan =

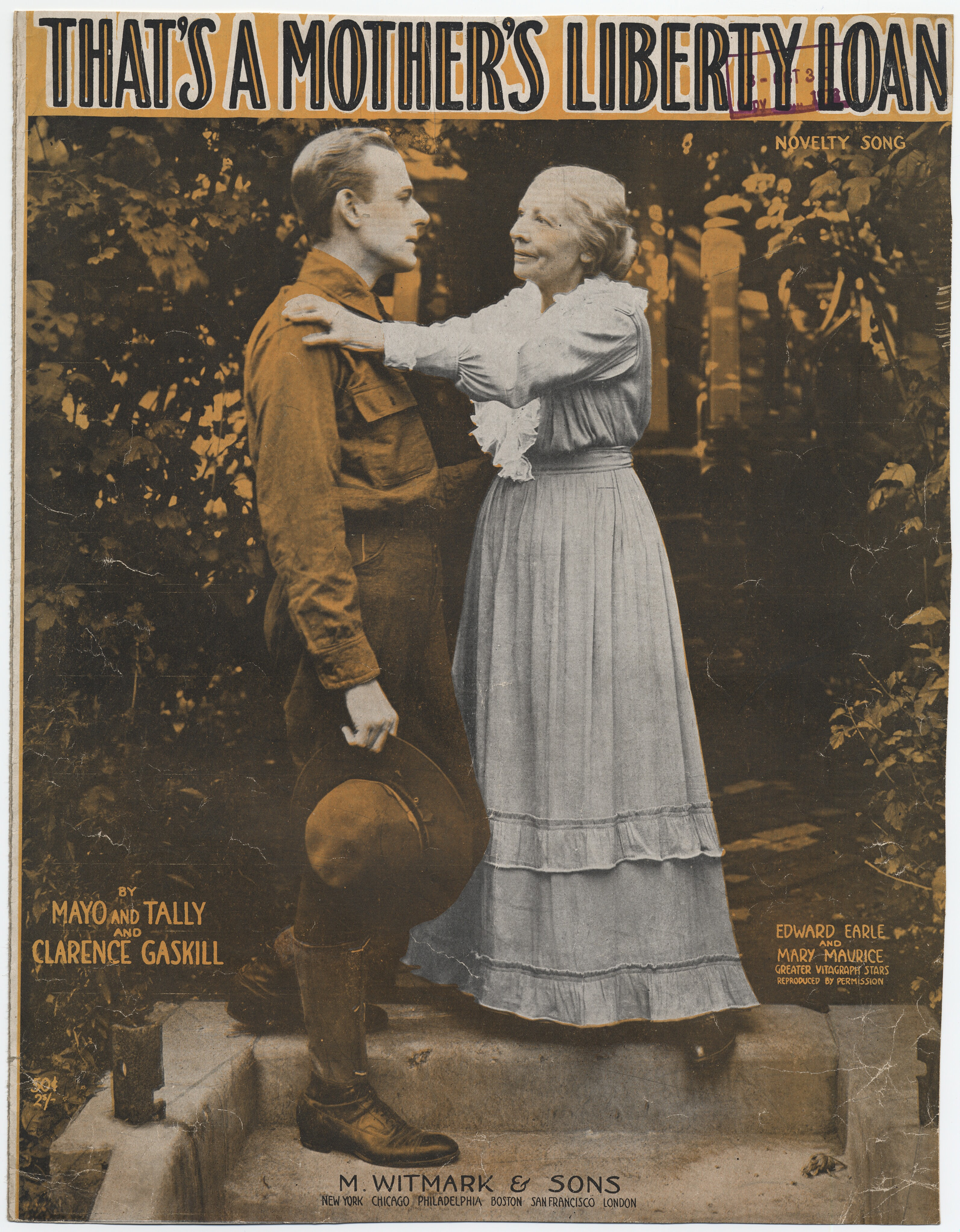

Song
- Released: 1917
- Songwriter(s): Clarence Gaskill, Harry Tally, Harry Mayo

"That's a Mother's Liberty Loan" is a World War I era song released in 1917. Clarence Gaskill, Harry Tally, and Harry Mayo wrote the lyrics and composed the music. The song was published by M. Witmark & Sons of New York City. On the cover is a vitagraph photo of actors Edward Earle (in uniform) and Mary Maurice facing one another. The song was written for both voice and piano. It was performed by Greek Evans.

The sheet music can be found at Pritzker Military Museum & Library.

== Analysis ==
The message relayed by the song's lyrics is that a mother's son is her "loan for liberty;" likening her son's participation in the war to buying liberty bonds. In fact, giving up one's son was viewed as an "investment" in the country's future. As evidenced by the mother's exclamation in the song, "I think I've done my share!" The chorus is as follows:

I gave my boy to Uncle Sam
To fight for you and me,
Just like his dad at Gettysburg
In Eighteen Sixty-Three
If life must pay for liberty,
I'm giving all I own,
And when the battle's won
I'll then take back my son.
That's a mother's liberty loan!"
