= Till the End of Time (song) =

1945 song by Ted Mossman, Buddy Kaye and Frédéric Chopin

Single by Perry Como with Russ Case and His Orchestra
- B-side: (Did You Ever Get) That Feeling in the Moonlight
- Released: July 30, 1945
- Recorded: 1945
- Genre: Popular music
- Length: 3:05
- Label: RCA
- Composers: Ted Mossman, Frédéric Chopin
- Lyricist: Buddy Kaye
- Producer: Herb Hendler

Perry Como with Russ Case and His Orchestra singles chronology
"If I Loved You" (1945)	"Till the End of Time" (1945)	"Dig You Later (A Hubba-Hubba-Hubba)" (1945)

"Till the End of Time" is a popular song written by lyricist Buddy Kaye and composer Ted Mossman and published in 1945. The melody is based on Frédéric Chopin's Polonaise in A flat major, Op. 53, the "Polonaise héroique".

A number of recordings of the song were made in 1945. The biggest hit was by Perry Como; another version by Dick Haymes also charted; the Les Brown orchestra, with vocalist Doris Day, and Ginny Simms also made a recording of the song.

Como's single first reached the Billboard magazine Honor Roll Hits charts on August 18, 1945, and lasted 17 weeks on the chart, peaking at No. 1 (spending 10 consecutive weeks at the top). This was Como's first No. 1 hit song, and first single to sell two million copies. The song lends its title to the 1946 film of the same name, about American veterans returning home from World War II, and Como's version is heard several times in the film itself.

Haymes single first reached the Billboard magazine charts on September 13, 1945, and lasted eight weeks on the chart, peaking at No. 3, and the one by Les Brown/Doris Day peaked at No. 3 on the Billboard magazine pop chart.
