= If I Loved You =

1945 song by Richard Rodgers and Oscar Hammerstein II

Single by Perry Como
- B-side: "I'm Gonna Love That Gal (Like She's Never Been Loved Before)"
- Released: June 4, 1945
- Recorded: May 19, 1945
- Genre: Popular music
- Length: 3:22
- Label: RCA Victor 20-1676
- Composer: Richard Rodgers
- Lyricist: Oscar Hammerstein II
- Producer: Herb Hendler

Perry Como singles chronology
"Temptation" (1945)	"If I Loved You" (1945)	"Till the End of Time" (1945)

"If I Loved You" is a show tune from the 1945 Rodgers and Hammerstein musical Carousel.

== Background ==
In the show, the characters of Billy Bigelow and Julie Jordan sing this song as they hesitantly declare their love for one another, yet are too shy to express their true feelings.

The song was in turn inspired by lines of dialogue from Ferenc Molnár's original Liliom, the source material for the musical.

== Carousel ==
The song was introduced by John Raitt as "Billy Bigelow" and Jan Clayton as "Julie" in the original Broadway production.

The song was performed in the 1956 film version Carousel by Gordon MacRae and Shirley Jones.

== Other recordings ==
There were four hit versions of the song in 1945: Perry Como (#3), Frank Sinatra (#7), Bing Crosby (#8) and Harry James (#8). In 1954, Roy Hamilton's recording went to #4 on Billboard's, Best Sellers in Stores chart. A version by Chad & Jeremy reached #16 on Canada's RPM charts, March 29, 1965.

Many artists have recorded the song over the years. Vagabon recorded a version for the 2023 film Red, White & Royal Blue.
