= Finchley Children's Music Group =

English musical group

Finchley Children's Music Group (FCMG) is a UK youth choir based in North London for children aged 4 to 18.

Finchley Children's Music Group (FCMG) was founded in 1958 after a group of singers and instrumentalists came together to give the first amateur performance of Benjamin Britten’s Noye's Fludde. Some members participated in the London Boy Singers choir organized by Britten.

To this end, FCMG holds weekly rehearsals for all its choirs and creates opportunities for public performance of choral music. FCMG is regularly invited to perform in professional concerts with major orchestras such as LSO, LPO and the BBC Symphony Orchestra and with other children and adult choirs. The main performing choir of upper voices and the SATB Chamber Choir sing regularly in major London venues, a recent appearance being at the BBC Proms in September 2008 when the Senior Choir performed La damnation de Faust with the Boston Symphony Orchestra and the Tanglewood Festival Chorus under James Levine. FCMG makes regular appearances at the BBC Proms and has performed at the premier of two works commissioned by the BBC: Sir Peter Maxwell Davies’ A Little Light Birthday Music for the Queen’s 80th Birthday in 2006 and Alex Roth’s Earth and Sky in 2000. The choir performed in Britten’s War Requiem in the 2004 series and Beethoven’s 9th Symphony in 2005.

FCMG offers training and performance opportunities for singers aged between 4 and 18. At present there are over 150 members. The Beginner and Intermediate Choirs are open to all, whilst admission to the Senior and Chamber Choirs is by audition. FCMG has no core funding: running costs are met entirely from members’ subscriptions. The children are drawn from a wide variety of social, cultural and economic backgrounds and financial support is available for those of necessitous financial circumstances so that as many children as possible may benefit from being part of the Group. This support derives from local authority grants or from our own bursary fund which is sourced mainly by voluntary donations from parents.

Since its formation, FCMG has pursued an ongoing commitment to the commissioning of new music for children's voices which was one of the objectives of its founding. Composers who have written for the Group in the past include Brian Chapple, Judith Bingham, Elizabeth Maconchy, Sir Peter Maxwell Davies, Alex Roth, Malcolm Williamson, Piers Hellawell and Christopher Gunning. Many of these works are now prominent in the established canon of choral music that is available for upper voices. FCMG continues to perform these works regularly; for example, Aunt Vita by Christopher Gunning was premièred at St John's, Smith Square in 2002 and was showcased again at the East Finchley Festival in 2003. Brian Chapple's two works Songs of Innocence and its companion Songs of Experience have become an integral part of the repertoire of the Choir; the former was performed in 1994, 1995 and 2003 and the latter in 2002.

In 2008/2009 FCMG celebrated its 50th anniversary and this celebration was marked by further commissions: Two song cycles for children's choir from composers John Pickard (Songs of Rain and Sea with text by Sigrún Davíðsdóttir) and James Weeks (Hototogisu, a setting of 17 Haiku written by the great Japanese post Basho). These were premiered at St Pancras New Church, London, in July 2008 and were given their second performance the following January at Kings Place.

In 2008 FCMG also commissioned composer Malcolm Singer and poet Nick Toczek to create a new children's opera for the same forces as Benjamin Britten's children's opera Noye’s Fludde – 3 adult roles, children's choir and soloists, strings, piano and percussion. The result was The Jailer’s Tale, which was premiered by three professional adult soloists (Steven Jeffes - tenor, Jimmy Holliday - bass and Rebecca Lodge - mezzo-soprano) together with some 170 young people, aged 5 to 18 years, from FCMG with the orchestra from the Yehudi Menuhin School conducted by Grace Rossiter in February 2010. The Jailer’s Tale received its premiere staged performances at the Pentland Theatre - artsdepot, Finchley on Friday February 26 and Saturday February 27, 2010. Prior to this it received a concert performance at The Menuhin Hall, Stoke D’Abernon, Surrey on Sunday February 7, 2010.

FCMG has recorded regularly for radio, television, film and on the Hyperion, Naxos, Somm, EMI and Decca labels. Over the last two years the choir has been used extensively to record tracks for Sing Up, the UK government initiative to encourage singing in primary schools.
