= Rosamund Strode =

- Born: 18 May 1927; Amersham, Buckinghamshire
- Died: 25 March 2010 (aged 82); Aldeburgh, Suffolk
- Education: Royal College of Music
- Occupations: Musician, singer, editor, and administrator. Assistant and amanuensis to Benjamin Britten (1964-1976)

Rosamund Strode (18 May 1927 – 25 March 2010) was a British musician, editor, and administrator. She was Benjamin Britten's assistant and amanuensis from 1964 until his death in 1976, and keeper of manuscripts at the Britten-Pears Library in Aldeburgh until 1992.

== Early life ==
Rosamund Strode was born in Amersham, Buckinghamshire on 18 May 1927, the daughter of Maurice Strode and Nancy Gotch (whose grandfather was the Victorian painter John Callcott Horsley). Her mother had been a pupil of Gustav Holst at St. Paul's Girls’ School.

Rosamund went to St Mary's school in Calne, Wiltshire, before studying viola and singing at the Royal College of Music. One of her teachers there was Ralph Vaughan Williams.

== Career ==
In 1948, Strode became an assistant to Imogen Holst, then teaching at Dartington Hall. It was there that she first met Benjamin Britten. Although she had planned to become a county music organiser, her time at Dartington re-inclined Strode towards singing. At Dartington, she sang in a concert with Peter Pears and Alfred Deller to mark the bicentenary of the death of Johann Sebastian Bach. In 1952, she joined the choir that Holst had founded in London, later known as the Purcell Singers. She also worked organising the London Boy Singers.

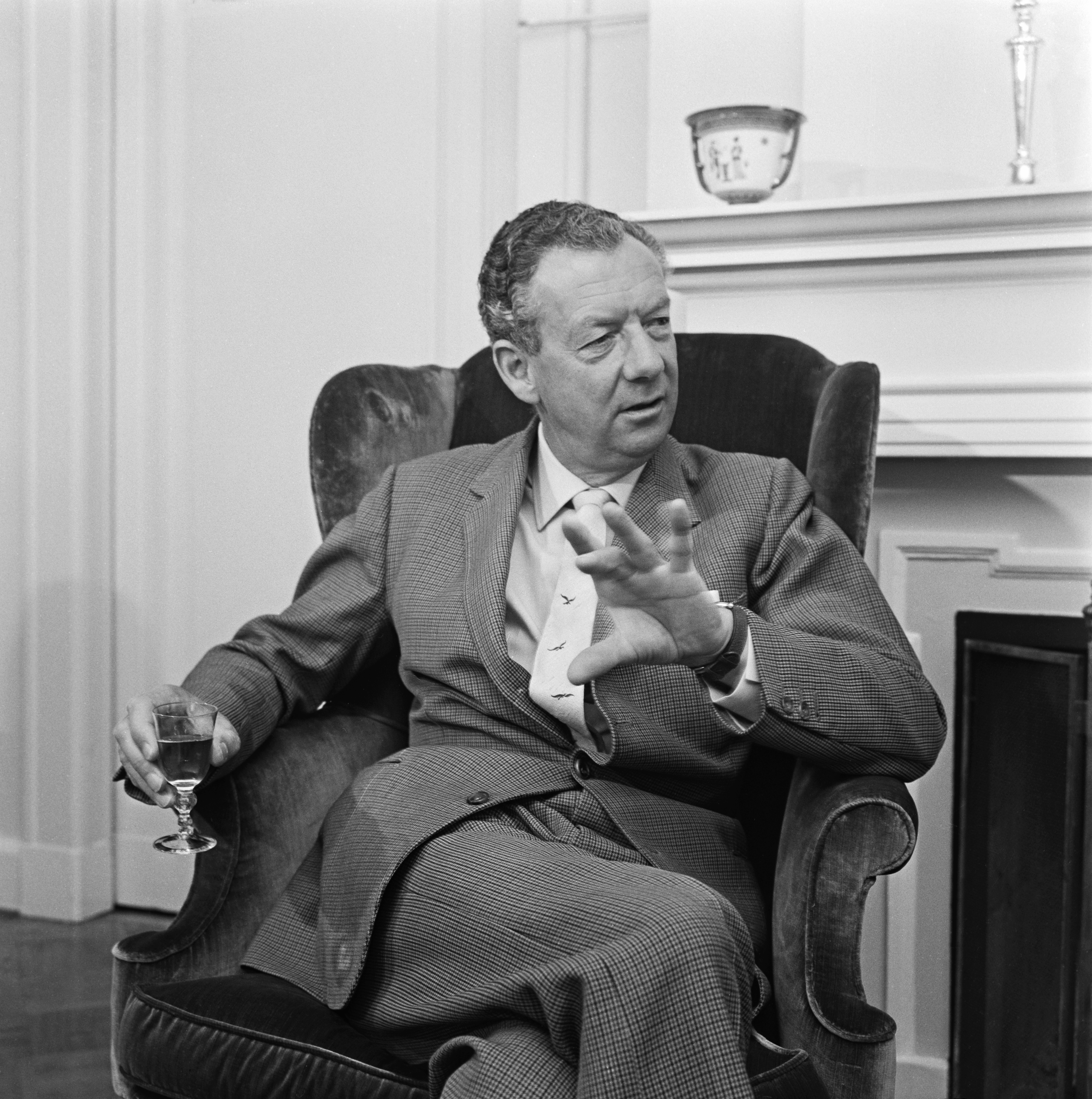
Benjamin Britten, 8 October 1965

Still assistant to Britten, Imogen Holst had moved to Aldeburgh, where Strode performed regularly. Strode assisted Holst through the 1950s, and moved to Aldeburgh in 1956. Her work increasingly involved duties for Britten, conducting research and helping with musical scores. Strode became a part-time assistant to the Aldeburgh Festival and in 1964, when Holst moved to focus on her own work, began working full time for Britten.

Among Strode's main roles were preparing fair copies of Britten's scores and editing his music for publication. One of her earliest tasks was cataloguing his childhood music. She also page-turned for Britten when he played piano, and worked in whatever capacity was required of her during the Aldeburgh Festival. Known for her attention to detail, exacting standards, and extensive knowledge of Britten's works, Strode remained his music assistant until Britten's death in 1976. Through her work during this period, The Times described Strode as having "midwifed the music of his Indian summer".

In 1966, Strode took on her own assistant, composer David Matthews. Matthews remained Strode's part-time assistant until 1969. In 1971, David Matthews' younger brother Colin, also a composer, was hired to assist Strode. This partly freed her to focus, from 1973, on the establishment of the Britten–Pears Library, whose policies and procedures she led the creation of. Colin Matthews later wrote Rosamund's Fanfare and Rosamund's Waltz, that were performed for Strode's 80th birthday on Britten's piano.

Following Britten's death, Strode became keeper of manuscripts at the Britten-Pears library, and was the Britten-Pears Foundation's founding archivist. She retired in 1992.

Strode wrote a number of essays on Britten's work, including an account of Britten's composition of Death in Venice for Donald Mitchell's book about the opera. She was joint author of Imogen Holst: A Life in Music (2007)–a landmark study of her close friend and mentor.

Strode chaired the Holst Foundation for many years. In 2004, she unveiled an English Heritage Blue Plaque for Gustav Holst at St Paul's Girls' School in West London.

== Death and legacy ==
Rosamund Strode died aged 82 on 25 March 2010.

In an obituary for The Guardian, Colin Matthews wrote:

Fiercely protective of Britten's privacy, she was self-effacing and modest about her own achievements, which were considerable... She inherited from Imogen Holst a mission to explain, and her legacy will continue to be found in the writings and memories of the many musicians and scholars who came to learn at her feet.

Christopher M. Scheer has argued that "understanding these individuals [Britten's amanuenses] and their place in the culture surrounding Britten illuminates how much they enabled his creative life," as well as "the extent to which they shaped, and continue to influence, our understanding of his life and music". The Sydney Morning Herald wrote that Strode "did as much as anyone to keep [Britten's] star shining brightly at Aldeburgh".

A sketch of Strode by Milein Cosman is held at the Red House, Aldeburgh, where she worked.
