= Clarence Gaskill =

American composer and lyricist

- Born: February 2, 1892; Philadelphia, Pennsylvania
- Died: April 29, 1948 (aged 56); New Brighton, New York
- Occupations: Lyricist and Composer
- Years active: 1920s to early 1930s
- Known for: "I Can't Believe That You're in Love with Me", "Prisoner of Love", and "That's a Mother's Liberty Loan"

Clarence Gaskill (February 2, 1892 – April 29, 1948) was an American composer and lyricist active during the 1920s to early 1930s. His most well-known songs include, "Doo-Wacka-Doo" (1921). "I Can't Believe That You're in Love with Me" (1926), and "Prisoner of Love" (1932). His first hit came in 1919 with "I Love You Just the Same, Sweet Adeline".

== Personal life ==
Gaskill was born on February 2, 1892, in Philadelphia, Pennsylvania. He attended St. John's School and Friends School in Pennsylvania. Gaskill's first music teacher was his mother, but he was later taught by private teachers.

Gaskill died on April 29, 1948, in New Brighton, New York City. His wife was Matilda Gaskill and they lived on Richmont Street in Scranton, Pennsylvania.

== Career ==
At the age of 16, Gaskill was employed at a local theatre, working as a pianist. By the age of 21, he had founded his own music publishing firm.

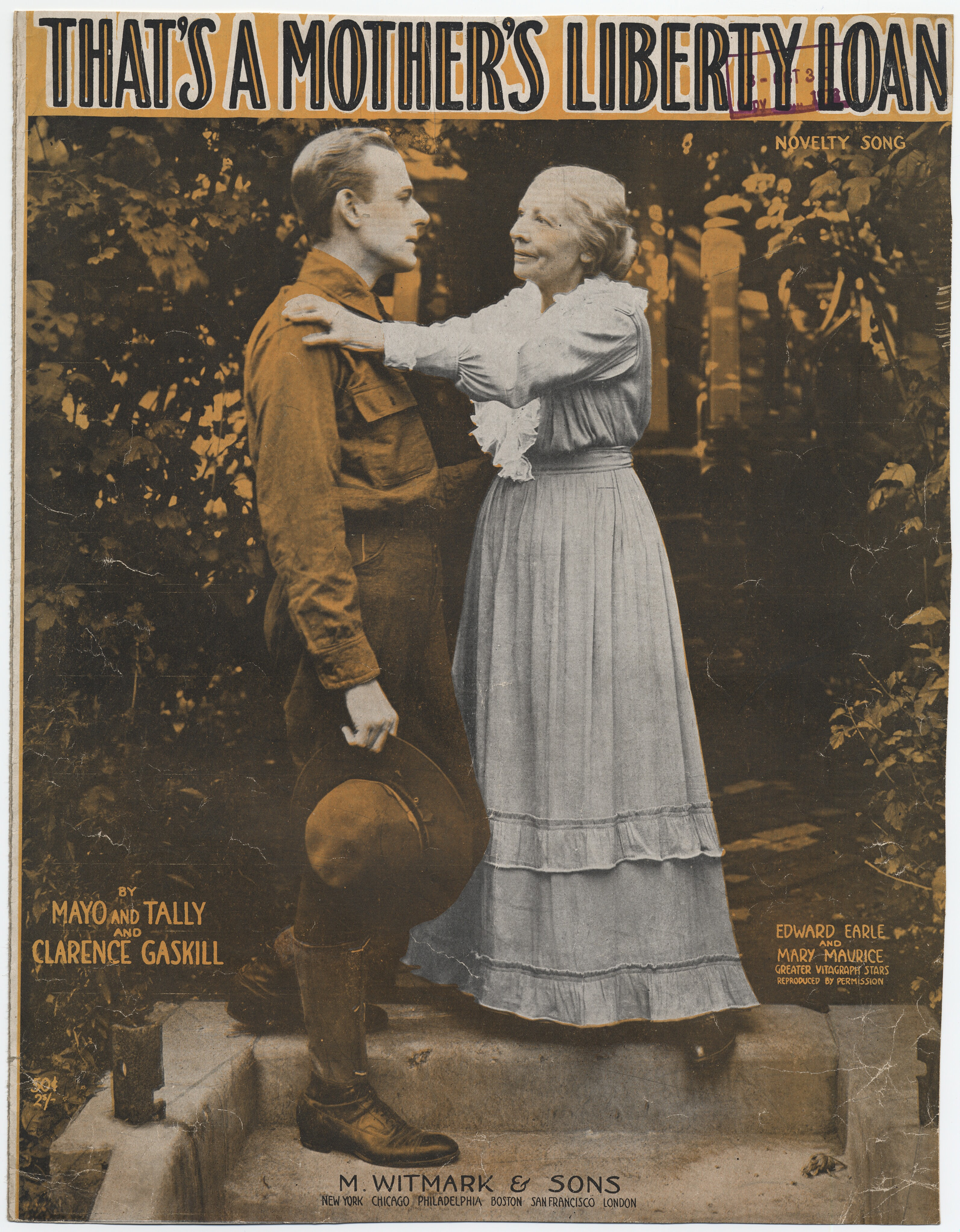
Sheet music cover of WWI song written by Gaskill

Sheet Music of Doo Wacka Doo co-written by Gaskill

During World War I, he served as a machine gunner. For his service, he earned the Purple Heart. Gaskill also entertained troops during the war, and even wrote the war song, "That's a Mother's Liberty Loan".

After the war was over, Gaskill toured vaudeville under the stage name, "Melody Monarch".

His first hit was in 1919, with the release of "I Love you Just the Same, Sweet Adeline." Two years later he joined the American Society of Composers, Authors and Publishers. Gaskill wrote the song, "Prisoner of Love" in 1932. It was re-recorded by various artists including, The Ink Spots, Billy Eckstine, and Perry Como. His song, "Doo-Wacka-Doo" (1921), capitalized on the "Hawaiian craze" popular during that time. The song was made famous by Paul Whiteman's orchestra.

Gaskill was employed by Irving and Jack Mills. He wrote music for Earl Carroll's Vanities (1925) and Keep it Clean (1929). Throughout his career he collaborated with various musicians, lyricists, and composers, including Jimmy McHugh, Irving Mills, Duke Ellington, Leo Robin, and Cab Calloway.

Because he was very knowledgeable about the music business and copyright laws, Gaskill was able to use that to his advantage. He claimed composer credit on Christmas songs and nursery rhymes like, "Jingle Bells," "Adeste Fideles," "The Farmer in the Dell," and "Twinkle, Twinkle, Little Star."

== Selected works ==
- "Another Perfect Day Has Passed Away". With Robert H. Noeltner, Haia Kaa, and Ethel Shutta. 1933. Keit-Engel. OCLC 22534868
- "Prisoner of Love". With Leo Robin and Russ Columbo. 1931. Mayfair Music Corp. OCLC 18861310
- "Minnie the Moocher". With Cab Calloway and Irving Mills. 1931.
- "I Can't Believe That You're in Love with Me". With Jimmy McHugh. 1927. Jack Mills Inc. OCLC 18894785
- "Nobody's Business Fox Trot". With Irving Mills. 1926(?). OCLC 6740250
- "Doo-Wacka-Doo". With Will Donaldson and George Horther. 1921. Capitol Records. OCLC 681752914
- "I Love You Just the Same, Sweet Adeline". With Harry Armstrong. 1919. Edison Blue Amberol. OCLC 40071660.
