= Buddy Kaye =

American songwriter (1918–2002)

- Born: Jules Leonard Kaye; January 3, 1918; New York City, New York, U.S.
- Died: November 21, 2002 (aged 84) Rancho Mirage, California, U.S.
- Occupation: Songwriter

Jules Leonard "Buddy" Kaye (January 3, 1918 – November 21, 2002) was an American songwriter, lyricist, arranger, producer, and author. His songs were recorded by top performers, including Frank Sinatra, Bob Dylan, Sarah Vaughan, Dinah Washington, Ella Fitzgerald, The McGuire Sisters, Glenn Miller, Sammy Kaye, Perry Como, Elvis Presley, Charles Aznavour, Tony Bennett, Cliff Richard, Pat Boone, Harry Belafonte, Bobby Darin, Little Richard, Barry Manilow, Karen Carpenter, Diana Krall, and Dusty Springfield. He scored number-one hits on the Billboard charts in 1945 with "Till The End Of Time", recorded by Perry Como, and in 1949 with "'A' You're Adorable (The Alphabet Song)", recorded by Como and The Fontane Sisters. Among his most recognizable tunes in pop culture are the theme songs to the Famous Studios theatrical cartoons Little Lulu and Little Audrey; the international hit song "Speedy Gonzales", recorded by Pat Boone; and the co-written theme song to the television series I Dream of Jeannie. In 1976, he won a Grammy Award for best children's album for his production of The Little Prince, narrated by Richard Burton.

As an author he had four published books, including: The Wisdom of Baltasar Gracian (Pocket Books, Simon & Schuster), Method Songwriting (St. Martin's Press), The Gift of Acabar - co-authored with Og Mandino (Lippincott, Bantam Books, Penguin, Random House) and "'A' You're Adorable" (Candlewick Press).

Kaye completed the book and lyrics to When Garbo Talks!, his final work, in 2002. The stage musical had its world premiere at International City Theatre, Long Beach Performing Arts Center, October 15, 2010. In 2015, seventy years after first being recorded by Frank Sinatra, Bob Dylan released a cover version of “Full Moon and Empty Arms” on his Shadows in the Night album of Sinatra standards and praised Buddy Kaye in his MusiCares Person of the Year speech as one of the great songwriters who may not be well known in these times but deserves recognition.

In celebration of the centennial birthdate of Buddy Kaye, January 3, 2018, the American Society of Composers, Authors and Publishers (ASCAP) recognized the achievements and success of Golden Circle member Buddy Kaye referring to him in a published article as “A lyricist for the ages". On April 29, 2018, in Brooklyn, NY, the James Madison Alumni Association added Buddy Kaye to the Madison Wall of Distinction.

== Partial list of songs ==
- "'A' You're Adorable" (Perry Como) (with Sid Lippman and Fred Wise)
- "After Loving You" (Charles Aznavour) (with Charles Aznavour)
- "All Cried Out" (Dusty Springfield) (with Philip Springer)
- "All Those Pretty Girls" (Charles Aznavour) (with Charles Aznavour)
- "Almost" (Elvis Presley) (with Ben Weisman) (Film soundtrack)
- "Change of Habit" (Elvis Presley]) (with Ben Weisman) (Main title film)
- "Christmas Alphabet" (Cliff Richard, McGuire Sisters) (with Jules Loman)
- "Full Moon and Empty Arms" (Frank Sinatra, Bob Dylan) (with Ted Mossman)
- "Hear Them Bells" (Bobby Darin) (with Mort Garson)
- "Hurry Sundown" (Harry Belafonte, Little Richard) (with Hugo Montenegro) (Main title film)
- "I Dream of Jeannie" (with Hugo Montenegro) (TV series theme song)
- "I'll Close My Eyes" (Dinah Washington, Sarah Vaughan, Ella Fitzgerald) (with Billy Reid)
- "In the Middle of Nowhere" (Dusty Springfield) (with Bea Verdi)
- "Let Us Pray" (Elvis Presley) (with Ben Weisman) (Film soundtrack)
- "Little Boat” (Cleo Laine) (English lyrics for Roberto Menescal and Ronald Boscoli's 1962 “O Barquinho")
- "Little by Little" (Dusty Springfield) (with Bea Verdi)
- "Little Audrey Says" (with Winston Sharples)
- "Little Lulu" (with Fred Wise and Sidney Lippman)
- "Never Ending" (Elvis Presley) (with Philip Springer) (Film soundtrack)
- "Not as a Stranger" (Frank Sinatra) (with Jimmy Van Heusen) (Main title film)
- "Quiet Nights" (Tony Bennett) (English lyrics for Antonio Carlos Jobim's "Corcovado")
- "Speedy Gonzales" (Pat Boone) (with David Hess and Ethel Lee)
- "Start the Day with a Song" (with Dick Manning)
- "The Next Time" (Cliff Richard) (with Philip Springer)
- "The Old Songs" (Barry Manilow) (with David Pomeranz)
- "Till The End Of Time" (Perry Como) (with Ted Mossman) (9 weeks at No.1 on BILLBOARD Charts, 1945)
- "The Treasure of Sierra Madre" (Dick Haymes with Gordon Jenkins & his Orchestra) (with Dick Manning) (Main title film)
- "The Uninvited Guest" (Karen Carpenter) (with Jeff Tweel)
- "This Is No Laughing Matter" (Glenn Miller) (with Al Frisch)
- "Twist Around the Clock" (Clay Cole) (with Philip Springer and Clay Cole) (Main title film)
- "Walking with My Honey" (Sammy Kaye) (with Dick Manning)
