= Christmas Dream =

Single by Perry Como
- B-side: "Christ Is Born"
- Released: November 1974
- Recorded: August 7, 1974
- Venue: RCA Studio C, New York City
- Genre: Christmas, pop
- Length: 2:45
- Label: RCA Victor
- Composer(s): Andrew Lloyd Webber
- Lyricist(s): Tim Rice
- Producer(s): Andrew Lloyd Webber, Pete Spargo

Perry Como singles chronology
"I Don't Know What He Told You" (1974)	"Christmas Dream" (1974)	"World of Dreams" (1975)

"Christmas Dream" is a song written by Andrew Lloyd Webber and Tim Rice, with German lyrics by Andre Heller, for the 1974 Columbia film The Odessa File. It is sung by Perry Como and the London Boy Singers, and heard as source music over a radio during the main titles of the film. Como and the choir performed the song, a few weeks after the film's October 1974 release, on the television special Perry Como's Christmas Show. The song was subsequently released as a single, reaching #92 on the Billboard Hot 100 chart in December 1974. It was also included on the soundtrack album for the film, and later on Como's 1982 album I Wish It Could Be Christmas Forever.

== Cover versions ==
- The song was covered that same year by Maynard Williams.
- In 1981 it was covered by Scottish singer Isla St Clair.
- In 2013 it was covered by Terry Wogan, Aled Jones and Hayley Westenra.

== Charts ==
Chart performance for "Christmas Dream"
Chart (1974)	Peak position
US Billboard Hot 100	92
