= Beyond Tomorrow (radio series) =

Beyond Tomorrow (a.k.a. Beyond This World) was an American radio drama series developed for CBS in the spring of 1950.

Beyond Tomorrow was meant to be CBS's first science fiction radio program. The show was announced in newspapers but it is not known if any episodes were actually broadcast. An audition show and three additional shows were transcribed to disk.

== List of episodes ==
Title	Air Date	Author	Listen
Aud. The Outer Limit (Beyond This World intro.)	February 23, 1950		mp3
1. Requiem	April 5, 1950	Robert A. Heinlein	
2. Incident at Switchpath (The Sky Was Full of Ships)	April 11, 1950	Theodore Sturgeon	RealMedia
3. The Outer Limit	April 18, 1950		RealMedia
