= London Boy Singers =

- Origin: London, England
- Genres: Classical
- Years active: 1961–1978?

The London Boy Singers were an English boys' choir which formed in 1961. It initially drew its members from the Finchley Children's Music Group. The choir was started at the suggestion of Benjamin Britten, who was its first president.

In the beginning the choir was run by a group of three adults: John Andrewes, who also led the Finchley Children's Music Group, Rosamund Strode, a musician, singer and later assistant to Britten, and Jonathan Steele, deputy to George Malcolm at Westminster Cathedral. Steele became the conductor and leader of the London Boy Singers.

The choir sang at the Aldeburgh Festival on a number of occasions. It sang in Westminster Abbey in the first London performance of Britten's War Requiem in 1962. The group performed at the Royal Albert Hall in 1964 and 1974.

In an attempt to widen the social and geographical mix of the choir, a subsidiary choir was established in Bethnal Green in 1964 but this was eventually merged with the Finchley choir.

Many of its singers took part in other events, including performing at the Royal Opera House, Covent Garden and on tour with them to Manchester and to Lisbon in Portugal, including Britten's A Midsummer Night's Dream and the premiere of Aston's ballet 'The Dream', both in 1964), Covent Garden, the English Opera Group (including a tour of the USSR in 1964) and many individual operas and other engagements. The choir also sang at the Aldeburgh Festival, gave a concert to the choristers at King's College Cambridge and broadcast A Ceremony of Carols on BBC television (1965). Members of the choir also performed as street urchins in a BBC television production of "La Boheme" (1966).

The choir recorded a collection of Christmas Music ('Christmas Music for Boys Voices')for HMV in the Abbey Road Studios, released in 1965. It also recorded 'The happy wanderer' for RCA Victor, and two Christmas songs with the Music Academy (London Jazz Quartet) for CBS which featured on Juke Box Jury. In 1969, the choir toured in Germany and the Netherlands and, in 1971, returned to Germany and also Denmark.

Britten wrote 12 Apostles: Choral Octavo and The Bitter Withy for the choir and his arrangement of King Herod and the Cock was dedicated to it. In 1966, Britten severed his relationship with the group. Jonathan Steele remained its director until the choir folded in the mid 1970s.

Its last known performance was the theme song from the foreign television series Barbapapa in 1974 alongside Ed Stewart, the theme song was heard in the English-dubbed version of the series that was produced for BBC Television in January 1975 until its run ended in 1978.

== See also ==
- Christmas Dream
- Darien Angadi
- Robin Sylvester
- Green Grow the Rushes, O
