= Russ Case =

American jazz musician

- Born: March 19, 1912; Hamburg, Iowa, United States
- Died: October 10, 1964 (aged 52); Miami, Florida, United States
- Genres: Jazz; light music; musical theatre; radio and TV broadcasting
- Occupation(s): Musician (as Conductor, instrumentalist and bandleader)
- Instrument: Trumpet
- Formerly of: Perry Como; Peggy Lee; Eddy Arnold; Julius La Rosa; Frankie Trumbauer; Paul Whiteman

Russ Case (March 19, 1912 – October 10, 1964) was an American trumpeter and bandleader who led jazz and light music orchestras.

== Biography ==
Case was born in Hamburg, Iowa. His professional career began when he was hired at WOC (AM) in Davenport, Iowa to arrange and play trumpet with local bands on broadcasts. He worked with Frankie Trumbauer in Chicago and Paul Whiteman in New York City, then was hired by NBC to arrange for radio and television. He led orchestras which accompanied broadcasts of singers such as Peggy Lee, Eddy Arnold and Julius LaRosa, but became best known for directing ensembles behind Perry Como, including on his hit single "Till the End of Time".

Case lent his name to dozens of light orchestral albums which were released in the 1950s, and arranged for The Jackie Gleason Show in the 1960s. He also served as conductor for cast recordings of musicals such as Finian's Rainbow, The King and I, The Music Man, My Fair Lady, and Oklahoma!. He died, aged 52, in Miami in 1964.
