= Beyond Tomorrow (song) =

"Beyond Tomorrow" is a song from the motion picture Serpico (1973), with words by Larry Kusik and music by Mikis Theodorakis.

Theodorakis and Kusik were nominated for Grammy and BAFTA awards for the soundtrack. Perry Como, backed by the Ray Charles Singers, recorded the song at an RCA studio (Studio "C") in New York City on January 4, 1974.

The catalog numbers of the 45 rpm singles released are as follows:

- United States: RCA Victor APB0-0225-A; flip side "It All Seems to Fall Into Line"
- Japan: RCA SS-2356; flip side "It All Seems to Fall Into Line"
- United Kingdom: LPB0-7518 B (1974); flip side "I Want to Give"
- Bolivia: RCA 9067; flip side "Eres tú" ("It's You")

== Background ==
It is a love song, starting with images of "waking spring" and "golden sunrise" with love as a summer harvest. It continues "Beyond tomorrow, the gift of lovers, waits bright and free." and ends with the two lovers standing alone against a cold sky.
