= Herb Hendler =

Herb Hendler (June 17, 1918 – October 16, 2007) was an American record producer and lyricist.

He was director of A&R and sole producer at RCA Victor Records in the 1940s. He produced Perry Como's first hit records and signed Glenn Miller to his final contract. He wrote the lyrics for Rosemary Clooney's first hit, "The Kid's a Dreamer (The Kid from Fool's Paradise)," later a hit for Tony Bennett; also Johnnie Ray's “Coffee and Cigarettes,” Nat King Cole's "The Magic Tree" and "Hot Toddy," a hit for Ralph Flanagan, Ted Heath and Julie London, recorded by some eighty other artists. He created and managed the Ralph Flanagan Orchestra, which was greatly popular in the early 1950s and had many chart hits, and also managed the Buddy Morrow Orchestra.

Hendler was born in Philadelphia on June 17, 1918. He majored in journalism at the University of Southern California, later transferring to New York University. In the late 1950s he became administrative assistant to the president of Warner Bros. Records and was instrumental in launching Bob Newhart and The Everly Brothers. At Capitol Records in the 1960s, as vice president and general manager of Beechwood Music, Hendler signed up some 200 songwriters across the country and had more than a dozen top 40 hits. Among the groups he discovered and championed was The Association.

He became involved in musical theatre and wrote book and lyrics (with Roslyn Baws) for the rock musical Alison, a Haight-Ashbury Alice in Wonderland with music by many Beechwood songwriters including Larry Norman. Featuring Kay Cole (creator of the role of Maggie in A Chorus Line), Ted Neeley and Richard Hatch, it was presented in Los Angeles in 1968 and optioned for Broadway by his co-producer Hal James, producer of Man of La Mancha. In Boston in 1971 he co-produced and staged Hey Dad, Who Is This Guy Gershwin Anyway?, a colorful array of Gershwin tunes in rock style, and later George, Paul, Ringo, John and Gershwin, seamlessly melding the music of the Beatles and George Gershwin.

Hendler wrote the book and lyrics for Rock Carmen, which he co-produced and directed at the Roundhouse, London, in 1972, featuring Elaine Paige. He returned to London the next year as co-founder and executive director of the Franklin School of Contemporary Studies.

As an author, his books included Year by Year in the Rock Era, Greenwood/Praeger, 1983/1987, and How to Win the Lottery (co-author), Signet, London, 1994. In his last years he compiled a comprehensive survey of the parallels between Shakespeare and the Bible. He was a member of ASCAP and the Dramatists Guild. He died in New York City on October 16, 2007.
