= Billboard year-end top singles of 1946 =

Ranking of recorded music

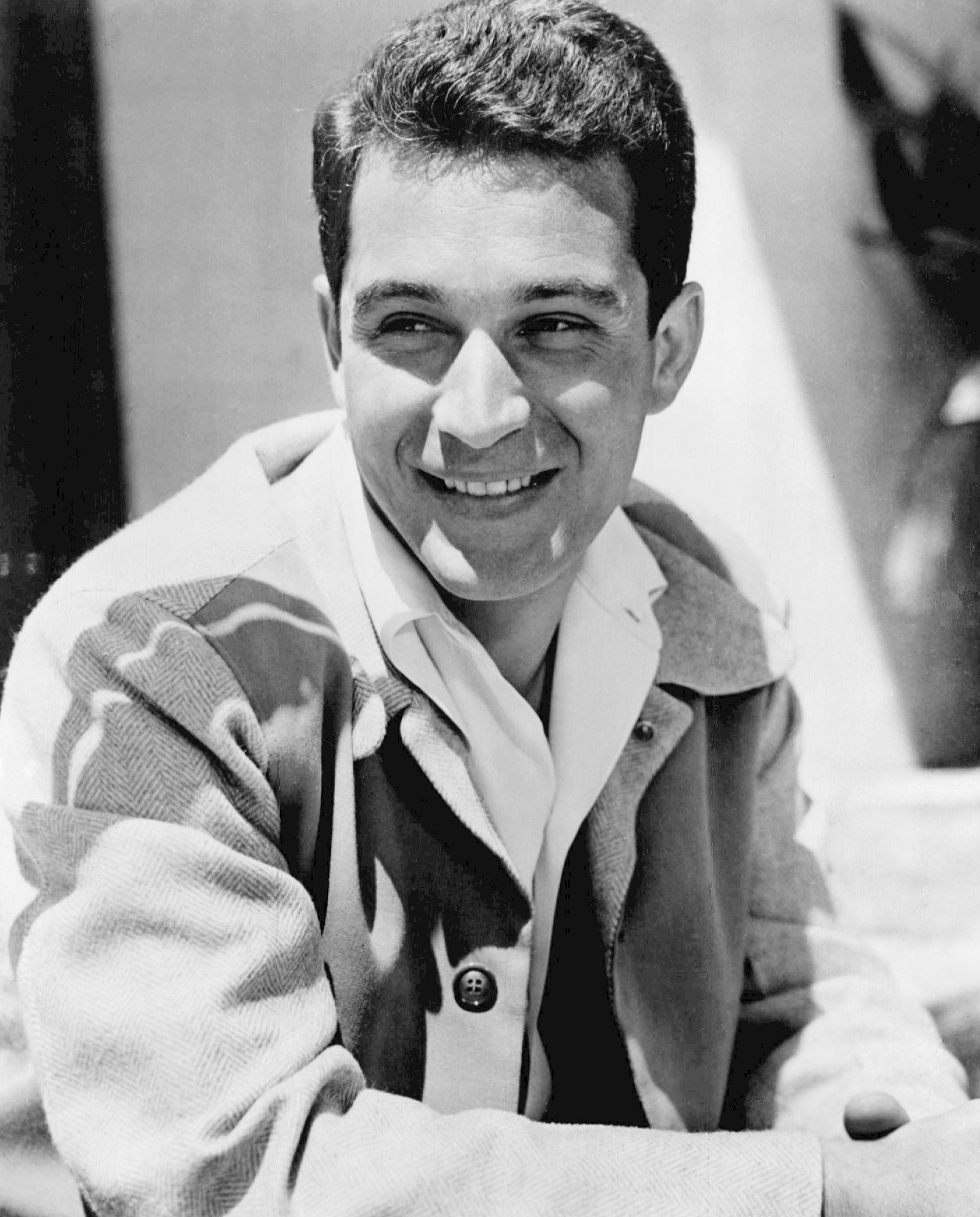
Perry Como had four songs on the year-end top singles list, including "Prisoner of Love", the number one song of 1946.

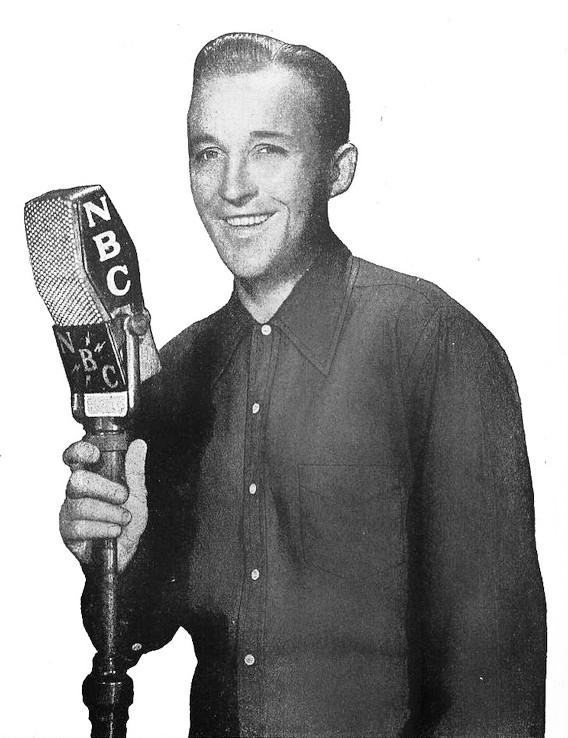
Bing Crosby had four songs on the year-end top singles list.

This is a list of Billboard magazine's top popular songs of 1946 according to retail sales.

No. (Rank)	Title	Artist(s)
1 (1)	"Prisoner of Love"	Perry Como
2 (2)	"To Each His Own"	Eddy Howard
3 (3)	"The Gypsy"	The Ink Spots
4 (4)	"Five Minutes More"	Frank Sinatra
5 (5)	"Rumors Are Flying"	Frankie Carle
6 (6)	"Oh! What It Seemed to Be"	Frankie Carle
7 (7)	"Personality"	Johnny Mercer and The Pied Pipers
8 (8)	"South America, Take It Away"	Bing Crosby and The Andrews Sisters
9 (9)	"The Gypsy"	Dinah Shore
10 (10)	"Oh! What It Seemed to Be"	Frank Sinatra
11 (11)	"Surrender"	Perry Como
12 (12)	"Doctor, Lawyer, Indian Chief"	Betty Hutton
13 (13)	"Let It Snow! Let It Snow! Let It Snow!"	Vaughn Monroe
14 (14)	"To Each His Own"	Freddy Martin
15 (15)	"Ole Buttermilk Sky"	Kay Kyser
16 (16)	"To Each His Own"	The Ink Spots
17 (17)	"Symphony"	Freddy Martin
18 (18)	"The Old Lamp-Lighter"	Sammy Kaye
19 (19)	"I Can't Begin to Tell You"	Bing Crosby and Carmen Cavallaro
19 (19)	"I'm a Big Girl Now"	Sammy Kaye
20 (21)	"Symphony"	Bing Crosby
21 (22)	"The Gypsy"	Sammy Kaye
21 (22)	"Doin' What Comes Natur'lly"	Dinah Shore with the Spade Cooley Orchestra
22 (24)	"Laughing on the Outside (Crying on the Inside)"	Dinah Shore
23 (25)	"Five Minutes More"	Tex Beneke with the Glenn Miller Orchestra
24 (26)	"Laughing on the Outside (Crying on the Inside)"	Andy Russell
25 (27)	"Hey! Ba-Ba-Re-Bop"	Tex Beneke with the Glenn Miller Orchestra
25 (27)	"They Say It's Wonderful"	Perry Como
25 (27)	"To Each His Own"	Tony Martin
26 (30)	"You Won't Be Satisfied (Until You Break My Heart)"	Les Brown
27 (31)	"Symphony"	Benny Goodman
28 (32)	"Oh! What It Seemed to Be"	Charlie Spivak
28 (32)	"Doin' What Comes Natur'lly"	Freddy Martin
28 (32)	"The Old Lamp-Lighter"	Kay Kyser
29 (35)	"Oh! What It Seemed to Be"	Dick Haymes and Helen Forrest
30 (36)	"Rumors Are Flying"	The Andrews Sisters and Les Paul Trio
31 (37)	"Dig You Later (A Hubba-Hubba-Hubba)"	Perry Como
32 (38)	"Symphony"	Jo Stafford
33 (39)	"To Each His Own"	The Modernaires and Paula Kelly
34 (40)	"Sioux City Sue"	Bing Crosby and the Jesters
35 (41)	"(I Love You) For Sentimental Reasons"	King Cole Trio

== See also ==
- 1946 in music
- List of Billboard number-one singles of 1946
- Billboard Most-Played Folk Records of 1946
- Billboard Most-Played Race Records of 1946
