= List of Billboard number-one singles of 1946 =

Prior to the introduction of the Hot 100, The Billboard compiled multiple weekly record charts ranking the performance of singles in the United States. In 1946, the magazine published the following four all-genre national singles charts:

- Best-Selling Popular Retail Records – ranked the most-sold singles in retail stores, as reported by merchants surveyed throughout the country. In the 21st century, Billboard designates Retail Records, in all its incarnations, as the magazine's canonical U.S. singles chart prior to August 1958.
- Records Most-Played on the Air – ranked the most-played songs on American radio stations, as reported by radio disc jockeys and radio stations.
- Most-Played Juke Box Records – ranked the most-played songs in jukeboxes across the United States, as reported by machine operators.
- Honor Roll of Hits – a composite ten-position song chart which combined data from the three charts above along with three other component charts. It served as The Billboard's lead chart until the introduction of the Hot 100 in 1958 and would remain in print until 1963.

Note: In the issues dated February 9, June 22, and October 12, The Billboard reported a tie for the number-one single on one of its charts.

Issue date	Best-Selling Popular Retail Records	Records Most-Played on the Air	Most-Played Juke Box Records	Honor Roll of Hits	Ref.
January 5	"Symphony"; Freddy Martin and His Orchestra with Clyde Rogers	"White Christmas"; Bing Crosby with the Ken Darby Singers and John Scott Trotter and His Orchestra	"I Can't Begin to Tell You"; Bing Crosby with Carmen Cavallaro	"Symphony"	
January 12	"Symphony"; Freddy Martin and His Orchestra with Clyde Rogers	"Symphony"; Freddy Martin and His Orchestra with Clyde Rogers	"I Can't Begin to Tell You"; Bing Crosby with Carmen Cavallaro	"Symphony"	
January 19	"I Can't Begin to Tell You"; Bing Crosby with Carmen Cavallaro	"Let It Snow! Let It Snow! Let It Snow!"; Vaughn Monroe and His Orchestra with Vaughn Monroe and the Norton Sisters	"I Can't Begin to Tell You"; Bing Crosby with Carmen Cavallaro	"Symphony"	
January 26	"Let It Snow! Let It Snow! Let It Snow!"; Vaughn Monroe and His Orchestra with Vaughn Monroe and the Norton Sisters	"Let It Snow! Let It Snow! Let It Snow!"; Vaughn Monroe and His Orchestra with Vaughn Monroe and the Norton Sisters	"I Can't Begin to Tell You"; Bing Crosby with Carmen Cavallaro	"Symphony"	
February 2	"Let It Snow! Let It Snow! Let It Snow!"; Vaughn Monroe and His Orchestra with Vaughn Monroe and the Norton Sisters	"Let It Snow! Let It Snow! Let It Snow!"; Vaughn Monroe and His Orchestra with Vaughn Monroe and the Norton Sisters	"I Can't Begin to Tell You"; Bing Crosby with Carmen Cavallaro	"Symphony"	
February 9	"Let It Snow! Let It Snow! Let It Snow!"; Vaughn Monroe and His Orchestra with Vaughn Monroe and the Norton Sisters	"Doctor, Lawyer, Indian Chief"; Betty Hutton with Paul Weston and His Orchestra "Let It Snow! Let It Snow! Let It Snow!"; Vaughn Monroe and His Orchestra with Vaughn Monroe and the Norton Sisters	"Let It Snow! Let It Snow! Let It Snow!"; Vaughn Monroe and His Orchestra with Vaughn Monroe and the Norton Sisters	"Symphony"	
February 16	"Let It Snow! Let It Snow! Let It Snow!"; Vaughn Monroe and His Orchestra with Vaughn Monroe and the Norton Sisters	"Let It Snow! Let It Snow! Let It Snow!"; Vaughn Monroe and His Orchestra with Vaughn Monroe and the Norton Sisters	"Let It Snow! Let It Snow! Let It Snow!"; Vaughn Monroe and His Orchestra with Vaughn Monroe and the Norton Sisters	"Symphony"	
February 23	"Let It Snow! Let It Snow! Let It Snow!"; Vaughn Monroe and His Orchestra with Vaughn Monroe and the Norton Sisters	"Let It Snow! Let It Snow! Let It Snow!"; Vaughn Monroe and His Orchestra with Vaughn Monroe and the Norton Sisters	"Let It Snow! Let It Snow! Let It Snow!"; Vaughn Monroe and His Orchestra with Vaughn Monroe and the Norton Sisters	"Symphony"	
March 2	"Doctor, Lawyer, Indian Chief"; Betty Hutton with Paul Weston and His Orchestra	"Personality"; Johnny Mercer and the Pied Pipers with Paul Weston and His Orchestra	"Let It Snow! Let It Snow! Let It Snow!"; Vaughn Monroe and His Orchestra with Vaughn Monroe and the Norton Sisters	"Symphony"	
March 9	"Personality"; Johnny Mercer and the Pied Pipers with Paul Weston and His Orchestra	"Doctor, Lawyer, Indian Chief"; Betty Hutton with Paul Weston and His Orchestra	"Let It Snow! Let It Snow! Let It Snow!"; Vaughn Monroe and His Orchestra with Vaughn Monroe and the Norton Sisters	"Oh! What It Seemed to Be"	
March 16	"Oh! What It Seemed to Be"; Frankie Carle and His Orchestra with Marjorie Hughes	"Personality"; Johnny Mercer and the Pied Pipers with Paul Weston and His Orchestra	"Oh! What It Seemed to Be"; Frankie Carle and His Orchestra with Marjorie Hughes	"Oh! What It Seemed to Be"	
March 23	"Oh! What It Seemed to Be"; Frankie Carle and His Orchestra with Marjorie Hughes	"Oh! What It Seemed to Be"; Frank Sinatra	"Oh! What It Seemed to Be"; Frankie Carle and His Orchestra with Marjorie Hughes	"Oh! What It Seemed to Be"	
March 30	"Oh! What It Seemed to Be"; Frankie Carle and His Orchestra with Marjorie Hughes	"Oh! What It Seemed to Be"; Frank Sinatra	"Oh! What It Seemed to Be"; Frankie Carle and His Orchestra with Marjorie Hughes	"Oh! What It Seemed to Be"	
April 6	"Oh! What It Seemed to Be"; Frankie Carle and His Orchestra with Marjorie Hughes	"Oh! What It Seemed to Be"; Frank Sinatra	"Oh! What It Seemed to Be"; Frankie Carle and His Orchestra with Marjorie Hughes	"Oh! What It Seemed to Be"	
April 13	"Oh! What It Seemed to Be"; Frankie Carle and His Orchestra with Marjorie Hughes	"Oh! What It Seemed to Be"; Frank Sinatra	"Oh! What It Seemed to Be"; Frankie Carle and His Orchestra with Marjorie Hughes	"Oh! What It Seemed to Be"	
April 20	"Oh! What It Seemed to Be"; Frankie Carle and His Orchestra with Marjorie Hughes	"Oh! What It Seemed to Be"; Frank Sinatra	"Oh! What It Seemed to Be"; Frankie Carle and His Orchestra with Marjorie Hughes	"Oh! What It Seemed to Be"	
April 27	"I'm a Big Girl Now"; Swing and Sway with Sammy Kaye with Betty Barclay	"Oh! What It Seemed to Be"; Frank Sinatra	"Oh! What It Seemed to Be"; Frankie Carle and His Orchestra with Marjorie Hughes	"Oh! What It Seemed to Be"	
May 4	"Prisoner of Love"; Perry Como with Russ Case and His Orchestra	"Oh! What It Seemed to Be"; Frank Sinatra	"Oh! What It Seemed to Be"; Frankie Carle and His Orchestra with Marjorie Hughes	"Oh! What It Seemed to Be"	
May 11	"Prisoner of Love"; Perry Como with Russ Case and His Orchestra	"Oh! What It Seemed to Be"; Frank Sinatra	"Oh! What It Seemed to Be"; Frankie Carle and His Orchestra with Marjorie Hughes	"Oh! What It Seemed to Be"	
May 18	"Prisoner of Love"; Perry Como with Russ Case and His Orchestra	"The Gypsy"; Dinah Shore	"Oh! What It Seemed to Be"; Frankie Carle and His Orchestra with Marjorie Hughes	"Laughing on the Outside (Crying on the Inside)"	
May 25	"The Gypsy"; The Ink Spots	"The Gypsy"; Dinah Shore	"Oh! What It Seemed to Be"; Frankie Carle and His Orchestra with Marjorie Hughes	"The Gypsy"	
June 1	"The Gypsy"; The Ink Spots	"Prisoner of Love"; Perry Como with Russ Case and His Orchestra	"The Gypsy"; The Ink Spots	"The Gypsy"	
June 8	"The Gypsy"; The Ink Spots	"The Gypsy"; Dinah Shore	"The Gypsy"; The Ink Spots	"The Gypsy"	
June 15	"The Gypsy"; The Ink Spots	"The Gypsy"; Dinah Shore	"The Gypsy"; The Ink Spots	"The Gypsy"	
June 22	"The Gypsy"; The Ink Spots	"The Gypsy"; Dinah Shore "The Gypsy"; The Ink Spots	"The Gypsy"; The Ink Spots	"The Gypsy"	
June 29	"The Gypsy"; The Ink Spots	"The Gypsy"; Dinah Shore	"The Gypsy"; The Ink Spots	"The Gypsy"	
July 6	"The Gypsy"; The Ink Spots	"The Gypsy"; The Ink Spots	"The Gypsy"; The Ink Spots	"The Gypsy"	
July 13	"The Gypsy"; The Ink Spots	"The Gypsy"; Dinah Shore	"The Gypsy"; The Ink Spots	"The Gypsy"	
July 20	"The Gypsy"; The Ink Spots	"Prisoner of Love"; Perry Como with Russ Case and His Orchestra	"The Gypsy"; The Ink Spots	"The Gypsy"	
July 27	"The Gypsy"; The Ink Spots	"The Gypsy"; Dinah Shore	"The Gypsy"; The Ink Spots	"The Gypsy"	
August 3	"Surrender"; Perry Como with Russ Case and His Orchestra	"To Each His Own"; Eddy Howard and His Orchestra with Eddy Howard and Trio	"The Gypsy"; The Ink Spots	"The Gypsy"	
August 10	"To Each His Own"; Eddy Howard and His Orchestra with Eddy Howard and Trio	"To Each His Own"; Eddy Howard and His Orchestra with Eddy Howard and Trio	"The Gypsy"; The Ink Spots	"The Gypsy"	
August 17	"To Each His Own"; Eddy Howard and His Orchestra with Eddy Howard and Trio	"To Each His Own"; Eddy Howard and His Orchestra with Eddy Howard and Trio	"The Gypsy"; The Ink Spots	"To Each His Own"	
August 24	"To Each His Own"; Eddy Howard and His Orchestra with Eddy Howard and Trio	"To Each His Own"; Eddy Howard and His Orchestra with Eddy Howard and Trio	"The Gypsy"; The Ink Spots	"To Each His Own"	
August 31	"To Each His Own"; Freddy Martin and His Orchestra with Stuart Wade	"To Each His Own"; Eddy Howard and His Orchestra with Eddy Howard and Trio	"To Each His Own"; Eddy Howard and His Orchestra with Eddy Howard and Trio	"To Each His Own"	
September 7	"To Each His Own"; Freddy Martin and His Orchestra with Stuart Wade	"To Each His Own"; Eddy Howard and His Orchestra with Eddy Howard and Trio	"To Each His Own"; Eddy Howard and His Orchestra with Eddy Howard and Trio	"To Each His Own"	
September 14	"Five Minutes More"; Frank Sinatra	"To Each His Own"; Eddy Howard and His Orchestra with Eddy Howard and Trio	"To Each His Own"; Eddy Howard and His Orchestra with Eddy Howard and Trio	"To Each His Own"	
September 21	"To Each His Own"; The Ink Spots	"To Each His Own"; Eddy Howard and His Orchestra with Eddy Howard and Trio	"Five Minutes More"; Frank Sinatra	"To Each His Own"	
September 28	"Five Minutes More"; Frank Sinatra	"Five Minutes More"; Frank Sinatra	"Five Minutes More"; Frank Sinatra	"To Each His Own"	
October 5	"To Each His Own"; Eddy Howard and His Orchestra with Eddy Howard and Trio	"Five Minutes More"; Frank Sinatra	"To Each His Own"; Eddy Howard and His Orchestra with Eddy Howard and Trio	"To Each His Own"	
October 12	"To Each His Own"; Eddy Howard and His Orchestra with Eddy Howard and Trio	"Five Minutes More"; Frank Sinatra	"Five Minutes More"; Frank Sinatra "To Each His Own"; Eddy Howard and His Orchestra with Eddy Howard and Trio	"To Each His Own"	
October 19	"Rumors Are Flying"; Frankie Carle and His Orchestra with Marjorie Hughes	"Five Minutes More"; Frank Sinatra	"To Each His Own"; Eddy Howard and His Orchestra with Eddy Howard and Trio	"To Each His Own"	
October 26	"Rumors Are Flying"; Frankie Carle and His Orchestra with Marjorie Hughes	"Rumors Are Flying"; Frankie Carle and His Orchestra with Marjorie Hughes	"Rumors Are Flying"; Frankie Carle and His Orchestra with Marjorie Hughes	"To Each His Own"	
November 2	"Rumors Are Flying"; Frankie Carle and His Orchestra with Marjorie Hughes	"Rumors Are Flying"; Frankie Carle and His Orchestra with Marjorie Hughes	"Rumors Are Flying"; Frankie Carle and His Orchestra with Marjorie Hughes	"Rumors Are Flying"	
November 9	"Rumors Are Flying"; Frankie Carle and His Orchestra with Marjorie Hughes	"Rumors Are Flying"; Frankie Carle and His Orchestra with Marjorie Hughes	"Rumors Are Flying"; Frankie Carle and His Orchestra with Marjorie Hughes	"Rumors Are Flying"	
November 16	"Rumors Are Flying"; Frankie Carle and His Orchestra with Marjorie Hughes	"Rumors Are Flying"; Frankie Carle and His Orchestra with Marjorie Hughes	"Rumors Are Flying"; Frankie Carle and His Orchestra with Marjorie Hughes	"Rumors Are Flying"	
November 23	"Rumors Are Flying"; Frankie Carle and His Orchestra with Marjorie Hughes	"Rumors Are Flying"; Frankie Carle and His Orchestra with Marjorie Hughes	"Rumors Are Flying"; Frankie Carle and His Orchestra with Marjorie Hughes	"Rumors Are Flying"	
November 30	"Rumors Are Flying"; Frankie Carle and His Orchestra with Marjorie Hughes	"Rumors Are Flying"; Frankie Carle and His Orchestra with Marjorie Hughes	"Rumors Are Flying"; Frankie Carle and His Orchestra with Marjorie Hughes	"Rumors Are Flying"	
December 7	"Rumors Are Flying"; Frankie Carle and His Orchestra with Marjorie Hughes	"Rumors Are Flying"; Frankie Carle and His Orchestra with Marjorie Hughes	"Rumors Are Flying"; Frankie Carle and His Orchestra with Marjorie Hughes	"Rumors Are Flying"	
December 14	"Ole Buttermilk Sky"; Kay Kyser and His Orchestra with Michael Douglas and the Campus Kids	"Rumors Are Flying"; Frankie Carle and His Orchestra with Marjorie Hughes	"Rumors Are Flying"; Frankie Carle and His Orchestra with Marjorie Hughes	"Ole Buttermilk Sky"	
December 21	"Ole Buttermilk Sky"; Kay Kyser and His Orchestra with Michael Douglas and the Campus Kids	"Rumors Are Flying"; Frankie Carle and His Orchestra with Marjorie Hughes	"The Old Lamp-Lighter"; Swing and Sway with Sammy Kaye with Billy Williams	"The Old Lamp-Lighter"	
December 28	"The Old Lamp-Lighter"; Swing and Sway with Sammy Kaye with Billy Williams	"(I Love You) For Sentimental Reasons"; The King Cole Trio	"The Old Lamp-Lighter"; Swing and Sway with Sammy Kaye with Billy Williams	"The Old Lamp-Lighter"	

== Number-one artists ==
List of number-one artists by total weeks at number one
Artist	Weeks at #1
Frankie Carle	14
The Ink Spots	11
Eddy Howard	5
Vaughn Monroe	5
Freddy Martin	4
Perry Como	4
Frank Sinatra	2
Kay Kyser	2
Sammy Kaye	2
Bing Crosby	1
Betty Hutton	1
Johnny Mercer	1

== See also ==
- 1946 in music
