= 1944 in radio =

The year 1944 saw a number of significant happenings in radio broadcasting history.

== Events ==
R. Ernest Dupuy reads Communiqué Number One of SHAEF announcing the Normandy landings

- 11 January – Fireside chat by the President of the United States: State of the Union Message to Congress.
- 6 March – The BBC in the United Kingdom transmits a ballad opera, The Man Who Went to War, concerning an African American soldier, written by Langston Hughes and D. G. Bridson and presented by Paul Robeson.
- 28 March – New York City classical music radio station WQXR (later WFME) bans singing commercials from being broadcast on its station.
- 30 April – (Six days before) The American Broadcasting Station in Europe (ABSIE) is established, transmitting from the United Kingdom in English, German, French, Dutch, Danish, and Norwegian to resistance movements in mainland Europe.
- 5 June
  - Fireside chat: On the Fall of Rome.
  - One day before D-Day, the BBC transmits coded messages (including the second line of a poem by Paul Verlaine) from Britain to underground resistance fighters in France warning that the invasion of Europe is about to begin.
- 6 June – D-Day: United States Army Colonel R. Ernest Dupuy, news chief to Supreme Headquarters Allied Expeditionary Force, officially announces today's Normandy landings on radio in a broadcast at 3:32 am Eastern War Time (12:32 am Pacific Time). BBC reports of the landings are carried by around 725 of the 914 broadcasting stations in the United States.
- 7 June – BBC Allied Expeditionary Forces Programme begins broadcasting to troops of the Supreme Headquarters Allied Expeditionary Force in Europe on 14 metres (583 kHz) providing a program dominated by cabaret and swing music.
- 12 June – Fireside chat: Opening Fifth War Loan Drive (last fireside chat).
- 21 July (01:00) – Following failure of the 20 July plot to assassinate Adolf Hitler he makes a 6-minute broadcast on German radio (at 10 minutes notice). Beginning in an uncharacteristically subdued manner, he states "I regard this as a confirmation of the task imposed on me by Providence to continue to pursue my life purpose". Heinrich Himmler is given additional powers. Karl Dönitz and Hermann Göring also speak.
- 25 July – The New York Times acquires the Interstate Broadcasting Company, parent of WQXR (later WFME) and WQXQ-FM (later WQXR; frequency becomes home to WXNY-FM) from John V. L. Hogan for $1 million American dollars. The Times will program the AM station until December 1998, and own the FM station until October 2009.
- 26 October – With fascism defeated in most parts of Italy, the national broadcasting organization Ente Italiano per le Audizioni Radiofoniche (EIAR) is overhauled and renamed Radio Audizioni Italiane (RAI), the future Radiotelevisione Italiana.
- 10 December – Italian conductor Arturo Toscanini leads a concert performance of the first half of Beethoven's Fidelio (minus its spoken dialogue) in German on NBC Radio in the United States, starring Rose Bampton. He chooses this opera for its political message: a statement against tyranny and dictatorship, intending it as a tribute to the German people who are being oppressed by Hitler. The second half is broadcast a week later. The performance is later released on LP and CD, the first of 7 operas that Toscanini conducts on radio.

== Debuts ==
- (undated) – The Count of Monte Cristo debuts on the Don Lee Network.
- 5 January – The Frank Sinatra Show debuts on CBS.
- 18 January – Everything for the Boys debuts on NBC.
- 25 January – The black maid character Beulah, played by white male actor Marlin Hurt, debuts on Fibber McGee and Molly. In 1945, Beulah received her own spin-off show.
- 15 February – Creeps by Night debuted on the Blue Network.
- 7 March – Columbia Presents Corwin, hosted by Norman Corwin, debuts on CBS.
- 19 April – Arthur Hopkins Presents debuts on NBC.
- 23 April – The Adventures of Bill Lance debuts on CBS West Coast network.
- 5 May – The American Women's Jury debuts on Mutual.
- 20 May – Eddie Condon's Jazz Concerts debuts on the Blue Network.
- June – War Report debuts on the BBC.
- 13 June – The Charlotte Greenwood Show debuts on NBC.
- 20 June – The Dick Haymes Show debuts on NBC.
- 23 June – Boston Blackie debuts on NBC.
- 28 June – The Alan Young Show debuts on NBC.
- 13 August – The Jackie Gleason-Les Tremayne Show debuts on NBC.
- 31 August – The Frank Morgan Show debuts on NBC.
- 8 September - Happy Island debuts on Blue Network.
- 20 September – The Electric Hour debuts on CBS.
- 8 October – The Adventures of Ozzie and Harriet debuts on CBS.
- 11 December – The Chesterfield Supper Club debuts on NBC.

== Closings ==
- 8 January - Foreign Assignment ends its run on network radio (Mutual).
- 14 January - The Black Hood ends its run on network radio (Mutual).
- 2 February - Battle of the Sexes ends its run on network radio (NBC).
- 26 February - Campana Serenade ends its run on network radio (CBS).
- 4 March - The Man Behind the Gun ends its run on network radio (CBS).
- 30 April - Ceiling Unlimited ends its run on network radio (CBS).
- 30 May - Cresta Blanca Carnival ends its run on network radio (CBS)
- 5 June - Ed Sullivan Entertains ends its run on network radio (CBS).
- 23 June - American Women ends its run on network radio (CBS).
- 26 June - Broadway Showtime ends its run on network radio (CBS).
- 30 June - Brave Tomorrow ends its run on network radio (NBC).
- 5 August - Blue Ribbon Town ends its run on network radio (CBS).
- 15 August - Creeps by Night ends its run on network radio (Blue Network).
- 2 September - Abie's Irish Rose ends its run on network radio (NBC).
- 22 September - Helpmate ends its run on network radio (NBC).
- 24 September - Deadline Dramas ends its run on network radio (Blue Network).
- 21 October - Babe Ruth ends its run on network radio (NBC).
- 22 October - The Jackie Gleason-Les Tremayne Show ends its run on network radio (NBC).
- 19 November - Hot Copy ends its run on network radio (NBC-Blue.
- (undated) - The Black Castle (radio program) ends its run on network radio (Mutual).

== Births ==
- 7 January – Jim Bohannon, American television and radio personality and nationally syndicated talk show host
- 28 March – Rick Barry, American former NBA player and broadcaster
- 12 May – Brian Kay, English bass singer and radio music presenter
- 5 June – Nigel Rees, English radio broadcaster
- 24 August – Mike Barnicle, American long-time newspaper writer and radio personality based in Boston
- 8 October – Dale Dye, American actor, technical advisor, radio personality and writer
- 24 October – Dr. Joy Browne, American radio psychologist syndicated by the WOR Radio Network (d. 2016)
- 28 October – Gerry Anderson, Northern Irish radio broadcaster (died 2014)
- November – Jim Eldridge, English scriptwriter
- 25 December – Kenny Everett, born Maurice Cole, British DJ (died 1995)
- 31 December – Neil Ross, British-American voice actor
- Christine Craft, American radio talk show host, previously television anchorperson

== Deaths ==
- 28 June – Philippe Henriot, 55, Vichy French propaganda broadcaster and writer (assassinated)
- 31 August – Max Otto Koischwitz, 42, German American Nazi propagandist
- 16 November – Boake Carter, 45, American news commentator since the 1930s
