= South America, Take It Away =

1946 hit song

Single by Bing Crosby and the Andrews Sisters featuring Vic Schoen and His Orchestra
- B-side: "(Get Your Kicks on) Route 66"
- Released: June 1946
- Genre: Latin jazz; rumba
- Length: 3:06
- Label: Decca
- Songwriter: Harold Rome

Bing Crosby singles chronology
"They Say It's Wonderful" (1946)	"South America, Take It Away" (1946)	"Night and Day" (1946)

The Andrews Sisters singles chronology
"Coax Me a Little Bit" (1946)	"South America, Take It Away" (1946)	"I Don't Know Why" (1946)

"South America, Take It Away"

Single by Xavier Cugat and His Waldorf-Astoria Orchestra featuring Buddy Clark
- B-side: "Chiquita Banana"
- Genre: Latin jazz; rumba
- Length: 2:49
- Label: Columbia
- Songwriter: Harold Rome

Xavier Cugat singles chronology
"You Belong to My Heart" (1945)	"South America, Take It Away" (1946)	"Cuanto Le Gusta" (1949)

"South America, Take It Away" is a 1946 popular song written by Harold Rome for Call Me Mister, and made popular by Bing Crosby and The Andrews Sisters.

== Lyrics and composition ==
"South America, Take It Away" was written for Call Me Mister, a 1946 Broadway revue that touches on the post- war infatuation with Latin and Latin-American music and culture in the United States, which would go on to spawn and influence numerous hit songs throughout the latter half of the 1940s and early 50s.

It is a traditional pop song that combines elements of swing and jazz with latin jazz and rumba, and serves as a tribute to "our grand South American neighbors" and their "beautiful lands," and an appreciation of their genres of music like samba, conga, and the aforementioned rumba. The narrator claims that South American music styles are "leaving [him] aching," with "more bumps than a cucumber," "cracked hips," and an "outta-whack spine," insinuating that they are difficult to dance to and require a lot of moving, suggesting "Maybe Latins in their middles are built stronger." Some of the lyrics are vague and up to interpretation, and much of the song consists of nonsense or stylish adlibs.

== Chart success and critical reception ==
Crosby's version with the Andrews Sisters, with backing done by Vic Schoen, ascended to No. 2 on Billboard's Best Sellers in Stores list in the summer of 1946 (blocked by Frankie Carle's "Rumors Are Flying"), spending 7 weeks in the top ten, and ranking by the magazine as the 8th biggest song of the year. Cashbox called the record "a must for the music boxes."

The second most popular of the only two charting versions was released by Xavier Cugat & His Waldorf-Astoria Orchestra, with Buddy Clark on vocals. It reached No. 9 on the Best Sellers List, charting for three weeks in total. Billboard called this version "a bright and breezy satire on Latin dance steps" with "exciting rhythms" that "give foil meaning to the lyrical frames" and "make it a pre-sold platter for the play." Band Leaders wrote of it, "With the Cugat chorus giving vocal help and maestro providing catchy musical setting, it's plenty attractive for the satirical "Call Me Mister" show ditty."

== Other versions ==
- Betty Garrett
- George Paxton and Rosemary Calvin (reviewed by Billboard on August 31, 1946)
- Mel Tormé and the Mel-Tones (reviewed by Billboard on July 20, 1946)
- Monica Lewis and Ray Black (reviewed by Billboard on December 14, 1946)
