= Bennie Benjamin =

American songwriter (1907–1989)

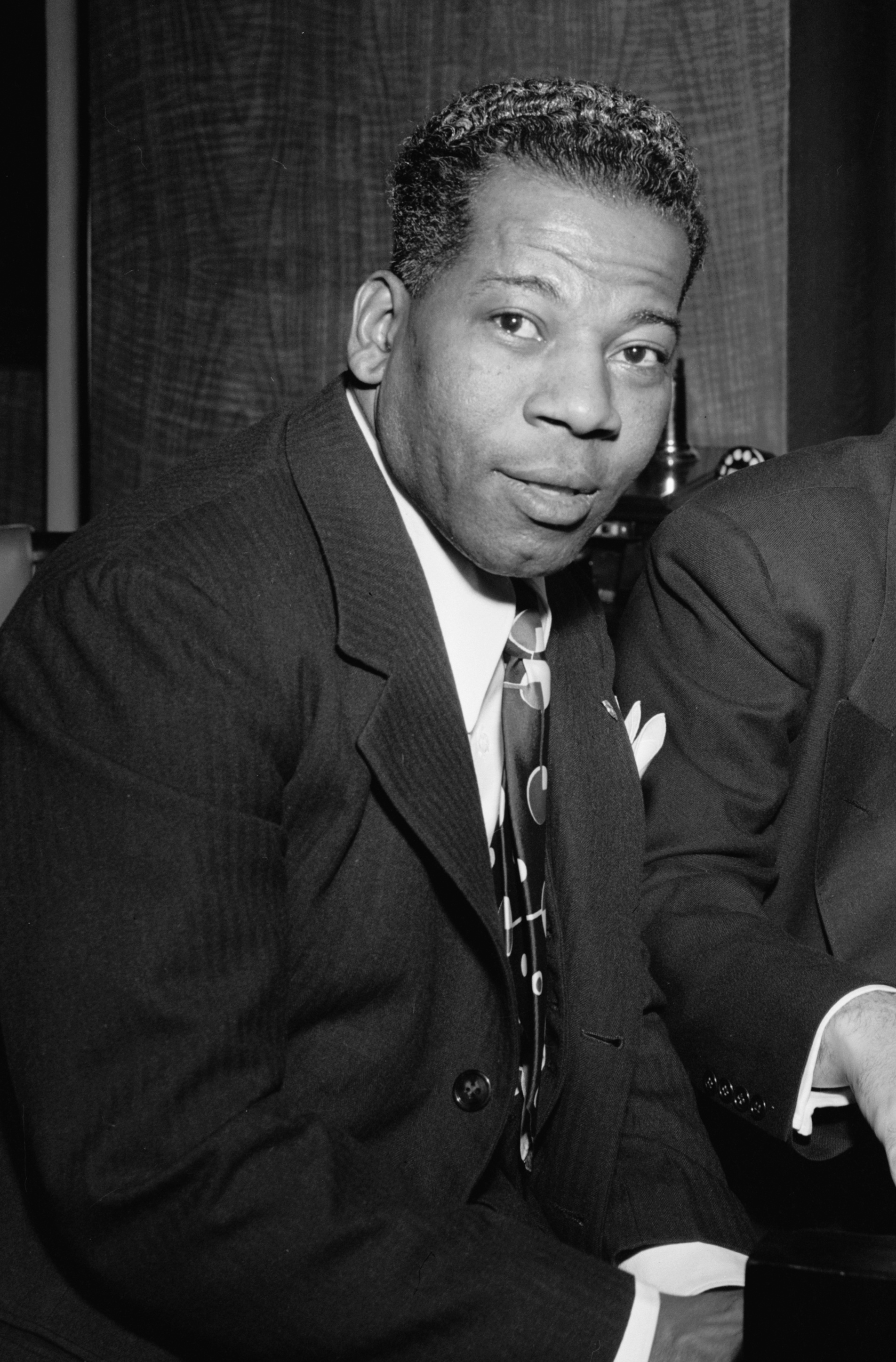
- Benjamin in 1947; by William P. Gottlieb

Background information
- Born: Claude August Benjamin; November 4, 1907; Christiansted, Saint Croix, Danish West Indies
- Died: May 2, 1989 (aged 81) New York City, U.S.
- Genres: Traditional pop
- Occupations: Musician; songwriter
- Instruments: Banjo; Guitar
- Years active: 1930s–1980s

Claude August "Bennie" Benjamin (November 4, 1907 – May 2, 1989) was a Virgin Islands–born American songwriter. He had particularly successful songwriting partnerships with Sol Marcus, with whom he wrote "I Don't Want to Set the World on Fire", "When the Lights Go On Again (All Over the World)", and "Don't Let Me Be Misunderstood"; and with George David Weiss, with whom he wrote "Oh! What It Seemed to Be" and "Wheel of Fortune". Most of his songs were in the traditional pop idiom.

== Early life ==
Benjamin was born in Christiansted, on the island of Saint Croix, then part of the Danish West Indies (later within the United States Virgin Islands). As his family did not have sufficient funds to allow him to train as a minister, he trained as a tailor and cabinetmaker before moving to New York City in 1927.

== Music career ==
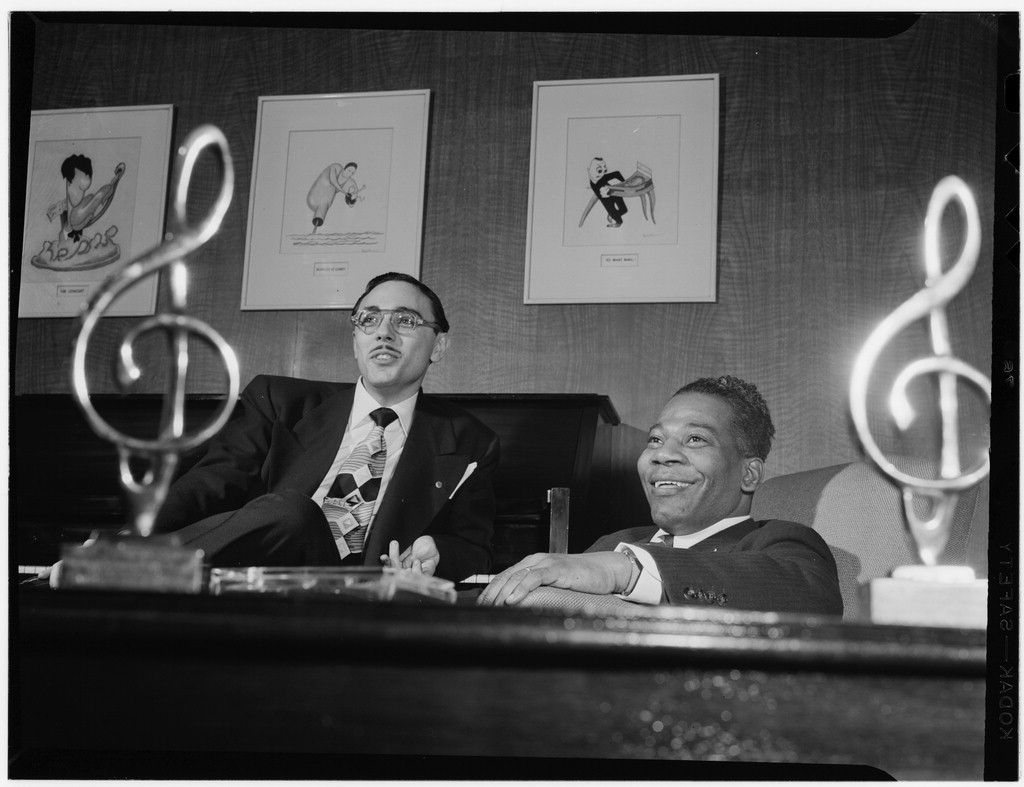
Benjamin (right) with George David Weiss in their New York office, 1947; by William P. Gottlieb

Benjamin studied banjo and guitar at Hy Smith's School of Music, developing a distinctive playing style, and began performing in dance bands. He played guitar and banjo with various orchestras at the Savoy Ballroom and the Cotton Club, and elsewhere, and toured with Olsen and Johnson. Although he wrote songs and attempted to sell them, he had little success until starting work at a music publishing firm and forming a songwriting partnership in the mid-1930s with New York–born composer Sol Marcus (1912–1976). With Marcus, Eddie Durham, and Eddie Seiler (1911–1952), he wrote "I Don't Want to Set the World on Fire"; it was first recorded in 1941 by Harlan Leonard and his Kansas City Rockers, and then more successfully by The Ink Spots, whose version reached number 4 on the pop chart, and Horace Heidt, whose recording rose to number 1. The song won Billboard's Top Songwriter's Award for 1941. Benjamin, Marcus, and Seiler then wrote a second number 1 hit, "When the Lights Go On Again (All Over the World)", recorded by Vaughn Monroe and associated in Britain with Vera Lynn.

In 1942, Benjamin enlisted in the U.S. Army, and performed in and produced entertainment shows. After returning to civilian life, he joined with lyricist George David Weiss and established a second successful songwriting partnership with him. The pair wrote some twenty hit songs over the next decade. Their early successes included "Oh! What It Seemed to Be", a 1946 hit for Frank Sinatra, Frankie Carle, and others; Perry Como's number 1 hit "Surrender"; and "Rumors Are Flying", a number 1 hit in 1946 for Frankie Carle and also a hit for The Andrews Sisters and others. They also wrote together for the Disney films Fun and Fancy Free and Melody Time. Later hits written by Benjamin and Weiss included "I Don't See Me in Your Eyes Anymore" (recorded by the Stardusters and Perry Como); "I'll Never Be Free" (a pop hit as a duet between Tennessee Ernie Ford and Kay Starr and an R&B hit for both Dinah Washington and Louis Jordan); "Can Anyone Explain? (No! No! No!)" (Ames Brothers); and "These Things I Offer You (for a Lifetime)" (by Benjamin, Weiss, and Morty Nevins, recorded by Sarah Vaughan). In 1952, Benjamin and Weiss wrote one of their most successful songs, "Wheel of Fortune", a number 1 hit for Kay Starr which sold over one million copies and provided the theme for a TV show.

Although Benjamin and Weiss continued to work together, their hits became less frequent and their working partnership ended in 1955. Benjamin then began working again with Sol Marcus, and the pair wrote "Lonely Man", recorded by Elvis Presley, and several songs recorded by Nina Simone, including "Don't Let Me Be Misunderstood". The song was co-credited to Benjamin, Marcus, and Gloria Caldwell, the wife of songwriter Horace Ott. It was recorded by Simone in 1964 and was later a hit for The Animals.

Having first established a publishing company with Perry Como in 1950, Benjamin became more active as a music publisher in the 1960s and set up Benjamin Publishing in 1965 and Bennie Benjamin Music in 1968. He was actively involved in ASCAP, winning an award for "I'll Never Be Free" in 1979, and was on the Council of the American Guild of Authors and Composers. He was inducted into the Songwriters Hall of Fame in 1984.

== Later life and death ==
In later life, Benjamin became an active investor in the U.S. Virgin Islands and became a major stockholder in the West Indies Bank and Trust. He also became known for his charitable activities, particularly in healthcare in the Virgin Islands.

He was married to Martha Flores from 1944 until her death in 1983.

He died in New York City on May 2, 1989, after a long illness. The Benjamin Foundation was established upon his death. As of 2024, it has contributed over three million dollars to Virgin Islands healthcare.

== Notable songs ==
With Sol Marcus, Ed Durham, and Ed Seiler
- "Cancel the Flowers"
- 1938: "I Don't Want to Set the World on Fire"
- "Strictly Instrumental"
- 1942: "When the Lights Go On Again (All Over the World)"
- "Forever, My Darling"

With George David Weiss

- 1950: "Can Anyone Explain? (No! No! No!)"
- "Can't Wait"
- 1947: "Confess"
- 1945: "Cross over the Bridge"
- 1950: "Echoes"
- 1947: "Fun and Fancy Free" from Fun and Fancy Free
- 1955: "How Important Can It Be?"
- 1949: "I Don't See Me in Your Eyes Anymore"
- 1950: "I'll Never Be Free"
- "I Ran All the Way Home"
- "Jet"
- 1946: "Rumors Are Flying"
- 1946: "Surrender"
- "To Think You've Chosen Me"
- 1951: "Wheel of Fortune"
- "Moonlight Mystery"
- "I'm Gonna Hate Myself in the Morning"
- "That Christmas Feeling"
- "Out of Breath"

with Sol Marcus

- "Always On My Mind"
- 1964: "Don't Let Me Be Misunderstood"
- "How Can I?"
- "I Am Blessed"
- "Of This I'm Sure"
- "Our Love (Will See Us Through)"
- "Don't Take All Night"
- "I Love Your Lovin' Ways"
- "Why Keep On Breaking My Heart"
- "A Pair of Fools"
- "Fabulous Character"
- 1961: "Lonely Man"

With others

- "Anyone (Could Fall in Love with You)"
