= Can Anyone Explain? (No! No! No!) =

Single by The Ames Brothers
- B-side: "Sittin' N' Starin' 'n Rockin'"
- Published: 1950
- Released: 1950
- Length: 3:06
- Label: Coral
- Songwriters: Bennie Benjamin, George David Weiss

The Ames Brothers singles chronology
| "Hoop-Dee-Doo" (1950) | "Can Anyone Explain? (No! No! No!)" (1950) | "Rag Mop" (1950) |

"Can Anyone Explain? (No! No! No!)" is a popular song written by Bennie Benjamin and George David Weiss and published in 1950.

The biggest hit version of the song was recorded by the Ames Brothers. The recording was made on May 17, 1950, and released by Coral Records as catalog number 60253. The record first reached the Billboard chart on August 4, 1950, and lasted 19 weeks on the chart, peaking at number five.

Another version which made the chart was by Ray Anthony's orchestra (vocal: Ronnie Deauville and The Skyliners). The recording was released by Capitol Records as catalog number 1131. The record reached the Billboard chart on September 2, 1950, and lasted 13 weeks on the charts, also peaking at number five.

Other versions that appeared on the singles chart:

- Dinah Shore on July 25, 1950, and released by Columbia Records as catalog number 38927. Shore's was number 29, charting one week on September 16, 1950.
- Ella Fitzgerald and Louis Armstrong, was recorded on August 25, 1950, and released by Decca Records as catalog number 27209. Theirs charted November 18, 1950 at number 30 for one week.
- Vic Damone charted October 14, 1950 at number 25 for one week on Mercury 5477.
- Larry Green and his Orchestra (vocal: The Honeydreamers) charted October 21, 1950 at number 28 for one week on RCA Victor 47-3902.
- Dick Haymes with Four Hits and a Miss on September 9, 1950, for two weeks, peaking at number 23 on Decca 27161.

== Other versions ==
- Gene Ammons - recorded for Chess Records (catalog No. 1433) in August 1950.
- Jimmy Dorsey and his Orchestra. Included on the album Can Anyone Explain (1984).
- Coleman Hawkins and his Quartet - recorded August 25, 1950.
- Jan & Kjeld (1960)
