= David Young (radio producer/director) =

American radio director

- Born: David Roberts Young; November 4, 1911; Sacramento, California, U.S.
- Died: November 3, 1969 (aged 57); San Diego, California, U.S.
- Resting place: El Camino Memorial Park
- Education: Polytechnical Elementary and Junior High School, Coronado High School, Pasadena Community Playhouse School of Theater
- Occupations: Radio director and producer
- Spouses: Vivian Merrill (m. 1936; div. 1966); Dorothy M. Dodge (m. 1968)
- Children: 2

David Roberts Young (November 4, 1911 – November 3, 1969) was an American director, producer and actor, in radio and on the stage, known as the longtime director of Family Theater.

== Early life and career ==
He attended Polytechnical Elementary and Junior High School in Pasadena, graduated from Coronado High School in 1929, and from the Pasadena Community Playhouse School of Theater in 1931.

In September 1936, Young was promoted from chief announcer to program director and production manager at Don Lee's KGB in San Diego, where he remained until March 1939, when he succeeded Z. Wayne Griffin as continuity editor for Lee's L.A. station, KHJ. In 1942, he was promoted to production manager for the entire Don Lee Network.

In 1947, Young replaced Mel Williamson as director on Family Theater. He continued in that capacity through May 1949, reappearing only sporadically and infrequently over the following five years.

Young's roles in other radio programs can be seen in the table below.

Program	Year	Role(s)	Notes
KGB Drama Guild	1935–1936, 1938	Producer, director, actor	
The Life of Edison	1935–1936	Actor: Thomas Edison	Produced by Art Linkletter, written by Sid Fuller
Sycamore Street	1937	Producer (as Dave Young)	
Air Adventure	1937	Producer (as Dave Young)	
Man of the House	1938	Producer	
Hollywood Laff'n Swing Club	1939	Producer	
Adventures Ahead	1939	Narrator (as Dave Young)	
Radio Charades	1941	MC	
Music Depreciation	1941-1945	Producer/Host	
We Pay You	1942–1943	MC	
This Is the Hour	1943	Producer	
The Dick Haymes Show	1945–1946	Producer/director	
Surprise Party	1946	Producer	
Family Theater	1947–1949, 1951, 1952	Director	
The Joyful Hour	December 21, 1947	Director	
The Triumphant Hour	March 28, 1948	Director	
Daily News Oratorical Contest Winners	March 18, 1949	Producer	"[S]pecial public service broadcast" aired by KFWB
Yours Truly, Johnny Dollar; Ep. "The Horace Lockhart Matter"	August 1, 1951	Director	
Escape; Ep. "The Vessel of Wrath"	May 10, 1953	Actor: The Head Boatsman	
Escape; Ep. "Clear for Action"	June 14, 1953	Actor: Unknown role	
Escape; Ep. "The Open Boat"	July 19, 1953	Actor: The Oiler	
Crime Classics; Ep. "The Final Day of General Ketchum, And How He Died"	July 27, 1953	Actor: Unknown role	
Suspense; Ep. "Needle in the Haystack"	November 9, 1953	Actor: Unknown role	
Suspense; Ep. "Lili and the Colonel"	May 17, 1955	Actor (as Dave Young): Unknown role	Original radio play by actor John Dehner

== Television ==
On New Year's Day, 1940, Young and fellow KHJ staffer Eddie Albright co-hosted and narrated what was reported to be the first-ever live telecast of the Tournament of Roses Pageant on W6XAO. On June 27, 1949, Young produced West View Review, a star-studded 90-minute fund-raiser—hosted by Garry Moore and featuring, among others, Ella Fitzgerald, Kay Kyser, Benny Carter and Dorothy Dandridge—airing on KTLA, in support of a proposed like-named interracial hospital, to be constructed at 5334 South Main Street in Los Angeles.

== Miscellany ==
On February 15, 1939, Young was the guest speaker at the San Diego branch of the League of American Pen Women. His talk stressed the importance of playwrights keeping their characters clearly delineated and of always reading aloud one's own work beforehand to ensure that no dialogue prove unduly difficult to voice.

== Honors ==
In June 1949, at the 20th annual commencement exercises of the Pasadena Playhouse School, Ernest A. Batchelder, chairman of the school's board of directors, presented Young with the Fannie E. Morrison Award "for having achieved special distinction in his career in the world of theater." It was also noted that "his achievement in radio has been through his own persistence and hard work."

== Personal life and death ==
Young was married twice: from February 27, 1936 until their divorce in October 1966, to fellow thespian—and occasional co-star—Vivian M. Merrill, and from 1968 until his death, to Dorothy M. Dodge. The first marriage produced a daughter, Janis, and son, David Ross Young.

On November 3, 1969, one day before his 58th birthday, Young died of undisclosed causes in San Diego, California. The following year, David Ross Young, then a graduate student at Scripps Institute of Oceanography, dedicated his dissertation to his father's memory.
