= They Say (jazz standard) =

Song
- Released: 1938
- Genre: jazz
- Songwriter: Edward Heyman
- Composers: Paul Mann; Stephan Weiss

"They Say" is a jazz standard and popular song written in 1938. It has music by Stephan Weiss and Paul Mann and with lyrics by Edward Heyman.

It was one of the highest-selling pieces of sheet music in January 1939. It peaked at #5 on Your Hit Parade.

It is ranked the 987th most recorded standard by JazzStandards.com.

== Noteworthy recordings ==
- Billie Holiday performed the vocals on the Benny Carter-arranged Teddy Wilson orchestra recording (1938)
- Helen Forrest (1938) performed the vocals on the Artie Shaw orchestra recording
- Mildred Bailey (1938)
- Tommy Ryan performed the vocals on the Sammy Kaye orchestra recording (1939)

== In film ==
"They Say" was used in the films Daughters Courageous (1939) and King of the Lumberjacks (1940).
