= When the Lights Go On Again =

"When The Lights Go on Again"

Song by Vaughn Monroe & His Orchestra
- Released: 1942
- Genre: Traditional pop
- Songwriters: Bennie Benjamin; Sol Marcus; Eddie Seiler

"When the Lights Go On Again (All Over the World)" is a popular song composed during World War II. It was written by Bennie Benjamin, Sol Marcus and Eddie Seiler. The first recording, by Vaughn Monroe, reached number one on the charts in 1943.

The song expresses the hopes for an end to the war. The title is from the refrain found throughout the song as is found in the first verse:

When the lights go on again all over the world
And the boys are home again all over the world
And rain or snow is all that may fall from the skies above
A kiss won't mean "Goodbye" but "Hello to love"

The reference to "lights going on again" alludes to the remark "The lamps are going out all over Europe. We shall not see them lit again in our life-time", attributed to British statesman Sir Edward Grey on the eve of the First World War. The title of the song may also refer to the longed-for end to the blackout restrictions imposed in London and elsewhere during the Second World War.

Lucky Millinder's version reached number twelve on the pop charts and reached number one on the R&B charts for two non consecutive weeks.

== Background ==
Music was a large part of culture during World War II. During the war, music served as a uniting factor among people around the world; “When the Lights Go On Again” was one of the songs that helped keep up the spirits of those who were struggling. Famous singer Vera Lynn was best known for her music during the war, including popular songs such as “Lili Marlene” and “Yours.” She “will always be remembered by all who endured the Hell of Hitler’s Blitz, she will always be remembered by the troops.”

Music has long been used to fight conflict and to help further the resolution of conflicts, as well as to fuel the fires of anger in some situations. In the case of “When the Lights Go On Again,” the song was written to give people a sense of hope and calm. Most agree that the lyrics were inspired heavily by the London blackout, which were imposed to combat the bombing raids by the Germans, called the Blitz, which lasted from September 1940 to May 1941. The blackouts lasted through to the end of the war.

It was a bleak time for Londoners and the rest of the British people, as it wasn’t only London that fell under attack during the Blitz. Any city in Britain could be bombed at any time, resulting in a general sense of fear throughout the nation. It was an incredibly anxious time, as Osbert Lancaster says in his book All Done from Memory: “During the “blitz” so long as I remained indoors I was ceaselessly assaulted by what psychiatrists so unfeelingly describe as “irrational fears,” but on escape into the wide open spaces they were promptly transformed by the patter of shrapnel into anxieties to which my reason accorded every justification.”

This war was called “The People’s War” for a reason – it was brought directly to the people of Britain, forcing them to flee the city or face a city of fear.

Because of all the anxiety and fear caused during this time, the people needed an outlet, and that outlet came often in the form of hopeful songs. “When the Lights Go On Again” speaks of what the world will be like after the war, something that would seem far away at the time to people who were undergoing the stresses of being under attack.

== Lyrics analysis ==
When the lights go on again all over the world
And the boys are home again all over the world
And rain or snow is all that may fall from the skies above
A kiss won't mean "goodbye" but "hello to love"

When the lights go on again all over the world
And the ships will sail again all over the world
Then we'll have time for things like wedding rings and free hearts will sing
When the lights go on again all over the world

Most people have interpreted these lyrics as being a reference to both the quote by Sir Edward Grey, as well as a reference to the blackout restrictions in England. The lyrics repeated the most are “When the lights go on again all over the world,” which united people from every corner of the earth during what was truly a global war. Within the repetition are hidden the lyrics “We’ll have time for things like wedding rings and free hearts will sing,” and “A kiss won’t mean goodbye but hello to love.” These were intended to paint a picture in the minds of listeners about how the world would begin again with the conclusion of the war.

== Musical ==
The musical When the Lights Go On Again gets its name from the song. Written by Roy Sault for modern performance, it tells the story of a family, the Parkers, living in England during World War II, and ends in a VE/VJ Day party. The music in the show consists of 28 well-loved songs from the 1940s, including “The White Cliffs of Dover,” “We’ll Meet Again,” “Don’t Sit Under the Apple Tree,” and “When the Lights Go On Again.”

== In popular culture ==
The Vera Lynn version appears in the 2023 film A Haunting in Venice'.

In the M*A*S*H episode, "The Light That Failed" (Season 6, Episode 6), Cpl. Klinger sings the first line of this song to himself ("When the lights go on again/all over the world").

== Recordings ==
The song has been recorded by several artists including:

- Gene Autry
- Joan Edwards
- Abbey Lincoln
- Vera Lynn
- Lucky Millinder
- Vaughn Monroe (later sampled and remixed by Boogie Belgique)
- Kay Starr
- Dick Todd

== Compilation albums ==
This song was included on the 2002 pro-America compilation album Flag Waver as part its collection of patriotic anthems, and was also included on the 2005 box set collection Songs That Won the War: Celebrating the 60th Anniversary of VE Day
