= Some Sunday Morning =

American songs

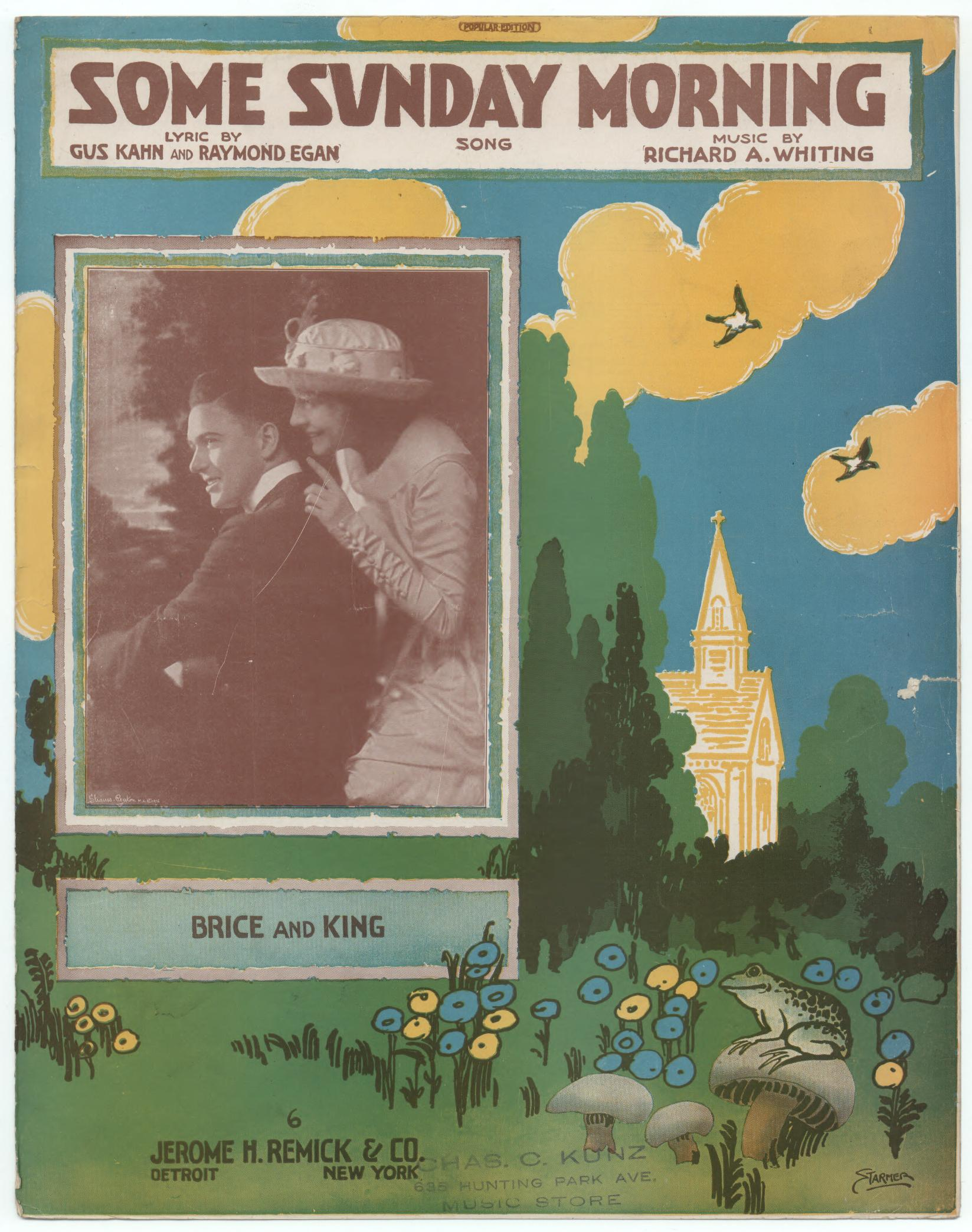
- Sheet music cover, 1917

Song
- Written: Richard Armstrong Whiting
- Published: 1917

"Some Sunday Morning" is the title of two well-known American songs. The first has music written by Richard A. Whiting with lyrics by Gus Kahn and Raymond B. Egan, and was recorded by Ada Jones and Billy Murray in 1917. The second has music by M.K. Jerome and Ray Heindorf, with lyrics by Ted Koehler, and was introduced in the 1945 film San Antonio by Alexis Smith.

The song was nominated for the Academy Award for Best Original Song in 1945 but lost out to “It Might as Well Be Spring”. It was also recorded that year by Helen Forrest and Dick Haymes, peaking at No. 9 on the Billboard chart.

== Legacy ==
The Jerome-Heindorf-Koehler tune was sung by Sylvester the Cat in the 1948 Merrie Melodies cartoon Back Alley Oproar, by Clint Walker and Joan Weldon in the 1957 Cheyenne episode "The Conspirators", and by Peggy King in the 1959 Maverick episode "The Strange Journey of Jenny Hill".
