= Everything for the Boys =

American radio dramatic anthology (1944–1945)

Everything for the Boys is an American dramatic anthology radio program that was broadcast on NBC January 18, 1944 - June 25, 1945, and was carried on 16 CBC Dominion stations in Canada. The same title was used for the program that succeeded it until it became The Dick Haymes Show.

== Overview ==
Ronald Colman starred in Everything for the Boys, in his first regular role on radio. Arch Oboler adapted plays for the broadcasts, with selection of plays based on servicemen's preferences indicated in a survey. Each episode included a guest star. Gordon Jenkins provided the music, and James Bannon was the announcer.

Episodes included two-way conversations between stars and servicemen via shortwave radio, with the first episode featuring two bomber pilots about to leave on their 50th mission from an airbase in England.

The trade publication Variety reported that Oboler's involvement with Everything for the Boys ended with completion of his work on the June 13, 1944, episode. An article in the magazine's June 7, 1944, issue said, "But as far as the Colman show's concerned, Oboler says he's fed up with adaptations and wants to dig his teeth into some original scripting." The same issue contained a report that Colman would leave the show after the June 13, 1944, episode "unless certain changes are made in the format". Colman later changed his mind and re-signed for another year on the program.

The program's 13-week summer replacement in 1944 retained the title Everything for the Boys but had a musical format. Jenkins continued to lead the orchestra with Dick Haymes as the star. Episodes featured female guest vocalists.

== Episodes ==
Partial List of Episodes of Everything for the Boys
Date	Episode	Guest Star(s)
January 18, 1944	"The Petrified Forest"	Ginger Rogers
February 8, 1944	"A Connecticut Yankee"	Bob Burns
April 25, 1944	"Death Takes a Holiday"	Ingrid Bergman
May 2, 1944	"Holy Matrimony"	Ruth Chatterton
May 16, 1944	"Blithe Spirit"	Loretta Young, Edna Best
May 30, 1944	"The House I Live in"	Dinah Shore
June 13, 1944	"Reunion in Vienna"	Claudette Colbert

== Production ==
Everything for the Boys was broadcast on Tuesdays from 7:30 to 8 p.m. Eastern Time, replacing Salute to Youth. It was broadcast live to most of the United States, with 22 stations in western states having transcribed re-broadcasts from 9 to 9:30 p.m. Pacific Time. Don Clark was the production supervisor for the Ruthrauff & Ryan agency. The sponsor was Autolite.

The nature of shortwave radio meant that connections for conversations between stars and soldiers were never certain. A staff member described the situation each week as "the tense moment when we wait for the engineer to tell us whether or not we will get through to Australia or Algiers or whatever point is being contacted". Each week's episode had three scripts on different colors of paper. The white one was used if the call had no problems. The green one was used when no connection was made. The red script came into use if contact was lost during the conversation.

== Critical response ==
A review of the premiere episode in The New York Times contained mixed feelings about the program's adaptation of The Petrified Forest. John K. Hutchens wrote that the broadcast illustrated a point that he had made in an earlier column regarding the difficulty of adapting plays for radio. Hutchens pointed out two constraints in that regard. One was the difficulty of condensing a two-hour stage production into 25 minutes of air time. The other was "radio taboos" that required milder language to be used in certain situations. The result of such adaptations, he concluded, "is neither radio nor theatre, but a shadow or a memory."

A review in The (Montreal) Gazette expressed disappointment in the two episodes that it covered. It cited the challenge of converting a book, play, or film into a production 20 minutes in length (to allow time for other elements of the program in the half hour). Herbert Whittaker wrote that on one broadcast the adaptation of a Jack London work "became rather ridiculous", while in the other episode the film Lost Horizon "lost all of its mystery and atmosphere in capsule form". He added that the conversations with servicemen lacked spontaneity, sounding as if the men were reading lines that had been given to them in advance.
