= Symphony (1945 song) =

1945 hit song

"Symphony" is a 1945 song written by Alex Alstone, André Tabet and Roger Bernstein. First brought to the United States by Johnny Desmond and the Glenn Miller Air Force Band, the song is also notable for having topped Billboard's sales, jukebox, radio, and Honor Roll of Hits charts in 1946, and having appeared on Billboard's first official year-end chart with 4 different versions.

== Background, composition and lyrical content ==
Billboard wrote in its November 24, 1945, issue that "Symphony" originated in the French Riviera as "C'est Fini" and went #1 across the entire country of France following the end of World War II. Time magazine further backs this claim in a 1945 article, stating that the "nostalgic ballad," was "lazily fingered from a crudely cleffed manuscript," by a pianist, who told the story to G.I.'s in the audience, about how the song's writer, a friend of his, was hunted down by the Gestapo for being Jewish.

The popularity of "C'est Fini" grew gradually, as it was requested to be heard "in every bar in Southern France." The song was re-written in English, and Chappell Music released the first copies of the song in Manhattan as "Symphony," testing it out for different vocalists and big band arrangements.

According to Time's translation of the original song's lyrics, they are about how the narrator is reminded of the voice of his significant other, (whom he has presumably not seen in some time) which he longs very much to hear once again, comparing it to that of a symphony. For the releases of the American versions, Jack Lawrence was ordered to write a more condensed, less emotional interpolation, in which the narrator describes the music he hears as his lover walks into a room and makes affection with him.

Time further compared the original "C'est Fini" to "Lili Marleen" and 1939's "I'll Never Smile Again". Melody Maker called the song "a delightful little French ballad," and an "imaginative and gripping piece of work," continuing, "'Symphony' may not be such an ingeniously constructed, advanced composition, but of all the charming little melodies, it is one of the most fascinating I have heard for many a long day—when properly treated," but ridiculed the renditions that had been most played at that point, claiming that they "missed something of this simple intimacy," and they are "not able to get into the coaxing and seductive atmosphere the song calls for."

"Symphony" was a vaudeville custom at the time of its popularity, and had been performed live at night clubs by dozens of different performers.

== Renditions ==
"Symphony"

Single by Freddy Martin and His Orchestra featuring Clyde Rogers
- B-side: "In the Middle of May"
- Released: October 1945
- Genre: Traditional pop; easy listening
- Length: 3:16
- Label: Victor

Freddy Martin singles chronology
"Lily Belle" (1945)	"Symphony" (1945)	"White Christmas" (1945)

=== Freddy Martin recording ===
The most popular of the five recordings to be released was by Freddy Martin in October 1945, who invited Clyde Rogers to perform vocal refrain. Martin's version of the song is played at 62 beats per minute, in the key of D major, switching to C major as soon as Rogers' vocals begin.

A Billboard writer wrote of the Martin & Rogers rendition, "While it doesn't hold the interest of a Tchaikovsky piece, the spinning is interesting enough to make it count. The Strad section, Steinway and saxes set forth the mood melody at a bright tempo, with Rogers registering for the lyrical story in song. For those hankering another creation in the Martin manner, 'Symphony' will make the phono grade in spite of its unfamiliar melody and uninviting title," going on to highlight the chosen B-side, "In the Middle of May," as a "breezy and toe-tapping rhythm ditty, with lyrics for the merry song carried by the harmonizing Martian Men quartet."

Martin himself eventually spoke of the track in an interview,

This was called "C'est Fini," the Parisian title was "C'est Fini," and they were going to use that title. Somebody said, "Well, it sounds like 'Symphony'". I don't know, I forget who the lyric writer was, but he re-wrote it and called it 'Symphony,' and it was a big hit.

— Freddy Martin, Pop Chronicles 1940s Program

Martin's recording proved to be the most successful in the United States, peaking at number 1 on the Best Sellers list, and spending thirteen weeks there in total. It also ranked as the 17th biggest song of 1946.

"Symphony"

Single by Benny Goodman featuring Liza Morrow
- B-side: "My Guy's Come Back"
- Released: November 1945
- Genre: Jazz
- Length: 3:04
- Label: Columbia

Benny Goodman singles chronology
"It's Only a Paper Moon" (1945)	"Symphony" (1945)	"Give Me the Simple Life" (1946)

=== Benny Goodman recording ===
Benny Goodman released his version in November 1945, with Liza Morrow's vocals accompanying him. In the key of F major, switching to G sharp / A flat major later in the song, Goodman and Morrow's "Symphony" has a tempo of 105 beats per minute.

A writer for Billboard praised Goodman's "thoroughly commercial treatment to the haunting melody," and "[application of] a righteous rhythmic base for his own exciting clarineting [that] makes the blues strain really rock in whimsical fashion", as well as Liza Morrow's "thrushing," "torch tonsiling," and "lyrical rhapsodizing," calling her overall "a real acquisition for this aggregation."

Goodman's version spent nine weeks in the top ten of the Best Sellers in Stores chart, peaking at number five, and ranking as the 27th biggest song of 1946.

"Symphony"

Single by Bing Crosby
- B-side: "Beautiful Love"
- Released: November 1945
- Genre: Easy listening; Traditional pop
- Length: 2:57
- Label: Decca

Bing Crosby singles chronology
"Aren't You Glad You're You?" (1945)	"Symphony" (1945)	"Give Me the Simple Life" (1946)

=== Bing Crosby recording ===
Bing Crosby's version was released in November 1945, and was directed by Victor Young. With a tempo of 91 beats per minute, the song is mostly in F sharp / G flat major.

Billboard complimented Crosby's "downright purring," and "dreamy and relaxed word slinging," and Young's "accenting [of] the soft strings and celeste tinkles in his accompanying orchestra," going on to call the song and its B-side a "lovely, nostalgic waltz melody".

Crosby's rendition peaked at number 3 on Billboard's Best Sellers in Stores chart, lasting a total of nine weeks there, and finishing 1946 as its 20th biggest song.

"Symphony"

Single by Jo Stafford featuring Paul Weston and His Orchestra
- A-side: "If My Heart Had a Window"
- Released: November 1945
- Genre: Jazz; Traditional pop
- Length: 2:26
- Label: Capitol

Jo Stafford singles chronology
"On the Sunny Side of the Street" (1945)	"Symphony" (1945)	"Day by Day" (1946)

=== Jo Stafford recording ===
Jo Stafford released her version in November 1945, with the assistance of Paul Weston. In the key of G major, the song has a tempo of 93 beats per minute.

Billboard reviewed Stafford's version twice, writing of the song in its December 15, 1945 issue, "For the first time this French tune is handled as it should have been from the start. This should kick [the song] right upstairs," and two weeks later, "With Paul Weston's band weaving a beautiful background pattern, Jo Stafford projects herself lyrically with rousing results for both of these loved ballads. Singing from way deep down gives a most sympathetic interpretation of 'Symphony,' as well as bringing out all the melodic and lyrical richness in the 'Day By Day' hit potential."

Stafford's version reached number 4 on the Best Sellers chart, and charted in the top ten for six weeks, closing out 1946 as its 32nd biggest song.

=== Natalino Otto recording ===
"Sinfonia d'amore/Sei tanto bella"

Single by Natalino Otto featuring Luciano Zuccheri and His Orchestra
- Released: March 1946
- Genre: Jazz
- Label: Fonit

Jo Stafford singles chronology
"Là in Argentina/A 15 anni" (1946)	"Sinfonia d'amore/Sei tanto bella" (1946)	"Sogno/Campane allegre" (1946)

Natalino Otto released her version in March 1946, with Italian lyrics written by lyricist Gino Adorni. The song was released as the A-side of a 78 rpm shellac record; the B-side is "Sei tanto bella." The arrangements for both songs are by maestro Luciano Zuccheri.

== Chart performance ==
In addition to having topped Billboard's Best Sellers in Stores, Most Played by Jockeys, and Most Played by Jukeboxes charts, "Symphony" topped the Honor Roll of Hits chart, and spent 19 weeks in its top 15. It also charted for 16 weeks in the England's Top Twenty chart, peaking at number five, and, according to Billboard, the song went #1 across the entire country of France.

== Notable versions ==
- Allan Jones
- Barry Wood
- Erroll Garner
- Jean Sablon & Paul Baron (reviewed by Billboard in their February 23, 1946 issue)
- Johnny Desmond and the Glenn Miller Air Force Band, who brought the song to the States
- Marlene Dietrich, who performed the original French version
- Sammy Turner, who brought the record to No. 82 in 1959
- Vera Lynn
