= Call Me Mister =

1946 Broadway revue

Call Me Mister is a 1946 revue with sketches by Arnold Auerbach and words and music by Harold Rome. The title refers to troops who are happily returning to civilian life and no longer want to be addressed by their military ranks.

The Broadway production, directed by Robert H. Gordon, opened on April 18, 1946 at the National Theatre. It transferred twice, to the Majestic and the Plymouth, before completing its run of 734 performances. The cast included Betty Garrett, George S. Irving, Maria Karnilova, Harry Clark, Jules Munshin, and Lawrence Winters. A cast recording was released by Decca Records.

In 1951, 20th Century Fox released a Lloyd Bacon-directed film version with a storyline corresponding with current events. Only three songs from the Broadway production were retained. Set in Japan during the period between World War II and the Korean War, it starred Betty Grable as American USO entertainer Kay Hudson, who crosses paths with former husband Shep Dooley (Dan Dailey), who is determined to win her back despite the presence of her current beau Capt. Johnny Comstock (Dale Robertson). In this musical, director Lloyd Bacon and dance director Busby Berkeley worked together the first and only time since 42nd Street (1933).

== Song list on original cast recording ==
- "Going Home Train"
- "Along With Me"
- "Little Surplus Me"
- "Red Ball Express"
- "Military Life"
- "Yuletide, Park Avenue"
- "When We Meet Again"
- "Face on the Dime"
- "South America, Take It Away"
- "Call Me Mister"
