= The Dick Haymes Show =

American old-time radio musical variety program

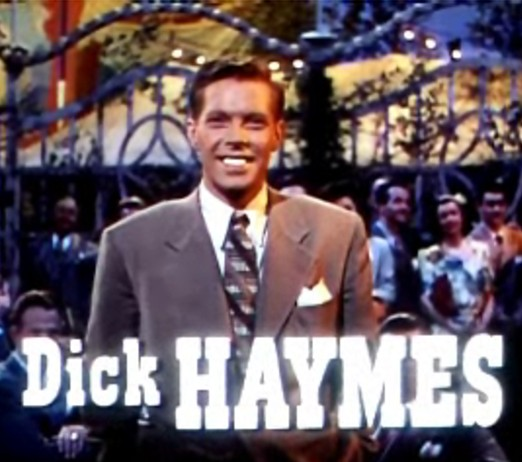
- Other names: Everything for the Boys
- Country of origin: United States
- Language(s): English
- Home station: KNX
- Syndicates: NBC; CBS; CBC
- Starring: Dick Haymes; Helen Forrest; Martha Tilton; Lina Romay; Cliff Arquette
- Produced by: Dave Young; Sam Pierce
- Original release: June 20, 1944 – July 1, 1948
- Sponsored by: Autolite

The Dick Haymes Show is an American old-time radio musical variety program. It was broadcast on NBC from June 20, 1944, to October 9, 1945, and on CBS from October 13, 1945, until July 1, 1948. It was also carried by the Canadian Broadcasting Corporation.

== Format and personnel ==
The Dick Haymes Show began under the title Everything for the Boys — a revision of a program that was a dramatic anthology series. Dick Haymes and Helen Forrest replaced Ronald Colman; music and comedy replaced plays. As time went on, the new format took on the name of the show's male star. In 1943, Haymes and Forrest had worked together on Here's to Romance on CBS radio. They left that program when the opportunity to work on this show became available.

In 1946, Forrest was replaced by Martha Tilton and Lina Romay. In 1947, Cliff Arquette joined the show in the role of "Mrs. Wilson, owner of a flower stand, who never knew the time of day."

Additional music was provided by the vocal group Six Hits and a Miss; Gordon Jenkins led the orchestra. Sam Pierce was the producer.

A review of the program's October 23, 1947, episode in the trade publication Billboard described a "good, if routine, offering, providing pleasant musical moments ..."

== Sponsor ==
The program was sponsored by Autolite.

== Other versions ==
In 1948, The Dick Haymes Show was one of several programs featured (in "capsule versions") on Here's To Veterans, a production of the United States Veterans Administration.

After the network version of The Dick Haymes Show ended, a separate program with the same title was syndicated by the World Broadcasting System.
