= Surrender (Perry Como song) =

1946 single by Perry Como

Single by Perry Como
- B-side: "They Say It's Wonderful"
- Recorded: April 2, 1946
- Studio: RCA Studio B
- Label: Victor
- Songwriters: Bennie Benjamin, George David Weiss

"Surrender" is a 1946 song co-written by Bennie Benjamin and George David Weiss. It was originally performed by Perry Como and covered by various artists including Woody Herman, George Olsen, and Bob Chester. Como's version of "Surrender" peaked at number one on the Billboard Best Selling Popular Retail Records chart and sold over a million copies.

== Background ==
The lyrics of "Surrender" are thought to be inspired by the surrender of Japan and Germany in World War II and the connections between surrendering in love and war.

== Perry Como version ==
On April 2, 1946, Perry Como recorded "Surrender" with Russ Case and his Orchestra. After the song was released in June 1946, Billboard called Como's version of "Surrender" a "slow dreamy arrangement" and praised the performance by Russ Cass's orchestra. Como's recording of "Surrender" went to sell over a million copies.

=== Chart performance ===
Como's version of "Surrender" peaked at #2 on the Most Played Juke Box Records chart on July 20, 1946. A few weeks later on August 3, 1946, "Surrender" peaked at #1 on the Billboard Best Selling Popular Retail Records and #2 on the Records Most Played on the Air chart. Outside of Billboard, Como's rendition of "Surrender" peaked at number 2 on Your Hit Parade.

== Woody Herman version ==
In June 1946, Woody Herman released a cover of "Surrender" with the Blue Flames. Billboard said Herman's rendition of "Surrender" with the Blue Flames had an enjoyable saxophone performance and did "full justice to the ballad plait".

=== Chart performance ===
From July to October 1946, Herman's version peaked at #8 on Billboard's Records Most Played on the Air and #12 on Most Played Jukebox Records charts.

== Other versions ==
Throughout 1946, multiple versions of "Surrender" were released. Billboard said that Phil Brito's cover was apt for his vocals while Tony Pastor's version was "pure corn".

== See also ==
- List of Billboard number-one singles of 1946
