= I'm a Big Girl Now (song) =

1946 song

"I'm a Big Girl Now" is a novelty song written by Al Hoffman, Milton Drake, and Jerry Livingston. It was recorded in 1946 by American bandleader Sammy Kaye with vocals by singer Betty Barclay. Released as a single by RCA Victor, Kaye's recording was a commercial success in the United States, topping The Billboard's Best-Selling Popular Retail Records chart in the issue dated April 27, 1946. It also peaked within the top ten of the magazine's Records Most-Played on the Air, Most-Played Juke Box Records, and Honor Roll of Hits charts.

According to Drake, "I'm a Big Girl Now" was written at the request of Kaye, who had recently recruited Barclay to sing with his band and sought a "special" song to debut at their first public performance together. Its lyrics are addressed to the singer's boyfriend, conveying to him her desire to no longer be treated as a child.

== See also ==
- List of Billboard number-one singles of 1946
