= Ronnie Deauville =

American swing singer (1925–1990)

- Born: August 28, 1925; Miami, Florida, U.S.
- Died: December 24, 1990 (aged 65) Vero Beach, Florida, U.S.
- Genres: Swing
- Occupation: singer
- Instrument: Vocals

Ronnie Deauville (August 28, 1925 in Miami, Florida – December 24, 1990 in Vero Beach, Florida) was a Sinatra-style singer who first became interested in singing while he was in naval air corps during the Second World War. His favorite band was Tommy Dorsey, and his singing style reflected admiration for its leading singer, Frank Sinatra.

After the war, a Paramount Pictures talent finder discovered Deauville when he saw him singing in a small theater play in Hollywood. That brought Deauville got his first contract, in the professional Glen Gray's Orchestra. In the following years, he worked with many great groups of that time, and as a solo artist he sang at shows such as Ted Mack Family TV and The Colgate Comedy Hour. He was also a guest artist in several top nightclubs, such as Mocambo in Los Angeles and El Mirador in Palm Springs.

== Life ==
Deauville's vocal career was not very long because in September 1956 he was in a car accident, then fell victim to polio and so was paralyzed from the neck down, only a few months before the Salk vaccine was invented. He spent more than a year on artificial lungs, having almost no chance to come back to singing because he had virtually no breath control. After months' hard work, Deauville returned to the local TV show in Los Angeles. A year after, his album Smoke Dreams reached No. 13 in the US. He continued to perform in public until he had to stop because of his health problems, and he was in a wheelchair in his last years.

== End of career ==
Deauville's career was suppressed, but Ralph Edwards soon worked out his story in his television show This Is Your Life. This show became so popular that Deauville was able to find work in the film dubbing industry for Twentieth Century-Fox, Warner Brothers and Allied Artists. He died of cancer on Christmas Eve of 1990.
