= Oh! What It Seemed to Be =

1946 popular song

Single by Frankie Carle and His Orchestra
- B-side: "As Long as I Live"
- Published: 1945
- Released: December 17, 1945
- Recorded: October 1945
- Genre: Traditional pop
- Length: 2:55
- Label: Columbia
- Composer: Frankie Carle
- Lyricists: Bennie Benjamin, George David Weiss

"Oh! What it Seemed to Be" is a song composed by Bennie Benjamin, George Weiss and Frankie Carle. The song was most popular in 1946, reaching number one that year by both Frank Sinatra and the Frankie Carle orchestra, the latter with Marjorie Hughes on vocals.

== Composition ==
The song was first published in 1945 by Abilene Music, Inc. and Anne-Rachel Music Corp. The song helped make Benjamin and Weiss the top songwriters of 1946. Carle said he adapted a tune he had for Benjamin and Weiss's lyrics. Largely on the strength of this composition, other Carle compositions received attention as well. Between Carle and Sinatra, the song spent 35% of the year 1946 at the top of the Billboard charts. It also spent nineteen weeks on Your Hit Parade, eight of them in the top position. As sheet music, the song was the fourth most popular of 1946. The song's subject matter deals with routine occurrences that become momentous when a significant other is involved.

== Frankie Carle version ==
Carle's version was the most popular, staying on the chart for twenty weeks, and topping the chart for eleven of those. It was the 22nd most popular recording of the pre-rock era. It introduced Marjorie Hughes as vocalist. Carle was reluctant to acknowledge that his vocalist was his daughter, fearing that charges of nepotism would hurt her career if she were not proven to be an effective vocalist in her own right. However, the outstanding success of this song soon caused an announcement that Carle and Hughes were indeed closely related.

== Frank Sinatra versions ==
Sinatra's first version of the song was with Axel Stordahl orchestration. Sinatra had told the arranger to not modify it from the version presented by the composers. Although initially more popular than Carle's own version, Sinatra's recording was ultimately only slightly less popular than Carle's; starting in February 1946 it had a chart run of seventeen weeks, eight of those at the number one position.

Sinatra re-recorded the song with Nelson Riddle orchestration for the 1963 album Sinatra's Sinatra. The version was less well received, as by this time Sinatra had long moved beyond any babe-in-the-woods persona.

Earlier, Sinatra had performed a version for the Old Gold radio show. A rehearsal take for that show in which Sinatra clowns around by voicing it in the manner of Mickey Katz has found popularity with collectors.

== Other recorded versions ==
Other popular 1946 versions were:

- A duet by Helen Forrest and Dick Haymes (charting at number 4), and Charlie Spivak (number 5).

Other recordings include:

- The George Paxton band released a version in 1946. For MGM, The DeMarco Sisters recorded it in 1954.
- The Castells had a minor hit (number 92) with the song in August 1962. Willie Nelson covered the song in 1994's album Healing Hands of Time.
- Jimmy Roselli recorded a charting version in late 1968, reaching No. 35 on the Billboard Easy Listening chart. It peaked at No. 34 on the Cashbox Looking Ahead chart, a forty song extension of the magazine's 100 Top Singles chart.
