= Marjorie Hughes =

American singer (1925–2025)

- Born: Marjorie Ledora Carlone; December 15, 1925; Springfield, Massachusetts, U.S.
- Died: October 5, 2025 (aged 99) Thousand Oaks, California, U.S.
- Genres: Big band, easy listening, pop standard
- Occupation: Singer
- Years active: 1946–1950

Marjorie Ledora Carle Wahl (née Carlone; December 15, 1925 – October 5, 2025), known professionally as Marjorie Hughes, was an American singer.

== Early life and career ==
Born on December 15, 1925, Hughes was the daughter of bandleader and pianist Frankie Carle, and began her career as a singer in her father's band. After singers Betty Bonney (aka Judy Johnson) and Phyllis Lynne had come and gone, Carle was auditioning new female singers; some in person, and some by means of demo records. Carle's wife sneaked in a demo of their daughter recorded from a radio program, where she was singing with the Paul Martin band in her first singing job. Carle liked the singer he heard on the demo, at first unaware that it was Hughes. When he decided to give his daughter a chance with his band, Carle changed her name to Marjorie Hughes, so that the public would not know she was his daughter, until he could be certain she would make the grade. The band had a no. 1 hit for six weeks with Hughes' vocals on "Oh, What It Seemed To Be", a song her father had co-written.

With the success of that song, Walter Winchell announced that Hughes was actually Carle's daughter. She appeared in Martin Block's Musical Merry-Go-Round No. 5: Frankie Carle and His Orchestra with Marjorie Hughes (Jack Scholl, 1948) (mislabeled #6 on the Warner Archive Collection 2010 DVD, Classic Musical Shorts from the Dream Factory), in which she was identified as Carle's daughter (her surname was used only on the opening card), and performs "Sweet and Lovely" an "Oh! What It Seemed to Be."

It was reported that Hughes stopped singing with the Carle orchestra in 1948 "because of illness." In 1949, she was the featured female singer on Your Hit Parade on Parade. By 1950, she was working in television and radio on the west coast.

== Personal life and death ==
Marjorie married Hughey Hughes, a pianist with Carle's orchestra in 1945; after four years of marriage, they divorced in 1949.

Hughes died in Thousand Oaks, California on October 5, 2025, at the age of 99.
