= Helen Forrest =

American pop singer (1917–1999)

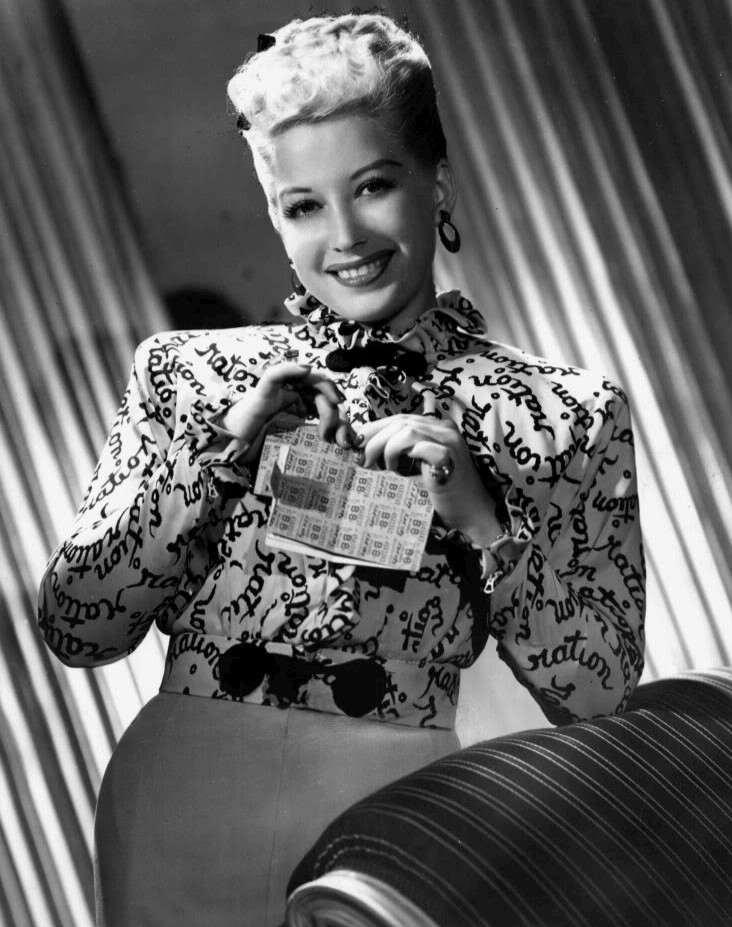
- Forrest in 1945

Background information
- Born: Helen Fogel; April 12, 1917; Atlantic City, New Jersey, U.S.
- Died: July 11, 1999 (aged 82) Los Angeles, California, U.S.
- Genres: Swing; traditional pop
- Occupation: Singer
- Instrument: Vocals
- Years active: 1934–1991

Helen Forrest (born Helen Fogel, April 12, 1917 – July 11, 1999) was an American singer of traditional pop and swing music. She served as the "girl singer" for three of the most popular big bands of the Swing Era (Artie Shaw, Benny Goodman, and Harry James), thereby earning a reputation as "the voice of the name bands."

== Childhood ==
Forrest was born in Atlantic City, New Jersey on April 12, 1917. Her parents, Louis and Rebecca Fogel, were Jewish. Her father died from influenza when Helen was an infant so she was raised by her mother, who often blamed her husband's death on Helen's birth. She believed God had taken her husband because she had wished so much for a baby girl. Helen had three older brothers: Harry, Ed, and Sam. In Helen's early teen years, the family relocated to Brooklyn. Her mother married a house painter, whom Helen disliked. Soon, Helen's mother and stepfather turned the family's home into a brothel. At 14, Helen was nearly raped by her stepfather; she defended herself with a kitchen knife, injuring him. Following this, Helen's mother permitted her to live with her piano teacher, Honey Silverman, and her family. While teaching her piano, Honey noticed Helen's singing ability and encouraged her to focus on singing instead. Anxious to find a career in singing, Helen dropped out of high school to pursue her dream.

== 1930s: Early career ==
Forrest returned to Atlantic City and began singing with her brother Ed's band. She soon returned to New York City, where she visited song publishers and performed an audition for a 15-minute slot for a local radio show. Around this time, Forrest was encouraged to change her name from "Fogel" because her name sounded "too Jewish." In 1934, 17-year-old Forrest began singing for WNEW in New York. She also performed for WCBS where she was known as “Bonnie Blue” and “The Blue Lady of Song.” Eventually she found a singing job at the Madrillon Club, in Washington, D.C., where she performed for approximately two years.

== 1938–1943: Shaw, Goodman, & James ==
After seeing Forrest at the Madrillon, bandleader Artie Shaw asked her to go on tour with him; Shaw was looking for new talent when vocalist Billie Holiday decided to leave the band. Helen was hired in 1938. For a time she and Holiday were both working with Shaw's band. In some venues, African-American performers were required to remain off stage until they performed. When Forrest became aware of this, she stated that like Holiday, she would also not take the stage until she was to sing. She recorded 38 singles with Shaw's band. Two of her biggest hits with Shaw were the songs "They Say" and "All the Things You Are." During her time with Shaw, Helen Forrest became a national favorite. In November 1939, Shaw broke up his band.

Helen joined Benny Goodman in December 1939, with whom she recorded a number of celebrated songs, including the hit song "The Man I Love." Helen recorded 55 studio recordings with Goodman. She told the Pop Chronicles radio series: "Benny would look right above your eyebrows, in the middle, right on top of the brow. He was a very strange man," and described Goodman as the most demanding band leader she sang for. Forrest also stated, "The band I joined was sensational, but few special arrangements were written for me. I sang choruses, and made myself fit to the music. Benny used to drive me crazy by 'noodling' behind me on clarinet while I sang." Goodman was also reported to have been a perfectionist and a very difficult man to work with. In August 1941, Forrest quit the orchestra "to avoid having a nervous breakdown." After leaving Goodman, Forrest briefly recorded with Nat King Cole and Lionel Hampton.

In 1941, she approached Harry James, offering to work for him under one condition: that she be permitted to sing more than one chorus. Although James was looking for a more jazz-oriented singer, he allowed Forrest to audition. The band voted her in and she was hired. Several decades later, Forrest explained in an interview, "Harry James was wonderful. When I joined him, I said, 'There's only one condition: I don't care how much you pay me, I don't care about arrangements. The one thing I want is to start a chorus and finish it. I want to do verses, so don't put me up for a chorus in the middle of an instrumental.' He said, 'You got it,' and that was it." She also told writer George T. Simon, "I'll always remain grateful to Artie and Benny. But they had been featuring me more like they did a member of the band, almost like another instrumental soloist. Harry, though, gave me just the right sort of arrangement and setting that fit a singer. It wasn't just a matter of my getting up, singing a chorus, and sitting down again." In his book, The Big Bands, Simon explained that Harry James constructed "the arrangements around his horn and Helen's voice, establishing warmer moods by slowing down the tempo so that two, instead of the usual three or more choruses, would fill a record ...many an arrangement would build to a closing climax during Helen's vocal, so that she would emerge as its star." It was with the Harry James Orchestra that Helen recorded what are arguably her most popular numbers, including "I Had the Craziest Dream,” “I’ve Heard That Song Before,” and “I Don't Want to Walk Without You" in 1942. (“I Don’t Want to Walk Withou You” had previously charted in 1941.) In 1942, Helen also appeared with the Harry James Band in the Hollywood film Springtime in the Rockies, starring Betty Grable.

In 1942 and 1943, Helen Forrest was voted the best female vocalist in the United States in the Down Beat poll.

== 1944–1960s: Solo career ==
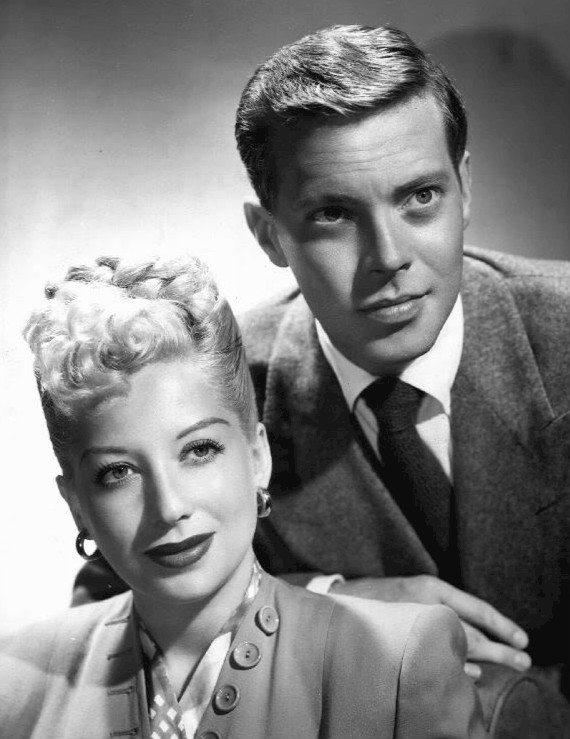
Publicity photo of Forrest and Haymes at the start of Haymes' radio show in 1944.

Forrest left Harry James in late 1943 in pursuit of a solo career, saying "three years with a band is enough." She signed a recording contract with Decca and co-starred with Dick Haymes on The Dick Haymes Show on CBS radio from 1944 to 1947. Helen's first Decca disc, "Time Waits For No One", reached second place on the Hit Parade, and the radio show achieved top ratings. Haymes was also contracted to Decca, and from 1944 to 1946 the pair recorded 18 duets, 10 of them reaching the Top Ten. Particularly successful were their versions of "Long Ago and Far Away", "It Had To Be You", "Together", "I'll Buy That Dream", "I'm Always Chasing Rainbows" and "Oh, What It Seemed To Be". In 1944, she made an appearance in the Esther Williams movie Bathing Beauty with Harry James and his orchestra. She also appeared in the film Two Girls and a Sailor. During the last years of the 1940s, Helen headlined at theatres and clubs.

In 1955, Helen's mother died. In that same year, Helen joined Harry James again in the studio to record a new swing album called, Harry James in Hi-Fi, which became a bestseller. By the end of the 1950s, Helen's solo career waned as rock'n'roll became increasingly popular. Helen's manager, Joe Graydon, said, "She was at an 'in-between' stage in her career. Not young enough to be current. Not old enough to be nostalgia."

After a dip in recording in the 1950s, including a stint with the startup Bell Records, Helen sang with Tommy Dorsey's orchestra, led by Sam Donahue, in the early 1960s. Helen continued to make occasional records and perform in concerts and was performing at Lake Tahoe with Frank Sinatra Jr. in 1963 when he was kidnapped.

== 1970s–1990s: Later years and retirement ==
During the 1970s and 1980s, Forrest performed in supper clubs on "big band nostalgia" tours, including appearances with Harry James and Dick Haymes. In 1977, Helen participated in a television reunion of herself, James, and Haymes on The Merv Griffin Show. This led to a touring production called The Fabulous 40s (1978), followed in 1979 with a similar revue entitled The Big Broadcast of 1944. In 1980, six months following Haymes' death, Helen suffered a stroke, but recovered to resume performing and recording. Her autobiography, I Had the Craziest Dream, was published in 1982 and is dedicated to her only son. In 1983, Helen released her final album, entitled Now and Forever. She also starred with Vivian Blaine and Margaret Whiting in a stage revue titled A Tribute to Dick Haymes.

Despite an unhappy childhood, frequent illness, and personal disappointments, Forrest remained dedicated to her musical profession and continued singing until the early 1990s when rheumatoid arthritis began to affect her vocal cords and forced her into retirement. Forrest also suffered scarlet fever as a youngster, which left her with a hearing loss. The loss of her hearing worsened as she became older and she was able to perform her old standards because she remembered where the notes for them were.

== Death ==
Helen Forrest died on July 11, 1999, from congestive heart failure at the Motion Picture & Television Country House and Hospital in Woodland Hills, Los Angeles. She was 82.

She was laid to rest at Mount Sinai Memorial Park Cemetery, in the Hollywood Hills, Los Angeles, with a temporary marker. Online funding provided her with a grave stone.

== Relationships ==
Forrest married and divorced three times. In 1960, she (with her third husband, Charles Feinman) gave birth to her only son, Michael Forrest Feinman. Michael resided in southern California until his death on May 1, 2014.

In the early 1940s, Forrest had a love affair with bandleader Harry James while she was part of his band. The relationship ended shortly before James met the woman he would later marry, actress Betty Grable. Forrest wrote, "I've had three marriages and I never married Harry, but he was the love of my life. Let's face it, I still carry a torch for the so-and-so."

== Quote ==
Helen Forrest on her career:

"I live for today, but it is nice sometimes to look back to yesterday. We did not know that we were living through an era - the Big Band Era - that would last only 10 years or so and be remembered and revered for ever...it's hard to believe, but the best times were packed into a five-year period from the late 1930s through the early 1940s when I sang with the bands of Artie Shaw, Benny Goodman, and Harry James. The most dramatic moments of my life were crammed into a couple of years from the fall of 1941 to the end of 1943. They seem to symbolize my life...that was when the music of the dance bands was the most popular music in the country, and I was the most popular female band singer in the country and Harry had the most popular band in the country. It didn't last long, but it sure was something while it lasted. Everyone should have something like it at least once in their lives. I'm grateful I did." - Helen Forrest (circa 1982)

== Legacy ==
At the peak of her career, Helen Forrest was the most popular female singer in the United States. Because of her work with the bands of Artie Shaw, Benny Goodman, and Harry James, she is known as "the voice of the name bands" and is regarded by some as the best female vocalist of the swing era. In addition, AllMusic describes Forrest as "a performer that some might not consider a jazz vocalist, but one with exceptional ability to project lyrics and also an excellent interpreter." Also, IMDb describes Forrest: "though Helen was not, perhaps, a jazz singer in the truest sense, she brought to her songs a wistful 'girl-next-door' quality" through her "femininity and warmth of her voice and the clear, emotional phrasing of her lyrics." In his book The Big Bands, writer George Simon wrote, "Helen was a wonderfully warm and natural singer."

Over the course of her career, Helen Forrest recorded more than 500 songs. In 2001, she was posthumously inducted into the now-defunct Big Band and Jazz Hall of Fame.

== Discography ==
=== Original albums ===
- Voice of the Name Bands (Capitol Records, 1956), orchestra leaders: Dave Cavanaugh and Billy May

Black Majic with Buddy Defranco 1957.

=== Reissues ===
- Artie Shaw, The Uncollected Vol. 4, 1939 (Hindsight Records, 1980), recorded, 1939
- The Complete Helen Forrest with the Benny Goodman Orchestra (Collector's Choice Music, 2001), recorded, 1940–1941
- The Complete Helen Forrest with the Harry James Orchestra (Collector's Choice Music, 1999), recorded, ca. 1941–1943, 1946
- Complete World Transcriptions (Soundies, 1999), recorded, 1949–1950

=== Charted singles ===
Year	Single	US Chart
1938	"I Have Eyes" (with Artie Shaw)	10
1938	"Deep in a Dream" (with Artie Shaw)	3
1938	"They Say" (with Artie Shaw)	1
1939	"Thanks for Ev'rything" (with Artie Shaw)	1
1939	"Between a Kiss and a Sigh" (with Artie Shaw)	13
1939	"Deep Purple" (with Artie Shaw)	17
1939	"You Grow Sweeter As the Years Go By" (with Artie Shaw)	15
1939	"I Poured My Heart into a Song" (with Artie Shaw)	4
1939	"Comes Love" (with Artie Shaw)	4
1939	"Melancholy Mood" (with Artie Shaw)	8
1939	"Day In, Day Out" (with Artie Shaw)	11
1939	"Many Dreams Ago" (with Artie Shaw)	11
1939	"All the Things You Are" (with Artie Shaw)	8
1940	"What's the Matter with Me?" (with Benny Goodman)	19
1940	"How High the Moon" (with Benny Goodman)	6
1940	"The Fable of the Rose" (with Benny Goodman)	20
1940	"I Can't Love You Any More (Any More Than I Do)" (with Benny Goodman)	5
1940	"I Can't Resist You" (with Benny Goodman)	13
1940	"Dreaming Out Loud" (with Benny Goodman)	24
1941	"Perfidia (Tonight)" (with Benny Goodman)	11
1941	"My Sister and I" (with Benny Goodman)	20
1941	"These Things You Left Me" (with Benny Goodman)	25
1941	"Yours" (with Benny Goodman)	17
1942	"The Devil Sat Down and Cried" (with Harry James)	23
1942	"I Don't Want to Walk Without You" (with Harry James)	1
1942	"Skylark" (with Harry James)	11
1942	"I Remember You" (with Harry James)	24
1942	"But Not for Me" (with Harry James)	12
1942	"He's My Guy" (with Harry James)	7
1942	"I Cried for You" (with Harry James)	19
1942	"Mister Five by Five" (with Harry James)	1
1942	"I Had the Craziest Dream" (with Harry James)	1
1942	"Manhattan Serenade" (with Harry James)	9
1943	"I've Heard That Song Before" (with Harry James)	1
1943	"Taking a Chance on Love" (with Benny Goodman)	1
1943	"Cabin in the Sky" (with Benny Goodman)	19
1943	"I Heard You Cried Last Night" (with Harry James)	2
1944	"Time Waits for No One" (solo as Helen Forrest)	2
1944	"Long Ago (and Far Away)" (with Dick Haymes)	2
1944	"It Had to Be You" (with Dick Haymes)	4
1944	"Together" (with Dick Haymes)	3
1945	"I'll Buy That Dream" (with Dick Haymes)	2
1945	"Some Sunday Morning" (with Dick Haymes)	9
1946	"I'm Always Chasing Rainbows" (with Dick Haymes)	7
1946	"Oh! What It Seemed to Be" (with Dick Haymes)	4
1946	"Come Rain or Come Shine" (with Dick Haymes)	23
1946	"In Love in Vain" (with Dick Haymes)	12
1946	"Why Does It Get So Late So Early" (with Dick Haymes)	22
