= Dick Haymes =

Argentine singer, songwriter and actor (1918–1980)

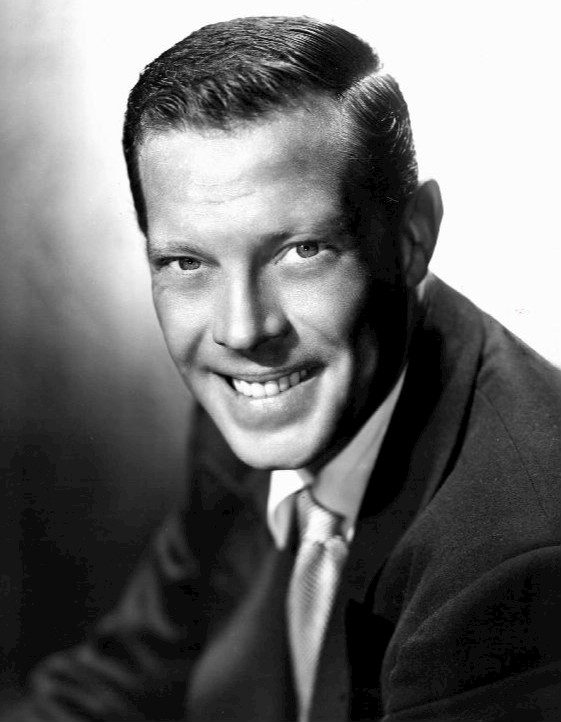
- Haymes in the 1940s
- Born: Richard Benjamin Haymes; September 13, 1918; Buenos Aires, Argentina
- Died: March 28, 1980 (aged 61); Los Angeles, California, U.S.
- Occupations: Singer; songwriter; actor
- Years active: 1935–1978
- Spouses: Edith Harper (m. 1939; ann. 1939) Joanne Dru (m. 1941; div. 1949) Nora Eddington (m. 1949; div. 1953) Rita Hayworth (m. 1953; div. 1955) Fran Jeffries (m. 1958; div. 1965) Wendy Smith (m. 1966)
- Children: 6

Richard Benjamin Haymes (September 13, 1918 – March 28, 1980) was an Argentine singer, songwriter and actor. He was one of the most popular male vocalists of the 1940s and early 1950s. He was the older brother of Bob Haymes, an actor, television host, and songwriter.

== Early life ==
Haymes was born in Buenos Aires, Argentina, in 1918. His father was a rancher of English descent and his Irish mother had been a musical comedy singer. His parents traveled widely and he grew up in France, Montreal, California and Switzerland.

== Career ==
At the age of 17, Haymes moved to Los Angeles, where he initially worked as a stunt man and film double. Two years later, in 1937, he moved to New York City, where he worked as a vocalist in a number of big bands. By the early 1940s, Haymes was singing with the Harry James orchestra. On September 3, 1942, Frank Sinatra introduced Haymes on radio as his replacement in the Tommy Dorsey band.

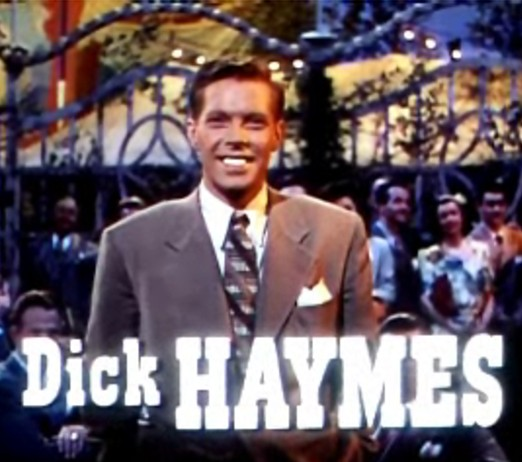
Dick Haymes in State Fair (1945)

In 1945, Haymes co-starred with Jeanne Crain, Dana Andrews and Vivian Blaine in the musical State Fair. He teamed with female vocalist Helen Forrest for many hit duets during World War II, including "Together", "I'll Buy That Dream", and "Long Ago and Far Away"; he sang with Judy Garland on two Decca recordings of songs from the film The Shocking Miss Pilgrim, in which he appeared with Betty Grable. From 1944 to 1948, he had his own radio program, The Dick Haymes Show, first on NBC and later on CBS.

He frequently paired with the Andrews Sisters over a dozen Decca collaborations, including the Billboard hit "Teresa", "Great Day", "My Sin", and a 1952 rendering of the dramatic ballad "Here in My Heart", backed by the sisters and Nelson Riddle's lush strings. His duets with Patty Andrews were also well received, both on Decca vinyl and on radio's Club Fifteen with the sisters, which he hosted in 1949 and 1950. He also joined Bing Crosby and The Andrews Sisters for 1947 session that produced the Billboard hit "There's No Business Like Show Business", as well as "Anything You Can Do (I Can Do Better)". His popular renditions of tender ballads such as "Little White Lies" and "Maybe It's Because" were recorded with celebrated arranger Gordon Jenkins and his orchestra and chorus.

== World War II and attempted deportation ==
Haymes's birth in Argentina to non-U.S. citizens meant he was not an American citizen. In order to avoid military service during World War II, Haymes asserted his nonbelligerent status as a citizen of Argentina, which remained neutral until almost the end of the war. Hollywood-based columnists Louella Parsons and Hedda Hopper questioned Haymes' patriotism, but the story had little effect on his career. About that time, he was classified 4-F by the draft board because of hypertension. As part of his draft examination, he was confined for a short period to a hospital on Ellis Island, which confirmed his diagnosis of hypertension.

Throughout World War II, Haymes regularly appeared in benefit shows. Haymes toured US bases entertaining the troops, often with his radio partner, singer Helen Forrest; such was the popularity of The Dick Haymes Radio Show. He was also a regular contributor over many years to such shows as Guest Star, The Navy Show and Here’s To Vets.

In 1953 Haymes went to Hawaii (then still a territory of the United States) to visit actress Rita Hayworth, whom he later married. On returning to the U.S. mainland in August he was arrested for deportation under the McCarran–Walter Act for refusing to enter U.S. military service, and therefore was not entitled to live in the country. He appealed, and in 1955 won his battle to remain on the basis that Hawaii was a geographical part of the United States, and thus he had never left it.

== Personal life ==
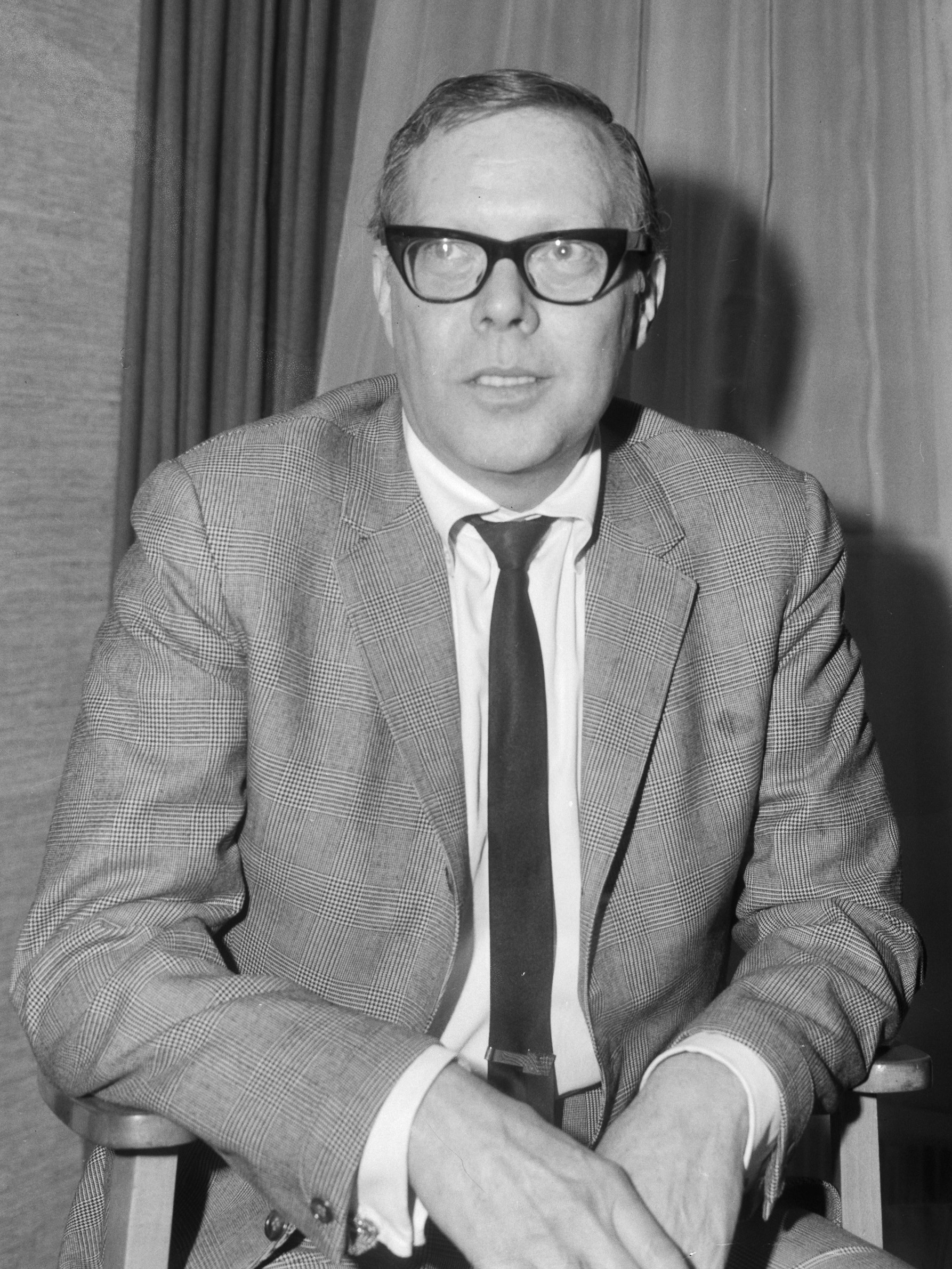
Dick Haymes in 1966

Haymes experienced alcoholism and had serious financial problems later in life. By the early 1960s, he declared bankruptcy with $500,000 worth of debt.

Through his mother's Irish nationality, Haymes became an Irish citizen in December 1965. He lived in Dublin until 1966, before moving to England where he resided until May 1971.

=== Marriages ===
Haymes was married six times. His first marriage to Edith Harper (1939) occurred when she claimed to be pregnant, but was annulled after it was discovered that she was not. Haymes's other wives were film actresses Joanne Dru (1941–1949), Nora Eddington (1949–1953), Rita Hayworth (1953–1955), Fran Jeffries (1958–1964), and British model Wendy Smith (1966). Haymes had six children—three with Dru, one with Jeffries, and two with Smith.

== Death ==
Haymes died from lung cancer on March 28, 1980, at Cedars-Sinai Medical Center in Los Angeles. He was 61 years old.

== Discography ==
=== 78-rpm albums ===
- Selections from Rogers and Hammerstein's "State Fair" (1946, Decca Records)
- Dick Haymes Sings – Carmen Cavallaro at the Piano – Irving Berlin Songs (1948, Decca Records)

Original Albums

- Rain or Shine, Capitol Records,1955
- Moondreams, Capitol Records,1956
- The Name’s Haymes, Hallmark Records,1958
- Oh! Look At Me Now, Hollywood Records,1958
- Richard the Lion-Hearted, Dick Haymes That Is, Warwick Records,1960
- Then & Now, Mercury Records (UK),1969
- For You, For Me, Forevermore, Audiophile Records,1976
- As Time Goes By, Ballad Records,1978
- Keep It Simple, Audiophile Records,1987

=== LP compilations ===
- Dick Haymes, Love Letters, Vocalion, VL 3616, (1958)
- Dick Haymes, Little White Lies, Decca, DL 8773, (1958)
- Dick Haymes, The Best Of, MCA Records, MCFM 2720 (1975) UK
- Dick Haymes, The Best Of, MCA Records, MCA2-4097, (1975)
- Dick Haymes, Imagination, Audiophile Records, AP-79, (1982)
- Dick Haymes, Sings Irving Berlin, MCA Records, MCL 1773, (1983) UK

=== Live LP albums ===
- Dick Haymes Comes Home! (1973)

=== Selected CD compilations ===
- Ballad CDs (The Dick Haymes Society) Producer: Roger L. Dooner
- Dick Haymes On The Air, Live Broadcast Performances (1942-1944) DHS CD 1 (1996)
- Dick Haymes On The Air, Live Broadcast Performances (1944-1948) DHS CD 2 (1996)
- Dick Haymes On NBC Bandstand (1956-1957) DHS CD 3 (1997)
- Dick Haymes On Air, (1950-1962) DHS CD 4
- Dick Haymes On The Air, (1945-1947) DHS CD 5
- The Dick Haymes Show, (1947-1948) DHS CD 6
- Dick Haymes, Christmas Wishes, DHS CD 7
- Dick Haymes, Club 15, (1949-1950) DHS CD 8
- Young Dick Haymes with Harry James And His Orchestra (1940-1941) DHS-CD-9 (2005)

Memoir Records

- Dick Haymes, Harry James, Helen Forrest. How High The Moon. Memoir, CD MOIR510 (1995)
- Dick Haymes, It Had To Be You, Memoir, CD MOIR 512 (1995)
- Dick Haymes, My Heart Tells Me, Memoir, CD MOIR 521 (1997)
- Dick Haymes, Stella By Starlight, Memoir, CD MOIR547 (2000)

Audiophile Records

- For You, For Me, Forevermore. Audiophile Records, ACD-130 (1994)
- Keep It Simple, AudioRecords, ACD-200 (1995)

Circle Records

- Harry James And His Orchestra, Dick Haymes, Vocals-1941 Circle CCD-5

Savoy Jazz

- Harry James, First-Team Player On The Jazz Varsity with vocals by Dick Haymes, Savoy Jazz ZDS 4406

Jasmine Records

- The Golden Years Of Dick Haymes. Let The Rest Of The World Go By. JASBOX 9-4 MONO (2003)

EMI gold

- Dick Haymes. The Complete Capitol Collection. 0946 3 71389 2 2 (2006)

Acrobat Music

- I Like The Likes Of You. Broadcast Recordings 1947-1962. ADDCD3471 (2023)

Music Club

- Dick Haymes & Helen Forrest. The Complete Duets. MCCD 208 (1995)

Collectors’ Choice Music

- Dick Haymes with Harry James and Benny Goodman. The Complete Columbia Recordings. A2 28897 CCM-047-2 (1998)

== Filmography ==
- Mutiny on the Bounty (1935) – Able-Bodied Seaman (uncredited)
- Dramatic School (1938) – Student (uncredited)
- Du Barry Was a Lady (1943) – Singer (uncredited)
- Girl Crazy (1943) – Member, The Pied Pipers (uncredited)
- Four Jills in a Jeep (1944) – Lt. Dick Ryan
- Irish Eyes Are Smiling (1944) – Ernest R. Ball
- I Am an American (Short film, 1944) – Himself (uncredited)
- Diamond Horseshoe (1945) – Joe Davis Jr.
- State Fair (1945) – Wayne Frake
- Fallen Angel (1945) – Himself – JukeBox Vocalist (voice, uncredited)
- Do You Love Me (1946) – Jimmy Hale
- The Shocking Miss Pilgrim (1947) – John Pritchard
- Carnival in Costa Rica (1947) – Jeff Stephens
- Up in Central Park (1948) – John Matthews
- One Touch of Venus (1948) – Joe Grant
- Words and Music (1948) – Himself
- St. Benny the Dip (1951) – Benny
- Screen Snapshots – Hollywood Fun Festival (1952) – Master of Ceremonies
- All Ashore (1953) – Joe Carter
- Let's Do It Again (1953) – Singer – 'I Could Never Love Anyone But You' (voice, uncredited)
- Cruisin' Down the River (1953) – Beauregard Clemment / Beau Clemment III
- Adam-12 (1974) (TV) – Dr. Elroy Gantman
- Hec Ramsey (1974) (TV – S2E04 – Scar Tissue) – Hamilton Hobbs
- Betrayal (1974) (ABC Movie of the Week) – Harold Porter
- Won Ton Ton, the Dog Who Saved Hollywood (1976) – James Crawford
- The Eddie Capra Mysteries (1978) (TV – episode "Murder on the Flip Side") – Jason Lamb

–

== Hit records ==
Year	Single	Chart positions	
Year	Single	^{U.S.}	^{U.S. R&B}
1941	"A Sinner Kissed an Angel" (with Harry James)	15	
1942	"The Devil Sat Down and Cried" (with Harry James & Helen Forrest)	15	
1942	"Idaho" (with Benny Goodman)	4	
1942	"Take Me" (with Benny Goodman)	10	
1942	"Serenade in Blue" (with Benny Goodman)	17	
1943	"It Can't Be Wrong"	1	2
1943	"In My Arms"	3	
1943	"You'll Never Know"	1	1
1943	"Wait for Me, Mary"	6	
1943	"I Never Mention Your Name"	11	
1943	"I Heard You Cried Last Night"	13	8
1943	"Put Your Arms Around Me, Honey"	5	
1943	"For the First Time"	13	
1944	"I'll Get By (As Long as I Have You)" (with Harry James)	1	
1944	"Long Ago (and Far Away)" (with Helen Forrest)	2	
1944	"How Many Times Do I Have to Tell You"	27	
1944	"How Blue the Night"	11	
1944	"It Had to Be You" (with Helen Forrest)	4	
1944	"Together" (with Helen Forrest)	3	
1944	"Janie"	26	
1945	"Laura"	9	
1945	"The More I See You"	7	
1945	"I Wish I Knew"	6	
1945	"Till the End of Time"	3	
1945	"Love Letters"	11	
1945	"I'll Buy That Dream" (with Helen Forrest)	2	
1945	"Some Sunday Morning" (with Helen Forrest)	9	
1945	"That's for Me"	6	
1945	"It Might as Well Be Spring"	5	
1946	"I'm Always Chasing Rainbows" (with Helen Forrest)	7	
1946	"It's a Grand Night for Singing"	21	
1946	"Oh! What It Seemed to Be" (with Helen Forrest)	4	
1946	"Slowly"	12	
1946	"Come Rain or Come Shine" (with Helen Forrest)	23	
1946	"In Love in Vain" (with Helen Forrest)	12	
1946	"You Make Me Feel So Young"	21	
1946	"Why Does It Get So Late So Early?" (with Helen Forrest)	22	
1946	"On the Boardwalk"	21	
1947	"For You, for Me, for Evermore" (with Judy Garland)	19	
1947	"How Are Things in Glocca Morra?"	9	
1947	"Mam'selle"	3	
1947	"There's No Business Like Show Business" (with Bing Crosby & The Andrews Sisters)	25	
1947	"Ivy"	19	
1947	"Naughty Angeline"	21	
1947	"I Wish I Didn't Love You So"	9	
1947	"And Mimi"	15	
1948	"Teresa" (with The Andrews Sisters)	21	
1948	"Little White Lies" (gold record)	2	
1948	"You Can't Be True, Dear"	9	
1948	"Nature Boy"	11	
1948	"It's Magic"	9	
1948	"Ev'ry Day I Love You"	24	
1949	"Bouquet of Roses"	22	
1949	"Room Full of Roses"	6	
1949	"Maybe It's Because"	5	
1949	"The Old Master Painter"	4	
1950	"Roses"	29	
1950	"Count Every Star" (with Artie Shaw)	10	
1950	"Can Anyone Explain? (No! No! No!)"	23	
1951	"You're Just in Love" (with Ethel Merman)	30	
1951	"And So to Sleep Again"	28	
1956	"Two Different Worlds"	80	

== Musical theatre ==
- Miss Liberty (1951, Dallas Theatre)

The Big Broadcast of 1944, - A Lee Gruber, Shelly Gross off Broadway production, fall of 1979 – Devon, PA, Detroit, MI, and Westbury, NY

== Radio appearances ==
Year	Program	Episode/source
1944-48	The Dick Haymes Show	
1948	Lux Radio Theatre	Irish Eyes Are Smiling
1948	Screen Guild Players	Up in Central Park
1953	Suspense	Pigeon in the Cage

== See also ==
- Al Lerner (composer)
