= Rumors Are Flying =

1946 popular song

Song
- Published: 1946
- Genre: Traditional pop
- Songwriters: Bennie Benjamin; George David Weiss

"Rumors Are Flying" is a 1946 popular song popularized by Frankie Carle and The Andrews Sisters with Les Paul.

== Background ==
The song was written by Bennie Benjamin and George David Weiss and published in 1946.

It was popularized in 1946 by Frankie Carle (vocal by Marjorie Hughes) and by The Andrews Sisters with Les Paul. In 1946, the Frankie Carle version was an American number-one hit for nine weeks from late October that year.

== Other recordings ==
Other charted versions in 1946 were by Betty Jane Rhodes, Billy Butterfield, The Three Suns, Tony Martin, and by Harry Cool and his Orchestra (vocal by Mindy Carson) (who recorded the song for Signature Records, catalog #15043).

== Sources ==
- Nimmo, H. Arlo. The Andrews Sisters. Jefferson: McFarland & Co, Inc., 2004.
- Sforza, John. Swing It! The Andrews Sisters Story. Lexington: The University Press of Kentucky, 2000.
- Shaughnessy, Mary Alice. Les Paul: An American Original. New York: W. Morrow, 1993.
