= Frankie Carle =

American pianist and bandleader (1903–2001)

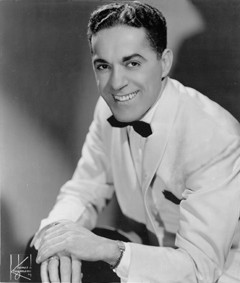
- Carle circa 1943

Background information
- Also known as: Frankie Carle, The Wizard of the Keyboard
- Born: Francesco Nunzio Carlone; March 25, 1903; Providence, Rhode Island, United States
- Died: March 7, 2001 (aged 97) Mesa, Arizona, United States
- Genres: Big band, easy listening, pop standard, piano
- Occupations: Musician, songwriter
- Years active: 1916–1989

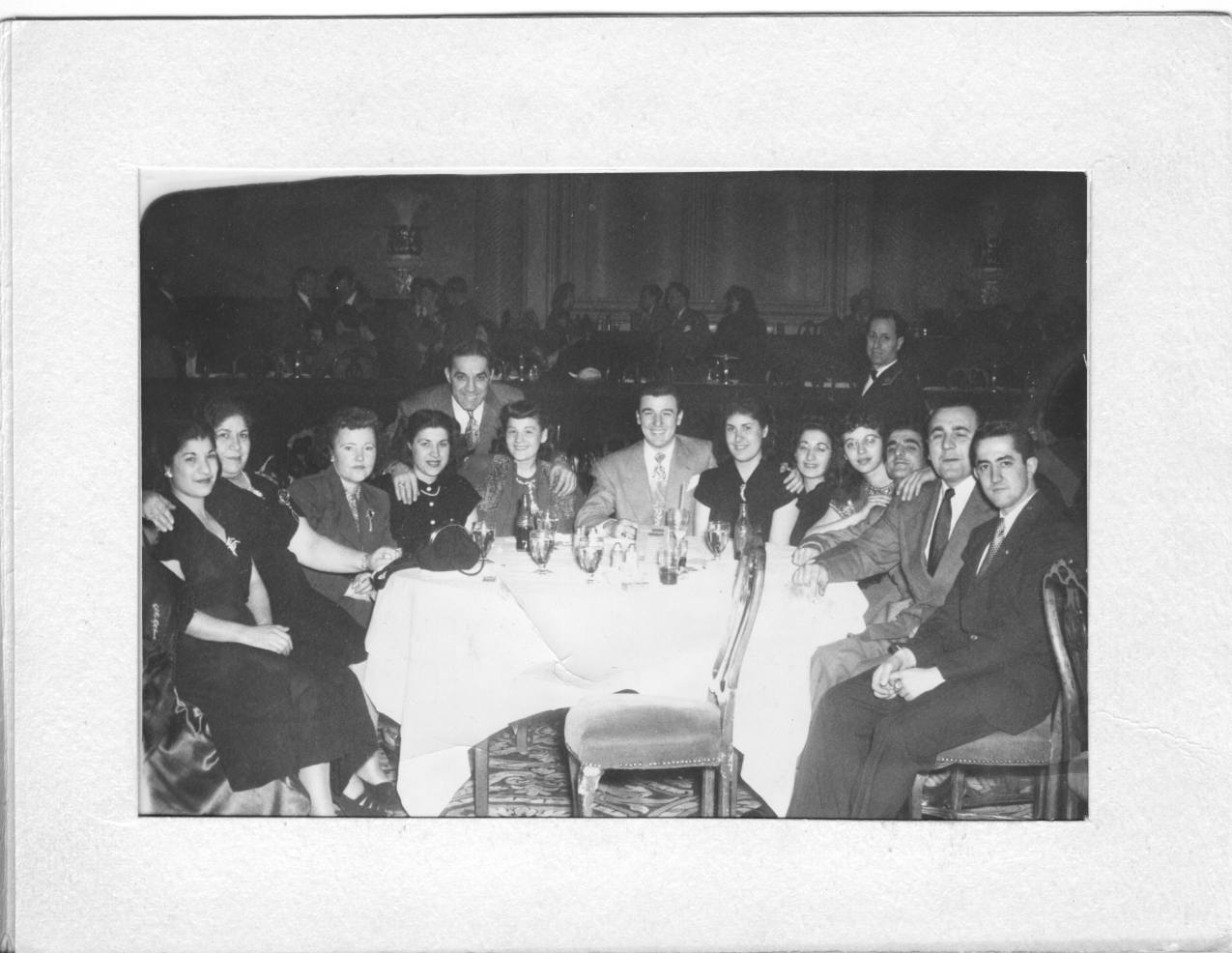
Frankie Carle (center-left, standing) at the Hotel Pennsylvania in Manhattan

Frankie Carle (born Francis Nunzio Carlone, March 25, 1903 – March 7, 2001) was an American pianist and bandleader. As a very popular bandleader in the 1940s and 1950s, Carle was nicknamed "The Wizard of the Keyboard" for his piano skills. "Sunrise Serenade" was Carle's best-known composition, rising to No. 1 in the US in 1938 and selling more than one million copies.

== Early life ==
Carle was born in Providence, Rhode Island, on March 25, 1903. The son of a factory worker who could not afford a piano, he practiced on a dummy keyboard devised by his uncle, pianist Nicholas Colangelo, until he found a broken-down instrument in a dance hall. In 1916, a teenage Carle began working with his uncle's band as well as a number of local bands in the Rhode Island area. To ease acceptance with the public, Carle did what many others with immigrant backgrounds did, he Americanized his name from Carlone to Carle.

== Career ==
Carle started out working with a number of mainstream dance bands. His earliest known recordings and performances were with the Edwin J. McEnelly Orchestra from 1924-1929. He wrote many of the arrangements for McEnelly as well as played piano. In 1934, he joined Mal Hallett and his orchestra. In 1935, he had his own orchestra and was billed in an ad for one night club as "America's Greatest Pianist."

He received attention when he joined Horace Heidt and His Musical Knights in 1939. He later became co-leader of the band. The popularity he attained while with Heidt's band allowed him to leave in 1944 and form his own, The Frankie Carle Orchestra. When his daughter, Marjorie Hughes, sang with his band, he did not reveal their relationship until Walter Winchell published it. His band disbanded after 1955 and he performed mainly as a soloist thereafter. From the 1950s until the 1980s, Carle performed as a single artist and maintained a close following of loyal fans.

Frankie Carle and others

During World War II, he participated in the V-Disc program, making recordings which were released by the U.S. War Department. He introduced V-Disc No. 210A which featured his new composition "Moonlight Whispers". "Sunrise Serenade" was released as a V-Disc by the U.S. War Department in July, 1944 as No. 230A in a new recording by Frankie Carle and his Orchestra.

=== Radio ===
Carle had early exposure on radio as pianist for The Four Belles singing group in transcribed programs distributed by the World Broadcasting System. In the mid-1940s, Carle and singer Allan Jones starred in the Old Gold Show on CBS radio. Carle also was featured in Pot o' Gold, Treasure Chest, and The Chesterfield Supper Club.

=== Television ===
During the summer of 1956 Carle hosted a music show on NBC. The 15-minute show, titled The Golden Touch of Frankie Carle, originated live from Hollywood, California.

=== Compositions ===
Carle's music was known for being light because of his buoyant touch; this resulted in romantic, danceable melodies which were very popular. His major compositions included "Sunrise Serenade", "Falling Leaves", "Oh! What It Seemed to Be", "Roses in the Rain", both recorded by Frank Sinatra, "A Lover's Lullaby", "Swing and a Miss", "Syncopated Doll", "This Day", "Travelin' Mood", "When Your Lips Met Mine", "Why Oh Why", "You Are There", "You and the Stars and Me", "Carle Boogie", "Sunrise Boogie", "Sunrise in Napoli", "Georgianna", "Blue Fantasy", "I Didn't Know", "The Golden Touch", "The Apple Valley Waltz", and "Moonlight Whispers" released as V Disc 210A in 1944 by the U.S. War Department.

== Later years and death ==
Carle died of natural causes in Mesa, Arizona, in 2001, a few weeks shy of his 98th birthday and is buried at Forest Lawn Memorial Park (Hollywood Hills). A Roman Catholic, Carle had a Mass of Christian burial at Holy Cross Church in Mesa, Arizona. He is survived by his daughter, Marjorie Hughes Wahl, granddaughter Susan Zimmerman, grandson Richard Douce, and great-granddaughter Veronica.

== Legacy ==
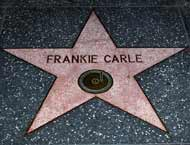
Carle's Star on the Hollywood Walk of Fame

In 1989, Carle was Inducted into the Big Band and Jazz Hall of Fame alongside such other greats as Glenn Miller and Benny Goodman. In 1968, he was inducted into the Rhode Island Heritage Hall of Fame. On February 8, 1960, he received a star on the Hollywood Walk of Fame (on the West Side of the 1700 Block of VINE, across from the Capitol Records Bldg.) The legendary pianist and educator Joanne Brackeen has credited him with inspiring her early self-studies on the instrument. In April 2016, Carle was posthumously inducted into the Rhode Island Music Hall of Fame (RIMHOF).

== Discography ==
=== Biggest hit singles ===
- A Little on the Lonely Side (vocal by Paul Allen) (1945)
- Saturday Night (Is the Loneliest Night of the Week) (vocal Phyllis Lynne) (1945)
- Oh! What It Seemed to Be (vocal Marjorie Hughes) (1946)
- One More Tomorrow (vocal Marjorie Hughes) (1946)
- Rumors Are Flying (vocal Marjorie Hughes) (1946)
- It's All Over Now (vocal Marjorie Hughes) (1946)
- Roses in the Rain (vocal Marjorie Hughes) (1947)
- Beg Your Pardon (vocal Marjorie Hughes) (1948)
- Cruising Down the River (vocal Marjorie Hughes & Sunrise Serenaders) (1949)

=== Albums ===
- Frankie Carle At the Piano, Columbia (C-23 78 RPM Set, 1942) No. 4 US
- Frankie Carle Encores, Columbia (C-70 78 RPM Set, 1943)
- Carle Comes Calling, Columbia (CL-6002 10" Lp, 1948) No. 2 US
- Roses in Rhythm, Columbia (CL-6032 10" Lp/C-174 78 RPM Set, 1949) No. 1 US
- Frankie Carle and his Girl Friends, Columbia (CL-6018 10" Lp/C-97 78 RPM Set, 1948) No. 4 US
- Frankie Carle Dance Parade, Columbia (CL-6047 10" Lp, 1949)
- At The Piano, Columbia (CL-6075 10" Lp, 1949)
- Carle Meets The Masters, Columbia (CL-6085 10" Lp, 1950) No. 10 US
- Frankie Carle Plays Honky Tonk, RCA Victor (LPM-26, 1951)
- Top Pops, RCA Victor (LPM-3024, 1952) No. 3 US
- For Me And My Gal, RCA Victor (LPM-3059, 1952)
- Frankie Carle's Piano Party, Columbia (CL-531, 1953)
- Honky Tonk Piano, RCA Victor (LPM-1188, 1956) No. 5 US
- Cocktail Time with Frankie Carle, RCA Victor (LPM-1221, 1956) No. 9 US
- Frankie Carle's Sweethearts, RCA Victor (LPM 1222, 1956)
- Mediterranean Cruise, RCA Victor (LPM-1275, 1956)
- Frankie Carle's Finest, RCA Victor (LPM-1153, 1957)
- Around The World, RCA Victor (LPM/LSP-1499, 1958)
- 37 Favorites For Dancing, RCA Victor (LPM/LSP-1868, 1958)
- Ridin' High, Vocalion (VL 3622, 1958)
- The Piano Style of Frankie Carle, RCA Camden (CAL 478, 1959)
- Show Stoppers for Dance Time, RCA Victor (LPM-1963, 1959)
- The Golden Touch, RCA Victor (LPM-2139, 1959)
- Take Me Along, RCA Victor (LSP-2142, 1959)
- A Carle-Load of Hits, RCA Victor (LPM/LSP-2148, 1959)
- Top Of The Mark (Featuring Darryl Stevens), RCA Victor (LPM/LSP-2233, 1960)
- The Fabulous Four Hands of Frankie Carle RCA Victor (LSP-2288, 1961)
- The Fabulous Frankie Carle (HL 7140, 1961)
- Honky-Tonk Hits by the Dozen, RCA Victor (LSP-2491, 1962)
- 30 Hits of the Flaming '40s, RCA Victor (LPM-2594, LSP-2594, c1963)
- 30 Hits of the Tuneful '20s, RCA Victor (LPM/LSP-2592, 1963)
- 30 Hits of the Thundering '30s, RCA Victor (LPM/LSP-2593, 1963)
- 30 Hits of the Fantastic '50s, RCA Victor (LPM/LSP-2881, c1964)
- Roses in Rhythm, Columbia (CL 913, 1963)
- Plays Cocktail Piano, RCA Custom (CPM/CSP-112, 1964)
- Frankie Carle Plays the Big Imported Hits, RCA Victor (LSP-2920, 1964)
- Frankie Carle Plays the Great Piano Hits, RCA Victor (LSP-3425, 1965)
- The Tropical Style of Frankie Carle, RCA Victor (LPM 3609, 1966)
- The Best of Frankie Carle, RCA Victor (LSP 3469, 1966)
- Frankie Carle, Dot (DLP 25789, 1967)
- Somewhere My Love, Dot (DLP 25802/25804, 1967)
- Sunrise Serenade, Harmony (HS 11217, 1967)
- Era: The 30s, Dot (DLP 25847, 1968)
- Era: The 40s, Dot (DLP 25877, 1968)
- Era: The 50s, Dot (DLP 25928, 1969)
- The Best Of Frankie Carle, RCA (ANL1-1079(e), 1975 reissue of LSP-3469)
- The Golden Touch Of Frankie Carle, Good Music Records (GMR80032, p1984)

== See also ==
- Ralph Patt, jazz guitarist who toured with Carle

== Bibliography ==
- Lagumina, Salvatore, et al. (2000). The Italian American Experience. Westport: Greenwood Press.
- Walker, Leo (1989). The Big Band Alamanac. Hollywood: Da Capo Press.
