= Less Than Jake discography =

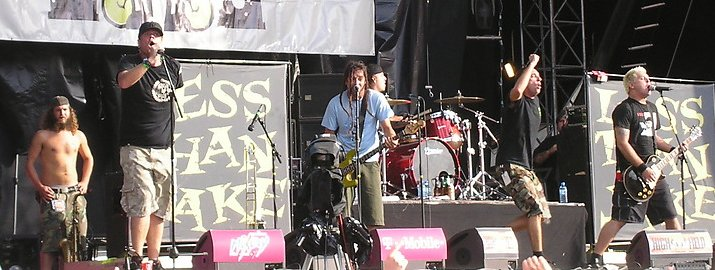
- Less Than Jake performing in August 2006. From left to right: JR, Roger, Vinnie, Buddy, Chris.
- Studio albums: 9
- Extended plays: 8
- Soundtrack albums: 23
- Live albums: 4
- Compilation albums: 5
- Singles: 17
- Video albums: 3
- Music videos: 13
- Demos: 2

The following is the discography of Less Than Jake, a Florida-based ska punk band.

Less Than Jake's first full-length LP Pezcore debuted in August 1995, featuring such staples as "Liquor Store" and "My Very Own Flag", originally on Dill Records. Shortly following the release of Pezcore, the band was signed to Capitol Records. They debuted on the major label in 1996 with Losing Streak. The album was full of the band's wry, fast-paced brand of ska-punk anthems, producing such fan favorites as "Johnny Quest Thinks We're Sellouts", "Jen Doesn't Like Me Anymore", and "Automatic".

In 1998 the band released Hello Rockview, one of their most acclaimed albums. In September 2000, the band released Borders & Boundaries. While it was neither as commercially successful or as musically appreciated as previous releases initially, the album was a display of significant growth for the band, showcasing much more mature music than the band had ever shown before. Still, the album provided fans with two instant hits in "Look What Happened" (which received minor airplay on college stations) and their hometown anthem, "Gainesville Rock City" (which received some airtime on MTV2).

Less Than Jake returned to major label status with their next album Anthem, releasing the 2003 LP on Warner Bros./Sire Records. It featured hit singles in both the US and the UK, with "She's Gonna Break Soon" (which spent a couple weeks on TRL), "The Science Of Selling Yourself Short" (#36 on the Billboard Modern Rock Tracks chart). The DVD retrospective "The People's History of Less Than Jake" appeared a month later, featuring both professional and bootleg recordings of the band, as well as home movies of the members' own creation.

In April 2006, the band released the four-song EP, Absolution for Idiots and Addicts, followed a month later with their next full-length, In with the Out Crowd, on Sire Records. The album, while still receiving generally positive reviews, was viewed far more negatively than compared to previous albums. On June 24, 2008, the band released GNV FLA on their own label Sleep It Off Records. This album was widely viewed as a welcomed return to the sound and musical style heard on their early records.

In 2011, members of the band stated their distaste for full-length studio albums, and suggested that the band will be releasing only EPs in the future. The band subsequently released Greetings from Less Than Jake in 2011 and its follow-up, Seasons Greetings from Less Than Jake in 2012. The band went back on their comments in 2013, and released the full-length album See the Light. Their EP Sound the Alarm was released in 2017, and in 2020, their latest album Silver Linings was released.

== Albums ==
=== Studio albums ===
List of studio albums, with selected chart positions
Title	Album details	Peak chart positions								
Title	Album details	US	US Alt.	US Indie	US Rock	AUS	SCO	UK	UK Indie	UK Rock
Pezcore	Released: August 22, 1995; Label: Dill; Formats: CD, LP	—	—	—	—	—	—	—	—	—
Losing Streak	Released: November 12, 1996; Label: Capitol (CDP 7243-8-37235-2-2); Formats: CD, LP, digital download	— (Note: Losing Streak did not enter the US Billboard 200, but peaked at number 18 on the US Billboard Heatseekers Albums Chart.)	—	—	—	—	77	89	18	—
Hello Rockview	Released: October 6, 1998; Label: Capitol (CDP 7243-8-57663-2-9); Formats: CD, LP, digital download	80	—	—	—	—	77	89	18	—
Borders & Boundaries	Released: October 24, 2000; Label: Fat Wreck Chords (FAT 616-2); Formats: CD, LP, digital download	103	—	4	—	—	—	99	12	—
Anthem	Released: May 20, 2003; Label: Sire (Sire 48386-2); Formats: CD, digital download	45	—	—	—	—	38	37	43	23
In with the Out Crowd	Released: May 23, 2006; Label: Sire (Sire 49984-2); Formats: CD, LP, digital download	78	—	—	—	85	68	55	—	3
GNV FLA	Released: June 24, 2008; Label: Sleep It Off/Cooking Vinyl; Formats: CD, LP, digital download	61	18	9	23	— (Note: GNV FLA did not enter the Australian ARIA Albums Chart but peaked at number 17 on the ARIA Hitseekers Chart.)	—	171	10	—
See the Light	Released: November 12, 2013; Label: Fat Wreck Chords; Formats: CD, LP, digital download	154	21	24	33	—	—	—	—	—
Silver Linings	Released: December 11, 2020; Label: Pure Noise; Formats: CD, LP, digital download	— (Note: Silver Linings did not enter the US Billboard 200, but peaked at number 18 on the US Billboard Current Album Sales Chart.)	25	44	50	—	—	— (Note: Silver Linings did not enter the UK Albums Chart, but peaked at number 45 on the UK Album Downloads Chart.)	34	8
"—" denotes album that did not chart or was not released

=== Live albums ===
Title	Album details
Bootleg a Bootleg, You Cut Out the Middleman	Released: 1999; Label: Fueled by Ramen; Formats: CD
Live from Uranus	Released: March 9, 1999; Label: Capitol; Formats: CD
Live at the Apple Store	Released: August 19, 2003; Label: Formats: Digital download
Losing Streak: Live	Released: March 1, 2011; Label: Sleep It Off; Formats: Digital download
Hello Rockview: Live	Released: March 1, 2011; Label: Sleep It Off; Formats: DVD, digital download
Live from Astoria	Released: April 29, 2016; Label: Rude; Formats: Digital, CD, LP

=== Compilation albums ===
List of compilation albums, with selected chart positions
Title	Album details	Peak chart positions		
Title	Album details	US	US Indie	CAN Alt.
Losers, Kings, and Things We Don't Understand	Released: April 22, 1996; Label: No Idea (No Idea 22); Formats: CD, LP	—	—	—
The Pez Collection	Released: December 14, 1999; Label: Moon Ska UK; Formats: CD, LP	—	—	—
Goodbye Blue and White	Released: February 19, 2002; Label: Fueled by Ramen; Formats: CD, LP	—	36	—
B Is for B-sides	Released: July 20, 2004; Label: Sire (Sire 48788-2); Formats: CD	157	—	46
Greetings & Salutations from Less Than Jake	Released: October 15, 2012; Label: Fat Wreck Chords; Formats: LP	—	—	—
"—" denotes album that did not chart or was not released

=== Demos ===
Title	Album details
Four Songs Demo	Released: 1992; Label: Self-Released; Formats: Cassette
Freebie Demo	Released: 1992; Label: Self-Released; Formats: Cassette

== EPs ==
List of EPs, with selected chart positions
Title	EP details	Peak chart positions					
Title	EP details	US	US Alt.	US Indie	US Rock	UK Indie	UK Rock
Making Fun of Things You Don't Understand	Released: 1995; Label: Far Out; Formats: 12" vinyl	—	—	—	—	—	—
Greased	Released: November 18, 1997; Label: No Idea; Formats: CD, LP	—	—	—	—	—	—
Pesto	Released: 1999; Label: Very Small; Formats: CD, LP	—	—	—	—	—	—
B Is for B-sides (Remixed)	Released: 2005; Label: Fueled by Ramen; Formats: CD, LP	—	—	—	—	—	—
Absolution for Idiots and Addicts	Released: March 14, 2007; Label: Fueled by Ramen; Formats: CD	—	—	—	—	—	—
TV/EP	Released: October 12, 2010; Label: Sleep It Off; Formats: CD, digital download	—	—	—	—	—	—
Greetings from Less Than Jake	Released: June 20, 2011; Formats: CD, Digital download	—	—	—	—	—	—
Seasons Greetings from Less Than Jake	Released: February 16, 2012; Formats: Digital download	—	—	—	—	—	—
Sound the Alarm	Released: February 3, 2017; Formats: Digital download, Streaming, CD, Vinyl	114	14	7	16	26	14
Uncharted	Released: November 15, 2024; Formats: Digital download, streaming, CD, vinyl	—	—	—	—	34	16
"—" denotes album that did not chart or was not released

== 7" vinyl ==
Title	Label
AAA/LTJ split 7″	Far Out
All My Best Friends Are Metalheads 7″	Golf
All My Best Friends Are Metalheads Jukebox 7″	Capitol
Bait and Switch: Vol. 1 (Note: Split with Bowling for Soup)	SBAM
Birthday Cake 7″	Fueled by Ramen
Birthday Cake 7″ (Moldy)	Fueled by Ramen
Cheese 7"	Fueled by Ramen
Cheese 7″ (Moldy)	Fueled by Ramen
Chicago Halloween 7″	Fueled by Ramen
Crash Course in Being an Asshole 7"	Rhetoric
Crash Course in Being an Asshole Picture Disc	Rhetoric
Dopeman / Johnny Quest Thinks We're Sellouts Jukebox 7″	Capitol
Food Not Bombs 7″	Fueled by Ramen
G-Man Training Target 7"	What Else?
G-Man/Crash Course in Being an Asshole double 7″	Rhetoric
I Think I Love You 7″ Flexi	Capitol
J Church/LTJ split 7″	Dead Beat
Kemuri/LTJ split 7″	Fueled By Ramen
Kemuri/LTJ double split 7″	Fueled By Ramen
Live From Chicago 7″	Capitol
Losing Streak b/w Mixology of Tom Collins 5″	No Idea
Madison 8″ Flexi	Fueled by Ramen
Making Fun of Things You Don't Understand 10″	Far Out
Megadeth/LTJ split 7″	Fueled by Ramen
Megadeth/LTJ split 7″ (Europe)	Fueled by Ramen
Muppets 7"	Liquid Meat
Pesto 7″	Too Many
Pez Kings 7″	Toybox
Pung/LTJ split 7″	No Idea
Punk TV LP	Red Dawg
Rock-n-Roll Pizzeria 7"	No Idea
Rock-n-Roll Pizzeria 7″ (Japan)	Nat
Slayer 7″	No Idea
Smoke Spot 7″	No Idea
Songs About Drinking double LP	Too Many
Sprocket Wheel/LTJ Split 7″	Snuffy Smile
Theme for Yo-Yo Ninja Boy 7″ Flexi	Erika
Three Way Split 7″	Toybox
Unglued 7″	No Idea
Viva La Vinyl vol. #2 LP	Dead Beat
Wood Panel Pacer Wagon with Mags LP + 7″	Too Many

== Singles ==
Title	Year	Peak chart positions					Album
Title	Year	US Mod	SCO	UK	UK Indie	UK Rock	Album
"Automatic"^{[A]}	1997	—	—	—	—	—	Losing Streak
"Dopeman"^{[A]}	1997	—	—	—	—	—	Losing Streak
"Dopeman" (Remix)^{[A]}	1997	—	—	—	—	—	Non-album singles
"Howie J. Reynolds"^{[A]}	1997	—	—	—	—	—	Non-album singles
"History of a Boring Town"^{[A]}	1998	39	—	—	—	—	Hello Rockview
"All My Best Friends Are Metalheads"	2000	—	49	51	8	—	Hello Rockview
"All My Best Friends are Metalheads" (Remix)^{[A]}	2000	—	—	—	—	—	Non-album single
"Gainesville Rock City"	2001	—	48	57	—	—	Borders & Boundaries
"She's Gonna Break Soon"	2003	—	48	39	—	—	Anthem
"The Science of Selling Yourself Short"	2003	36	89	78	—	11	Anthem
"Surrender"^{[A]}	2003	—	—	—	—	—	Anthem
"Overrated (Everything Is)" / "A Still Life Franchise"	2006	—	39	61	—	1	In with the Out Crowd
"The Rest of My Life" / "Don't Fall Asleep On The Subway"	2006	—	43	77	—	1	In with the Out Crowd
"P.S. Shock the World"	2006	—	40	96	—	—	In with the Out Crowd
"Does the Lion City Still Roar?"	2008	—	91	— (Note: "Does the Lion City Still Roar?" did not enter the UK Singles Chart, but peaked at number 95 on the UK Physical Singles Chart Top 100.)	16	—	GNV FLA
"Abandon Ship"^{[A]}^{[B]}	2008	—	—	—	—	—	GNV FLA
"My Money Is on the Long Shot"	2014	—	—	—	—	—	See the Light
"Do the Math"	2014	—	—	—	—	—	See the Light
"Lie To Me"	2020	—	—	—	—	—	Silver Linings
"—" denotes recording that did not chart or was not released

Notes

- A Released as a promotional single only.
- B Released in the UK only.

== Compilation appearances ==
Year	Song	Soundtrack	Label
1996	"Summer of '69" (Bryan Adams cover)	Wood Panel Pacer Wagon With Mags	Very Small Records
1997	"Cheese"	Liverache: Tales From The Livers' Edge	Very Small Records
1997	"I Think I Love You" (The Partridge Family cover)	Scream 2	Capitol Records
1997	"Grandma Got Run Over by a Reindeer" (Elmo & Patsy cover)	It’s a Punk and Ska Christmas Gone Wrong	Drive Thru Records
1997	We're All Dudes (Feat. Kel Mitchell)	Good Burger: Music From the Original Motion Picture	Capitol Records
1999	"Anchor"	Short Music for Short People	Fat Wreck Chords
2004	"The Brightest Bulb Has Burned Out" (feat. Billy Bragg)	Rock Against Bush, Vol. 1	Fat Wreck Chords
2020	"The Sit Around"	Ska Against Racism	Bad Time Records; Asian Man Records

== Video releases ==
Year	Album details
2002	Avant Tarde: Released: 2002; Label: Fueled by Ramen; Formats: VHS
2004	The People's History of Less Than Jake: Released: August 10, 2004; Label: Fueled by Ramen; Formats: DVD
2011	Anthology: Released: 2011; Label: Sleep It Off; Formats: DVD

== Music videos ==
Year	Single	Album
1996	"Automatic"	Losing Streak
1996	"Dopeman"	Losing Streak
2000	"All My Best Friends Are Metalheads"	Hello Rockview
2001	"Gainesville Rock City"	Borders & Boundaries
2003	"She's Gonna Break Soon"	Anthem
2003	"The Science of Selling Yourself Short"	Anthem
2006	"Overrated (Everything Is)"	In with the Out Crowd
2006	"The Rest of My Life"	In with the Out Crowd
2008	"Does the Lion City Still Roar?"	GNV FLA
2009	"Conviction Notice"	GNV FLA
2012	"Goodbye, Mr. Personality"	Greetings & Salutations
2013	"My Money Is on the Long Shot"	See the Light
2014	"Do the Math"	See the Light
2017	"Bomb Drop"	Sound The Alarm
2020	"Lie to Me"	Silver Linings
2020	"Keep on Chasing"	Silver Linings
