= GNV FLA =

Studio album by Less Than Jake
- Released: June 24, 2008
- Recorded: March–April 2008
- Studios: Atlas, Chicago, Illinois
- Genres: Ska punk; pop-punk
- Length: 34:58
- Label: Sleep It Off
- Producers: Matt Allison; Roger Lima

Less Than Jake chronology
In with the Out Crowd (2006)	GNV FLA (2008)	TV/EP (2010)

Singles from GNV FLA
- 1. "Does the Lion City Still Roar?" Released: June 30, 2008

GNV FLA is the seventh studio album by American rock band Less Than Jake, released on June 24, 2008, on their own label, Sleep It Off Records. Following the poor reception to their sixth studio album In with the Out Crowd (2006), the band started writing material for its follow-up less than a year later. They set up Sleep It Off Records after leaving Sire Records and recorded their next album in March and April 2008. It was produced by both Matt Allison and the band's co-lead vocalist and bassist Roger Lima. GNV FLA is a ska punk and pop-punk album that recalls the sound of the band's third studio album, Hello Rockview (1999).

GNV FLA received generally favorable reviews from critics, many of whom praised the return to Less Than Jake's earlier sound, while others complimented the songwriting. The album peaked at number 61 on the Billboard 200 in the United States, after selling over 10,000 copies in its first week. "Does the Lion City Still Roar?" was released as the album's lead single; coinciding with this, the band went on a US tour with Goldfinger until August 2008. They toured Canada with Reel Big Fish and ended the year with an appearance at The Fest. In early 2009, they toured Australia as part of the Soundwave festival, and went on a US East Coast tour with the Expendables, leading to performances on the Warped Tour.

== Background and writing ==
Less Than Jake released their sixth studio album, In with the Out Crowd, in May 2006 through Sire Records, peaking at number 78 on the Billboard 200 in the United States. The band had disagreements with the producer of the album, who wanted a rock sound, whereas they wanted a different sound. The album was poorly received by their fans; trombonist Buddy Schaub said the band was equally dismissive of it. While touring in support of the album, the band would only play a few songs from it live, instead opting to focus on the rest on their past releases. In February 2007, the band performed a series of shows where they played a few of the albums from their back catalogue in their entirety.

In March 2007, the band said it would a "writing year for us", hoping to release an album the following year. Two months later, they announced that they had left Sire and its parent company Warner Music Group. In July and August 2007, the band went on a co-headlining US tour with Reel Big Fish. Following this, work on a new album began in earnest. They wrote material in a warehouse where they practiced and at Lima's house; they recorded rough sketches that the members used as a reference to suggest ideas for. Drummer Vinnie Fiorello said the full-album shows "set a good direction in writing new songs". In September and October 2007, they embarked on a tour of the UK and Japan, and ended the year with an Australian tour.

== Label and recording ==
In January 2008, the band started their own label, Sleep It Off, through which they reissued their back catalogue. Alongside this, Fiorello revealed that they were allowed to leave their contract with Warner, despite still owing them another album. He mentioned that when they were on Sire, some members wanted opportunities such as radio play and MTV appearances, while others did not; being on their own label would allow them to find a common goal. Fiorello mentioned that the band potentially could have worked with labels such as Fat Wreck Chords and Epitaph Records, but they felt they had experience between them that they should self-release it.

At Sleep It Off, Lima described each members' role: frontman Chris DeMakes "doesn’t really do that much, he’s the lead singer he’s allowed to do whatever he wants"; Lima tackles audio; Schaub handles video content; saxophonist Peter "JR" Wasilewski does the online aspect; and Fiorello "deals with everything else", with assistance from their publicist Rey Roldan. The album was recorded between March and April 2008 with producer Matt Allison at Atlas Studios in Chicago, Illinois. The workdays typically consisted of midday to midnight hours. Lima co-produced the sessions; Allison also acted as engineer and mixed the recordings, before the album was mastered by Howie Weinberg at Masterdisk in New York City.

== Composition and lyrics ==
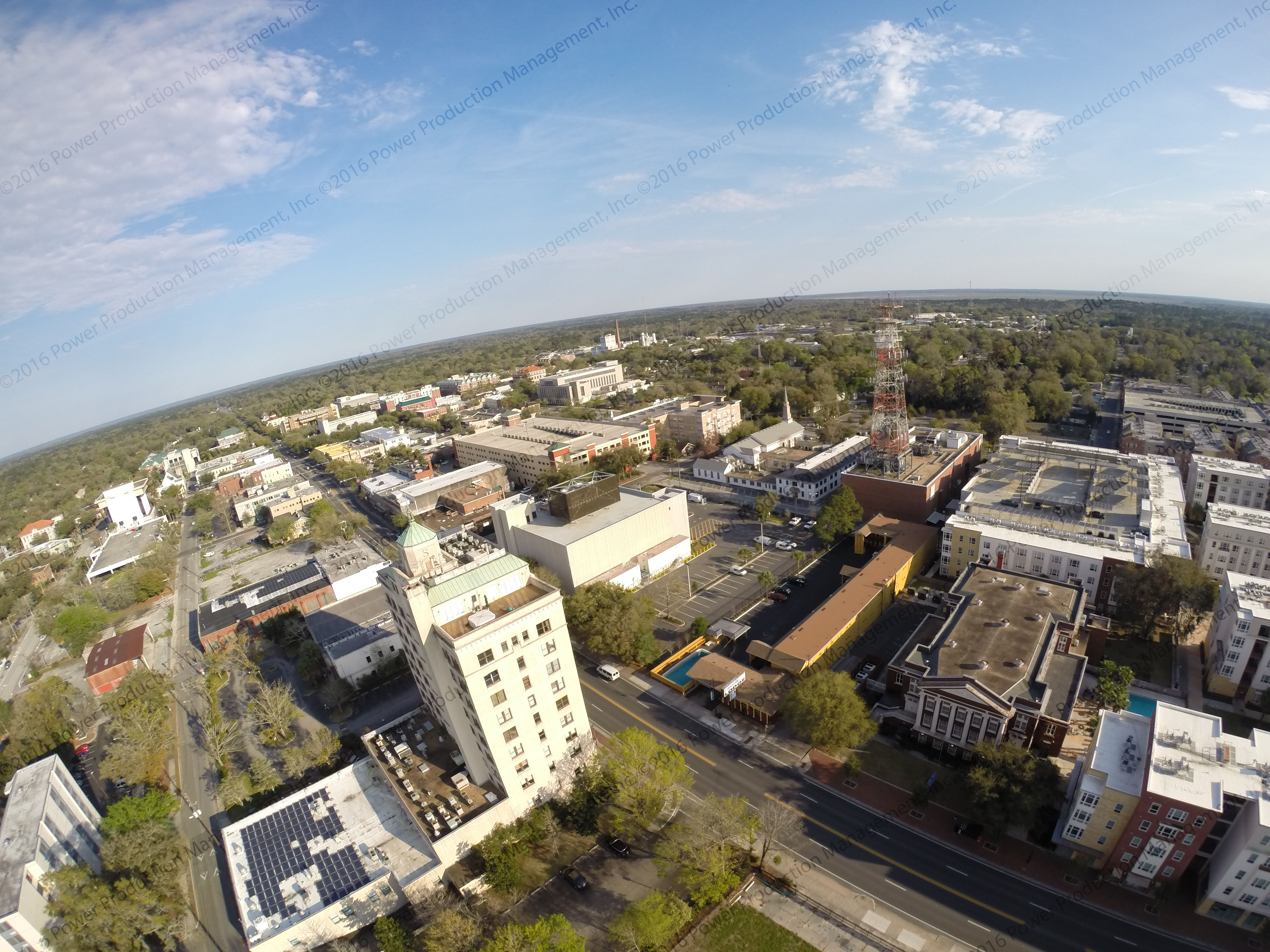
GNV FLA, the album's title, alludes to the band's hometown of Gainesville, Florida (pictured in 2017).

=== Themes and music ===
The album's title is an abbreviation of the band's hometown, Gainesville, Florida. Corey Apar from Allmusic writes that: "Less Than Jake have essentially created a bittersweet tribute to their hometown of Gainesville, sparing no detail in naming the album GNV FLA, stringing the liner notes together with bleak snapshots of the city, and littering song names and lyrics with nods to both the state of Florida and the beloved college town of their inception." Sputnikmusic staff writer Dave de Sylvia said "in recent years, [Gainesville has] become a hotbed for property development as generic suburbia replaces the individual character the city used to possess". In the album's liner notes, the band thank the city, calling it: "the town that inspired the record."

DeMakes and Lima wrote ideas acoustically for the album on their bus while touring; the pair would have a rough outline for a song, which the rest of the band then worked on. They left sections for horns that JR and Schaub would try to write some parts around these at the latter's house before showing the other members. DeMakes states that they came up with a "quintessential Less Than Jake record" and that the album includes "lots of horns and lots of vocals." Fiorello said they "wanted to make a record that had the urgency of earlier records but with tighter production". In a later interview, Fiorello considered it to be his least favorite Less Than Jake album. "I think I look at it as a transition record. [...] it was in the winter and my focus was a bit dark on the lyrical side. [...] I just feel the overall production is stiff and dark. [...] It was tribute to the state of Florida. I focused a lot on the darker side of what Florida has, instead of the good things. I concentrated on drug dealers and tourists and real estate scams and trailer parks and transients." Andrew Welsh of Daily Record said it was "[e]ssentially a concept album, GNV FLA turns the microscope on the seamier side of life in the Jakesters’ sun-kissed backyard".

Musically, the sound of GNV FLA has been described by Apar as ska punk, reminiscent of the band's third studio album, Hello Rockview (1999). Alex Young of Consequence of Sound referred to it as a pop-punk album where ska "only shines through a fraction". Apar said DeMakes and Lima "seamlessly switch off on vocals as driving power chords and sunny ska riffs alternately cut through hammering drumbeats, and high-spirited horns punch their way through it all". Some tracks, such as "Does the Lion City Still Roar?" and "This One Is Going to Leave a Bruise", lean on the punk side of ska punk. The lyrics touch on drunk nights, frustrations and time spent doing nothing. Fiorello said with the album he wished to "create a small movie based on a few different people. I wanted to make it a little more cinematic" than their past works. He took inspiration from the material of Billy Bragg, Elvis Costello and Bruce Springsteen: "I always refer back to those three particular people when it comes to just singing about normal people with normal problems". Fiorello mentioned that a majority of the album deals "economics and social-ness of small towns" in Europe and the US, as well as the "middle class that's shrinking because of how the economy is". Scott Klopfenstein of Reel Big Fish provided trumpet parts on the album, while Neil Hennessy of the Lawrence Arms contributed percussion.

=== Tracks ===
GNV FLA opens with "City of Gainesville", a reggae track that recalls the work of Sublime, and is followed by the up-tempo ska song "The State of Florida", which talks about Florida sinking into the ocean. "Does the Lion City Still Roar?", which was released ahead of the rest of the album, showed a reversal to the band's sound at the time. They had toned down the ska parts of their sound in favor of a basic rock approach since their fifth studio album, Anthem (2003). "Summon Monsters" is a socially satirical track with elements of punk rock that tackles kids and drugs. It includes a spoken-word portion from a friend of the band's. "Abandon Ship" is introspective grunge song with an uplifting chorus section. "Handshake Meet Pokerface" discusses a single mother trying to do anything for her children. Discussing the title, Fiorello said: "You're shaking someone's hand and you're smiling but that smile's your poker face".

"Settling Son" features metal guitar riffs in the style of Avenged Sevenfold. "Malachi Richter's Liquor's Quicker" talks about Malachi Richter, a person that self-immolate as a protest against the Iraq War. Fiorello said: "it has everything to do with being at the end of your rope and thinking that the only thing you can do is fucking light yourself on fire to end it all". It features morse code because of a sample the band had included in the track, which translates to "We may lose hope but there's always hope", which was Richter's mission statement. "Golden Age of My Negative Ways" and "The Space They Can't Touch" are two ska songs, the latter of which evokes Panic! at the Disco during the chorus section. "The Life of the Party Has Left the Building", a short introductory song akin to "City of Gainesville", bookends the party song "This One Is Going to Leave a Bruise" and the aggressive closing track, "Devil in My DNA". The latter was reminiscent of the work of NOFX.

== Release ==
On April 23, 2008, GNV FLA was announced for release in two months' time; its track listing was posted online. Shortly afterwards, the band appeared at The Bamboozle festival. "Does the Lion City Still Roar?" was posted online on May 26, 2008, followed by "Abandon Ship" two weeks later. Preceded by a few shows with the Swellers, Mustard Plug and Suburban Legends, the band went on the Sleep It Off Tour with Goldfinger, Westbound Train, Suburban Legends, and Big D and the Kids Table until August 2008. GNV FLA was made available for streaming, as well as being released on June 24 through Sleep It Off Records. Fiorello's idea for the artwork was taking black-and-white photographs and adding on top "this world that's around Gainesville that you wouldn't necessarily see to the naked eye, but that's there, this sort of hyper-reality". When he contacted Richard Minino of production company Horsebites with this concept in mind, Minino was enthusiastic about the project. It was distributed in the UK through the label Cooking Vinyl. "Does the Lion City Still Roar?" was released as a single on June 30, with "All Time Low" and a demo of "Handshake Meets Pokerface" as the B-sides; a music video was released for the "Does the Lion City Still Roar?" on August 4, 2008.

Following this, Less Than Jake appeared at the Pukkelpop festival. In September and October 2008, the band performed some shows with Rancid and other shows with the Ergs!. They went on a Canadian tour with Reel Big Fish, the Flatliners, and the Real Deal. After appearing at The Fest, "Abandon Ship" was released as a single on November 3. On November 11, 2008, a deluxe 7" vinyl box set edition of the album was released. It featured demo, live or acoustic versions of songs on the album, as well as B-sides from the singles. In addition, it included a copy of the album on CD, a poster and a DVD that featured live and studio footage of the band. In February and March 2009, the band toured Australia as part of the Soundwave festival, and then appeared at the Harvest of Hope Fest in the US. Later that month, the band went on a US East Coast tour with the Expendables. Further dates were added to the tour, extended it into April, which was followed by a short tour of Japan as part of the Punk Spring touring festival. Between late June and late August, the band performed on the Warped Tour. In November and December 2009, they went on a US tour with the Casualties, the Swellers, Cage and Fishbone. In March 2010, the band appeared at the Extreme Thing festival.

== Reception ==
Professional ratings
Review scores
Source	Rating
AllMusic	4/5 stars
Alternative Press	3.4/5
Consequence of Sound	D+
Ox-Fanzine	7/10
Sputnikmusic	4/5
Ultimate Guitar	8.3/10

GNV FLA was met with generally favorable reviews from music critics. AllMusic reviewer Corey Apar said the band did what other acts in "similar situations do -- reach back to their roots and prove to fans that, despite any past musical transgressions, the band they loved so much years ago is back". He felt that the mix of "regret, defiance, disillusionment, and affection [...] makes GNV FLA seem like the album Less Than Jake needed to make, not just as a tribute to their past in Gainesville". Alternative Press writer Ben Conoley said from the album's opening moments "there is little doubt the band are looking to turn back the clocks to a time when they were ska-punk’s spokesmen for the young and directionless". He added that apart from "a few duds ... GNV FLA is an entirely fun album, arriving just in time for summer". Welsh noted that the band "adopt[ed] a universal approach that will no doubt appeal to the everyman living in other depressed, and depressing, small US cities".

The staff at Ultimate Guitar wrote that "instrumentally Less Than Jake have delivered for their older fans", while lyrics retain the form from In with the Out Crowd, "[t]his way they can please the newer fans as well as those from the Hello Rockview era". Ink 19 reviewer Jen Cray called it a "release to satisfy every generation of Less Than Jake fans". Cleveland Scene's Michael Gallucci wrote that it "sounds pretty much like the group's other records: lots of tight, two-and-a-half-minute brass-accented songs that often play the goof card". Sylvia thought that the album was "arguably their strongest set of songs to date, 14 [...] tracks that blend together seamlessly with only the odd lull in quality towards the middle". Lauri Wessel of Ox-Fanzine wrote that it was "an attempt to return" to the band's trademark sound, and it was one of their better releases, "but not the best due to some gap fillers in the middle". Young found it to be a "modern take and a more polished" version of their debut studio album, Pezcore (1995), but the "down side? Their nostalgic memorabilia cannot suppress what looks to be another shotty pop punk album of the ’00s, with a few minor gems".

GNV FLA debuted at number 61 on the Billboard 200 and at number 9 on the Independent Albums charts, selling over 10,000 copies in its first week. Punknews.org ranked the album at number 17 on their list of the year's 20 best releases.

== Track listing ==
All songs written by Less Than Jake.

No.	Title	Length
1.	"City of Gainesville"	1:53
2.	"The State of Florida"	2:15
3.	"Does the Lion City Still Roar?"	2:41
4.	"Summon Monsters"	2:42
5.	"Abandon Ship"	3:29
6.	"Handshake Meet Pokerface"	2:41
7.	"Settling Son"	3:01
8.	"Malachi Richter's Liquor's Quicker"	2:37
9.	"Golden Age of My Negative Ways"	1:40
10.	"The Space They Can't Touch"	2:53
11.	"Conviction Notice"	2:34
12.	"This One Is Going to Leave a Bruise"	2:25
13.	"The Life of the Party Has Left the Building"	0:39
14.	"Devil in My DNA"	3:28

== Personnel ==
Personnel per booklet.

Less Than Jake

- Chris DeMakes – vocals, guitars
- Roger Lima – vocals, bass
- Vinnie Fiorello – drums
- Buddy Schaub – trombone
- Peter "JR" Wasilewski – saxophone

Additional musicians

- Scott Klopfenstein – trumpet
- Neil Hennessy – percussion

Production and design

- Matt Allison – producer, engineer, mixing
- Roger Lima – co-producer
- Howie Weinberg – mastering
- Vinnie Fiorello – art direction
- Horsebites – illustration, layout
- Dennis Ho – photography

== Charts ==
Chart performance for GNV FLA
Chart (2008)	Peak position
UK Independent Albums (Official Charts)	10
US Billboard 200	61
US Independent Albums (Billboard)	9
