= In with the Out Crowd =

Studio album by Less Than Jake
- Released: May 23, 2006
- Recorded: November–December 2005
- Studios: Bay 7, Valley Village, California; Sparky Dark, Calabasas, California
- Genres: Pop punk; ska punk; pop rock
- Length: 39:08
- Label: Sire
- Producer: Howard Benson

Less Than Jake chronology
| Anthem (2003) | In with the Out Crowd (2006) | GNV FLA (2008) |

Singles from In With the Out Crowd
- 1. "Overrated (Everything Is)" Released: March 1, 2006; 2. "The Rest of My Life" Released: August 28, 2006; 3. "P.S. Shock the World" Released: November 13, 2006

In with the Out Crowd is the sixth studio album by American ska-punk band Less Than Jake, released on May 23, 2006 on Sire Records. Produced by Howard Benson, who had previously worked with the band on their third studio album, Hello Rockview (1998), the album was preceded by the single "Overrated (Everything Is)" and an EP of material recorded during the same sessions, entitled Absolution for Idiots and Addicts.

== Background and recording ==
In September and October 2005, the band went on a short tour, leading up to recording of their next album. During it, they performed a few of the 20 songs they had written in the months prior.

Less Than Jake recorded their next album in November and December 2005. Sessions were held at Bay 7 Studios in Valley Village, California and Sparky Dark Studio in Calabasas, California. With Howard Benson acting as producer, Mike Plotnikoff oversaw recording. Paul Decarli recorded horns and did Pro Tools editing with assistance from engineer Hatsukazu Inagaki. Benson also performed keyboards and did programming, while Lenny Castro played percussion. Plotnikoff mixed the majority of the songs at Glenwood Place Studios in Burbank, California with assistance from Ian Suddarth. Chris Lord-Alge mixed "Overrated (Everything Is)", "Fall Apart", "Hopeless Case" and "The Rest of My Life".

== Composition ==
Prior to the album's release, Vinnie stated that the album:

"won't be a throwback record. It isn't like anything we've done before. There's slow, The Specials influenced ska, very minor chord ska, over the top, catchy pop-punk, some Foo Fighters influences too. Doing the same record twice would short change the people who like the band. You know, things can't feel redone. You have to try to keep pushing the genre and the band style forward."

Similarly, guitarist, Chris Demakes, notes that the band:

"jumped out of the box a little bit and we did something a little different. I think we’re up to like 140 songs as a band, and you release some songs and a bunch of kids bitch about it. “Oh, this band is over with!” It’s like, “We tried something different. If you like it, you like it. If you don’t, you don’t.”

Upon its release, drummer and lyricist, Vinnie Fiorello, described the record as "a mix of [previous albums] Hello Rockview, Borders and Boundaries and Anthem." The album is notable for featuring far less involvement from its horn section than on past albums. In an interview promoting the band's subsequent album, GNV FLA (2008), saxophonist JR noted, "There was a lot of backlash from our last record from a lot of our core fans. And whether it was deserved or not is neither here nor there. It's not worth fighting about, because my opinion of our last record has never changed; it's an awesome record, and I love it." The band wrote the majority of the songs, co-writing only four of them: "Soundtrack of My Life" and "Hopeless Case" with Shelly Peiken; "Overrated (Everything Is)" with Holly Knight; and "The Rest of My Life" with Mark Hoppus of +44.

== Artwork ==
The album artwork features a photo collage of pictures sent in by fans. The band members themselves are mixed throughout.

== Release ==
After Less Than Jake finished recording, they embarked on a tour of Australia to close out 2005. Following this, they embarked on a headlining US tour until March 2006, with support from Big D and the Kids Table, Rock n Roll Soldiers, Damone, and A Wilhelm Scream. On February 16, three songs – "Overrated (Everything Is)", "A Still Life Franchise" and "The Rest of My Life" – were posted on Alternative Press. The band asked fans to pick which one they think should be the album's first single. Eventually, "Overrated (Everything Is)" was chosen as the first single. On March 1, a live video of the group performing "Overrated (Everything Is)" was posted online. On March 10, "Soundtrack of My Life" was posted online after it had leaked on to peer-to-peer networks. Absolution for Idiots and Addicts, an EP, was released on March 14 featuring "Overrated (Everything Is)", "Negative Sides of Optimistic Eyes", "We, the Uninspired" and "The Rest of My Life". On March 22, the album's track listing was revealed, and the music video for "Overrated (Everything Is)" was released. During the filming, Demakes was arrested on location as the venue the band were shooting in, Topanga Plaza, had asked them to leave, and Demakes took longer than the rest.

From late March to late April, the band went on a tour of Europe, with Dropkick Murphys and Far from Finished. Bullets to Broadway supported on select dates; the trek included an appearance at the Groezrock festival. On April 11, "Let Her Go" was made available for streaming. An Overrated (Everything Is) EP, featuring the title-track, "A Still Life Franchise" and the non-album track "Only Human", was released on May 1. On May 20, In with the Out Crowd was made available for streaming via Warped Tour's website, and released three days later through Sire Records. A special edition of the album was also released, which featured a DVD and CD-ROM content that consisted of live versions, acoustic renditions, remixes, live videos and wallpapers. The band promoted it with a few instore appearances on the US East Coast. They headlined the 2006 edition of the Warped Tour in the summer. On August 8, a music video was released for "The Rest of My Life". On August 19, an animated video was released for "Overrated (Everything Is)", and an alternative version of the song was made available for streaming.

"The Rest of My Life" was released as a single on August 28, with "Don't Fall Asleep on the Subway" as the B-side. In September and October, the group went on a headlining US tour titled the Circus of Outcasts and Idiots. For the first half, they were supported by New Mexican Disaster Squad, the Loved Ones and Catch 22. For the remaining half, New Mexican Disaster Squad was replaced by Set Your Goals. Following the trek, they toured across Japan with Kemuri, and then Australia with A Wilhelm Scream. "P.S. Shock the World" was released as a single on November 13, with a live version of the song as the B-side. Coinciding with this, the band supported Dropkick Murphys on their tour of the UK. In April 2007, they played three US East Coast shows, prior to a short, four-date tour in Brazil. On May 21, 2007, the band announced they had left Sire. Fiorello explained: "It became obvious to me and everyone else that its time to move on and in a new direction as band." In June 2007, they played a variety of European festivals, including Greenfield, Nova Rock, and Mach 1. In July and August 2007, the band went on a co-headlining US tour with Reel Big Fish, with support from Streetlight Manifesto and Against All Authority.

== Reception ==
Professional ratings
Review scores
| Source | Rating |
|---|---|
| AllMusic | 3/5 stars |
| Entertainment Weekly | C+ |
| Melodic | 3/5 stars |
| News & Review | Mixed |
| Ox-Fanzine | 8/10 |
| Punknews.org | 2/5 stars |
| Rock Hard | 8/10 |
| Ultimate Guitar | 7.3/10 |

The album reached number 78 on the Billboard charts.

In 2016, bass guitarist Roger Lima reflected on his dissatisfaction with the overall writing and recording process, stating: "I wanted to write songs that were a little bit faster, edgier and more punk rock sounding, but the producer that we were working with at the time, Howard Benson, who we’d worked with previously on Hello Rockview, was kind of curving us in the direction of a softer, more slow-tempo mainstream sound. So this album kind of rubbed me in a bit of a weird way. Overall I like the songs, I just wish the production was a little bit more on the punk rock side of things, and I don’t feel like this album was the best representation of how we wanted to sound at that time.”

== Track listing ==
All songs written by Less Than Jake, except where noted.

| No. | Title | Writer(s) | Length |
|---|---|---|---|
| 1. | "Soundtrack of My Life" | Less Than Jake, Shelly Peiken | 2:59 |
| 2. | "A Still Life Franchise" | | 3:28 |
| 3. | "Overrated (Everything Is)" | Less Than Jake, Holly Knight | 3:10 |
| 4. | "Fall Apart" | | 3:09 |
| 5. | "In-Dependence Day" | | 2:48 |
| 6. | "Don't Fall Asleep on the Subway" | | 3:16 |
| 7. | "Landmines and Landslides" | | 2:58 |
| 8. | "The Rest of My Life" | Less Than Jake, Mark Hoppus | 3:33 |
| 9. | "Mostly Memories" | | 3:13 |
| 10. | "Let Her Go" | | 2:23 |
| 11. | "Hopeless Case" | Less Than Jake, Peiken | 3:58 |
| 12. | "P.S. Shock the World" | | 4:06 |

== Personnel ==
Personnel per booklet.

Less Than Jake

- Chris DeMakes – guitar, vocals
- Roger Lima – bass, guitar, vocals, Hammond Organ
- Vinnie Fiorello – drums
- Buddy Schaub – trombone, percussion
- Peter "JR" Wasilewski – saxophone, vocals

Additional musicians

- Howard Benson – keyboards, programming
- Lenny Castro – percussion

Production

- Howard Benson – producer
- Mike Plotnikoff – recording, mixing
- Chris Lord-Alge – mixing (tracks 3, 4, 8 and 11)
- Paul DeCarli – horns recording, Pro Tools editing
- Hatsukazu Inagaki – assistant engineer
- Ian Suddarth – mixing assistant
- Vinnie Fiorello – art direction
- Ellen Wakayama – art direction
- Chuck Anderson – artwork
- Jonathan Selig – layout

== Charts ==
Chart performance for In with the Out Crowd
| Chart (2006) | Peak position |
|---|---|
| Australian Albums (ARIA) | 85 |
| Canadian Albums (Nielsen SoundScan) | 113 |
| Scottish Albums (Official Charts) | 68 |
| UK Albums (Official Charts) | 55 |
| UK Rock & Metal Albums (Official Charts) | 3 |
| US Billboard 200 | 78 |
