= Muppet (disambiguation) =

The Muppets are puppet characters created by Jim Henson.

Muppet may also refer to:

- The Muppets, the media franchise, created by Jim Henson in 1976 which started in the television series
  - The Muppets Studio:
    - The Muppet Show, the first television series featuring the Muppets
    - The Muppets (2011 film), a 2011 film about the Muppets
    - The Muppets (TV series), the 2015 television series about the Muppets
    - The Muppet Show (2026 TV special), a reunion of the original show
- Music inspired by:
  - Muppets (EP), an EP by Less Than Jake
  - "Muppet", a 2010 single by Grasscut
