= Sound the Alarm =

Sound the Alarm may refer to:

- Sound the Alarm (band), an American rock band, or a 2005 album by the band
- Sound the Alarm (Booker T. Jones album), or the title song, 2013
- Sound the Alarm (The Dawn album), or the title song, 2009
- Sound the Alarm (Howie Day album), or the title song, 2009
- Sound the Alarm (Saves the Day album), or the title song, 2006
- Sound the Alarm (EP), by Less Than Jake, 2017
- "Sound the Alarm", a song by Anacrusis from Screams and Whispers, 1993
- "Sound the Alarm", a song by A Day to Remember from And Their Name Was Treason, 2005
- "Sound the Alarm", a song by Thievery Corporation from Radio Retaliation, 2008
