= Nervous in the Alley =

Nervous in the Alley may refer to:

- "Nervous in the Alley", a song by Less Than Jake from the album Hello Rockview
- "Nervous in the Alley", a song by Smash Mouth from the album Fush Yu Mang
