= History of a Boring Town =

Single by Less Than Jake

from the album Hello Rockview
- Released: 1998
- Genre: Ska punk
- Length: 3:23
- Songwriter(s): Vinnie Fiorello, Roger Lima, Derron Nuhfer, Pete Anna, Buddy Schaub, Chris DeMakes
- Producer(s): Howard Benson

Less Than Jake singles chronology
"Howie J. Reynolds" (1997)	"History of a Boring Town" (1998)	"All My Best Friends are Metalheads" (2000)

"History of a Boring Town" is a single by Less Than Jake. It is the seventh track on the band's third studio album Hello Rockview and was released as a single. The song reached number 39 on the Modern Rock Tracks chart.
