= All My Best Friends Are Metalheads =

"All My Best Friends are Metalheads"

Single by Less Than Jake

from the album Hello Rockview
- Released: 1999
- Recorded: 1998
- Genre: Ska punk; pop punk
- Length: 3:31
- Label: Capitol
- Songwriters: Vinnie Fiorello; Roger Lima; Chris Demakes
- Producer: Howard Benson

Less Than Jake singles chronology
"History of a Boring Town" (1998)	"All My Best Friends are Metalheads" (1999)	"Gainesville Rock City" (2001)

"All My Best Friends Are Metalheads" is a single by the American ska punk band Less Than Jake. It was released digitally in 1999 as well as on a limited edition 7 inch vinyl record during the Vans Warped Tour.

There are two versions of the intro to this song. In most cases, it starts with a clip from a Victor Lundberg speech called “An Open Letter to My Teenage Son.” The other is a clip from the documentary Heavy Metal Parking Lot.

On the UK Singles Chart, it got to number 51.

== Track listing ==
1. "All My Best Friends Are Metalheads (Radio Edit)" – 3:27
2. "Help Save The Youth Of America From Exploding (Live)" – 3:23
3. "Rock-N-Roll Pizzeria (Live)" – 2:14

== In popular culture ==
It is featured in the video games Street Sk8er and Tony Hawk's Pro Skater 4, and in the soundtrack for the 2000 film Digimon: The Movie. The song was also used in a demo reel of Craig Yoe's Yoe! Studio in the early 2000s.

== Personnel ==
- Chris DeMakes - guitar
- Roger Manganelli - bass guitar, lead vocals
- Vinnie Fiorello - drums, lyrics
- Buddy Schaub - trombone
- Derron Nuhfer - saxophone
- Pete Anna- trombone
