= Borders & Boundaries =

Studio album by Less Than Jake
- Released: October 24, 2000
- Recorded: February–April 2000
- Studio: Grand Master
- Genre: Ska punk
- Length: 40:58
- Label: Fat Wreck Chords
- Producer: Steve Kravac

Less Than Jake chronology
Hello Rockview (1998)	Borders & Boundaries (2000)	Anthem (2003)

Singles from Borders & Boundaries
- 1. "Gainesville Rock City" Released: 2000; 2. "Look What Happened" Released: 2000

Alternative cover
- 2012 reissue cover

Borders & Boundaries is the fourth studio album by ska punk band Less Than Jake. It was released October 24, 2000 on Fat Wreck Chords. The album was recorded at Grand Master Studios in Hollywood, CA, with producer Steve Kravac, and is the final studio album to feature saxophonist Derron Nuhfer and trombonist Pete Anna. The name of the album can be heard in a lyric from the opening track, "Magnetic North."

== Background and production ==
In January 2000, the band got together to write material for their next album. It marked a change from their previous two albums, which had been written while in the studio. Recording began in February 2000, and had concluded in April 2000.

Though the album has been described as ska punk, some reviewers noted a reduction in the ska elements. Drummer Vinnie Fiorello said "Look What Happened" was about "feeling like you're busting out to leave." "Gainesville Rock City" was inspired by the band's hometown of Gainesville, Florida. Fiorello said that "Pete Jackson Is Getting Married" was about saxophonist Derron Nuhfer; as Nuhfer didn't want his name used, the band opted to use Pete Jackson. Fiorello said the band were touring Australia at the time and came across Jackson, who was a popular farmer in the country. It features a xylophone, in an attempt to mimic wedding bells.

== Artwork ==
The cover art features a map of the area around their home city of Gainesville, Florida, while the booklet "cover" art features a photograph of trombonist Pete Anna saluting the Statue of Liberty. Included on some copies is a spinning wheel which tells you the distance between Gainesville and eight places around the world; Sydney, Los Angeles, Chicago, Seattle, Tokyo, London, Paramus, NJ, and Ljubljana, Slovenia.

== Release ==
On June 1, 2000, it was announced that Nuhfer had left the band. In July 2000, it was reported that the band was attempting to buy the album rights from Capitol, with the aiming of releasing it on an independent label. The band's drummer, Vinnie Fiorello, wrote about the matter on the liner-notes for Fat Wreck's 2009 greatest hits album, Wrecktrospective: "We recorded a full length for [Capitol Records] while the whole company got replaced, fired, or re-arranged, and in the process the new president there gave us the option of staying or going and taking the record with us." When the band were made aware that they could leave Capitol for another label, "there was only one label we wanted to go to and that was Fat." Around this time, it was announced that Pete Wasilewski of Spring Heeled Jack was filling in Nuhfer's position. On July 12, 2000, the band signed to Fat Wreck Chords.

They then embarked on a summer tour, which was divided into three parts: the first was supported by the Impossibles and New Found Glory, the second by the Ataris and Zebrahead, and the final by the Suicide Machines and One Man Army. On August 10, 2000, the album's artwork and track listing were revealed. Two days later, "Look What Happened" was posted on the label's website. After initially being scheduled for release in August 2000, and then September, Borders & Boundaries was eventually released on October 24, 2000. Following this, the band supported Bon Jovi on their US arena tour, before embarking on a tour of Japan, with support from local acts, and a stint in Europe with MxPx. In January and February 2001, the band played a short series of US shows with support from Against All Authority. In February and March 2001, the band went on a headlining US tour, dubbed the Tour of International Track & Field Champions, with support from New Found Glory, Anti-Flag, and Teen Idols. Between June and August 2001, the group performed on the Warped Tour. Trombonist Pete Anna left the band following the final date of Warped Tour on August 10, 2001. Later in the month, the band played three shows in the UK as part of the Extreme 2001 festival. In September, "Gainesville Rock City" was released as a single in the UK through Golf Records, with "History of a Boring Town", "Yo-Yo Ninja Boy", and the music video for "Gainesville Rock City".

Borders & Boundaries was reissued in October 2012 with the addition of demo versions of "Suburban Myth", "Magnetic North", and "Hell Looks a Lot Like L.A.".

== Reception ==
Professional ratings
Review scores
Source	Rating
AllMusic	2/5 stars
Drowned in Sound	10/10
Punknews.org	4/5 stars
Rock Hard	6.5/10

Mat Hocking of Drowned in Sound wrote that the band delivered "another 15-tracks of bouncy hard-edged ska-punk goodness in the form of Borders & Boundaries", with every song being "so darn catchy". The staff at Chart Attack noted that band "nixed the clanky guitars and overwrought horns", crafting an album "that just might be their best effort yet." They went on further to praise the album for having "enough balls to get the circle pit flying, but still has a ton of appeal to the ears." Ox-Fanzine's Randy Flame wrote that the band had nothing to prove after a few "great LPs", as a result, their fifth album saw the band "take off the accelerator significantly and reduce the amount of ska to a minimum." Though he mention that the reduction "sounds bad at first," the resulting album was "full of ingenious melodies", with "typical [...] choruses [that] have irrevocably burned into your brain". The staff at Rock Hard wrote that the band provided "snappy good-mood punk with a good dose of ska, stir catchy lively melodies and throw mostly up-tempo ingredients into the pot."

CMJ New Music Monthly writer Brett Milano found the album to sound "more produced and more commercial than anything they did for the majors." He suggested that if one "[a]dds in the bigger production and take away the ska, [... you'll] get within spitting distance of good old mainstream rock". In a retrospective review, Punknews.org staff member Joe Pelone found the album to be part of the band's "underrated period. Yeah, we loves Losing Streak and Hello Rockview, but Borders has some awesome rockers of its own," despite being not as "consistently memorable as Rockview". AllMusic reviewer Ron DePasquale said the album "borders on being overproduced," with lyrics that "trend more toward the trite and trivial." He added that the band's fans wouldn't be "disappointed, but purists might -- its safe sound reeks of a major-label record incognito."

The album reached No. 103 on the Billboard charts.

== Track listing ==
No.	Title	Length
1.	"Magnetic North"	2:59
2.	"Kehoe"	3:01
3.	"Suburban Myth"	2:25
4.	"Look What Happened"	3:34
5.	"Hell Looks a Lot Like L.A."	2:13
6.	"Mr. Chevy Celebrity"	1:42
7.	"Gainesville Rock City"	3:07
8.	"Malt Liquor Tastes Better When You've Got Problems"	2:24
9.	"Bad Scene and a Basement Show"	2:38
10.	"Is This Thing On?"	3:06
11.	"Pete Jackson Is Getting Married"	1:54
12.	"1989"	2:27
13.	"Last Hour of the Last Day of Work"	3:17
14.	"Bigger Picture"	2:41
15.	"Faction"	3:30

2002 UK re-release
No.	Title	Length
16.	"Help Save the Youth of America from Exploding" (Live)	3:22
17.	"Rock-n-Roll Pizzeria" (Live)	3:22
18.	"Down in the Mission" (Live)	2:17
19.	"Anchor / Sugar in Your Gas Tank" (Live)	2:51
20.	"Just Like Frank" (Live)	2:15
21.	"9th at Pine" (Live)	2:24
22.	"How's My Driving, Doug Hastings?" (Live)	1:26

2012 reissue
No.	Title	Length
16.	"Suburban Myth" (Demo)	2:22
17.	"Magnetic North" (Demo)	3:01
18.	"Hell Looks a Lot Like L.A." (Demo)	1:31

== Personnel ==
- Chris Demakes – vocals, guitar
- Roger Lima– bass guitar, vocals
- Vinnie Fiorello – drums, lyrics
- Buddy Schaub – tenor trombone
- Pete Anna – alto trombone
- Derron Nuhfer – additional baritone saxophone

== Charts ==
Chart performance for Borders & Boundaries
Chart (2000)	Peak position
UK Albums (Official Charts)	99
UK Independent Albums (Official Charts)	12
