= John Janick =

Music executive

- Born: John Joseph Janick; May 7, 1978 (age 48); Starkville, Mississippi, U.S.
- Education: University of Florida
- Occupation: Music industry executive
- Years active: 1996–present
- Title: CEO and chairman, Interscope Capitol Labels Group
- Spouse: Mia Janick
- Children: 3
- Awards: Billboard Power 100; 40 under 40; Hip Hop Power Players; Variety Executive of the Year

John Janick is an American record executive. He is the chairman and CEO of Interscope Capitol Labels Group.

Janick has been named to Billboard’s Power 100 list every year since 2014 and was named Variety's Hitmakers Executive of the Year in 2018. He worked with artists including Fall Out Boy, Panic! at the Disco and Paramore early in his career; Bruno Mars and Ed Sheeran while the head of Elektra Records, and Billie Eilish, Kendrick Lamar, Lady Gaga and Olivia Rodrigo at Interscope.

== Early life and education ==
Janick grew up in Port Charlotte, Florida. He was interested in music, not as a musician, but as a promoter.

In a 2018 interview with Entrepreneur, he said: "When I was a teenager, in the ’90s, I was really into underground music. I’d buy wholesale orders of CDs I loved and then sell them to friends for $10 apiece. Eventually I started putting together compilations. It wasn’t about making a profit as much as it was about turning people on to new music that I loved."

He attended the University of Florida.

== Career ==
=== 1996–2012: Fueled by Ramen, Elektra ===
In 1996, while a college freshman, Janick founded the independent record company Fueled by Ramen with Less than Jake drummer Vinnie Fiorello. Janick convinced the University of Florida to give him college credits for going on tour with Less than Jake on the Ska Against Racism Tour.

The label found early success with artist signings Fall Out Boy, Panic! at the Disco, and Paramore.

Janick was met with resistance in promoting his acts, and as a result opted for alternative methods for Fueled by Ramen such as online sales and social media promotion.

Fall Out Boy were the first to achieve sales success, and Panic! at the Disco went on to sell more than four million albums worldwide.

The success of Panic! at the Disco albums prompted Warner Music Group to buy Fueled by Ramen in 2008, and Janick was named co-president of the WMG label Elektra Records.

Janick signed Fun, Paramore and Twenty One Pilots to Fueled by Ramen, which he continued to run while at Elektra. He executive produced their albums, which went on to sell over one million records each. While at Elektra, Janick oversaw the careers of platinum artists Bruno Mars, Ed Sheeran, and Cee Lo Green.

=== 2012–present: Interscope Geffen A&M ===
In 2012, Janick was recruited by Interscope head Jimmy Iovine to join the label group as president and COO. In his first year at Interscope Geffen A&M, he helped lead the team that produced hits from Robin Thicke, Imagine Dragons, Maroon 5, Eminem and Kendrick Lamar. Janick himself signed Tame Impala and Selena Gomez, both of whom achieved commercial success.

When Iovine departed the label group in 2014, Janick was named chairman and CEO. He explained to Variety his philosophy for the music business: "What’s most important to me is being able to spend the time with an artist, and not just trying to get a song on every radio station. To do that, you have to keep the roster in check and make sure that you’re not doing what a lot of labels have done in the past, where you sign a bunch of things and see what sticks. You sign who you believe in, and you stick with them, like an indie label would."

Under Janick's direction, Interscope has entered into various label alliances including J. Cole’s Dreamville, producer/songwriter Benny Blanco’s Mad Love, LVRN, and The Darkroom.

In 2019, he oversaw releases from artists including Juice WRLD, Lady Gaga’s A Star Is Born soundtrack album, DaBaby, and breakout stars Billie Eilish and Summer Walker.

== Personal life ==
In October 2012, Janick underwent surgery for cancer, with a recurrence in October 2017 for which he received chemotherapy. At that same time, he had brain surgery to remove a benign pituitary adenoma. He fully recovered from both the cancer and the brain tumor.

Janick and his wife, Mia, have three children. They live in Los Angeles.

== See also ==
- Fueled by Ramen
- Interscope Records
