= Silver Linings =

Studio album by Less Than Jake
- Released: December 11, 2020
- Recorded: November–December 2019
- Studio: The Moat House (Gainesville)
- Genre: Ska punk
- Length: 36:42
- Label: Pure Noise; Epitaph (deluxe)
- Producer: Roger Lima; Less Than Jake

Less Than Jake chronology
Sound the Alarm (2017)	Silver Linings (2020)	Uncharted (2024)

Singles from Silver Linings
- 1. "Lie to Me" Released: October 1, 2020; 2. "Dear Me" Released: October 19, 2020; 3. "Anytime and Anywhere" Released: November 17, 2020

Silver Linings is the ninth studio album by American ska punk band Less Than Jake, released on December 11, 2020. It is their first studio album in little more than seven years (their longest time between albums), their first full-length release on Pure Noise Records and their first with new drummer Matt Yonker, who joined the band following founding member Vinnie Fiorello's departure in October 2018.

Recorded in November and December 2019 and mixed in February 2020, the record was delayed due to the impact of the COVID-19 pandemic on the music industry. The title and cover art were announced on October 1, 2020, along with the release of the first single "Lie to Me".

== Writing and production ==
The band members began to share demos between January and February 2019 and to discuss ideas mid-tour. By June and July, vocalists Chris DeMakes (also guitarist), Roger Lima (also bassist) and new drummer Matt Yonker began rehearsals. After they finished touring in October, they started to record the songs.

Following Fiorello's departure, lyrics were handled by DeMakes and Lima; the songs deal with more mature topics of the adult life. About the album's sound, DeMakes said: "If you love Less Than Jake, you're going to love the record. If you didn't like us before, it's not going to change your mind".

The album was recorded at Lima's The Moat House in Gainesville, Florida and was mixed and mastered by Jason Livermore at Blasting Room. Originally slated for an April release, Silver Linings suffered successive delays until the band pressured the label for a December release.

The track "Bill" is a tribute to drummer Bill Stevenson of Descendents and Black Flag fame.

== Critical reception ==
Professional ratings
Review scores
Source	Rating
Kerrang!	3/5 stars
Distorted Sound Mag	7/10 stars

Kerrang!'s Jake Richardson gave the album a 3/5 score and said "it's nothing big or clever", but that it "is still a welcome dose of positivity, and the kind of silver lining to our troubled times which offers hope that the good times will eventually return".

Writing for Distorted Sound Mag, Jack Fermor-Worrell said that "whilst in many cases you'd think the relative repetitiveness could end up fatigue-inducing, the relative brevity of the album [...] ensures that things never reach anything approaching boring. [...] Put simply, Silver Linings is on the whole yet another highly enjoyable LESS THAN JAKE record. [...] While those totally new to the band are perhaps still best off reaching for one of the classics, if you've ever liked anything LESS THAN JAKE have done before now, odds are you'll find Silver Linings an enjoyable time."

== Track listing ==
Silver Linings - Standard edition
No.	Title	Lead vocals	Length
1.	"The High Cost of Low Living"	DeMakes	2:39
2.	"Lie to Me"	Lima; DeMakes	3:38
3.	"Keep on Chasing"	DeMakes	3:03
4.	"Anytime and Anywhere"	Lima; DeMakes	2:30
5.	"The Test"	DeMakes	2:54
6.	"Dear Me"	DeMakes	3:17
7.	"Monkey Wrench Myself"	Lima; DeMakes	2:58
8.	"King of the Downside"	Lima	2:38
9.	"Lost at Home"	DeMakes	3:20
10.	"Move"	DeMakes	3:24
11.	"Bill"	DeMakes	3:03
12.	"So Much Less"	Lima	3:17
Total length:			36:42

Silver Linings - Deluxe edition bonus tracks
No.	Title	Lead vocals	Length
13.	"No One to Judge Me"	Lima; DeMakes	2:41
14.	"Empty Lines"	DeMakes; Lima	3:20
15.	"Anytime and Anywhere - Acoustic"		2:41
16.	"Dear Me - Acoustic"		3:10
17.	"The High Cost of Low Living - Acoustic"		2:41
18.	"Move - Acoustic"		3:16
Total length:			54:38

== Personnel ==
Less Than Jake

- Chris DeMakes – guitar, vocals, production
- Roger Lima – bass, guitar, vocals, production
- Buddy Schaub – trombone, production
- Peter "JR" Wasilewski – tenor saxophone, production
- Matt Yonker – drums, production

Additional contributors

- Jason Livermore – mastering, mixing
- Michael "Mo" LaPierre – engineering assistance
- Peter Wonsowski – art
- Paris Visone – photo

== Charts ==
Chart (2020)	Peak position
UK Albums Chart Update (OCC)	97
UK Independent Albums (OCC)	34
UK Rock & Metal Albums (OCC)	8
US Independent Albums (Billboard)	44
US Top Album Sales (Billboard)	54
US Top Alternative Albums (Billboard)	25
US Top Rock Albums (Billboard)	50
