= See the Light (Less Than Jake album) =

Studio album by Less Than Jake
- Released: November 12, 2013
- Recorded: 2013
- Studio: The Moathouse
- Genre: Ska punk; punk rock
- Length: 36:35
- Label: Fat Wreck Chords
- Producer: Roger Lima

Less Than Jake chronology
Greetings & Salutations from Less Than Jake (2012)	See the Light (2013)	Sound the Alarm (2017)

See the Light is the eighth studio album by American ska punk band Less Than Jake, released on November 12, 2013.

== Writing and recording ==
Regarding the album, guitarist and vocalist Chris DeMakes said: "See the Light is pure Less Than Jake. 13 songs that were written, recorded and produced in our hometown of Gainesville, Florida. You never know what people are going to think when you release new music. All you can do is what comes from your heart and we feel like we have accomplished what we set out to do with these new songs. Hopefully our fans will feel the same passion for this album as we do." Bassist and vocalist Roger Lima added: "[this album]'s all new songs and new vibes, only recorded in our old school way."

Then drummer and songwriter Vinnie Fiorello called the lyrics "super-positive". He also ranked it his favorite Less Than Jake album because it was their first album in a long time with no input from outside the band. They produced and wrote it all by themselves. He also says the band applied every lesson it learned in previous albums. Lima co-produced the album with the rest of the band at the Moathouse; he also acted as an engineer with Matt Yonker. Jason Livermore mixed and mastered the album at the Blasting Room.

Lima reverberated that, stating it was a "back to basics" album because they did not have any kind of orientation when they started. He also described the artwork:

We're basically inviting everyone in to literally see the light—find the positivity in something, find your own path, enjoy the trip, and make something happen that’s worthwhile. That is basically the whole concept. You know, I'm glad it's a general thing and that fans can interpret it in their own individual way [...]

== Promotion and release ==
The album release was supported by a North American tour, and the band is also planning some shows in Canada, Southeastern United States, Japan, Brazil and the United Kingdom. "Do the Math" was released to radio on June 2, 2014, and released as a single on June 10 with "Connect the Dots" as the B-side. "American Idle" was released as a single, with "Late Night Petroleum" as the B-side, on January 20, 2015.

== Track listing ==
Track listing per booklet.

No.	Title	Length
1.	"Good Enough"	2:50
2.	"My Money is on the Long Shot"	2:55
3.	"Jump"	3:01
4.	"The Loudest Songs"	2:28
5.	"Do the Math"	3:17
6.	"Bless the Cracks"	3:18
7.	"John the Baptist Bones"	2:30
8.	"American Idle"	3:28
9.	"The Troubles"	2:25
10.	"Give Me Something to Believe In"	2:45
11.	"Sunstroke"	3:09
12.	"A Short History Lesson"	1:50
13.	"Weekends All Year Long"	2:43

== Charts ==
Chart (2013)	Peak position
US Billboard 200	154
US Top Rock Albums (Billboard)	33
US Top Alternative Albums (Billboard)	21
US Independent Albums (Billboard)	24

== Personnel ==
Personnel per booklet.

Less Than Jake

- Chris DeMakes – vocals, guitar
- Roger Lima – vocals, bass
- Vinnie Fiorello – drums
- Buddy Schaub – trombone
- Peter "JR" Wasilewski – tenor saxophone

Production and design

- Roger Lima – producer, engineer
- Less Than Jake – producer
- Jason Livermore – mixing, mastering
- Matt Yonker – engineer
- Horsebites – layout, design
