= Uncharted (EP) =

EP by Less Than Jake
- Released: November 15, 2024
- Recorded: 2023–2024
- Studio: The Blasting Room, Fort Collins
- Genre: Ska
- Length: 22:15
- Label: Pure Noise
- Producer: Bill Stevenson

Less Than Jake chronology
Silver Linings (2020)	Uncharted (2024)

Singles from Uncharted
- 1. "Broken Words" Released: June 20, 2024; 2. "Walking Pipebomb" Released: July 31, 2024; 3. "Not My Problem" Released: August 20, 2024; 4. "Brand New Day" Released: September 10, 2024; 5. "Sunny Side" Released: October 8, 2024

Professional ratings
Review scores
Source	Rating
Distorted Sound	8/10
Kerrang!	3/5 stars

Uncharted is an EP by the American ska punk band Less Than Jake, released by Pure Noise Records on November 15, 2024. It is their first EP produced by Bill Stevenson, who is the drummer for the Descendents. It was announced on October 8, 2024, to coincide with the release of the single "Sunny Side". The EP debuted at number 34 on the UK Independent Albums chart and number 16 on the UK Rock & Metal Albums chart.

== Background ==
The band were reported to be in their recording studio throughout 2023 and 2024, alongside touring. On June 20, 2024, the first single, "Broken Words", was released, followed by "Walking Pipebomb" in July, "Not My Problem" in August, "Brand New Day" in September, and "Sunny Side" released alongside the EP announcement in October. All singles were released as 7-inch vinyl.

When discussing the album, the band said “When [we] started writing this EP, there was no intent for these songs to live together as a collection. As each song took life, we realized that the songs were more in tune with each other than we had originally thought. Six songs became seven and we were recording them with our one of our musical heroes (Bill Stevenson). It felt different - a feeling we hadn’t felt about a recording for some time. This EP represents a new chapter in the story of Less Than Jake. Forward we go into the Uncharted…”

== Track listing ==
All tracks are written by Less Than Jake.

Uncharted track listing
No.	Title	Lead vocals	Length
1.	"Broken Words"	Lima	2:52
2.	"Walking Pipebomb"	DeMakes; Lima	2:45
3.	"Not My Problem"	DeMakes	3:25
4.	"Brand New Day"	Lima; DeMakes	3:26
5.	"Sunny Side"	DeMakes; Lima	3:47
6.	"Dead Days (Over and Over)"	DeMakes	3:06
7.	"Shake Loose The Truth"	Lima	2:51
Total length:			22:15

== Personnel ==
Personnel per sleeve.

Less Than Jake

- Chris DeMakes – vocals, guitar
- Roger Lima – vocals, bass guitar
- Peter "JR" Wasilewski – tenor saxophone
- Buddy Schaub – trombone
- Matt Yonker – drums

Production and design

- Bill Stevenson – producer, engineer
- Jason Livermore – mixing, mastering

== Charts ==
Chart performance for Uncharted
Chart (2024)	Peak position
UK Album Sales (OCC)	98
UK Album Downloads (OCC)	67
UK Independent Albums (OCC)	34
UK Rock & Metal Albums (OCC)	16
US Current Alternative Albums	11
US Current Rock Albums	14
US Record Label Independent Albums	16
US Current Digital Albums	45
