= Sound the Alarm (EP) =

EP by Less Than Jake
- Released: February 3, 2017
- Studio: The Moathouse
- Genre: Ska punk; pop punk
- Length: 20:49
- Label: Pure Noise
- Producer: Roger Lima; Less Than Jake

Less Than Jake chronology
See the Light (2013)	Sound the Alarm (2017)	Silver Linings (2020)

Professional ratings
Review scores
Source	Rating
AllMusic	4/5 stars
Punknews.org	4/5 stars
Rock Sound	6/10 stars

Sound the Alarm is an EP by the American ska punk band Less Than Jake which was released on CD and (colored) 12" vinyl by Pure Noise Records on 3 February 2017. It was mixed and mastered by Jason Livermore at The Blasting Room, and co-produced by singer and bassist Roger Lima and the band at The Moathouse. It is the final release with Vinnie Fiorello on drums, before his departure in 2018.

== Track listing ==
Track listing per sleeve.

All tracks are written by Less Than Jake.

No.	Title	Lead vocals	Length
1.	"Call to Arms"	DeMakes	2:36
2.	"Whatever the Weather"	Lima	3:00
3.	"Bomb Drop"	DeMakes; Lima	3:06
4.	"Welcome to My Life"	Lima	2:43
5.	"Good Sign"	DeMakes	3:28
6.	"Years of Living Dangerously"	Lima	3:08
7.	"Things Change"	DeMakes; Lima	2:48
Total length:			20:52

== Personnel ==
Personnel per sleeve.

Less Than Jake

- Chris DeMakes – vocals, guitar
- Roger Lima – vocals, bass guitar
- Peter "JR" Wasilewski – tenor saxophone
- Buddy Schaub – trombone
- Vinnie Fiorello – drums

Production and design

- Roger Lima – producer, engineer
- Less Than Jake – producer
- Jason Livermore – mixing, mastering
- Doug Dean – art layout, design

== Charts ==
Chart (2017)	Peak position
UK Independent Albums (OCC)	26
UK Rock & Metal Albums (OCC)	14
US Billboard 200	114
US Independent Albums (Billboard)	7
US Indie Store Album Sales (Billboard)	22
US Top Alternative Albums (Billboard)	14
US Top Rock Albums (Billboard)	16
