= Anthem (Less Than Jake album) =

Studio album by Less Than Jake
- Released: May 20, 2003
- Recorded: October–December 2002
- Studio: Piety Street Recording, New Orleans; Morning View, Malibu, California
- Genre: Pop-punk; pop rock; ska punk
- Length: 40:09
- Label: Sire
- Producer: Rob Cavallo

Less Than Jake chronology
Borders & Boundaries (2000)	Anthem (2003)	In with the Out Crowd (2006)

Singles from Anthem
- 1. "She's Gonna Break Soon" Released: April 15, 2003; 2. "The Science of Selling Yourself Short" Released: July 1, 2003

Anthem (stylized as anthem.) is the fifth studio album by American ska punk band Less Than Jake, released on May 20, 2003 on Sire Records, a Warner Bros. imprint. A year after their fourth studio album Borders & Boundaries (2000), the band had spent sometime at their practice space writing new material; by the middle of 2002, the band said their next album would be with Warner Bros. Records. Following a meeting with Rob Cavallo, he was enlisted as the producer for the album. Sessions were held at Piety Street Recording in New Orleans and Morning View Studio in Malibu, California, occurring between October and December 2002.

Anthem received generally favorable reviews from critics, some of whom noted the shift away from horns into pop-punk, while others commented on Cavallo's production. It reached number 45 on the Billboard 200 in the United States. "The Science of Selling Yourself Short" peaked at number 36 on the US Alternative Airplay chart. Preceded by a headlining US tour, "She's Gonna Break Soon" was released as the album's lead single in April 2003. The band then appeared on the Honda Civic Tour, went on a European tour and then spent three months as part of the Warped Tour. "The Science of Selling Yourself Short" was released as the album's second single in July 2003. Outtakes from the sessions were released as the compilation album B Is for B-Sides (2004).

== Background ==
Less Than Jake released their fourth studio album Borders & Boundaries in October 2000, through Fat Wreck Chords. It was promoted with a supporting slot for Bon Jovi on their arena tour of the United States, a headlining tour of Japan, and a stint with MxPx in Europe. By August 2001, Less Than Jake were expecting to release a new album in early 2002, which saxophonist Peter "JR" Wasilewski anticipated to be faster and punk rock-orientated. By December 2001, the band had spent two months writing new material at a practice space in Gainesville, Florida. This space was dubbed Fort Hooker; after they had written some songs here, they would move to bassist Roger Lima's home studio, known as The Moat House, where they would record demos and write more material.

In February and March 2002, the band headlined a few shows in Florida, before touring with Bad Religion and Hot Water Music. Around this time, the band said they had 17 new songs, 10 of which had been demoed. In July 2002, vocalist and guitarist Chris DeMakes said the band's next album would be released through Warner Bros. Records. The band explained that Craig Aaronson, who had worked with the band previously at Capitol Records, had started working at Warner Bros, and set up a meeting between them and the president of Warner. In August, the band toured with Sugarcult; trombonist Buddy Schaub suffered a wrist injury, and was temporarily replaced by Vinny Nobile of the Pilfers.

== Production ==
In September 2002, Less Than Jake met with Rob Cavallo, who produced a few Green Day albums that they liked; the band chose him to produce their next album. They presented Cavallo with 40 songs they had written for the album, which he whittled down to a smaller section that the band would record. Recording took place between October and December 2002 with Cavallo as producer. They did pre-production in Los Angeles, California for a few weeks from October 2002, showing Cavallo the material they had. After the run-through, they drafted up a list of songs that wished to record, totalling 19. Several of these, such as "Short Fuse Burning" and "Plastic Cup Politics", had been performed live in the preceding months. On October 22, 2002, they flew from Los Angeles to New Orleans; they had wanted to go Nashville, Tennessee instead "because we wanted to stay in the south", until Cavallo suggested New Orleans. The members had proposed New Orleans while at one of their practices, but had disregarded this situation due to the "dangers of alcohol being served virtually 24 hours a day".

Sessions were held at Piety Street Recording in New Orleans, where the band recorded drums and bass guitar. Their main motivation for recording in New Orleans was partially due to the recording budget they had, and Cavallo's interest in a restaurant in the area. Sessions then moved in early November 2002 to Morning View Studio, which was located in a large house, in Malibu, California. The band had a week's worth of spare time before they were scheduled to work on the 19 songs they started at New Orleans. They decided to record several tracks that did not get recorded previously, including one new song from Lima that he wrote at the studio. The band briefly worked with Pat Benatar for a track that did not pan out. They re-recorded one of their older songs, "Look What Happened", during these sessions as they were unhappy with how it sounded and also at the suggestion of Cavallo. They ended up recording around 30 songs in various stages of completion. Recording continued into late December 2002 with guitars and vocal parts. Doug MacKean served as the main engineer, with assistance from engineers Erik Flettrich and Wesley Fontenot; Tom Lord-Alge mixed the recordings in Malibu with Cavallo, Fiorello and guitarist Chris DeMakes in attendance in January 2003.

== Composition ==
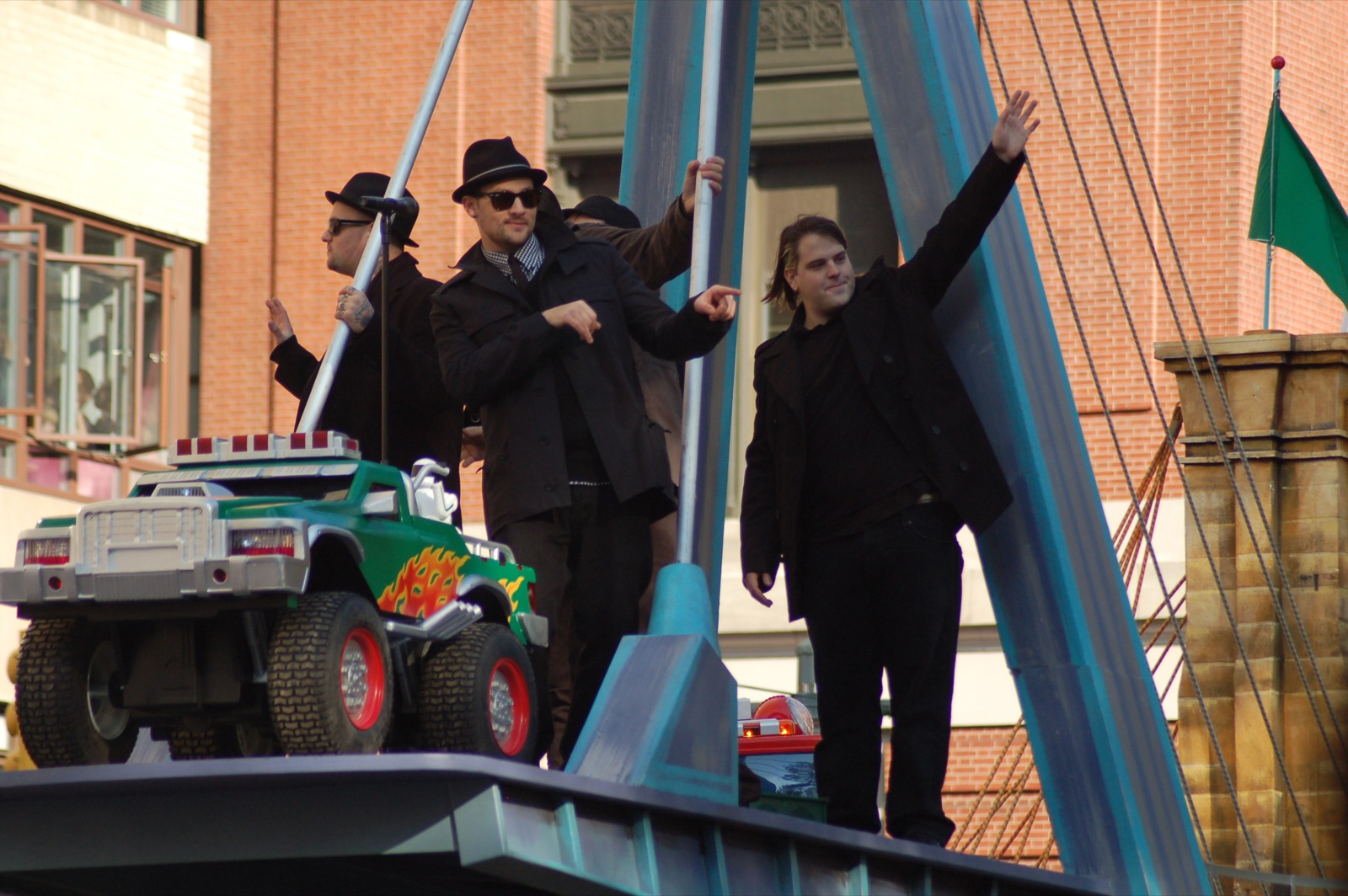
Critics compared the pop-punk sound of Anthem to the work of Good Charlotte (pictured in 2007).

Musically, the sound of Anthem has been described as pop-punk, pop rock and ska punk, drawing comparison to the work of Good Charlotte. Several critics noted a decrease in the use of horns throughout the album. Session musicians Luis Conte and Jamie Muhoberac contributed percussion and keyboards respectively to the recordings. Fiorello explained that the title was down to the album's lyrics: "They are anthem-y [...], but they're dark. It's supposed to be like the light at the end of the tunnel." Anthem opens with the punk rock song "Welcome to the New South", and is followed by the emo pop-influenced "The Ghosts of Me and You", which evokes Blink-182 and the Get Up Kids. Discussing the latter song, drummer Vinnie Fiorello said: "[T]here are ghosts in your town that haunt you [...] it's haunted with places and people from the past." "Look What Happened" was originally recorded for Borders & Boundaries; the band toned down the ska elements and leaned towards punk rock. Fiorello said they altered the intro of "Look What Happened", making the track "sound more complete and powerful." The track features vocal parts from Heather Tabor, the frontwoman of Teen Idols. "The Science of Selling Yourself Short" is a mid-tempo ska and reggae song that DeMakes said was about the "science of just doing all the stuff bad to yourself that you shouldn't be doing". It is an ode to people viewed as underachievers and slackers. DeMakes said Lima had the main guitar riff for it for a long period of time, which was later combined with a chorus section that DeMakes wrote while in Los Angeles. It was the slowest song the band had done since "Dopeman" from their second studio album, Losing Streak (1996).

"Short Fuse Burning" uses a guitar part reminiscent of the one heard in "Thunderstruck" (1990) by AC/DC, backed by a melodic hardcore rhythm section. "Motown Never Sounded So Good" is a Barenaked Ladies-indebted indie-funk song. "The Upwards War and the Down Turned Cycle" sees the band tackle the negatives of minimum wage. "Escape from the A-Bomb House" showcases an influence from the works of Bad Religion and Hot Water Music. DeMakes wrote the darker-sounding music after he had seen the lyrics for it. "Best Wishes to Your Black Lung" revisited the third-wave ska sound of the band's earlier releases; its title referred to former member Peter Anna, who smoked and left to work as a firefighter. "She's Gonna Break Soon" details Fiorello's friend, who was content with her high school life, until she became an outsider when moving to college. The album closes with the two-part song "The Brightest Bulb Has Burned Out/Screws Fall Out"; "The Brightest Bulb Has Burned Out" section is a sparsely arranged song that leads into "Screws Fall Out", one of the loudest rock sections in the band's catalogue. The song overall was about a friend of Fiorello's, who overdosed when the band were making Borders & Boundaries. The bonus track "Surrender" is a cover of the 1978 Cheap Trick song of the same name; Less Than Jake's version is a rock track in the style of the Ramones.

== Release ==
After mixing concluded, the band shot a music video for "She's Gonna Break Soon". It was directed by The Malloys, and stars Alexis Bledel, known for her work on Gilmore Girls. On March 7, 2003, Anthem was announced for release in two months' time; alongside this, its track listing was posted online. On March 20, 2003, the "She's Gonna Break Soon" video was posted online. A radio edit of "She's Gonna Break Soon" without horns was released as a single on April 15. DeMakes explained that they had been making remixes both with and without horns and ska parts since 1996: "Does that compromise your work, this and that? [...] You don't want horns in the song? Great - it's still the same fucking lyrics, it's still the same song, and when we play it live we have a horn section". The CD version included "A.S.A.O.K." and an alternative version of "The Brightest Bulb Has Burned Out" as the B-sides. On May 9, "Short Fuse Burning" was posted online, followed by Anthem being made available for streaming three days later. The album was initially planned for release in April 2003, before it was eventually released on May 20, through Sire Records, an imprint of Warner Bros. The artwork was compiled by Fiorello, who commissioned illustrators and cartoonists to create artwork for each song in the album's booklet. He had been sending lyrics to artists over the course of a year and they would send him their interpretations via artwork.

"The Science of Selling Yourself Short" was released as the album's second single on July 1, 2003, and released to radio a week later. The CD version included "Sobriety Is a Serious Business and Business Isn't So Good", and a live version of "The Ghosts of Me and You". An animated music video for "The Science of Selling Yourself Short", done by Chip Wass, who also made the album's artwork, was posted online on August 4. On August 19, 2003, versions of "The Ghosts of Me and You" and "Welcome to the New South" appeared on the live EP Live from the Santa Monica Store. Two days later, a second music video was released for "The Science of Selling Yourself Short" on the band's website. While on tour with Fall Out Boy, an EP featuring rare recording's from each act was available on the tour. In July 2004, several outtakes from Anthem sessions were released as the compilation album B Is for B-Sides. The band had to re-record some of them as they were left unfinished during the making of the album. An alternative version of "The Brightest Bulb Has Burned Out" featuring Billy Bragg was included on the Rock Against Bush (2004) compilation. A remixed version of B Is for B-Sides was released in 2005, through Fueled by Ramen.

== Touring ==
In March and April 2003, Less Than Jake toured across the US with Teen Idols, Punchline and Bigwig. Later in April, the group supported Good Charlotte and New Found Glory on the Honda Civic Tour. Following this, the band embarked on a headlining tour of mainland Europe; it was initially planned to occur in March 2003, but was moved to April to allow the band to play more shows in that territory. The band toured across the UK throughout May 2003, with support from Pietasters. From June to August 2003, Less Than Jake went on Warped Tour. For the rest of August, the band went on a short tour of Europe, which included appearances at the Reading and Leeds Festivals. They played a few US shows in early September, before touring New Zealand, Australia, and Japan, which lasted into October.

In November and December, the band went on a US tour with Fall Out Boy; the first half also featured Yellowcard. Before the tour began, Rufio was scheduled to appear, though they had to drop off due to an issue in the family. They were replaced by Bang Tango and Tommy Tutone; as Schaub was still suffering from his wrist problem, Chris Rhodes of the Mighty Mighty Bosstones filled in. In April and May 2004, the band went on a short of North America with the Early November, Fall Out Boy and the Academy Is..., which included an appearance at the Skate and Surf Festival. Following this, the band toured Europe in May 2004, with Yellowcard and the A.K.A.s. They played a few shows with the Academy Is... before touring the US as part of Projekt Revolution between July and September 2004.

== Reception ==
Professional ratings
Aggregate scores
Source	Rating
Metacritic	71/100
Review scores
Source	Rating
AllMusic	4/5 stars
Alternative Press	4/5 stars
Blender	2/5 stars
Gigwise	3/5 stars
Playlouder	3/5 stars
Punknews.org	4/5 stars
Q	3.5/5 stars
Rolling Stone	3/5 stars

Anthem was met with generally favourable reviews from music critics. At Metacritic, which assigns a normalized rating out of 100 to reviews from mainstream publications, the album received an average score of 71, based on 8 reviews.

AllMusic reviewer Johnny Loftus wrote that Anthem was a "hooky, heady collection of heartfelt postcards from the future that LTJ's youthful fan base has to look forward to". He noted that the "crunchy major chords and soaring choruses have a tendency to crowd out the band's ska influences and relegate its horn section to support status". CMJ New Music Report writer Brad Maybe said the band "pulled back a little on the horns, and it may not be as loud and boisterous as it once was on record, but LTJ still has a pumping brass section". Punknews.org staff writer Adam White theorised that the "lack of 'in your face' horns seems to have less to do with label politics than it does with careful songwriting. The brass is used, effectively I may add, when they are needed".

Will Williams of Gigwise wrote that the album "may not represent much of a step forward, but it is a step forward nonetheless, and should be more than a pleasant surprise for their fanbase". In a review for Playlouder, journalist John Robb wrote that the album "leans closer towards a chuggy pop punk attack, it's like a thicker, dirtier Good Charlotte and comes complete with indentikit stomp-along choruses, fired by a high energy rush". Chart Attack's Andy Lee said the album "all but destroys Less Than Jake's ska-influenced sound in favour of sounding like every other pop-punk band in existence". Dan Cohen of Exclaim! countered this, saying the band "still has a knack for writing songs with catchy choruses [...] so the album isn't a disappointment and there isn't a weak song on it".

Blender writer Matt Diehl said Cavallo was the "real star here", but the band's "stylistic attention-deficit disorder dilutes the focus and also dates it". Loftus acknowledged that long term fans of the band might "declare it to be a volley lobbed at mainstream acceptance. These naysayers have a point, as the presence of Cavallo's Midas touch proves". Rolling Stone writer Jon Caramanica called the album a "precision-produced guided missile seeking the hearts of socially awkward skate punks everywhere".

Anthem peaked at number 45 on the US Billboard 200 chart. "The Science of Selling Yourself Short" charted at number 36 on the US Alternative Airplay chart. BuzzFeed included the album on their list of the best pop-punk albums. Tom Weaver of Casey has expressed admiration for the album.

== Track listing ==
Track listing per booklet.

Anthem standard track listing
No.	Title	Lead vocals	Length
1.	"Welcome to the New South"	DeMakes	2:46
2.	"The Ghosts of Me and You"	Lima	3:21
3.	"Look What Happened"	DeMakes; Lima	3:06
4.	"The Science of Selling Yourself Short"	Lima; DeMakes	3:06
5.	"Short Fuse Burning"	DeMakes	2:19
6.	"Motown Never Sounded So Good"	Lima	2:36
7.	"The Upwards War and the Down Turned Cycle"	DeMakes	2:58
8.	"Escape from the A-Bomb House"	DeMakes	3:31
9.	"Best Wishes to Your Black Lung"	Lima; DeMakes	2:54
10.	"She's Gonna Break Soon"	DeMakes	3:14
11.	"That's Why They Call It a Union"	DeMakes	3:03
12.	"Plastic Cup Politics"	Lima	2:17
13.	"The Brightest Bulb Has Burned Out/Screws Fall Out"	DeMakes	4:44

Bonus track
No.	Title	Lead vocals	Length
14.	"Surrender" (Cheap Trick cover)	DeMakes	3:41
Total length:			43:43

== Personnel ==
Personnel per booklet.

Less Than Jake

- Chris DeMakes – vocals, guitars
- Roger Lima – vocals, bass
- Vinnie Fiorello – drums
- Buddy Schaub – trombone
- Peter "JR" Wasilewski – saxophone

Additional musicians

- Luis Conte – percussion
- Jamie Muhoberac – additional keyboards
- Heather Tabor – backing vocals (track 3)

Production

- Rob Cavallo – producer
- Tom Lord-Alge – mixing
- Doug McKean – engineer, Pro Tools
- Erik Flettrich – assistant engineer
- Wesley Fontenot – assistant engineer

Artwork

- Jeff Soto – "Welcome to the New South" illustration
- Steve Vance – "The Ghosts of Me and You" illustration
- Wendy Ann Gardner – "Look What Happened" illustration
- Chip Wass – "The Science of Selling Yourself Short" illustration
- Florenzio Zavala – "Short Fuse Burning" illustration
- Kurt Halsey Fredericksen – "Motown Never Sounded So Good" illustration
- Shepard Fairey – "The Upwards War and the Down Turned Cycle" illustration
- David Choe – "Escape From the A-Bomb House" illustration
- Alison Zawacki – "Best Wishes to Your Black Lung" illustration
- Mitch O'Connell – "She's Gonna Break Soon" illustration
- Peter Wonsowski – "That's Why They Call It a Union" illustration
- Scott Sinclair – "Plastic Cup Politics" illustration
- Camille Rose Garcia – "The Brightest Bulb Has Burned Out" illustration
- Speed Scott Hall – "Screws Fall Out" illustration
- Jason Miracle – additional illustrations
- Shawn Hall – additional illustrations
- Vinnie Dougan – art direction, CD package concept
- Wendy Dougan – art direction, design, CD enhancement
- Stephanie Allen – cover art concept
- Erik Davison – cover tweaking
- Robert Sebree – photograph
- Jon Masciana – CD enhancement

== Charts ==
2003 chart performance for Anthem
Chart (2003)	Peak position
Canadian Albums (Nielsen SoundScan)	56
Scottish Albums (OCC)	38
UK Albums (OCC)	37
US Billboard 200	45

2021 chart performance for Anthem
Chart (2021)	Peak position
UK Independent Albums (OCC)	43
UK Rock & Metal Albums (OCC)	23

== See also ==
- Cheer Up! – album by contemporaries Reel Big Fish that similarly saw the reduction of ska elements
