= TV/EP =

EP by Less Than Jake
- Released: October 12, 2010
- Recorded: 2010
- Genres: Ska punk; punk rock; pop punk
- Length: 11:30
- Language: English
- Label: Sleep It Off
- Producer: Less Than Jake

Less Than Jake chronology
GNV FLA (2008)	TV/EP (2010)	Greetings from Less Than Jake (2011)

TV/EP is an EP by Less Than Jake. Apart from re-masters of their earlier albums, this EP is the second Less Than Jake release to be distributed by their own label, Sleep It Off Records, following 2008's full-length album GNV FLA. The recording consists of covers of TV theme songs and product jingles.

The album was released as a CD and digital download on October 12, 2010. A few weeks prior to the release date, a video of the band's version of the Animaniacs theme song was released on their official website as a teaser to EP. Each song is tracklisted on the album, not by the title of the actual song being covered, but by a succession of tracks titled "Channel 1", "Channel 2", etc. "Channel 4" contains a reference to the song "Weinershnitzel" by the Descendents.

== Reception ==
The TV/EP received generally mixed to positive reviews from critics, many of which note the EP's positive feeling but its limited appeal. James Greene Jr. of Crawdaddy.com said that "[the] TV/EP will surely appease the band’s legions of rabid fans and anyone who likes a good 15-minute chunk of novelty music." TheyWillRockYou.com gave the album 4-out-of-5 stars and concluded that it is a "fun throwaway album from a great band" but that its "lasting value... is debatable." Likewise, Allmusic.com called the record "fast and fun," with a "cool idea" but ultimately "too disjointed to be anything more than a one-listen novelty."

== Track listing ==
No.	Title	Length
1.	"Channel 1" ("Leave It All to Me", the theme song to iCarly)	1:12
2.	"Channel 2" (Hungry Hungry Hippos jingle)	0:30
3.	"Channel 3" (Theme song to Animaniacs)	1:05
4.	"Channel 4" (McDonald's' jingle for the Big Mac)	0:23
5.	"Channel 5" (Theme song to Diff'rent Strokes)	0:54
6.	"Channel 6" ("Boss of Me", the theme song to Malcolm in the Middle)	0:40
7.	"Channel 7" (General Mills' Pac-Man breakfast cereal jingle)	0:33
8.	"Channel 8" (Theme song to Scooby-Doo, Where Are You!)	0:55
9.	"Channel 9" (Kit Kat jingle)	0:11
10.	"Channel 10" (Theme song to SpongeBob SquarePants)	0:43
11.	"Channel 11" ("In The Street", the theme song to That '70s Show)	0:53
12.	"Channel 12" (Oscar Mayer Weiners jingle)	0:30
13.	"Channel 13" ("Love and Marriage", the theme of Married... with Children)	0:46
14.	"Channel 14" (Toys "R" Us jingle)	0:28
15.	"Channel 15" ("Making Our Dreams Come True", the theme from Laverne & Shirley)	1:15
16.	"Channel 16" (FreeCreditReport.com Pirate-themed restaurant jingle)	0:33
Total length:		11:30
