= Pezcore =

Studio album by Less Than Jake
- Released: August 22, 1995
- Studios: Georgia Street, Tallahassee, FL; Mirror Image, Gainesville, FL
- Genre: Ska punk
- Length: 49:36
- Label: Dill
- Producer: Bob McPeek

Less Than Jake chronology
Making Fun of Things You Don't Understand (1995)	Pezcore (1995)	Losing Streak (1996)

Professional ratings
Review scores
Source	Rating
AllMusic	4.5/5 stars
Punknews.org	4.5/5 stars

Pezcore is the debut full-length album released by the American ska punk band Less Than Jake, released on August 22, 1995, through Dill Records.

== Release and legacy ==
It was originally released on Dill Records in 1995 on CD and cassette.

The album reissued on Asian Man in 1996 on CD only, but was missing two tracks found on the Dill version ("Jeffersons" and "Laverne and Shirley").

In October 2002, Less Than Jake released a tenth anniversary version of Pezcore to celebrate the band's 10 years of existence. Issued on Less Than Jake drummer Vinnie Fiorello's Fueled by Ramen label, the recordings were remixed and remastered.

The band announced on January 5, 2008 that another reissue of Pezcore would be released on the band's label, Sleep It Off Records. The record was re-released on March 18, 2008 accompanied with a live DVD.

== Track listing ==
1. "Liquor Store" – 2:44
2. "My Very Own Flag" – 2:47
3. "Johnny Quest Thinks We're Sellouts" – 2:55
4. "Big" – 3:04
5. "Shotgun" – 2:56
6. "Black Coffee" – 2:24
7. "Throw the Brick" – 2:10
8. "Growing Up on a Couch" – 2:30
9. "Blindsided" – 2:50
10. "Downbeat" – 2:10
11. "Jen Doesn't Like Me Anymore" – 2:55
12. "Out of the Crowd" – 2:31
13. "Robo" – 1:33
14. "Where in the Hell is Mike Sinkovich?" – 2:13
15. "Process" – 2:39
16. "3 Quarts Drunk" – 2:05
17. "Boomtown" – 2:45
18. "Short on Ideas" – 1:47
19. "One Last Cigarette" – 4:38
  - One Last Cigarette ends at 2:28. An untitled hidden track begins at 3:46.
20. "Jeffersons" (Dill release only)
21. "Laverne & Shirley" (Dill and Japan release only, Hidden Track on Asian Man release)
22. "Soundcheck" (Japan release only)
23. "Time and a Half on 2nd Ave and 6th Street" (Japan release only)

=== Tenth Anniversary Edition ===
1. "Liquor Store" – 2:44
2. "My Very Own Flag" – 2:47
3. "Johnny Quest Thinks We're Sellouts" – 2:55
4. "Big" – 3:04
5. "Shotgun" – 2:56
6. "Black Coffee" – 2:24
7. "Throw the Brick" – 2:10
8. "Growing Up on a Couch" – 2:30
9. "Blindsided" – 2:50
10. "Downbeat" – 2:10
11. "Jen Doesn't Like Me Anymore" – 2:55
12. "Out of the Crowd" – 2:31
13. "Robo" – 1:33
14. "Where in the Hell is Mike Sinkovich?" – 2:13
15. "Process" – 2:39
16. "Three Quarts Drunk" – 2:05
17. "Boomtown" – 2:34
18. "Short on Ideas/One Last Cigarette" – 4:17

== Song information ==
- "Liquor Store" originally appeared on Better Class Of Losers CS (rerecorded) as well as Songs About Drinking
- The story behind "Johnny Quest Thinks We're Sellouts": "Ha. Well, he's a friend of mine I've known since elementary school. He's an architect student at the University of Florida, in Gainesville, Florida, where we're from. And we played this show in town, it was a battle of the bands and we won, and we got to play at the great opening of this record store, and this guy wrote in his work office at the Architect School, "Less Than Jake are sellouts". And as for the name Johnny Quest, that was his moniker, his nickname, he never heard us before or anything. He just wrote it just because. So we just shrugged our shoulders and decided to write a silly song about it." -Chris
- "Big" originally appeared on Better Class Of Losers CS and Making Fun of Things You Don't Understand 10"
- "Shotgun" originally appeared on Better Class Of Losers CS and Making Fun Of Things You Don't Understand 10" (rerecorded)
- "Black Coffee" originally appeared on Unglued 7". It was also one of the original Less Than Jake demos.
- "Throw The Brick" was written in the studio while recording Pezcore
- "Growing up on a Couch" has been frequently known as "Smoking Pot on a Couch", surfacing from a bootleg recording of a 1998 show in Atlanta, GA, when Chris introduced the song as the incorrect name
- "Downbeat" originally appeared on Making Fun Of Things You Don't Understand 10"
- "Jen Doesn't Like Me Anymore" originally appeared on Six Pack To Go Comp CD. The story behind Jen; "I wrote this one about a girl that liked Chris. Her wacky attributes: a father who had a photo album of pictures of people in the bathroom (he'd kick in the door and take a picture while they were taking a shit or whatever), her having sex with her cousin, and eating all my Ramen and Kool-Aid. " -Vinnie
- "Where the Hell is Mike Sinkovich?" originally appeared on Pez Kings 7" (rerecorded. The story behind Mike Sinkovich: "Well, I'm 16 years old on a rooftop overlooking Jersey city. My friend Mike says things aren't going well with his life and our conversation lasts 5–6 hours. The next day he runs away from home to NYC never to be heard from again" – Vinnie
- "Process" originally appeared on Six Pack To Go Comp CD. It was also one of the original Less Than Jake demos.
- The "Liquor Store" where the band used to get "Three Quarts Drunk" is portrayed in the "Gainesville Rock City" music video.
- Intro to "Boomtown" removed on the 2002 rerelease

Quotes: http://www.waste.org/~ltj/FAQ.html
