= Less Than Jake =

American punk band

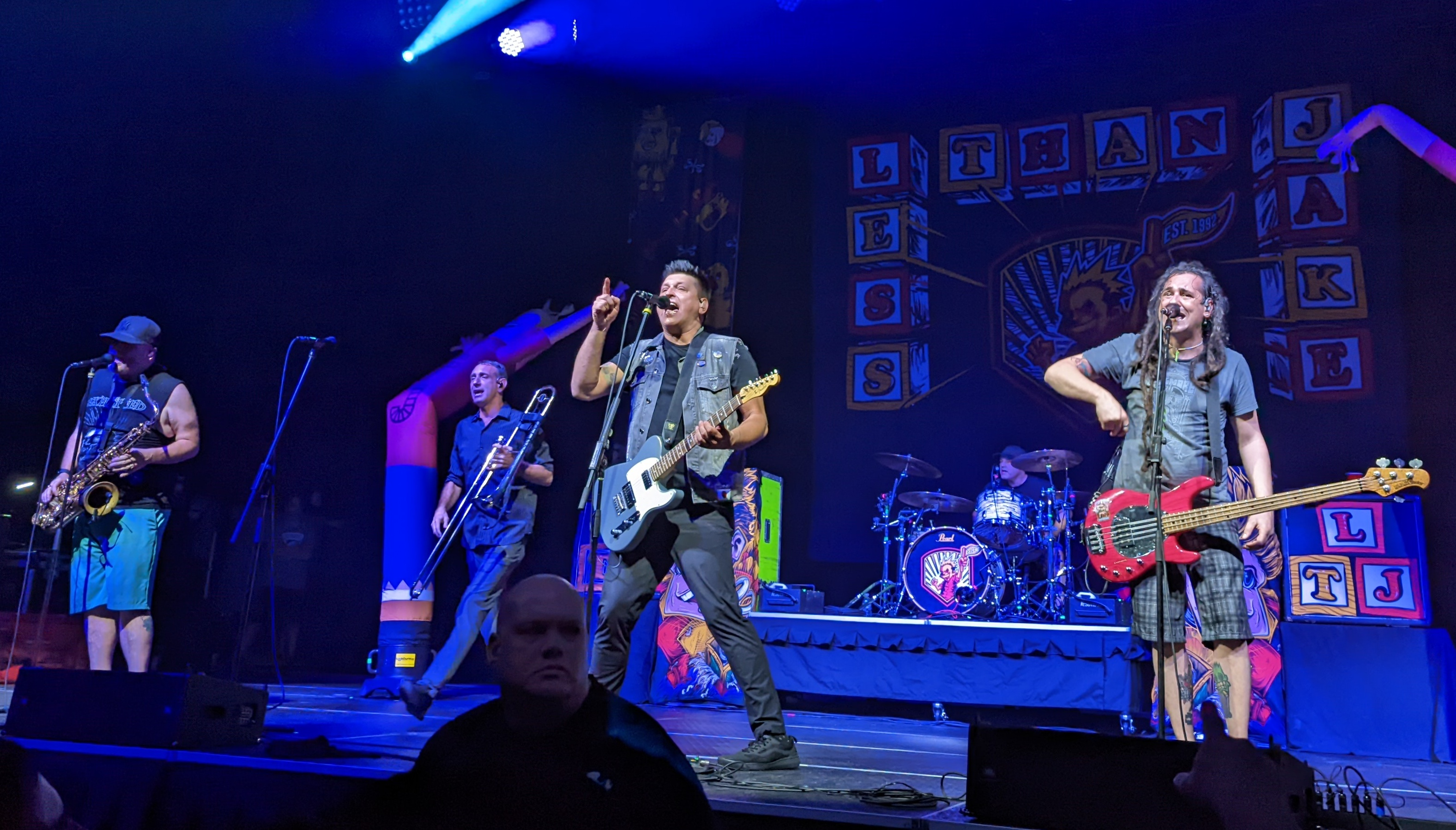
- Less Than Jake performing in 2022. From left to right: J.R. Wasilewski, Buddy Schaub, Chris DeMakes, Matt Yonker, Roger Lima.

Background information
- Also known as: LTJ
- Origin: Gainesville, Florida, U.S.
- Genres: Ska punk; pop-punk; punk rock; skate punk
- Works: Less Than Jake discography
- Years active: 1992–present
- Labels: Dill; Asian Man; No Idea; Fat Wreck Chords; Capitol; Fueled by Ramen; Sire; Sleep It Off; Cooking Vinyl; Pure Noise
- Members: Chris DeMakes; Roger Lima; Buddy "Goldfinger" Schaub; Peter "JR" Wasilewski; Matt Yonker
- Past members: Vinnie Fiorello; Shaun Grief; Jessica Mills; Derron Nuhfer; Lars "Slim" Nylander; Peter "Pete" Anna
- Website: lessthanjake.com

Less Than Jake is an American ska punk band from Gainesville, Florida, formed in 1992. The band consists of Chris DeMakes (guitars, vocals), Roger Lima (bass, vocals), Buddy Schaub (trombone), Peter "JR" Wasilewski (saxophone) and Matt Yonker (drums).

The group released its debut album, Pezcore, in 1995, following a series of independent seven-inch single releases. The band's subsequent two studio albums, Losing Streak (1996) and Hello Rockview (1998), were released on a major label, Capitol Records, leading to increased exposure. The band's fourth album, Borders and Boundaries, was released in 2000 on Fat Wreck Chords. The band's fifth studio album, Anthem (2003), was the group's most commercially successful to date, featuring the singles "She's Gonna Break Soon" and "The Science of Selling Yourself Short".

In 2008, the band founded its own label, Sleep It Off Records, and released its seventh full-length album, GNV FLA. The band then stated its preference for EP releases, and independently issued Greetings from Less Than Jake (2011) and its counterpart, Seasons Greetings from Less Than Jake (2012). In late 2012, the band combined the two to create the compilation album Greetings and Salutations (2012). The band's eighth studio album, See the Light, was released on November 12, 2013.

In February 2017, the band released Sound the Alarm, an EP which became their final release with founding member, drummer and lyricist Vinnie Fiorello, who departed from the band the following year. Fiorello was replaced by former Teen Idols drummer Matt Yonker, who contributed to the band's ninth studio album, Silver Linings (2020). A seven-song EP, Uncharted, was released in November 2024 and produced by Bill Stevenson of Descendents and Black Flag.

The band's style combines ska, punk rock and power pop. They are known for their humor and fondness of Pez candy.

== History ==
=== Formation and Pezcore (1992–1995) ===
Before the formation of Less Than Jake, vocalist and guitarist Chris DeMakes, drummer Vinnie Fiorello, and bassist Shaun Grief led a local band named Good Grief while attending high school in Port Charlotte, Florida. Good Grief broke up when DeMakes moved north to attend the University of Florida. On July 13, 1992, Less Than Jake was born. While Grief moved to New York City (he would later return as the band's roadie), DeMakes and Fiorello began writing songs on the weekends before Fiorello would join DeMakes at the University of Florida. When united, the pair decided they needed a bass player, but first they wanted a name. Fiorello said:

We decided before we tried to get a bass player we'd zero in on a name for the "band" — to either (A) — make it seem like we had our shit together or (B) — make ourselves feel better. I think it was (B) or maybe it was just so I could write it over and over again on notebook paper during my anthropology class.

Band members have told various media outlets different versions of the origin of the band's name. DeMakes has stated in interviews that the band's name came from Fiorello's family's pet parrot. His story claimed that the parrot would squawk during the band's practice sessions, leading to Fiorello's mother telling the band that they needed to stop playing because they were disturbing the bird. This would lead to the band referring to themselves as being "less than Jake". In June 2020, however, Fiorello clarified that Jake was not a parrot but was, in fact, an English Bulldog. After practicing with a different bass player for a couple of weeks, the band met Roger Lima, a guitarist who also attended the University of Florida. After Lima practiced with the band on guitar for a few hours, the band fired the current bass player and recruited him instead. Citing influence from Snuff, the band decided it wanted to add a horn section.

In 1993, the group added its first horn player, Jessica Mills, and released its first 7-inch record, Smoke Spot, with the band members hand pressing all 300 records themselves. Soon after, trombone player Buddy Schaub joined the band. Over the first few years, the band put out its first EP, Better Class Of Losers, made compilation appearances, and released several vinyl records (featuring songs that would later appear on the 1995 Losers, Kings, and Things We Don't Understand compilation), before Mike Park agreed to release the band's debut album on Dill Records. Right before the band's first U.S. tour in June 1995 with Skankin' Pickle, Schaub had already made plans to travel to Europe with his friends. The band found a temporary replacement in saxophonist Derron Nuhfer, who filled in for Schaub during his absence. Derron became a permanent member in August 1995.

Less Than Jake's first full-length LP Pezcore debuted in August 1995, featuring such staples as "Liquor Store" and "My Very Own Flag". Originally on Dill Records, the CD contained 21 tracks, including two covers of the TV theme songs for Jeffersons and Laverne and Shirley (which were omitted on the subsequent reissues on Asian Man and Fueled By Ramen records). The title of the album stems from Roger and Vinnie's unexplained fondness for Pez candy, clearly apparent in their reportedly sizable Pez dispenser collections, and the pervasively used suffix "core". Ever since, Pez dispenser motifs have been a common feature of Less Than Jake's merchandise.

=== Losing Streak and Hello Rockview (1996–1999) ===
Shortly following the release of Pezcore, the band was signed to Capitol Records. The group debuted on the label in 1996 with Losing Streak, containing ska-punk songs. Following the 1997 Warped Tour, saxophonist Jessica Mills left the band to perform with Citizen Fish. Mills was replaced by ex-Slapstick trombonist Pete Anna in January 1998 (trombonist Lars Nylander served as a fill-in during the fall of 1997). Around this time, Vinnie Fiorello also started his own record label, Fueled by Ramen, with friend John Janick. During 1997 the band embarked on the Caffeine Nation Tour with the Descendents, Guttermouth, and Handsome; the Race Around Uranus Tour with Blink-182 and Frenzal Rhomb; and the Warped Tour.

In 1998, after participating in the Ska Against Racism Tour with such ska acts as the Toasters and Mustard Plug, and the Warped Tour, the band released Hello Rockview. The band spawned a minor college radio hit with "History of a Boring Town", which reached No. 39 on the Billboard Modern Rock Tracks, despite not being released as a video single.

=== Borders and Boundaries (2000–2002) ===
After recording what would be Borders & Boundaries, the band opted to buy out its contract from the major label and release the album on Fat Wreck Chords instead.

In October 2000, the band released Borders & Boundaries, and landed the opening spot on Bon Jovi's North American tour. While it was not as commercially successful as previous releases initially, the album contained singles "Look What Happened" (which received minor airplay on college stations) and the group's home-town anthem, "Gainesville Rock City" (which received some airtime on MTV2). Shortly after the album's recording, Derron Nuhfer left the band (going on to join Gunmoll and later Escape Grace), and Less Than Jake found a replacement in former Spring Heeled Jack saxophonist, Pete Wasilewski. To avoid the confusion of having two Petes within the band, Pete Wasilewski was nicknamed JR (as in "Peter Junior"). In 2001 the band took part in the Vans Warped Tour, after which the first Pete departed. That year, the band toured the US along with New Found Glory, Anti-Flag, and the Teen Idols.

In 2002, Less Than Jake spent time touring with Bad Religion and Hot Water Music while spending most of the summer touring in Europe. Less Than Jake re-released its compilation album, Goodbye Blue and White, which included various 7-inch releases spanning from 1996 to 2001, and provided a different track listing from the first pressing. The album was named in honor of the group's original tour van, with the liner notes having the band recounting memories of the van. To celebrate the band's 10th anniversary, Pezcore was re-released and the band's first four 7-inch releases, Smoke Spot, Pez Kings, Unglued, and Rock-n-Roll Pizzeria, were repressed and included in a limited edition Cereal Box (which also featured a T-shirt, bobblehead, and pin).

Less Than Jake performs at The House of Blues in Las Vegas, September 2004.

=== Anthem (2003–2004) ===
Less Than Jake returned to major label status with its next album, Anthem, releasing the 2003 LP on Warner Bros./Sire Records. Debuting at No. 45 on the Billboard 200 (the band's highest to date), the album featured three major singles in both the US and the UK, with "She's Gonna Break Soon" (which spent a couple weeks on Total Request Live), "The Science Of Selling Yourself Short" (which spent five weeks on the Billboard Top 40, peaking at No. 37), and "The Brightest Bulb Has Burned Out" (featuring Billy Bragg), which spent time in the UK Top 40. Actress Alexis Bledel, known for her role as Rory Gilmore on Gilmore Girls, appeared in the video for "She's Gonna Break Soon", where she played the unnamed subject of the song, an angsty teen girl who has a nervous breakdown and destroys her bedroom over the course of the song. The band spent the rest of the year promoting the new album by playing the Warped Tour and gained support from Fall Out Boy, Yellowcard, and Bang Tango during its fall 2003 tour. The band released B Is for B-sides in July 2004. The album comprised tracks that didn't make Anthem's final cut and was produced by Less Than Jake. The DVD retrospective The People's History of Less Than Jake appeared a month later, featuring both professional and bootleg recordings of the band. The band also held the opening spot on the main stage during the Projekt Revolution tour in the summer of 2004 with Linkin Park, Korn, Snoop Dogg, and The Used before taking a long break to write the group's next record.

=== In with the Out Crowd (2005–2007) ===
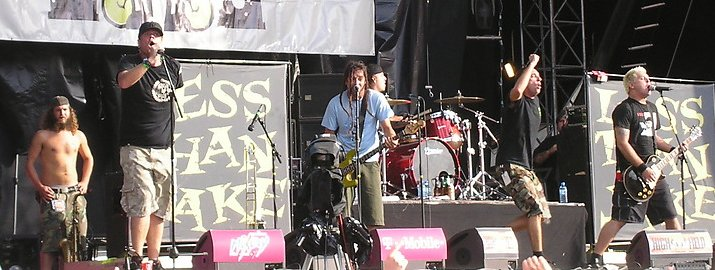
Less Than Jake performing in 2006

After spending the majority of 2005 writing and recording, the band opened 2006 by going on a full U.S. and Europe tour that also featured Catch 22, A Wilhelm Scream, The Loved Ones, The New Mexican Disaster Squad, Rock-n-Roll Soldiers, Damone, Dropkick Murphys, and Far From Finished. In April 2006, the band released its four-song Absolution for Idiots and Addicts EP, with the group's next full-length, In with the Out Crowd, following a month later on Sire Records. The album was also issued in a limited edition that came in a leather-bound case complete with bonus multimedia discs that contained music videos, bonus tracks, and an elaborate photo gallery.

In February 2007, Less Than Jake played six shows in Florida that each featured the band playing one of its albums in its entirety, plus B-sides and rarities. The band played two shows each in Jacksonville, Orlando, and St. Petersburg, to be recorded for a possible DVD release. The records performed were Borders and Boundaries, Pezcore, Losing Streak, Anthem, Hello Rockview, and In with the Out Crowd. The group then did the same in London, United Kingdom, in September 2007, playing at the Astoria II for 6 nights in a row.

On May 21, 2007, after much speculation, Vinnie Fiorello announced on his blog that the band had asked and been granted its release from its contract with Sire Records and Warner Bros. Following this split, the band released five high-quality (MP3, 320 kbit/s), DRM-free, unedited recordings of the band's live shows, taken directly from the mixing console at each show. These recordings are being released for sale on the band's website via Snocap. During the 6 Albums / 6 Shows / 6 Nights in London, Chris stated that Less Than Jake's new record label in the UK and Europe would be Cooking Vinyl.

In summer 2007, Less Than Jake embarked on the Shout It Loud Tour, co-headlining with Reel Big Fish and featuring support from Streetlight Manifesto and Against All Authority. During the shows, the band held a spoof of The Price Is Right, quizzing the contestants on various Less Than Jake "trivia", having them play a few games from the shows, using the games to determine which album the band would play selections from, and giving prizes to the winners. The band reunited with Reel Big Fish and Streetlight Manifesto for a Japan and Australia tour in December 2007.

=== GNV FLA (2008–2009) ===
On January 8, 2008, after speculation that the next Less Than Jake record could be released on Fat Wreck Chords or Victory Records, CMJ reported that the band was starting its own label, named Sleep It Off Records, the name taken from the title of a song from the B is for B-sides record. The purpose of the new label is to release the band's forthcoming album in summer 2008 and to reissue the group's back catalog. Reissues of Goodbye Blue And White, Pezcore, Losers, Kings And Things We Don't Understand, and the DVD The Peoples History Of Less Than Jake were released on March 18. The reissues include new artworks and bonus DVDs.

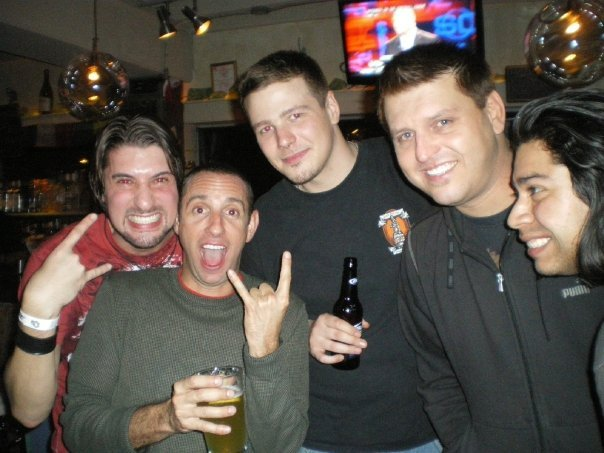
Buddy (second from left) and Chris (second from right) of Less Than Jake posing with fans in Asbury Park (November 2009).

Upon talking about the group's new album, Vinnie mentioned his desire to "combine third wave ska and pop punk in each song," hinting at a possible return to the band's older sound. He also had the following to say:

When you are in a pop punk band in your 16th year, sometimes you don't fit in the modern music industry. You need to be a shiny new penny. We didn't feel like the rest of our years as a band should fit in that narrow parameter. ... All I do know is that we're writing songs now and they seem to have the spirit of a tempo in mind, all very speedy but once we hit the record button they may be slower.

On April 20, Vinnie announced via his blog that the new album, recorded at Atlas Studios in Chicago, was totally finished. On April 23, Vinnie revealed the title of the album would be GNV FLA, the name being an abbreviation for Gainesville's airport code. Buddy Schaub stated the reason behind the album title was "to get back to our roots". The first single from GNV FLA was "Does The Lion City Still Roar?", GNV FLA was officially released June 24, 2008. Touring in support of the album included the Reading and Leeds Festivals and a tour of UK during the fall containing thirteen dates with the band Zebrahead.

"Conviction Notice" was the second and final single off the album. The group also stated at other various concerts during its recent Europe tour that the band was recording video footage for a new DVD.

In June 2009, Internet radio station PunkRadioCast teamed up with Jones Soda to create a punk pop 6 pack featuring labels designed by PunkRadioCast and five punk artists, one of which was "Less Than Jake – Root Beer".

=== EP releases and See the Light (2010–2017) ===
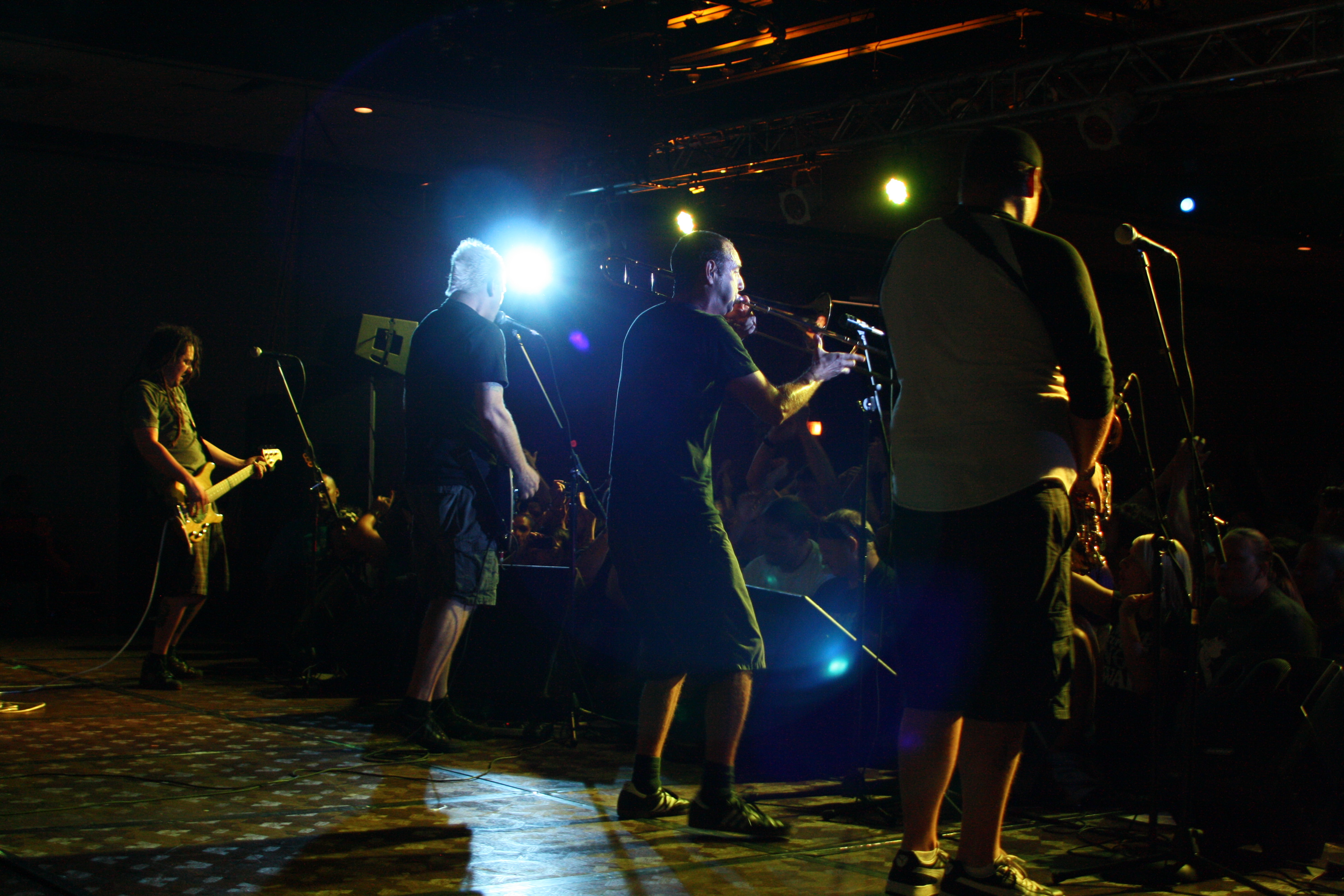
Less Than Jake performing at the 2010 Florida Supercon

On July 7, 2010, the band announced that it had started recording again. On October 12, 2010, the group released TV/EP, consisting of sixteen covers of television theme songs in the span of thirteen minutes: "Spanning from the vintage adverts of yesteryear to the frenetic promos of modern day, TV/EP reimagines a world where pop punk and ska is the music de rigueur, and this is the soundtrack to your couch potato life. Tracklisted as anonymously numbered channels, the experience they have planned is akin to the feeling of flipping random television channels." The first revealed track off the disc is a rendition of the Animaniacs theme song.

The band also performed in Tavares, Florida along with the Supervillains and local acts to support funding for the surrounding counties' high school band programs.

On June 20, 2011, the band released an EP entitled Greetings from Less Than Jake, which was made available on the group's online store and was sold on Warped Tour 2011 as well. On February 16, 2012, Less Than Jake released a follow-up EP entitled Seasons Greetings from Less Than Jake. The band announced both EPs would be re-released, with 2 previously unreleased songs, as part of a new album called Greetings and Salutations from Less Than Jake, released in October 2012 through Fat Wreck Chords, who had released Borders and Boundaries. On April 17, 2013, Less Than Jake announced through its Facebook page that the band had signed back to Fat Wreck Chords and would release its first album full of new material since 2008 sometime in the fall. On August 9, the album's title, track listing and release date were announced, and See the Light was subsequently released on November 12, 2013.

On July 29, 2016, at Vans Warped Tour 2016, Peter "JR" Wasilewski told Fuse, "We're working on a new record right now, nothing to really speak of, but it will be coming out in 2017 for sure." Less Than Jake launched a tour with Pepper in the January and February 2017 to promote their latest release, the Sound the Alarm EP. Released on February 3, 2017, by Pure Noise Records, it debuted at 114 on the Billboard 200.

=== Vinnie Fiorello's departure, Silver Linings and Uncharted (2018–present) ===
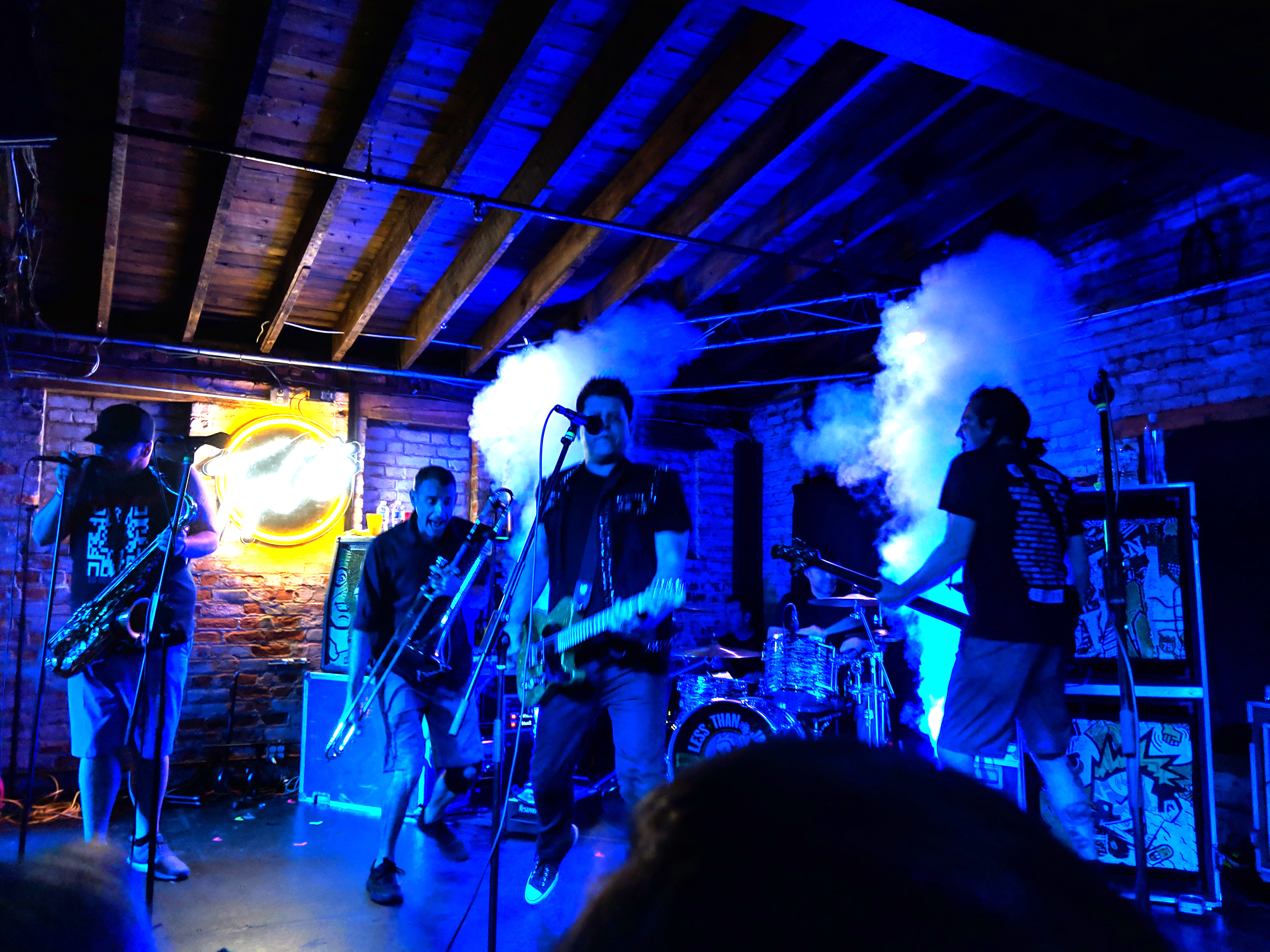
Less Than Jake performing in 2019

On October 24, 2018, Fiorello stated that, while he would remain a member of Less Than Jake, he would no longer be touring with the band. On October 26, following Fiorello's announcement, the band announced that former Teen Idols drummer Matt Yonker would be the touring drummer moving onwards. On September 1, 2019, Lima stated that Fiorello was no longer with the band in any capacity, and Yonker subsequently joined the band on a full-time basis, having worked with the band previously in a number of behind-the-scenes capacities. Roger Lima noted: "It was a fairly smooth transition having long time friend and LTJ workhorse Matt Yonker jump on the drum kit late in 2018. He had done merch, guitar tech, stage, and more recently, live sound and tour managing and management for us! So we had some restructuring to do."

In October 2020, Lima reflected on Fiorello's departure: "He was the primary lyricist for the band, and it took a bit of refocusing of creative juices as the rest of us took on that role as part of the songwriting, absolutely. Vinnie was becoming tired of life on the road and wanted to spend more time with his daughter. No bad feelings, I am just happy we got to where we got and I'm ready to pick up the torch and continue forward on this crazy path." Fiorello has since joined a new supergroup The Inevitables with other colleagues from other ska/punk bands.

In an email to fan club members, the title of their next album was announced to be Silver Linings. An official release was delayed due to COVID-19; the album was ultimately released on December 11, 2020.

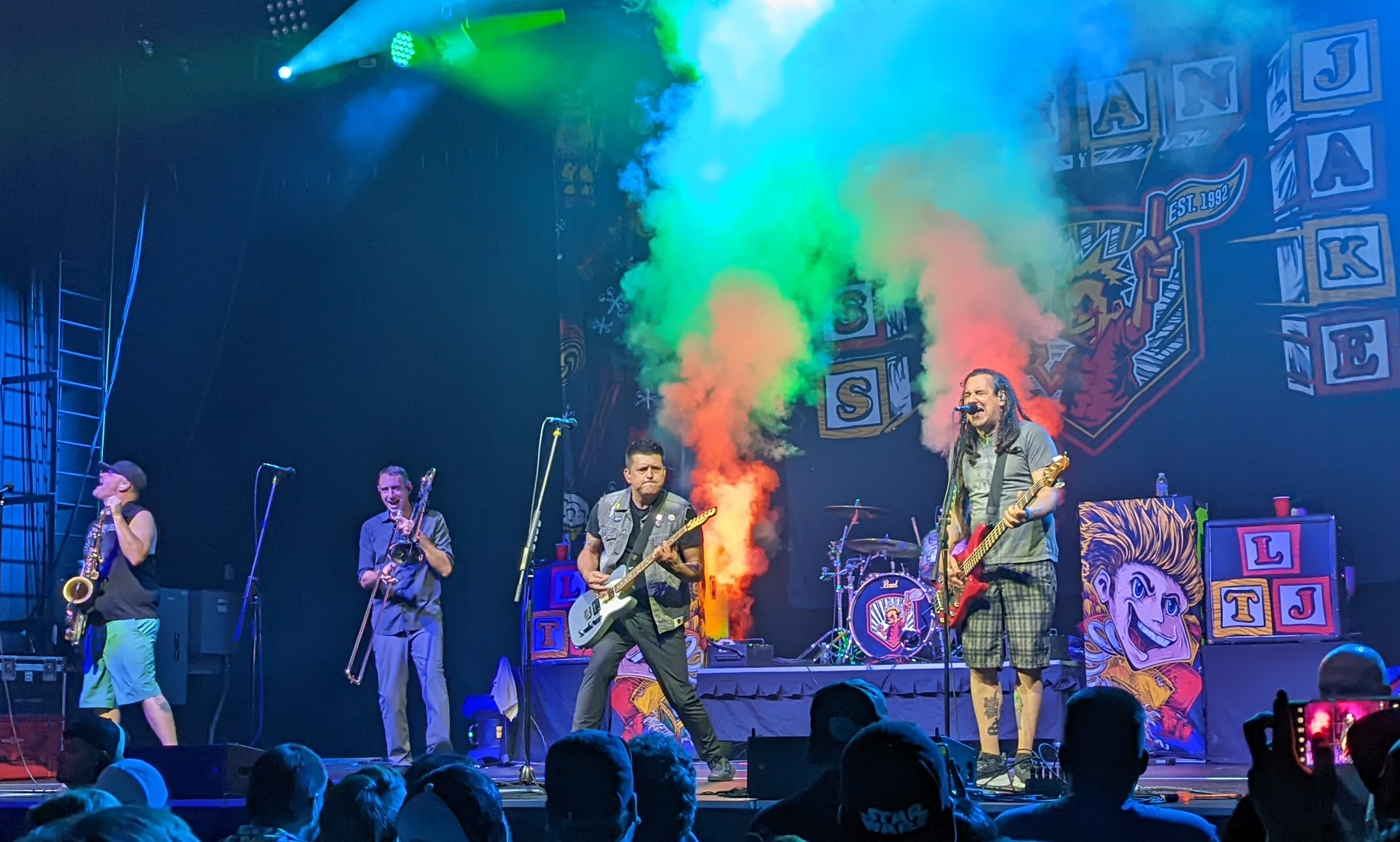
Less Than Jake performing on the Back for the Attack Tour in 2022

In 2022, Less Than Jake and Bowling for Soup performed over forty shows as part of their Back for the Attack Tour, which also featured The Aquabats on some dates.

On November 15, 2024, the band released a seven-song EP, Uncharted, which was produced by Bill Stevenson of the Descendents.

== Side projects ==
In 1996, Vinnie Fiorello and his friend John Janick launched the independent record label Fueled by Ramen, leaving it in 2006. On May 13, 2008, Fiorello launched his new indie label, called Paper + Plastick. In the press release, Fiorello stated the inspiration for the name; "If you think about it, prints and books are the paper side, while vinyl records and toys are the plastic side. It's a simple and to-the-point concept."

Fiorello also owns a toy company called Wünderland War, originally called "Monkey VS Robot". The name was changed due to legal issues. He has also started a second toy company with a friend called Symptoms. Many of these toys have been featured in art books and shows.

Roger Lima has a side-project called Rehasher, who have recorded an album Off Key Melodies on Gainesville-based record label No Idea Records in 2004. He plays guitar for Rehasher and is also the group's lead singer. Lima also has a recording studio at his home, dubbed as the "Moat House". Some local bands record music here, and Rehasher's second album, High Speed Access To My Brain, was recorded here.

JR Wasilewski composes his own solo music on top of working with a promoting company called the CT Mafia. He contributed one track to the Drive-Thru Records tribute to Bob Dylan, under the name "The Stay at Home Joneses", which also featured secondary vocals by Lima.

In 1996, Fiorello, Chris DeMakes, and Lima served as backup musicians for Asian Man Records owner Mike Park in The Bruce Lee Band (former sax player Derron Nuhfer also provided horns on some of the tracks).

Buddy Schaub is involved in a side band called PB&J, in which he provides the bass, vocals and occasional trombone, as well as the band Black Ice that he plays all instruments for. Schaub is one half of Coffee Project along with Jake Crown, who released a self-titled album on the aforementioned Paper + Plastick label. Together they decided that "a couple of acoustic guitars and a trombone was all they really needed".

DeMakes has been recording his own solo music while not working with Less Than Jake. He is a guest vocalist on the 2010 album The Seven Degrees Of Stephen Egerton by Descendents guitarist Stephen Egerton. He performed on the Ska Goes Solo Tour with JT Turret of The Arrogant Sons of Bitches and Ryan Eldred of Catch 22 in 2014. He released the song "Up" on the Ska Goes Solo split 7-inch prior to the tour.

DeMakes also is the host of his own podcast called Chris DeMakes a Podcast. Every week, he and a guest from the world of music discuss the subject of songwriting.

== Band members ==
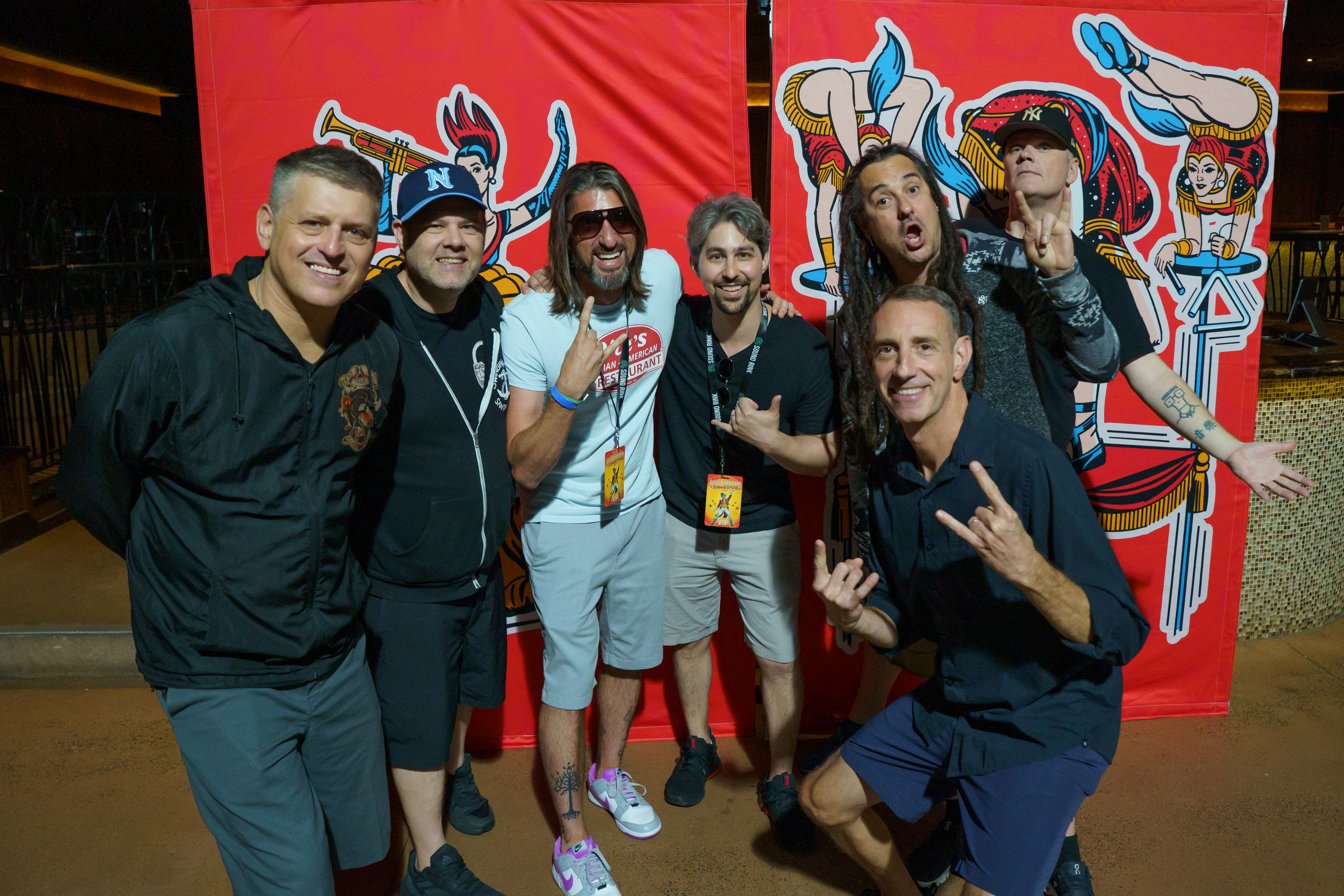
Less Than Jake posing with fans at Starland Ballroom in 2025

Current members

- Chris DeMakes – lead vocals, guitar (1992–present)
- Roger Lima – lead vocals, bass, occasional guitar (1993–present)
- Buddy "Goldfinger" Schaub – trombone, occasional bass, backing vocals (1993–present)
- Peter "JR" Wasilewski – saxophone, backing vocals (2000–present)
- Matt Yonker – drums (2018–present)

Former members

- Vinnie Fiorello – drums (1992–2018)
- Shaun Grief – bass (1992)
- Jessica Mills – saxophone (1993–1998)
- Derron Nuhfer – saxophone (1995–2000)
- Lars "Slim" Nylander – trombone (1998)
- Peter "Pete" Anna – trombone (1998–2001)

== Discography ==
- Pezcore (1995)
- Losing Streak (1996)
- Hello Rockview (1998)
- Borders & Boundaries (2000)
- Anthem (2003)
- In with the Out Crowd (2006)
- GNV FLA (2008)
- See the Light (2013)
- Silver Linings (2020)
