= Losing Streak =

Studio album by Less Than Jake
- Released: November 12, 1996
- Studios: Criteria (Miami); Mirror Image (Gainesville, Fla.)
- Genre: Ska punk
- Length: 35:26
- Label: Capitol
- Producers: Michael Rosen; Less Than Jake; Craig Aaronson

Less Than Jake chronology
Pezcore (1994)	Losing Streak (1996)	Hello Rockview (1998)

Singles from Losing Streak
- 1. "Automatic" Released: 1996; 2. "Dopeman" Released: 1996

Professional ratings
Review scores
Source	Rating
AllMusic	4.5/5 stars
Punknews.org	(10/10)

Losing Streak is the second studio album by ska punk band Less Than Jake, released on November 12, 1996, on Capitol Records. The album was recorded at Criteria Studios in Miami and Mirror Image Studios in Gainesville, Florida, both with producer Michael Rosen. Drums and bass were recorded at the former, while everything else was recorded at the latter. The album includes re-recordings of "Jen Doesn't Like Me Anymore" and "Johnny Quest Thinks We're Sellouts", both of which appeared on Pezcore. Losing Streak was re-released with Hello Rockview as a double album in 2000.

The album reached #18 on the Top Heatseekers chart.

== Music videos ==
The album's first track, "Automatic" was featured in a music video on MTV alternative music showcase 120 Minutes. The video consisted of fan video footage from shows in Gainesville, Florida, and Chicago.

A controversial video was also made for "Dopeman". MTV has refused to air the video allegedly due to drug references. Band supporters maintain that the song has fewer references to drugs than many videos played on MTV and is actually commenting on the negative aspects of a "Dopeman" lifestyle. In addition claims have been made that the band Sugar Ray copied the video's concept in one of their own music videos.

== Hidden track ==
Losing Streak features a hidden track accessible only by rewinding the CD about a minute and forty one seconds before the beginning of track 1. The track features banter spoken by former band mascot "Howie J. Reynolds", an elderly Gainesville local, similar in concept to Sublime's recorded rantings of a mentally ill man on Robbin' the Hood. This leads into track 1, which begins with him stating, "This is the old dude, Howard J. Reynolds, and you're listening to 'Less Than Jake'".

Not all CDs have this hidden track.

== Track listing ==
1. "Automatic" – 2:06 (plus 1:45 hidden pre-track titled Yom Kippur)
2. "Happyman" – 1:59
3. "9th at Pine" – 1:56
4. "Sugar in Your Gas Tank" – 2:06
5. "Shindo" – 2:17
6. "107" – 1:59
7. "Johnny Quest Thinks We're Sellouts" – 2:49
8. "Krazy Glue" – 1:58
9. "Never Going Back to New Jersey" – 3:18
10. "How's My Driving, Doug Hastings?" – 1:24
11. "Just Like Frank" – 1:50
12. "Ask the Magic 8 Ball" – 2:15
13. "Dopeman" – 2:06
14. "Jen Doesn't Like Me Anymore" – 2:50
15. "Rock-n-Roll Pizzeria" – 2:00
16. "Lockdown" – 2:33

== Personnel ==
- Chris DeMakes - guitar, vocals
- Roger Lima - bass, vocals
- Vinnie Fiorello - drums, lyrics
- Buddy Schaub - trombone
- Jessica Mills - alto saxophone
- Derron Nuhfer - baritone saxophone

== Charts ==
Chart (1996)	Peak position
US Heatseekers Albums (Billboard)	18
