= Hello Rockview =

Studio album by Less Than Jake
- Released: October 6, 1998
- Recorded: 1998, Mirror Image Studios, Gainesville, Florida, U.S.
- Genres: Ska punk; punk rock; pop punk
- Length: 37:52
- Label: Capitol
- Producer: Howard Benson

Less Than Jake chronology
Losing Streak (1996)	Hello Rockview (1998)	Borders & Boundaries (2000)

Singles from Hello Rockview
- 1. "History of a Boring Town" Released: 1998; 2. "All My Best Friends Are Metalheads" Released: July 4, 2000

Hello Rockview is the third studio album by ska punk band Less Than Jake, released on October 6, 1998. Produced by Howard Benson, it is the band's second and final album on Capitol Records, and recorded at Mirror Image Studios in Gainesville, Florida. The album is the first to feature trombonist Pete Anna, who joined the band during its recording. The album is dedicated in memory of Niki Wood.

The album yielded two singles, "History of a Boring Town" and "All My Best Friends Are Metalheads", with "History of a Boring Town" reaching #39 on the Billboard Modern Rock Tracks Chart.

== Writing and recording ==
The lyrics follow four years of drummer and lyricist Vinnie Fiorello's life when arranged in a non-studio order and is named after one of Vinnie's oldest friends who was imprisoned at Rockview State Correctional Institution. The recording of Hello Rockview in 1998 marked the first time producer Howard Benson used the Auto-Tune software, which had been released to the public the previous year. He recalled in 2014, "I remember putting it into the computer and the singer Chris DeMakes was probably the first rock singer ever to sing through Auto-Tune because it didn’t exist before then." Benson adds, "I remember thinking 'oh my god', because at that time, we tuned vocals using Eventide harmonizers, whatever we could do to change pitch. And it was a horrendously archaic way of working." Benson has also said that he believes he overused it on the record, with the software even being used to tune the horns. Benson claimed that tuning the horns "was a huge mistake", because "they sound like square waves on that record. It was a different sound because I put it on everything. I was like 'hey this’ll tune everything'. I put the guitars through it. It didn’t work on everything."

== Artwork ==
The CD booklet had the unorthodox format of a comic book. It was illustrated by Steve Vance, who would later illustrate the song artwork for "The Ghosts of Me and You" on Anthem. Stylistically, it is similar to Dick Tracy. Each page is a separate song, with all dialog, thoughts, and captions being the lyrics to each song. The lyrics themselves all appear in proper order, but the order of the individual songs is different from that of the track list.

== Reception ==
Professional ratings
Review scores
Source	Rating
AllMusic	3/5 stars
Kerrang!	4/5 stars
Ox-Fanzine	Favorable
Wall of Sound	67/100

NME listed the album as one of "20 Pop Punk Albums Which Will Make You Nostalgic", saying that it is "A soundtrack to shoving your friends, listening to 'All My Best Friends Are Metalheads' and wondering how you ever liked pop punk which didn't have a trombone." Cleveland.com ranked "All My Friends are Metalheads" at number 58 on their list of the top 100 pop-punk songs.

== Track listing ==
1. "Last One Out of Liberty City" – 2:01
2. "Help Save the Youth of America from Exploding" – 2:53
3. "All My Best Friends Are Metalheads" – 3:31
4. "Five State Drive" – 2:48
5. "Nervous in the Alley" – 2:54
6. "Motto" – 3:14
7. "History of a Boring Town" – 3:22
8. "Great American Sharpshooter" – 1:28
9. "Danny Says" – 2:51
10. "Big Crash" – 2:43
11. "Theme Song for H Street" – 2:43
12. "Richard Allen George... No, It's Just Cheez" – 1:46
13. "Scott Farcas Takes It on the Chin" – 2:34
14. "Al's War" – 3:04

(In 2000, Hello Rockview was re-released with a bonus disc of Less Than Jake's 1996 release Losing Streak)

== Personnel ==
Less Than Jake

- Chris DeMakes – vocals, guitar
- Roger Lima– vocals, bass
- Vinnie Fiorello – drums, lyrics
- Buddy Schaub – trombone
- Pete Anna – trombone
- Derron Nuhfer – saxophone

Additional musicians

- Howard Benson – additional keyboards

Production

- Howard Benson – producer, editing
- Less Than Jake – producer
- Steve Kravac – engineer
- Ronny Cates – assistant engineer
- Chris Lord-Alge – mixing
- Mike – assistant mixing engineer
- Terry – assistant mixing engineer
- Bob Ludwig – mastering
- Danny O'Bryan – production coordination
- Steve Vance – illustration and design
- Less Than Jake – art direction

== Chart positions ==
Chart (1998)	Peak position
US Billboard 200	80
