= Vinnie Fiorello =

American drummer

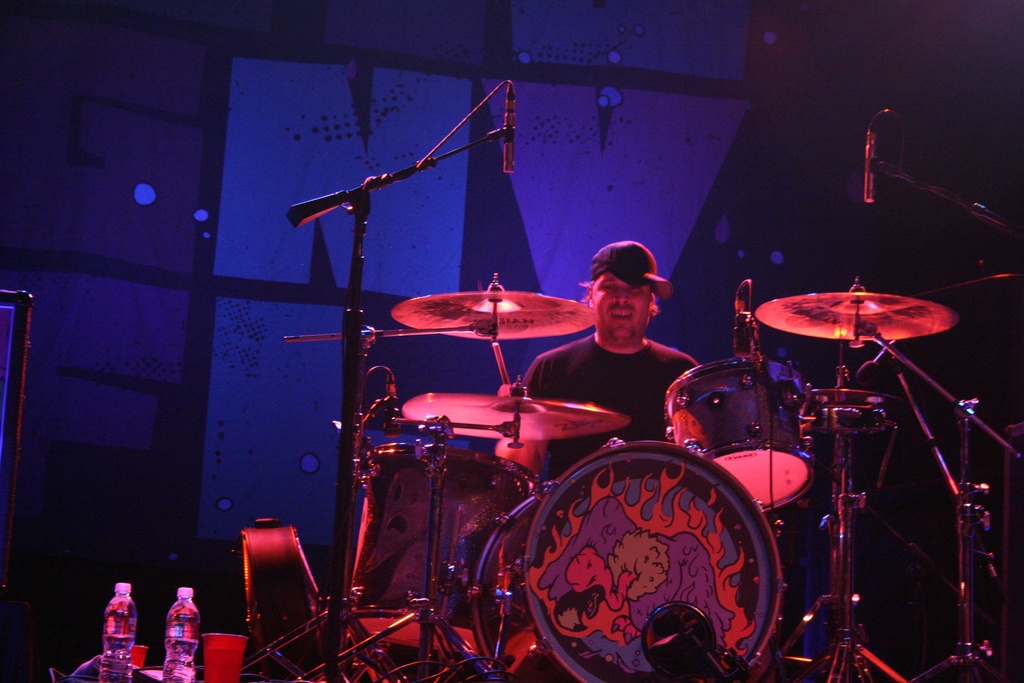
- Fiorello in concert with Less Than Jake, 2008
- Born: June 24, 1974 (age 52); Rahway, New Jersey, U.S.
- Education: University of Florida
- Occupations: Musician; songwriter; businessman
- Years active: 1992–present
- Musical career
- Genres: Ska punk; pop punk; punk rock
- Instruments: Drums; percussion
- Member of: The Inevitables
- Formerly of: Less Than Jake

Vincent "Vinnie" Fiorello (born June 24, 1974) is an American rock musician and businessman. He co-founded the ska punk band Less Than Jake in 1992, and was the band's drummer and lyricist until 2018. He also founded the record labels Fueled by Ramen, Sleep It Off Records, and Paper + Plastick, in addition to several local businesses in Gainesville, Florida.

== Biography ==
Fiorello was born on June 24, 1974, in Rahway, New Jersey. He grew up in New Jersey but moved to Gainesville, Florida, at age 16.

Vinnie Fiorello and Chris DeMakes founded the band Less Than Jake while attending the University of Florida in 1992. Band members have told various media outlets different versions of the origin of the band's name. DeMakes has stated in interviews that the band's name came from Fiorello's family's pet parrot. His story claimed that the parrot would squawk during the band's practice sessions, leading to Fiorello's mother telling the band that they needed to stop playing because they were disturbing the bird. This would lead to the band referring to themselves as being "less than Jake." In June 2020, however, Fiorello clarified that Jake was not a parrot but was, in fact, an English Bulldog.

In 1996, Fiorello co-founded the record label Fueled by Ramen with John Janick. He left the label in 2006.

In the summer of 2015, Fiorello and his friend Eric Jazvac opened a tattoo parlor, Wunderland Custom Tattooing, in downtown Gainesville, Florida.

On October 24, 2018, Fiorello announced that while he would remain a member of Less Than Jake, he would no longer be touring with the band. After Fiorello's announcement, the band recruited Teen Idols drummer Matt Yonker as their touring drummer. On September 1, 2019, Roger Lima announced via social media that despite prior reports, Fiorello was no longer with the band in any capacity and would not be participating in the creation of the band's upcoming album.

In October 2019, High Times reported that Fiorello had founded a CBD brand called Sailor Diggen's Finest.

In 2020, Fiorello co-founded the ska-punk supergroup/multimedia project, The Inevitables with Obi Fernandez of Westbound Train, in which Fiorello is also the drummer and a songwriter for.

== Personal life ==
Fiorello has a daughter, who was born on September 3, 2011.
