= Perry Como discography =

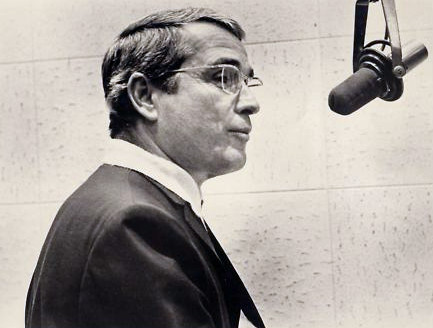
- Perry Como in the recording studio, circa mid-1960s.
- Studio albums: 38
- Live albums: 2
- Compilation albums: 32
- Singles: 150
- Perry Como Decca Recordings: 21
- RCA Victor 10": 8
- RCA Victor 12": 40
- RCA Camden 12": 18

Perry Como was a prolific American recording artist for RCA Victor Records from 1943 until 1987. Over the decades, Como is reported to have sold over 100 million records; at least eleven of his singles sold over a million copies, and he earned 27 gold records.

Como was also well known for his recordings and performances in the intimate Easy listening style and religious music of Christian and Jewish faiths. His first religious recordings, "Ave Maria" and "The Lord's Prayer", were recorded in 1949 in a church, with Como asking his parish priest to sit in on the recording sessions, to make certain they were done in the proper reverential tone. While his performances of "Ave Maria" became traditional on his holiday shows, Como would not perform it for live concert appearances, despite the frequent requests of his audiences, saying, "It's not the time or place to do it." In 1953, Perry Como recorded "Eli, Eli" and "Kol Nidrei", and performed the latter on his television shows each year at the appropriate time on the Jewish calendar. His pronunciation and phrasing in both Hebrew and Yiddish were learned from a member of the Mitchell Ayres Orchestra, who was the son of a rabbi.

Perry Como received five Emmys from 1955 to 1959, a Christopher Award (1956) and shared a Peabody Award with good friend Jackie Gleason in 1956. He was inducted into the Academy of Television Arts & Sciences Hall of Fame in 1990 and received a Kennedy Center Honor in 1987. Posthumously, Como received the Grammy Lifetime Achievement Award in 2002; he was inducted into the Long Island Music Hall of Fame in 2006 and the Hit Parade Hall of Fame in 2007. Como has the distinction of having three stars on the Hollywood Walk of Fame for his work in radio, television, and music.

== Recordings ==
When Perry Como signed his first RCA Victor contract on June 17, 1943, and made his first recording for the company three days later, the 1942–44 musicians' strike (also known as the American Federation of Musicians (AFM) recording ban) was in full force. Union musicians were allowed to play for live appearances and radio programs, but not to participate in any recording sessions; it was a means to force the record companies to pay royalties to their musical performers. While Como and other vocalists were able to have the backing of a band for a live concert or radio show, that would disappear when they entered the recording studio.

RCA Victor promotional pinback for Perry Como Week. September 2 – 9, 1946

One way the recording industry of the time found to circumvent the problem was to replace the bands with various vocal groups. Como's first RCA Victor record, "Goodbye, Sue", was produced in this manner, along with other Como releases during the strike. The only exception to the musicians' strike or ban was for V-Discs after October 27, 1943, which were distributed to the American Armed Forces and not sold commercially. Two versions of "Goodbye, Sue" were produced: one using a vocal chorus for backup commercially issued by RCA Victor and another made in 1944, with full orchestral accompaniment, available as a V-Disc only. Prior to the strike, popular music had been focused on the big bands, where vocal performers were merely featured as part of their performances. Singers came into their own, most likely to some extent because of the strike, and the situation was reversed, with the bands becoming a "backdrop" for vocalists-a very positive career boost for Como and his counterparts. Where previously Como needed to be hired by Freddy Carlone and Ted Weems, by 1948 he was now in the position to hire the band. Mitchell Ayres, who was Como's musical director from 1948 until 1963, was offered the job during a game of golf.

In 1945, Como recorded the pop ballad "Till the End of Time" (based on Chopin's "Heroic Polonaise"), which marked the beginning of a highly successful career. He also became the first pop singer to reach the two million sales mark with two records in release at the same time - "Till the End of Time" and "If I Loved You", that same year. Como was the first artist to have ten records sell more than one million copies. Como's average yearly record sales were four million, beginning in 1943; RCA turned out four million Perry Como records in one week in 1946, setting a record at the time. Just three years after Como's first record for RCA Victor, "Goodbye, Sue", his records were selling so well, the company declared the week of September 2 – 9, 1946 "Perry Como Week". Six new Como songs were released along with six new versions of some of his older songs, as well as re-issuing 14 of his previous hit records.

There was a second strike of the American Federation of Musicians in 1948. Due to the advent of television; royalties for the new medium were the issue. Most record companies had once more stockpiled recordings of their artists as had been done in advance of the 1942–1944 strike, and again used vocal groups to replace striking musicians when recording new material. RCA Victor kept Perry Como busy in advance of the strike; he produced three years worth of recordings during that time. With this strike lasting less than a year, Como's only recording during the ban was "N'yot N'yow" (The Pussycat Song), with the Fontane Sisters from his radio and television shows. When the 1948 Musicians' strike ended on December 14, 1948, a race began between the record companies, each trying to have the first post-strike record on the market. RCA was the winner with Como having recorded "Missouri Waltz" in the evening and RCA had it in the shops by noon the next day. Como went from the gala recording at RCA Victor of "I'm Just Wild About Harry" for President Harry Truman celebrating the end of the strike, into another of their studios to record "Missouri Waltz".

In 1956, he recorded his first movie theme song, "Somebody Up There Likes Me", for the Rocky Graziano film of the same name. In the same year, long-time Como associate Mickey Glass found Perry a hit through a late-night subway ride home. Riding along with him in the same car was songwriter Dick Manning. As the two men talked, Glass mentioned the need for a novelty song for Como. Manning replied that he had just done a demo recording like that which had yet to be heard by anyone. They arranged to meet the next day; the result of the chance meeting was Como's "Hot Diggity".

On March 14, 1958, the RIAA certified Como's hit single, "Catch a Falling Star" as its first ever Gold Record. "Catch a Falling Star" was written by Paul Vance and Lee Pockriss. The pair were also responsible for penning "Itsy Bitsy Teeny Weeny Yellow Polka Dot Bikini". Como won the 1958 Grammy Award for Best Vocal Performance, male for "Catch a Falling Star". His final Top 40 hit was a cover of Don McLean's "And I Love You So", recorded in 1973. Quoting Como (who in 1979, signed a 10-year extension of his RCA contract) regarding his last two hits ("It's Impossible" and "And I Love You So"), "I wasn't looking for such big hits at that point in my career." For "It's Impossible", Como learned the details on Top 40 music from his young neighbors: "But the kids in our neighborhood came out and said, 'Well, we're finally glad you made it to our list.' I didn't know what they were talking about. They have all kind of Top 40s. How they grabbed onto this is a little beyond me." The record was nominated for a Grammy in three categories. "And I Love You So" was such a hit that RCA prevailed on him to record it again, this time in Spanish. When Como said he didn't speak the language, David Franko, the head of RCA International, provided personal language lessons to get the recording made. The song was also Como's biggest hit in England, staying in the UK Top 20 for close to a year. After Como performed some concerts in the UK, the album went back to number one once again. In 1974, Como recorded a song called "Christmas Dream" for the soundtrack of the movie, The Odessa File.

In 1987, he recorded his final album for RCA, Today, with his trusted friend and associate Nick Perito at Evergreen Studios, Burbank, California. His recording of "The Wind Beneath My Wings" was almost autobiographical, a fitting end to a long and successful recording career. Como recorded only once more, privately, for his well-known Christmas Concert in Ireland in 1994.

== Singles, albums and hits ==
Como had, according to Joel Whitburn's compilations of the U.S. Pop Charts, fourteen songs that reached No. 1 on at least one of the three Billboard charts (sales, disc-jockeys, jukeboxes): "Till The End Of Time" (1945); "Prisoner of Love" (1946); "Surrender" (1946); "Chi-Baba, Chi-Baba" (1947); "'A' You're Adorable" (1949); "Some Enchanted Evening" (1949); "Hoop-De-Doo" (1950); "If" (1951); "Don't Let The Stars Get In Your Eyes" (1952); "No Other Love" (1953); "Wanted" (1954); "Hot Diggity (Dog Ziggity Boom)" (1956); "Round And Round" (1957); and "Catch a Falling Star" (1957).

=== Early recordings ===
All are with the Ted Weems Orchestra.

Perry Como Decca recordings
| Title | Recording date | Recording location | Company information |
| "A Gypsy Told Me" | 2-22-1938 | New York City | Decca 1695 A |
| "Angeline" | 12-9-1941 | Los Angeles | Decca 4131 A |
| "Class Will Tell" | 3-11-1939 | New York city | Decca 2365 A |
| "Deep In the Heart of Texas" | 12-9-1941 | Los Angeles | Decca 4138 A |
| "Fooled By the Moon" | 8-6-1936 | unk. | Decca 921B |
| "Goodnight My Love" | 1937 | unk. | unk. |
| "Goody Goodbye" | 10-4-1939 | New York City | Decca 2794 A |
| "Hallucinative" | 1937 | unk. | unk. |
| "Having a Lonely Time" (with Elmo Tanner) | 8-23-1938 | Los Angeles | Decca 4131 B |
| "I Wonder Who's Kissing Her Now" | 10-5-1939 | New York City | Decca 2919 A |
| "In My Little Red Book" (with Elmo Tanner) | 2-23-1938 | New York City | Decca 1695 A |
| "It All Comes Back to Me Now" | 1-28-1941 | New York City | Decca 3627 A |
| "Lazy Weather" (with Elmo Tanner) | 5-15-1936 | Chicago | Decca 822 A Decca 1006 |
| "May I Never Love Again" | 1-27-1941 | New York City | Decca 3627 B |
| "Ollie Ollie Outs in Free" | 12-9-1941 | Los Angeles | Decca 4138 B |
| "Rainbow on the River" | 9-27-1936 | Chicago | Decca 969 B |
| "Robins and Roses" | 8-23-1938 | Los Angeles | Decca 2041 |
| "Rose of the Rockies" (with Elmo Tanner) | 1-28-1941 | New York City | Decca 3628 B |
| "That Old Gang of Mine" | 10-4-1939 | New York City | Decca 2829 A |
| "Until Today" | 1936 | unk. | unk. |
| "You Can't Pull the Wool Over My Eyes" | 5-15-1936 | Chicago | Decca 820 B |

=== Albums ===
RCA Victor 10"
| 1946 | Perry Como – His Latest and Greatest |
| 1951 | Perry Como Sings Merry Christmas Music |
| 1952 | TV Favorites |
| 1952 | A Sentimental Date with Perry |
| 1952 | Supper Club Favorites |
| 1953 | Hits from Broadway Shows |
| 1953 | Around the Christmas Tree |
| 1953 | I Believe – Songs of All Faiths Sung by Perry Como |
| 1954 | Como's Golden Records |

=== Albums ===
RCA Victor 12"
| 1955 | So Smooth |
| 1956 | Relaxing with Perry Como |
| 1956 | Perry Como Sings Hits from Broadway Shows |
| 1956 | A Sentimental Date with Perry Como |
| 1956 | I Believe |
| 1956 | Perry Como Sings Merry Christmas Music |
| 1957 | We Get Letters |
| 1958 | Saturday Night with Mr. C |
| 1958 | When You Come to the End of the Day |
| 1958 | Como's Golden Records |
| 1959 | Como Swings |
| 1959 | Season's Greetings from Perry Como |
| 1961 | For the Young at Heart |
| 1961 | Sing to Me Mr. C |
| 1962 | By Request |
| 1962 | The Best of Irving Berlin's Songs from Mr. President |
| 1963 | Perry at His Best |
| 1963 | The Songs I Love |
| 1965 | The Scene Changes |
| 1966 | Lightly Latin |
| 1966 | Perry Como in Italy |
| 1968 | The Perry Como Christmas Album |
| 1968 | Home for the Holidays |
| 1968 | Look to Your Heart |
| 1969 | Seattle |
| 1970 | Perry Como in Person at the International Hotel, Las Vegas |
| 1970 | This Is Perry Como |
| 1970 | It's Impossible |
| 1971 | I Think of You |
| 1972 | This is Perry Como Vol. 2 |
| 1973 | And I Love You So |
| 1974 | Perry |
| 1975 | Just Out of Reach |
| 1976 | Perry Como: A Legendary Performer |
| 1977 | The Best of British |
| 1978 | Where You're Concerned |
| 1980 | Perry Como |
| 1981 | Perry Como Live on Tour |
| 1982 | I Wish It Could Be Christmas Forever |
| 1983 | So It Goes / Goodbye for Now |
| 1987 | Today |

RCA Camden 12"
| 1957 | Dream Along with Me |
| 1958 | Perry Como Sings Just for You |
| 1959 | Perry Como's Wednesday Night Music Hall |
| 1960 | Dreamer's Holiday |
| 1961 | Perry Como Sings Merry Christmas Music |
| 1962 | Make Someone Happy |
| 1963 | An Evening with Perry Como |
| 1964 | Love Makes the World Go 'Round |
| 1965 | Somebody Loves Me |
| 1966 | No Other Love |
| 1967 | Hello Young Lovers |
| 1968 | You Are Never Far Away |
| 1969 | The Lord's Prayer |
| 1970 | Easy Listening |
| 1971 | Door of Dreams |
| 1972 | The Shadow of Your Smile |
| 1973 | Dream On Little Dreamer |
| 1974 | The Sweetest Sounds |

==== Selected compilation albums ====
Selected compilation albums
| 1956 | Perry Como Sings Hits from Broadway Shows |
| 1958 | Como's Golden Records |
| 1970 | This Is Perry Como |
| 1972 | This Is Perry Como Volume 2 |
| 1975 | The First Thirty Years |
| 1975 | Perry Como -Superstar |
| 1975 | Perry Como – A Legendary Performer |
| 1975 | Pure Gold |
| 1979 | 1940–41 Broadcast Recordings |
| 1981 | Young Perry Como |
| 1982 | Collector's Items |
| 1983 | Christmas with Perry Como |
| 1984 | The Young Perry Como |
| 1984 | Perry Como |
| 1984 | Crosby & Como |
| 1986 | The Best of Times |
| 1988 | Jukebox Baby |
| 1993 | Yesterday & Today:A Celebration in Song |
| 1995 | World of Dreams |
| 1995 | The Perry Como Shows: 1943-Volume 1 |
| 1995 | The Perry Como Shows: 1943 -Volume 2 |
| 1995 | The Perry Como Shows: 1943 ~ Volume 3 |
| 1997 | Perry Como: V-Disc Recordings: A Musical Contribution By America's Best For Our Armed Forces Overseas |
| 1998 | The Long Lost Hits of Perry Como |
| 1998 | Perry-Go-Round |
| 1999 | The Essential 60's Singles Collection |
| 1999 | Greatest Hits |
| 1999 | I Want To Thank You Folks |
| 1999 | Class Will Tell |
| 1999 | The Greatest Christmas Songs |
| 2000 | The Very Best of Perry Como |
| 2001 | Perry Como Sings Songs Of Faith & Inspiration |
| 2001 | The Perry Como Christmas Album |
| 2001 | Perry Como With The Fontane Sisters |
| 2006 | Juke Box Baby |
| 2006 | One More Time ~ Perry Como & The Fontane Sisters |

=== On the Radio – The Perry Como Shows 1943 ===
On November 10, 2009, On the Air issued a three disk box set of recordings made from Como's CBS radio show Columbia Presents Como called On the Radio – The Perry Como Shows 1943. Como was the host of this radio show from March 12, 1943, until December 11, 1944, when he moved to NBC as the host of The Chesterfield Supper Club. The Raymond Scott Orchestra was heard with Como while he was on CBS. These recordings were originally issued individually in 1996 as The Perry Como Shows-1943: Volume 1, The Perry Como Shows-1943: Volume 2, and The Perry Como Shows-1943: Volume 3.

=== Chesterfield Supper Club ===
On September 21, 2010, Sounds of Yesteryear issued a compact disk compiled from transcripts of The Chesterfield Supper Club made for the Armed Forces Radio Service (AFRS) in May 1946. A second compilation compact disk with transcriptions from 1946 and 1947 was issued on March 15, 2011, and a third compilation disk was issued on August 16, 2011.

Chesterfield Supper Club
| 2010 | At the Supper Club |
| 2011 | At the Supper Club Part II |
| 2011 | At the Supper Club Part III |

=== Hit records ===
(Songs that reached the top of the US, Canadian, or UK charts)

Between 1944 and 1958, Perry Como had 48 hits on Billboard's charts.

| Year | Single | Chart positions | | | | |
| Year | Single | US | US AC | CAN | UK | US Country |
|---|---|---|---|---|---|---|
| 1943 | [A-Side] "Goodbye, Sue" | 20 | — | — | — | — |
| 1943 | [B-Side] "There'll Soon Be a Rainbow" | 18 | — | — | — | — |
| 1944 | "Have I Stayed Away Too Long?" | 14 | — | — | — | — |
| 1944 | [A-Side] "Long Ago (and Far Away)" | 8 | — | — | — | — |
| 1944 | [B-Side] "I Love You" | 16 | — | — | — | — |
| 1944 | "Lili Marlene" | 13 | — | — | — | — |
| 1945 | [A-Side] "I Dream of You" | 10 | — | — | — | — |
| 1945 | [B-Side] "Confessin'" | 12 | — | — | — | — |
| 1945 | "More and More" | 14 | — | — | — | — |
| 1945 | "Temptation" (gold record) | 15 | — | — | — | — |
| 1945 | [A-Side] "I'm Gonna Love That Gal" (gold record) | 4 | — | — | — | — |
| 1945 | [B-Side] "If I Loved You" | 3 | — | — | — | — |
| 1945 | [A-Side] "Till the End of Time"(double gold record) | 1 | — | — | — | — |
| 1945 | [B-Side] "(Did You Ever Get) That Feeling in the Moonlight" | 9 | — | — | — | — |
| 1945 | [A-Side] "Dig You Later (A Hubba Hubba Hubba)"(gold record) | 3 | — | — | — | — |
| 1945 | [B-Side] "Here Comes Heaven Again" | 12 | — | — | — | — |
| 1946 | [A-Side] "I'm Always Chasing Rainbows"(gold record) | 5 | — | — | — | — |
| 1946 | [B-Side] "You Won't Be Satisfied (Until You Break My Heart)" | 5 | — | — | — | — |
| 1946 | [A-Side] "Prisoner of Love"(gold record) | 1 | — | — | — | — |
| 1946 | [B-Side] "All Through the Day" | 8 | — | — | — | — |
| 1946 | [A-Side] "They Say It's Wonderful" | 4 | — | — | — | — |
| 1946 | [B-Side] "If You Were the Only Girl in the World" | 14 | — | — | — | — |
| 1946 | [A-Side] "Surrender"(gold record) | 1 | — | — | — | — |
| 1946 | [B-Side] "More Than You Know" | 19 | — | — | — | — |
| 1946 | "A Garden in the Rain" | 22 | — | — | — | — |
| 1946 | "If I'm Lucky" | 19 | — | — | — | — |
| 1946 | "Winter Wonderland" | 10 | — | — | — | — |
| 1947 | [A-Side] "Sonata" | 9 | — | — | — | — |
| 1947 | [B-Side] "That's the Beginning of the End" | 19 | — | — | — | — |
| 1947 | [A-Side] "I Want to Thank Your Folks" | 21 | — | — | — | — |
| 1947 | [B-Side] "That's Where I Came In" | 21 | — | — | — | — |
| 1947 | [A-Side] "Chi-Baba, Chi-Baba (My Bambino Go to Sleep)"(gold record) | 1 | — | — | — | — |
| 1947 | [B-Side] "When You Were Sweet Sixteen" | 2 | — | — | — | — |
| 1947 | "I Wonder Who's Kissing Her Now" (with Ted Weems) | 2 | — | — | — | — |
| 1947 | [A-Side] "So Far" | 11 | — | — | — | — |
| 1947 | [B-Side] "A Fellow Needs a Girl" | 25 | — | — | — | — |
| 1947 | "Two Loves Have I" | 21 | — | — | — | — |
| 1947 | "White Christmas" | 23 | — | — | — | — |
| 1948 | "Pianissimo" | 21 | — | — | — | — |
| 1948 | "Because"(gold record) | 4 | — | — | — | — |
| 1948 | "Haunted Heart" | 23 | — | — | — | |
| 1948 | "Laroo, Laroo, Lilli Bolero" | 20 | — | — | — | — |
| 1948 | "Rambling Rose" | 18 | — | — | — | — |
| 1949 | "Far Away Places" | 4 | — | — | — | — |
| 1949 | "N'yot N'yow (The Pussy Cat Song)" | 20 | — | — | — | — |
| 1949 | "Blue Room" | 18 | — | — | — | — |
| 1949 | [A-Side] "Forever and Ever" | 2 | — | — | — | — |
| 1949 | [B-Side] "I Don't See Me in Your Eyes Anymore" | 11 | — | — | — | — |
| 1949 | "'A' - You're Adorable" | 2* | — | — | — | — |
| 1949 | [A-Side] "Some Enchanted Evening"(gold record) | 1 | — | — | — | — |
| 1949 | [B-Side] "Bali Ha'i" | 5 | — | — | — | — |
| 1949 | [A-Side] "Just One Way to Say I Love You" | 23 | — | — | — | — |
| 1949 | [B-Side] "Let's Take an Old-Fashioned Walk" | 15 | — | — | — | — |
| 1949 | "Give Me Your Hand" | 23 | — | — | — | — |
| 1949 | "A Dreamer's Holiday" | 3 | — | — | — | — |
| 1949 | "I Wanna Go Home" | 18 | — | — | — | — |
| 1949 | [A-Side] "Ave Maria" | 22 | — | — | — | — |
| 1949 | [B-Side] "The Lord's Prayer" | 28 | — | — | — | — |
| 1950 | "Bibbidi-Bobbidi-Boo" | 14 | — | — | — | — |
| 1950 | [A-Side] "Hoop-Dee-Doo" | 2* | — | — | — | — |
| 1950 | [B-Side] "On the Outgoing Tide" | 16 | — | — | — | — |
| 1950 | "I Cross My Fingers" | 25 | — | — | — | — |
| 1950 | "Patricia" | 7 | — | — | — | — |
| 1950 | "A Bushel and a Peck"(w/ Betty Hutton) | 3 | — | — | — | — |
| 1950 | "You're Just in Love" | 5 | — | — | — | — |
| 1951 | [A-Side] "If (They Made Me a King)"(gold record) | 1 | — | — | — | — |
| 1951 | [B-Side] "Zing Zing Zoom Zoom" | 12 | — | — | — | — |
| 1951 | "Hello, Young Lovers" | 27 | — | — | — | — |
| 1951 | [A-Side] "There's No Boat Like a Rowboat" | 20 | — | — | — | — |
| 1951 | [B-Side] "There's a Big Blue Cloud (Next to Heaven)" | 25 | — | — | — | — |
| 1951 | [A-Side] "Rollin' Stone" | 24 | — | — | — | — |
| 1951 | [B-Side] "With All My Heart and Soul" | 28 | — | — | — | — |
| 1951 | "It's Beginning to Look a Lot Like Christmas" | 19 | — | — | — | — |
| 1952 | [A-Side] "Tulips and Heather" | 16 | — | — | — | — |
| 1952 | [B-Side] "Please Mr. Sun" | 12 | — | — | — | — |
| 1952 | "Noodlin' Rag" | 23 | — | — | — | — |
| 1952 | "One Little Candle" | 18 | — | — | — | — |
| 1952 | [A-Side] "Maybe"(w/ Eddie Fisher) | 3 | — | — | — | — |
| 1952 | [B-Side] "Watermelon Weather"(w/ Eddie Fisher) | 19 | — | — | — | — |
| 1952 | "My Love and Devotion" | 22 | — | — | — | — |
| 1952 | "To Know You (Is to Love You)" | 19 | — | — | — | — |
| 1952 | [A-Side] "Don't Let the Stars Get in Your Eyes"(gold record) | 1 | — | — | 1 | — |
| 1952 | [B-Side] "Lies" | 30 | — | — | — | — |
| 1953 | [A-Side] "Wild Horses" | 6 | — | — | — | — |
| 1953 | [B-Side] "I Confess" | 17 | — | — | — | — |
| 1953 | [A-Side] "Say You're Mine Again" | 3 | — | — | — | — |
| 1953 | [B-Side] "My One and Only Heart" | 11 | — | — | — | — |
| 1953 | [A-Side] "No Other Love" | 2* | — | — | — | — |
| 1953 | [B-Side] "Keep It Gay" | 30 | — | — | — | — |
| 1953 | [A-Side] "Pa-Paya Mama" | 11 | — | — | — | — |
| 1953 | [B-Side] "You Alone (Solo Tu)" | 9 | — | — | — | — |
| 1954 | [A-Side] "Wanted"(gold record) | 1 | — | — | 4 | — |
| 1954 | [B-Side] "Look Out of the Window (And See How I'm Standing in the Rain)" | 24 | — | — | — | — |
| 1954 | "Idle Gossip" | — | — | — | 3 | — |
| 1954 | [A-Side] "Hit and Run Affair" | 15 | — | — | — | — |
| 1954 | [B-Side] "There Never Was a Night So Beautiful" | 21 | — | — | — | — |
| 1954 | [A-Side] "Papa Loves Mambo"(gold record) | 4 | — | — | 16 | — |
| 1954 | [B-Side] "The Things I Didn't Do" | 22 | — | — | — | — |
| 1954 | "(There's No Place Like) Home for the Holidays" | 8 | — | — | — | — |
| 1955 | "Ko-Ko-Mo (I Love You So)" | 2 | — | — | — | — |
| 1955 | [A-Side] "Chee Chee-Oo Chee (Sang the Little Bird)"(w/ Jaye P. Morgan) | 12 | — | — | — | — |
| 1955 | [B-Side] "Two Lost Souls"(w/ Jaye P. Morgan) | 18 | — | — | — | — |
| 1955 | [A-Side] "Tina Marie" | 5 | | — | 24 | |
| 1955 | [B-Side] "Fooled" | 20 | — | — | — | — |
| 1955 | [A-Side] "All at Once You Love Her" | 11 | — | — | — | — |
| 1955 | [B-Side] "The Rose Tattoo" | 79 | — | — | — | — |
| 1956 | [A-Side] "Hot Diggity (Dog Ziggity Boom)"(gold record) | 1 | — | — | 4 | — |
| 1956 | [B-Side] "Juke Box Baby" | 10 | — | — | 22 | — |
| 1956 | [A-Side] "More" | 4 | — | — | 10 | — |
| 1956 | [B-Side] "Glendora" | 8 | — | — | 18 | — |
| 1956 | [A-Side] "Somebody Up There Likes Me"; Used in the film Somebody Up There Likes Me | 18 | — | — | — | — |
| 1956 | [B-Side] "Dream Along with Me (I'm on My Way to a Star)" | 85 | — | — | — | — |
| 1956 | [A-Side] "Moonlight Love" | 42 | — | — | — | — |
| 1956 | [B-Side] "Chincherinchee" | 59 | — | — | — | — |
| 1957 | [A-Side] "Round and Round"(gold record) | 1 | — | 15 | — | — |
| 1957 | [B-Side] "Mi Casa, Su Casa" | 50 | — | — | — | — |
| 1957 | [A-Side] "The Girl with the Golden Braids" | 13 | — | 9 | — | — |
| 1957 | [B-Side] "My Little Baby" | 48 | — | 12 | — | — |
| 1957 | [A-Side] "Dancin'" | 76 | — | — | — | — |
| 1957 | [B-Side] "Marching Along To The Blues" | — | — | 18 | — | — |
| 1957 | [A-Side] "Just Born (To Be Your Baby)" | 12 | — | 19 | — | — |
| 1957 | [B-Side] "Ivy Rose" | 18 | — | 11 | — | — |
| 1957 | "Jingle Bells" | 74 | — | — | — | — |
| 1958 | [A-Side] "Catch a Falling Star"(gold record) | 1* | — | 12 | 9 | — |
| 1958 | [B-Side] "Magic Moments" | 4 | — | 12 | 1 | — |
| 1958 | [A-Side] "Kewpie Doll" | 6 | — | 11 | 9 | — |
| 1958 | [B-Side] "Dance Only With Me" | 19 | — | — | — | — |
| 1958 | "I May Never Pass This Way Again" | — | — | — | 15 | — |
| 1958 | [A-Side] "Moon Talk" | 28 | — | 16 | 17 | — |
| 1958 | [B-Side] "Beats There A Heart So True" | — | — | 16 | — | — |
| 1958 | [A-Side] "Love Makes the World Go 'Round" | 33 | — | 14 | 6 | — |
| 1958 | [B-Side] "Mandolins in the Moonlight" | 47 | — | — | 13 | — |
| 1959 | [A-Side] "Tomboy" | 29 | — | 11 | 10 | — |
| 1959 | [B-Side] "Kiss Me, Kiss Me, Kiss Me" | — | — | 11 | — | — |
| 1959 | "I Know" | 47 | — | 32 | 13 | — |
| 1960 | [A-Side] "Delaware" | 22 | — | 16 | 3 | — |
| 1960 | [B-Side] "I Know What God Is" | 81 | — | 16 | — | — |
| 1960 | "Make Someone Happy" | 80 | — | — | — | — |
| 1961 | "You're Following Me" | 92 | — | — | — | — |
| 1962 | "Caterina" | 23 | 6 | 13 | 37 | — |
| 1963 | "(I Love You) Don't You Forget It" | 39 | 16 | — | — | — |
| 1965 | "Dream On Little Dreamer" | 25 | 3 | 36 | — | — |
| 1965 | "Oowee, Oowee" | 88 | 18 | — | — | — |
| 1966 | "Coo Coo Roo Coo Coo Paloma" | — | 12 | — | — | — |
| 1967 | "Stop! And Think It Over" | 92 | 1 | — | — | — |
| 1967 | "I Looked Back" | — | 11 | — | — | — |
| 1967 | "You Made It That Way (Watermelon Summer)" | — | 2 | — | — | — |
| 1968 | "The Father of Girls" | 92 | 10 | — | — | — |
| 1968 | "Happy Man" | — | 12 | — | — | — |
| 1969 | [A-Side] "Seattle" | 38 | 2 | 37 | — | — |
| 1969 | [B-Side] "Sunshine Wine" | — | 18 | — | — | — |
| 1969 | "That's All This Old World Needs" | — | 37 | — | — | — |
| 1970 | "It's Impossible" | 10 | 1 | 37 | 4 | — |
| 1971 | "I Think of You" | 53 | 5 | 36 | 14 | — |
| 1971 | "My Days of Loving You" | — | 31 | — | — | — |
| 1973 | "And I Love You So" | 29 | 1 | 21 | 3 | — |
| 1973 | "For the Good Times" | — | — | — | 7 | — |
| 1973 | "Love Don't Care Where It Grows" | — | 16 | — | — | — |
| 1973 | "Walk Right Back" | — | — | — | 33 | — |
| 1974 | "I Want to Give" | — | — | — | 31 | — |
| 1974 | [A-Side] "Weave Me the Sunshine" | — | 5 | — | — | — |
| 1974 | [B-Side] "I Don't Know What He Told You" | — | 8 | — | — | — |
| 1974 | "Temptation" | — | 28 | — | — | — |
| 1974 | "Christmas Dream" | 92 | — | — | — | — |
| 1975 | "World of Dreams" | — | 21 | — | — | — |
| 1976 | "Just Out of Reach" | — | 24 | — | — | 100 |
| 1976 | "The Grass Keeps Right on Growin'" | — | 45 | — | — | — |
| 1980 | "When" | — | 44 | — | — | — |
| 1983 | "As My Love for You" | — | 45 | — | — | — |
| 2007 | "It's Beginning to Look a Lot Like Christmas" | — | — | — | 49 | — |
| 2008 | "It's Beginning to Look a Lot Like Christmas" | — | — | — | 47 | — |
| 2009 | "It's Beginning to Look a Lot Like Christmas" | — | — | — | 81 | — |
| 2018 | "It's Beginning to Look a Lot Like Christmas" | 35 | — | — | 89 | — |
| 2018 | "(There's No Place Like) Home for the Holidays" (1959 version) | 32 | — | — | — | — |
| 2019 | "It's Beginning to Look a Lot Like Christmas" | 28 | — | — | 63 | — |
| 2020 | "It's Beginning to Look a Lot Like Christmas" | 12 | — | — | 83 | — |
| 2020 | "(There's No Place Like) Home for the Holidays" (1959 version) | 22 | — | — | — | — |
| 2021 | "It's Beginning to Look a Lot Like Christmas" | 13 | — | — | 50 | — |
| 2021 | "(There's No Place Like) Home for the Holidays" (1959 version) | 28 | — | — | — | — |
| 2022 | "It's Beginning to Look a Lot Like Christmas" | 14 | — | — | 69 | — |
| 2022 | "(There's No Place Like) Home for the Holidays" (1959 version) | 41 | — | — | — | — |
| 2023 | "It's Beginning to Look a Lot Like Christmas" | 14 | — | — | 76 | — |
| 2023 | "(There's No Place Like) Home for the Holidays" (1954 version) | 50 | — | — | — | — |
| 2024 | "It's Beginning to Look a Lot Like Christmas" | 16 | — | 47 | 40 | — |
| 2025 | "It's Beginning to Look a Lot Like Christmas" | 18 | — | — | 31 | — |
| 2025 | "(There's No Place Like) Home for the Holidays" (1959 version) | 38 | — | — | — | — |

- When the peak position is marked with an asterisk, the song reached No. 1 in one (or two) of the three specific Billboard charts (sales, disc-jockeys, jukeboxes), but not on the overall Top 100. Regarding the peak positions of the songs between 1940 and 1955, priority was given to the sales chart, since an overall chart does not exist.

=== Holiday 100 chart entries ===
Since many radio stations in the US adopt a format change to Christmas music each December, many holiday hits have an annual spike in popularity during the last few weeks of the year and are retired once the season is over. In December 2011, Billboard began a Holiday Songs chart with 50 positions that monitors the last five weeks of each year to "rank the top holiday hits of all eras using the same methodology as the Hot 100, blending streaming, airplay, and sales data", and in 2013 the number of positions on the chart was doubled, resulting in the Holiday 100. A few Como recordings have made appearances on the Holiday 100 and are noted below according to the holiday season in which they charted there.

| Title | Holiday season peak chart positions | | | | | | | | | | | | | |
| Title | 2012 | 2013 | 2014 | 2015 | 2016 | 2017 | 2018 | 2019 | 2020 | 2021 | 2022 | 2023 | 2024 | 2025 |
|---|---|---|---|---|---|---|---|---|---|---|---|---|---|---|
| "All Through the Night" | — | — | — | — | — | — | 78 | 95 | 88 | — | — | — | — | — |
| "It's Beginning to Look a Lot Like Christmas" (with The Fontane Sisters) | — | 58 | 98 | — | 84 | 28 | 14 | 13 | 8 | 8 | 8 | 13 | 14 | 17 |
| "(There's No Place Like) Home for the Holidays" (1954 version) | 42 | 26 | — | — | — | — | — | — | — | — | 89 | 31 | 80 | 94 |
| "(There's No Place Like) Home for the Holidays" (1959 version) | — | — | 86 | 55 | 26 | 50 | 13 | 16 | 19 | 18 | 24 | — | 40 | 32 |

=== Final recordings ===
- 1994 Perry Como's Christmas Concert

== See also ==
- Perry Como albums
- List of songs recorded by Perry Como
- Best selling music artists
- List of popular music performers
- Perry Como television and radio shows
