= A Legendary Performer (Perry Como album) =

Compilation album by Perry Como
- Released: 1976
- Length: 37:27
- Label: RCA Records

Perry Como chronology
40 Greatest Hits (1975)	A Legendary Performer (1976)	The Best of British (1977)

A Legendary Performer is a compilation album by Perry Como released by RCA Records in 1976.

== Reception ==
Professional ratings
Review scores
Source	Rating
AllMusic	3/5 stars
The Encyclopedia of Popular Music	4/5 stars

Charles S. Wolfe wrote in his retrospective review for AllMusic that the release was "worth getting in album form for the booklet and photos."

== Track listing ==
12-inch LP (RCA CPL1-1752)

Side A
No.	Title	Writer(s)	Note(s)	Length
1.	"It's Impossible"	S. Wayne—A. Manzanero	Recorded May 8, 1970 in New York City; Arranged and Conducted by Marty Manning	3:15
2.	"And I Love You So"	Don McLean	Recorded January 17, 1973 in Nashville,Tennessee; Arranged by Chet Atkins	3:12
3.	"The Father of Girls"	Drake	Recorded December 29, 1967 in New York City; Arranged and Conducted by Nick Perito	3:29
4.	"This Is All I Ask"	Gordon Jenkins	Recorded March 19, 1963 in New York City; Mitchell Ayres and His Orchestra and the Ray Charles Singers	3:20
5.	"Souvenir d'Italie"	Scarnicci–Tarabusi–Luttazzi–Sigman	Recorded May 19, 1966 in Italy; Arranged and Conducted by Nick Perito	3:51
6.	"Dream Along with Me (I'm on My Way to a Star)"	Carl Sigman	Recorded June 7, 1956 in New York City; Mitchell Ayres and His Orchestra and the Ray Charles Singers	2:50

Side B
No.	Title	Writer(s)	Note(s)	Length
1.	"Temptation" (from the motion picture Going Hollywood)	Arthur Freed—Nacio Herb Brown	Recorded April 29, 1974 in New York City; Arranged and Conducted by Nick Perito
2.	"My Favorite Things" (from the Broadway musical production The Sound of Music)	Rodgers–Hammerstein	Recorded June 14, 1962 in New York City; Mitchell Ayres and His Orchestra and the Ray Charles Singers
3.	"Anema e core"	Tito Manlio—Salve D'Esposito—Manny Curtis—Harry Akst	Recorded May 17, 1966 in Italy; Arranged and Conducted by Nick Perito
4.	"Manhã de Carnaval (Carnival)" (from the film Black Orpheus)	Bonfá–Maria–Peretti–Creatore	Recorded February 28, 1966 in New York City; Conducted by Nick Perito with the Ray Charles Singers
5.	"Hot Diggity (Dog Ziggity Boom)"	Hoffman–Manning	Recorded February 2, 1956 in New York City; Mitchell Ayres and His Orchestra and the Ray Charles Singers
6.	"Sunrise, Sunset" (from the Broadway musical production Fiddler on the Roof)	Bock–Harnick	Recorded June 19, 1968 in New York City; Arranged and Conducted by Nick Parito
