= Perry Como Live on Tour =

Perry Como Live On Tour

Live album by Perry Como
- Released: April 1981
- Recorded: July 29–31, 1980
- Genre: Vocal
- Label: RCA Victor
- Producer: Mike Berniker

Perry Como chronology
Perry Como (1980)	Perry Como Live On Tour (1981)	Perry Como, So It Goes / Goodbye for Now (1983)

Perry Como Live On Tour was Perry Como's 27th 12" long-play album for RCA Records and his second live album. In 2015, RCA reissued the album for the first time on compact disc.

== Track listing ==
Side One

Como medley

1. "Till the End of Time"
2. "Round and Round"
3. "Catch a Falling Star"
4. "Prisoner of Love"
5. "Temptation"
6. "Hot Diggity"
7. "It's Impossible"
8. "Where or When" (music by Richard Rodgers and lyrics by Lorenz Hart)
9. "Beautiful Noise" (words and music by Neil Diamond)
10. "You Needed Me" (words and music by Randy Goodrum)
11. "Temptation" (music by Nacio Herb Brown and lyrics by Arthur Freed)

Bing Crosby medley

1. "Blue Skies" (words and music by Irving Berlin)
2. "But Beautiful"(music by Jimmy Van Heusen with lyrics by Johnny Burke)
3. "Dear Hearts and Gentle People" (music by Sammy Fain and lyrics by Bob Hilliard)
4. "Sweet Leilani" (words and music by Harry Owens)
5. "Ac-cent-tchu-ate the Positive" (music by Harold Arlen with lyrics by Johnny Mercer)
6. "Swingin' on a Star" (music by Jimmy Van Heusen with lyrics by Johnny Burke)
7. "Pennies From Heaven" (music by Arthur Johnston with lyrics by Johnny Burke)
8. "Too-ra-loo-ra-loo-ra" (words and music by James Royce Shannon)
9. "White Christmas" (words and music by Irving Berlin)
10. "In the Cool, Cool, Cool of the Evening" (music by Hoagy Carmichael with lyrics by Johnny Mercer)

Side Two

1. "If I Could Almost Read Your Mind "(words and music by Ray Charles and Nick Perito)
2. "Till the End of Time" (words and music by Ted Mossman and Buddy Kaye)
3. "Catch a Falling Star "(words and music by Lee Pockriss and Paul Vance)
4. "Round and Round" (words and music by Joe Shapiro and Lou Stallman)
5. "Don't Let the Stars Get In Your Eyes" (words and music by Slim Willet)
6. "You'll Never Walk Alone" (music by Richard Rodgers and lyrics by Oscar Hammerstein II)
7. "You Are Never Far Away From Me" (music by Robert Allen and lyrics by Allan Roberts)
8. "Oh Marie" (Edoardo DiCapua)
9. "It Could Happen To You" (music by Jimmy Van Heusen with lyrics by Johnny Burke)
10. "And I Love You So" (words and music by Don McLean)
11. "It's Impossible" (music by Canache Armando Manzanero and lyrics by Sid Wayne)
12. "Send in the Clowns" (words and music by Stephen Sondheim)

NOTE: Some (not all) cassette tape copies of Perry Como Live on Tour omitted "You Needed Me".
