= I Think of You =

I Think of You may refer to:

- "I Think of You" (1963 song), a popular song written by Peter Lee Stirling
- "I Think of You" (1970 song), a popular song written by Francis Lai and Rod McKuen
- I Think of You (album), a 1971 album by Perry Como, featuring the 1970 song
- "I Think of You", a 1971 song by Rodriguez from his album Coming from Reality
- "I Think of You", a 1973 single by The Detroit Emeralds from their album I'm in Love with You
- "I Think of You", a 2017 song by Jeremih featuring Chris Brown and Big Sean

== See also ==
- "Naħseb Fik" (I Think of You), 2021 single by Aidan
- Think of You (disambiguation)
