= Como's Golden Records =

- 1958 cover

Compilation album by Perry Como
- Released: 1955 (10-inch LP); 1958 (12-inch LP)
- Label: RCA Victor

Perry Como chronology
I Believe (1953)	Como's Golden Records (1955)	So Smooth (1955)

Como's Golden Records is a compilation album by Perry Como released by RCA Victor in late 1954 or early 1955.

According to Billboard, the album's title referred to the fact that the songs it compiled were "Golden Records" — the ones that "sold over a million". It had songs from as early as 1945 and up to one of Como's (then) latest hits – "Wanted".

== Release ==
The album, originally released with a gold cover, compiled eight tracks and was available in two formats: as a 10-inch LP record (cat. no. LPM-3224) and as a double-EP record in a gatefold sleeve (EPB-3224).

In 1958, the album was reissued as a 12-inch LP with a new cover and catalog number, LOP 1007. The new version had 14 tracks, seven on each side. In 1959, the album was reissued again, under revised catalog number LPM-1981; the contents were not changed.

== Reception ==
Professional ratings
Review scores
Source	Rating
Billboard	78/100
AllMusic	(1958 ver.)

Billboard reviewed the 10-inch LP in its issue from 26 February 1955, praising the "attractive gold album cover". "It's a clever packaging idea, and should pay off well in sales," wrote the reviewer, also noting "the liner commentary by Irving Berlin", saying that it enhanced the "prospects of the LP". The album was awarded a rating of 78 points out of 100.

In his retrospective review of the 1958 version for AllMusic, Stephen Cook notes that, although "supplanted by more recent hits roundups on CD, this original RCA package still offers listeners a solid mix of Perry Como's big smashes from the '40s and '50s", giving the album 4 out of 5 possible stars.

== Track listing ==
10-inch LP (RCA Victor LPM-3224)

Side 1
No.	Title	Writer(s)	Artist(s)	Length
1.	"A Hubba-Hubba-Hubba (Dig You Later)" (from the 20th-Century-Fox film Doll Face)	Harold Adamson—Jimmy McHugh	Perry Como with Russ Case and his Orchestra
2.	"Till the End of Time" (based on Chopin's Polonaise)	Buddy Kaye—Ted Mossman	Perry Como with Russ Case and his Orchestra
3.	"Temptation"	Arthur Freed—Nacio Herb Brown	Perry Como with Orchestra directed by Ted Steele
4.	"Prisoner of Love"	Russ Columbo—Leo Robin	Perry Como with Russ Case and his Orchestra

Side 2
No.	Title	Writer(s)	Artist(s)	Length
1.	"When You Were Sweet Sixteen"	James Thornton	Perry Como and the Satisfiers with Lloyd Shaffer and his Orchestra
2.	"Because"	Edward Teschemacher—Guy D'Hardelot	Perry Como with Russ Case and his Orchestra
3.	"Don't Let the Stars Get in Your Eyes"	Willet	Perry Como with the Ramblers
4.	"Wanted"	Jack Fulton—Lois Steele	Perry Como with Hugo Winterhalter's Orchestra and Chorus

=== 1958 version ===
12-inch LP (RCA Victor LOP-1007)

Side 1
No.	Title	Writer(s)	Year	Length
1.	"Don't Let the Stars Get in Your Eyes"	Willet	1952
2.	"Till the End of Time"	Kaye, Mossman	1945
3.	"Prisoner of Love"	Robin, Columbo	1946
4.	"Catch a Falling Star"	Vance, Pockriss	1958
5.	"A Hubba-Hubba-Hubba (Dig You Later)"	Adamson, McHugh	1945
6.	"Temptation"	Brown, Freed	1945
7.	"Papa Loves Mambo"	Hoffman, Manning, Reichner	1954

Side 2
No.	Title	Writer(s)	Year	Length
1.	"Wanted"	Fulton, Steele	1954
2.	"Round and Round"	Stallman, Shapiro	1957
3.	"Because"	Teschemacher, D'Hardelot	1948
4.	"Mi casa, su casa (My House Is Your House)"	Hoffman, Manning	1957
5.	"When You Were Sweet Sixteen"	James Thornton	1947
6.	"Magic Moments"	Bacharach, David	1958
7.	"Hot Diggity (Dog Ziggity Boom)"	Hoffman, Manning	1956
