= Look to Your Heart =

Look to Your Heart may refer to:

- Look to Your Heart (Perry Como album), 1968
- Look to Your Heart (Frank Sinatra album), 1959
