= It's Impossible =

It's Impossible may refer to:

- the 1968 song "Somos Novios", by Armando Manzanero; it was adapted to English and titled "It's Impossible" by Sid Wayne
- It's Impossible, a 1970 album by Perry Como, containing and named after the song
