= Perry (album) =

Studio album by Perry Como
- Released: July 12, 1974
- Recorded: January 4, 7, April 29, May 1, 1974
- Studio: RCA Victor's studio "C"
- Genre: Vocal
- Label: RCA Victor
- Producer: Pete Spargo

Perry Como chronology
And I Love You So (1973)	Perry (1974)	Just Out of Reach (1975)

Perry was Perry Como's 22nd album, released in 1974 by RCA Records.

== Background ==
Whilst Como had declined in the charts, he made a resurgence in 1970 and 1973 with singles like "It's Impossible" and "And I Love You So", both of which topped the Easy Listening chart. Como continued recording in 1974.

== Overview ==
Following the success of "Weave Me the Sunshine", "I Don't Know What He Told You", and a rerecording of his gold record song from 1945, "Temptation", on the Easy Listening charts (Nos. 5, 8 and 28, respectively), Como recorded and released an album, titled after his first name, consisting entirely of cover songs. It was a country-flavored album but with a gentle pop mix.

== Critical reception ==
Cashbox wrote that a "number of 'traditional' artists such as Andy Williams have taken it upon themselves to get into a contemporary bag and Perry has done exactly that with his delightful new LP featuring the renowned vocalist singing his own interpretations of such current standards as 'You Are the Sunshine of My Life,' 'Behind Closed Doors,' 'The Most Beautiful Girl,' 'The Way We Were,' and 'Weave Me the Sunshine.'" The magazine also stated that "Like Williams, Como has succeeded in making every cut a treat to listen to and is to be complimented for his youthful enthusiasm as well as his talent."

== Track listing ==
=== Side one ===
1. "Temptation" (Music by Nacio Herb Brown, lyrics by Arthur Freed)
2. "The Hands of Time" (Music by Michel Legrand, lyrics by Marilyn and Alan Bergman)
3. "You Are the Sunshine of My Life" (Stevie Wonder)
4. "Behind Closed Doors" (Kenny O'Dell)
5. "I Don't Know What He Told You" (Lyrics by Robert I. Allen)

=== Side two ===
1. "That's You" (Juan Carlos Calderón)
2. "The Way We Were" (Music by Marvin Hamlisch, lyrics by Marilyn and Alan Bergman)
3. "The Most Beautiful Girl" (Rory Bourke, Billy Sherrill and Norro Wilson)
4. "Beyond Tomorrow" (Mikis Theodorakis and Larry Kusik)
5. "Weave Me the Sunshine" (Peter Yarrow)

== Charts ==
Perry debuted at No. 28 on the Record & Radio Mirror's Top Fifty chart (later adopted as the UK Albums Chart). By December 1, 1974, Perry had sold 250,000 copies and was certified gold. In the United States, the album reached No. 138 on the Billboard Top LPs & Tape chart.

Chart peaks for And I Love You So
Chart (1974)	Peak position
US Billboard Top LPs & Tape	138
US Cash Box Top 100 Albums	152
UK Albums Chart	28

== Certification ==
Region	Certification	Certified units/sales
United Kingdom (BPI)	Gold	100,000^{^}
^{^} Shipments figures based on certification alone.
