= Love Makes the World Go 'Round =

Love Makes the World Go 'Round may refer to:

- "Love Makes the World Go 'Round" (1896 song), a song with lyrics by Clyde Fitch and arrangement by William Furst
- "Love Makes the World Go 'Round", a 1935 song, music by Dana Suesse, lyrics by Edward Heyman
- "Love Makes the World Go 'Round" (1958 song), a song by Ollie Jones, popularized by Perry Como and The Jets
- "Love Makes the World Go 'Round" (song from Carnival!), a song from the 1961 musical
- "Love Makes the World Go 'Round" (Deon Jackson song), 1965
- "Love Makes the World Go 'Round", a song by The Hollies from Hollies
- "Love Makes the World Go 'Round", a 1986 song by Madonna from True Blue
- "Love Makes the World Go 'Round", a 1989 song by Bruce Willis from If It Don't Kill You, It Just Makes You Stronger
- "Love Makes the World Go 'Round", a song sung by The Powerpuff Girls in the 1999 episode "Mime for a Change"
- Love Makes the World Go Round (album), a 2003 album by Tina Harris
- "Love Makes the World Go 'Round", a 2004 song by Ashlee Simpson from Autobiography

== See also ==
- "Love Make the World Go Round", a 2016 charity single by Jennifer Lopez and Lin-Manuel Miranda
