= Peter (album) =

Studio album by Peter Yarrow
- Released: February 1972
- Studio: Bearsville Studios; A & R Recording
- Genre: Folk; rock; pop
- Label: Warner Bros.
- Producer: Phil Ramone; Milt Okun

Peter Yarrow chronology
Peter (1972)	That's Enough for Me (1973)

Singles from Peter
- 1. "Don't Ever Take Away My Freedom" Released: March, 1972; 2. "Weave Me the Sunshine" Released: April 10, 1972

Peter is the 1972 debut solo studio album by American pop and folk singer-songwriter Peter Yarrow. Released on Warner Bros. Records, the album was produced by Milt Okun and Phil Ramone and was released after the breakup of the folk group Peter, Paul and Mary. The album reflects Yarrow's shift away from folk towards pop and rock, while retaining his anti-war commentary and political activism. The album contained two singles, the second of which, "Weave Me the Sunshine", climbed to No. 25 on the Billboard Easy Listening chart after its debut on it in late May 1972.

== Cover art ==
The cover art for Peter was designed by Milton Glaser.

== Critical reception ==
Professional ratings
Review scores
Source	Rating
AllMusic	4.5/5 stars

The album received positive reviews from music critics. Billboard noted that "Kal Rudman calls it 'album of the year'."

Mike Shearer wrote for The Albuquerque Tribune that the album is a "painfully good album, a personal album ... worth whatever price you find on it".

The Springfield Leader and Press said that "the statements" on the album are "much too personal to be considered folk music". It remarked that "the lyrics are too modern, the chord patterns too complicated, the rhythms too varied."

In an AllMusic album review, Richie Unterberger wrote that the songs "aren't as memorable as the best of Peter, Paul and Mary's" and that "the arrangements can sound odd" when compared to those of the trio, later remarking that the album is "a pleasantly accomplished effort, if a bit tilted toward the gentle and sweet".

== Chart performance ==
Peter did modestly on the US pop album charts, following a sales spike for Warner Bros. Records in early 1972. It debuted on Billboard magazine's Top LP's chart in the issue dated March 3, 1972, peaking at No. 163 during a ten-week run on the chart. The album entered the Cashbox magazine's Top 100 Albums chart in the issue also dated February 23, 1972, peaking at No. 111 during an eleven-week run on it. The album debuted on the Record World Album Chart in the issue dated March 18, 1972, reaching No. 112 and dropping out in May.

== Track listing ==
Peter track listing
No.	Title	Writer(s)	Length
1.	"River of Jordan"	Peter Yarrow	2:51
2.	"Mary Beth"	Elizabeth Yarrow; Peter Yarrow	2:47
3.	"Goodbye Josh"	Peter Yarrow	4:08
4.	"Take Off Your Mask"	Mary Beth McCarthy; Peter Yarrow	3:32
5.	"Wings of Time"	Elizabeth Yarrow; Peter Yarrow	4:10
6.	"Don’t Ever Take Away My Freedom"	Peter Yarrow	4:37
7.	"Side Road"	Peter Yarrow	2:52
8.	"Tall Pine Trees"	Peter Yarrow	3:17
9.	"Greenwood"	Peter Yarrow	3:42
10.	"Beautiful City"	E. Mezzetti; Peter Yarrow	3:15
11.	"Plato’s Song"	E. Mezzetti; Peter Yarrow	2:56
12.	"Weave Me the Sunshine"	Peter Yarrow	4:24
Total length:			45:58

== Charts ==
Weekly chart peaks for Peter
Chart (1972)	Peak position
US Billboard Top LP's & Tape	163
US Cashbox Top 100 Albums	111
US Record World Album Chart	112

== Personnel ==
Composition

- Peter Yarrow – writer
- Elizabeth Yarrow - writer
- Mary Beth McCarthy – writer
- Elaina Mezzetti – writer

Production

- Milt Okun – producer
- Phil Ramone – producer, recording engineer, mixing engineer

=== Vocals and instruments ===
- Peter Yarrow – vocals
- Lazarus – vocals
- Libby Titus – vocals
- Maria Muldaur – vocals
- Stuart Scharf – guitar
- Bruce Langhorne - guitar
- John Simon - piano
- Rod Hicks - bass
- Dominick Cortese - accordion
- Bob Boucher - bass
- Russ Savakus - bass
- Clark Pierson - drums
- Billy Mundi - drums, percussion
- John Till - guitar
- Paul Butterfield - harmonica
- Ken Pearson - organ
- Airto Moreira - percussion
- Edd Kalehoff – synthesizer
