= The Jets (British band) =

British rockabilly band

- Origin: United Kingdom
- Genres: Rockabilly
- Years active: 1978–present
- Labels: EMI, Krypton Records
- Members: Bob Cotton (lead vocals, double bass) Ray Cotton (lead guitar, vocals); Tony Cotton (drums, vocals) Groot Cotton (Band Dog)

The Jets are a British rockabilly band, who had two charting singles in the early 1980s with "Yes Tonight Josephine" and "Love Makes the World Go Round". The songs reached numbers 25 and 21 respectively on the UK Singles Chart. Both tracks featured on their album, 100% Cotton. The band scored six other minor chart entries, all charting within the top 75. The Jets consists of three brothers, Bob Cotton (eldest - double bass and lead vocals), Ray Cotton (middle - lead guitar and lead/backing vocals) and Tony Cotton (youngest - drums and backing vocals).

The band continues to tour the club and rockabilly circuit both in the UK and abroad and is still producing albums.

== Discography ==
=== Albums ===
Year	Album	Label	UK
1981	Jets	EMI	—
1982	100% Cotton	EMI	30
1986	Session Out	Nervous Records	—
1988	Cotton Pickin'	Krypton	—
1989	15 Rockin Years	Krypton	—
1991	All Fired Up	Krypton	—
1993	Turn Up the Guitar	Krypton	—
1995	One for the Road	Krypton	—
1996	Stare Stare Stare	Krypton	—
1998	The Classic Collection	Krypton	—
2002	Bolt of Lightning	Krypton	—
2009	The Singles	Tornado Records	—
2013	Most Wanted Rockin' Up a Storm	Krypton	—
2018	40 Rockin' Years	Krypton	—
"—" denotes releases that did not chart.

=== Singles ===
Year	Song	UK
1978	"Rockabilly Baby"	—
1979	"Sleep Rock 'N' Roll"	—
1981	"Who's That Knocking"	—
1981	"Let's Get It On"	—
1981	"Sugar Doll"	55
1981	"Yes Tonight Josephine"	25
1982	"Love Makes the World Go 'Round"	21
1982	"The Honeydripper"	58
1982	"Somebody to Love"	56
1983	"Blue Skies"	53
1983	"Rockin' Around the Christmas Tree"	62
1984	"Party Doll"	72
1984	"Heatwave"	—
"—" denotes releases that did not chart.
