= Think of You =

Think of You may refer to:

- "Think of You" (Usher song), 1994
- "Think of You" (Whigfield song), 1995
- "Think of You" (Chris Young and Cassadee Pope song), 2016
- "Think of You" (Kettama and Prospa song), 2026
- "Think of You", a song by MS MR from their 2013 album Secondhand Rapture

== See also ==
- I Think of You (disambiguation)
