= Just Out of Reach =

Studio album by Perry Como
- Released: September 1975
- Recorded: January 22, 27, May 27, June 6, 1975
- Studio: RCA's "Nashville Sound" studios
- Genre: Vocal
- Label: RCA Victor
- Producer: Chet Atkins

Perry Como chronology
Perry (1974)	Just Out of Reach (1975)	The Best of British (1977)

Just Out Of Reach is an album by pop singer Perry Como released by RCA Records in 1975. The album features arrangements typical of the classic country style combined with gentle vocals in the style of sung ballads.

== Chart performance ==
The album debuted on Billboard magazine's Top LP's & Tape chart in the issue dated December 20, 1975, peaking at No. 142 during a nine-week run on the chart.

== Track listing ==
Side one
No.	Title	Writer(s)	Length
1.	"Let's Do It Again"	Tony Hatch, Jackie Trent	2:59
2.	"Then You Can Tell Me Goodbye"	John D. Loudermilk	2:40
3.	"Here, There and Everywhere"	John Lennon, Paul McCartney	2:41
4.	"Let It Be Love"	Ben Peters	2:35
5.	"The Grass Keeps Right On Growin'"	Gloria Shayne	3:11

Side two
No.	Title	Writer(s)	Length
6.	"Just Out of Reach"	Virgil F. Stewart	2:45
7.	"Let Me Call You Baby Tonight"	Porter Jordan, Bob Duncan	2:28
8.	"Lovin' Her Was Easier"	Kris Kristofferson	3:10
9.	"Make Love to Life"	James Stein	2:54
10.	"Love Put a Song in My Heart"	Ben Peters	2:50

== Charts ==
Chart (1975-1976)	Peak position
US Billboard Top LPs & Tape	142
