= George David Weiss =

American songwriter and arranger (1921–2010)

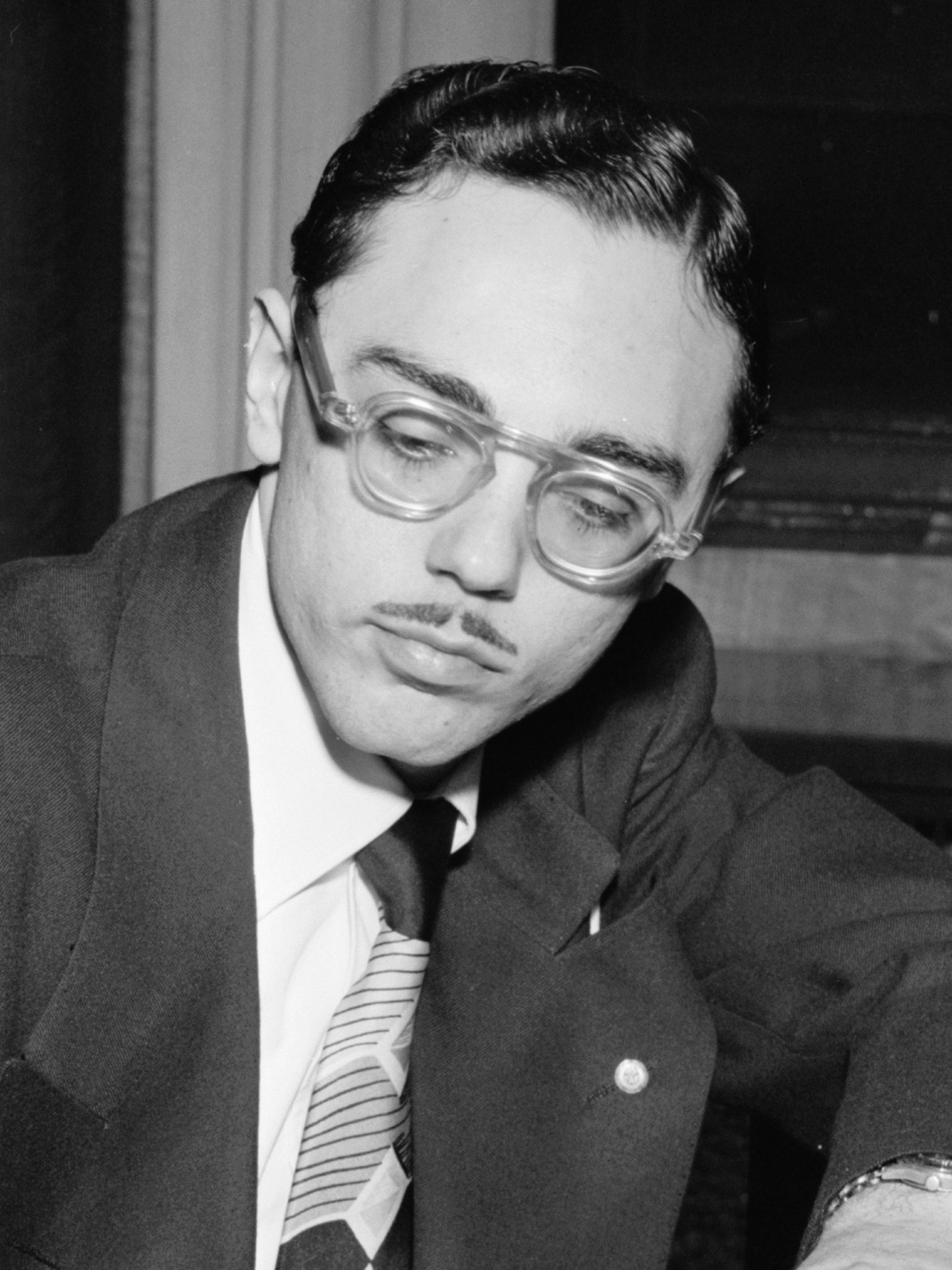
- Weiss in 1947; by William P. Gottlieb

Background information
- Also known as: B. Y. Forster
- Born: April 9, 1921; New York City, U.S.
- Died: August 23, 2010 (aged 89) Oldwick, New Jersey, U.S.
- Genres: Traditional pop; jazz
- Occupations: Songwriter; arranger
- Years active: 1940s–1960s

George David Weiss (April 9, 1921 – August 23, 2010) was an American songwriter and arranger, who was a president of the Songwriters Guild of America.

He is an inductee in the Songwriters Hall of Fame.

== Biography ==
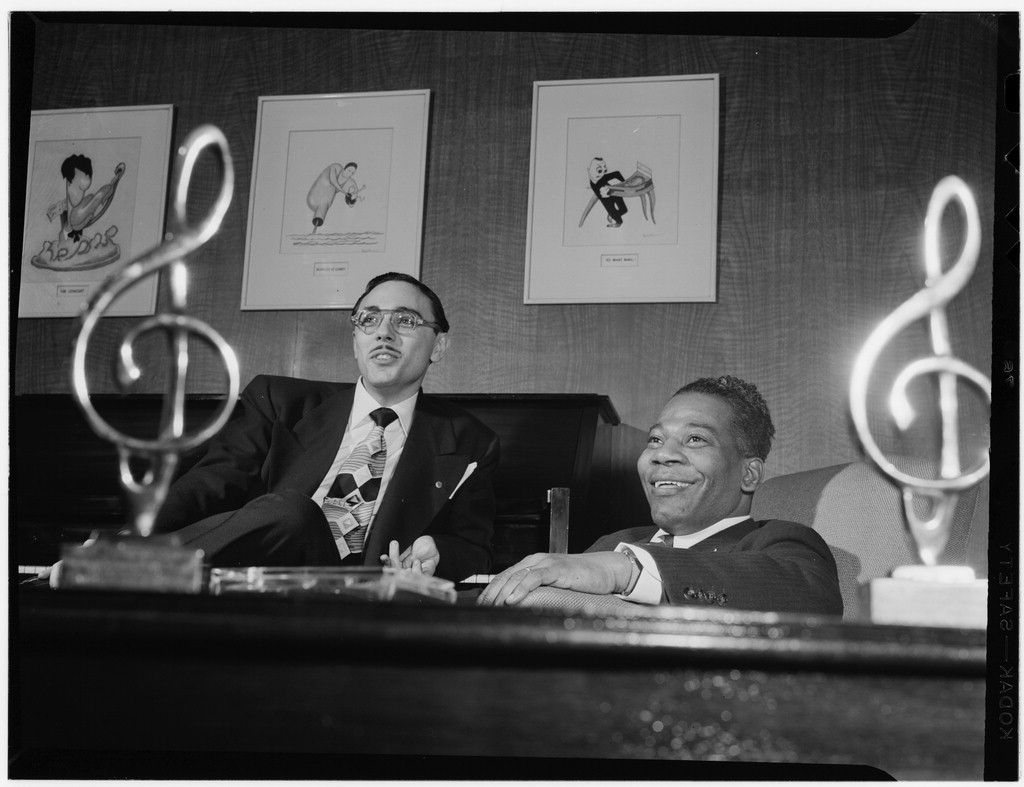
Weiss (left) with Bennie Benjamin in their New York office, 1947; by William P. Gottlieb

Weiss was born in a Jewish family and originally planned a career as a lawyer or accountant; however, out of a love for music, he was led to attend the Juilliard School of Music, developing his skills in writing and arranging. After leaving school, he became an arranger for such big bands as those of Stan Kenton, Vincent Lopez, and Johnny Richards.

He was a prolific songwriter during the 1940s, 1950s, and 1960s, with many of his songs attaining high rankings on the charts. Although he worked with many collaborators, the largest proportion of his well-known songs were written with Bennie Benjamin.

Weiss contributed to a number of film scores: Murder, Inc. (1960), Gidget Goes to Rome (1963), Mediterranean Holiday (1964), and Mademoiselle (1966).

Collaborations on three Broadway musicals were among his compositions. Mr. Wonderful was written in 1956 with Jerry Bock and Lawrence Holofcener. The Broadway production starred Sammy Davis Jr. First Impressions was based on Jane Austen's Pride and Prejudice. It was written in 1959, with Bo Goldman and Glenn Paxton. Maggie Flynn was written in 1968, with Hugo Peretti and Luigi Creatore. It was set in New York during the American Civil War, and the Broadway production starred Shirley Jones and Jack Cassidy. In addition, Weiss and Will Severin composed the family musical, A Tale of Cinderella, which was first presented in December 1994 at the Theater Institute in Troy, New York, and filmed for presentation on PBS.

Weiss wrote the lyrics for the jazz standard "Lullaby of Birdland", which became a hit for Ella Fitzgerald. In 1984, Weiss was inducted into the Songwriters Hall of Fame.

In 2006, a court settlement was reached regarding royalties for the worldwide rights of the song "The Lion Sleeps Tonight" (originally credited only to Weiss, Peretti, and Creatorewhich), based on the 1939 song "Mbube" by the South African musician Solomon Linda. The settlement, which operates worldwide and in settlement of all claims, encompasses the following:

1. Linda's heirs will receive payment for past uses of "The Lion Sleeps Tonight" and an entitlement to future royalties.
2. "The Lion Sleeps Tonight" is acknowledged as derived from "Mbube".
3. Solomon Linda is acknowledged as a co-composer of the song and will be designated as such.
4. A trust will be formed to administer the heirs' copyright and to receive on their behalf the payments due.

== Death ==
Weiss died at age 89 on August 23, 2010, of natural causes at his home in Oldwick, New Jersey.

== Notable songs ==
- "Cross over the Bridge" (1945) – co-written by Bennie Benjamin, recorded by Patti Page
- "Oh! What It Seemed to Be" (1946) – co-written by Bennie Benjamin and Frankie Carle, recorded by Frankie Carle and Frank Sinatra who both took it to #1
- "Lullaby of Birdland" (1952) – under the pseudonym "B. Y. Forster", with music by George Shearing
- "Mr. Wonderful" (1955) – co-written by Jerry Bock and Lawrence Holofcener
- "Mandolins in the Moonlight (1958) – co-written by Aaron Schroeder, recorded by Perry Como
- "Johnny Freedom" (1960) – co-written by Jule Styne, recorded by Johnny Horton
- "The Lion Sleeps Tonight" (1961) – originally written by Solomon Linda in 1939; lyrics rewritten in 1961 by Weiss, Luigi Creatore, and Hugo Peretti; recorded by The Tokens
- "Can't Help Falling in Love" (1961) – co-written by Luigi Creatore and Hugo Peretti, recorded by Elvis Presley
- "Wild in the Country" (1961) – co-written by Luigi Creatore and Hugo Peretti, recorded by Elvis Presley for the movie of the same name
- "That Sunday, That Summer" (1963) – co-written by Joe Sherman
- "Stay With Me" (1966) – co-written by Jerry Ragovoy, recorded by Lorraine Ellison
- "What a Wonderful World" (1968) – co-written by Bob Thiele, recorded by Louis Armstrong
- "Let's Put It All Together" (1974) – co-written by Luigi Creatore and Hugo Peretti, recorded by The Stylistics
