= Relaxing with Perry Como =

Compilation album by Perry Como
- Released: 1956
- Label: RCA Victor

Perry Como chronology
So Smooth (1955)	Relaxing with Perry Como (1956)	We Get Letters (1957)

Professional ratings
Review scores
Source	Rating
AllMusic	3/5 stars

Relaxing with Perry Como is an album by Perry Como released by RCA Victor in 1956.

== Release and reception ==
The album was a 12-inch LP repackage of two older 10-inch LP releases: it compiled the 1952 eight-song 10-inch-LP version of Como's album Supper Club Favorites with four songs from his 1952 10-inch LP TV Favorites.

In his retrospective review for AllMusic, William Ruhlmann noted that the compilation "didn't make much sense thematically". He also added that the title didn't "mean anything", cause on those tracks Como was "working up quite a sweat" and was "not relaxing at all". Yet, he concluded that, regardless of this, the album still contained "some of Como's biggest hits and his treatments of some well-known older songs" and gave it 3 out of 5 possible stars.

== Track listing ==
12-inch LP (RCA Victor LPM 1176)

Side 1
No.	Title	Writer(s)	Note(s)	Length
1.	"Prisoner of Love"	Robin–Gaskill–Columbo	with Russ Case and his Orch.
2.	"Because"	Edward Teschemacher—Guy D'Hardelot
3.	"When You Were Sweet Sixteen"	James Thornton	with Lloyd Shaffer and his Orch, and The Satisfiers
4.	"Far Away Places"	Kramer–Whitney	with Henri René and his Orch.
5.	"Black Moonlight"	Arthur Johnston—Sam Coslow	with Mitchell Ayres and his Orch.
6.	"While We're Young"	Wilder–Palitz–Engvick	with Mitchell Ayres and his Orch. and Chorus

Side 2
No.	Title	Writer(s)	Note(s)	Length
1.	"Song of Songs"	Clarence Lucas—Moya	with Lloyd Shaffer and his Orch.
2.	"Till the End of Time" (based on Chopin's Polonaise)	Buddy Kaye—Ted Mossman	with Russ Case and his Orch.
3.	"Temptation"	Arthur Freed—Nacio Herb Brown	with Ted Steele and his Orch.
4.	"If"	Evans–Hargreaves–Damerell	with Mitchell Ayres and his Orch.
5.	"If There Is Someone Lovelier than You"	Howard Dietz—Arthur Schwartz	with Mitchell Ayres and his Orch.
6.	"Over the Rainbow"	E. Y. Harburg—H. Arlen	with Mitchell Ayres and his Orch.
