= Perry Como in Person at the International Hotel, Las Vegas =

Perry Como In Person

Live album by Perry Como
- Released: August 1970
- Recorded: June 25, 26, 27, 1970
- Genre: Vocal
- Label: RCA Victor
- Producer: Ernie Altschuler.

Perry Como chronology
Seattle (1969)	Perry Como In Person (1970)	It's Impossible (1970)

Perry Como in Person at the International Hotel, Las Vegas is a 1970 album by Perry Como, his 18th 12" long-play album released by RCA Records and his first live album. These recordings were produced from Como's concerts at the International Hotel, his first concerts since his 1966 summer tour.

== Track listing ==
Side One

1. "I've Got You Under My Skin" (Words and Music by Cole Porter)
2. "Hello Young Lovers" (Music by Richard Rodgers and lyrics by Oscar Hammerstein II)
3. "Everybody's Talking" (Words and Music by Fred Neil)
4. "If I Had a Hammer" (Music and lyrics Lee Hays and Pete Seeger)
5. "Without a Song" (Music by Vincent Youmans and lyrics by Billy Rose and Edward Eliscu)
6. "If I Could Almost Read Your Mind" (Words and Music by Ray Charles and Nick Perito)
7. "Prisoner of Love" (Music by Russ Columbo and Clarence Gaskill with lyrics by Leo Robin)

Side Two

1. Informal talk
2. "The Father of Girls" (Words and Music by Ervin M. Drake)
3. "Love is Spreading Over the World" (Music by Neil Sedaka and lyrics by Howard Greenfield)
4. "When You Were Sweet Sixteen" (Words and Music by James Thornton)
5. "O Marenariello" (Arranged and adapted by Ray Charles and Nick Perito)
6. "It's A Good Day" (Words and Music by Peggy Lee and Dave Barbour)
7. "You'll Never Walk Alone" (Music by Richard Rodgers and lyrics by Oscar Hammerstein II)
8. "You Are Never Far Away" (Music by Robert Allen and lyrics by Allan Roberts)
