= Where You're Concerned =

Studio album by Perry Como
- Released: March 1978
- Genre: Vocal
- Label: RCA Victor

Perry Como chronology
The Best of British (1977)	Where You're Concerned (1978)	Perry Como (1980)

Where You're Concerned is the 25th album by Perry Como, released by RCA Records in 1978. Recorded in sessions in the U.K. and the U.S., it shares most of its tracks with Perry's album, The Best of British. This album was made for U.S. release only, as The Best of British was offered for sale only in the U.K. and Canada.

== Track listing ==
Side One

1. "You Light Up My Life" (Joe Brooks)
2. "There's a Kind of Hush" (David Leslie Reed, Geoff Stevens)
3. "Feelings" (music by Mauricio Kaiserman, Portuguese lyrics by Thomas Fundera, English lyrics by Morris Albert)
4. "When I Need You" (music by Albert Hammond, lyrics by Carole Bayer Sager)
5. "Where You're Concerned" (Nancy Goland)

Side Two

1. "Girl You Make It Happen" (Warner Alfred Wilder)
2. "Greensleeves" (Traditional; arranged by Ray Charles and Nick Perito)
3. "My Kind of Girl" (Leslie Bricusse)
4. "Someday I'll Find You" (Noël Coward)
5. "We'll Meet Again" (music by Albert R. Parker, lyrics by Hugh Charles)
