= So It Goes (Perry Como album) =

Studio album by Perry Como
- Released: April 1983
- Recorded: December 10, 11, 1978, December 1981–1982
- Genre: Traditional pop
- Label: RCA Victor
- Producer: Mike Berniker, Nick Perito

Perry Como chronology
Perry Como Live On Tour (1981)	So It Goes (1983)	Today (1987)

So It Goes, sometimes called So It Goes - Goodbye For Now, is a 1983 album by Perry Como, his 28th and penultimate such release for RCA Records.

== Track listing ==
Side one

1. "What's One More Time" (music and lyrics by Richard Leigh)
2. "So It Goes" (music and lyrics by John Barry Mason, Alec Gould and Michael Heath Johnson)
3. "Here Comes That Song Again" (Words and Music by Bill Zerface, Jim Zerface and Bob Morrison)
4. "Goodbye for Now" (theme from Reds; music and lyrics by Stephen Sondheim)
5. "The Second Time" (music by Francis Lai and lyrics by Tim Rice)

Side two

1. "Jason" (music and lyrics by Debbie Hupp and Bob Morrison)
2. "As My Love For You" (music and lyrics by George Fischoff)
3. "Fancy Dancer" (music and lyrics by Harry Manfredini and John Briggs)
4. "Is She the Only Girl in the World" (music and lyrics by Irving Berlin)
5. "You Are So Beautiful" (music and lyrics by Billy Preston and Bruce Fisher)
