= And I Love You So (Perry Como album) =

Studio album by Perry Como
- Released: August 17, 1973
- Recorded: December 19, 1972, January 16, 19, April 4, 1973
- Studio: RCA's "Nashville Sound" studios, Nashville, Tennessee
- Genre: Soft rock, traditional pop, easy listening
- Label: RCA Victor
- Producer: Chet Atkins

Perry Como chronology
I Think of You (1972)	And I Love You So (1973)	Perry (1974)

Professional ratings
Review scores
Source	Rating
Allmusic	3/5 stars

And I Love You So is the 21st long-play album by Perry Como, released by RCA Records in 1973.

== Background ==
As with It's Impossible, this album was issued to feature a surprise hit single, Don McLean's "And I Love You So". Como brought the song to the national top 40 (Number One Easy Listening). Previous versions of the song by Bobby Goldsboro and Bobby Vinton had met with mild or no success. Como's version was so successful, RCA asked him to record the song in Spanish. When Como said he did not speak the language, he received personal Spanish lessons from the head of RCA International to get the record made.

== Overview ==
As on previous Como LPs, this collection features selections from then contemporary recording artists such as Roberta Flack, The Carpenters, Ray Price, Tony Orlando and Dawn, Bread and Mac Davis. The album was among the last to be produced by Chet Atkins before he stepped down from his executive position at RCA's Nashville studios. The album sold well, reaching No. 1 in the UK, selling 300,000 copies and getting certified Platinum, and was certified gold in Australia.

== Track listing ==
Side one

1. "And I Love You So" (Words and music by Don McLean) - 3:18
2. "Killing Me Softly With Her Song" (Music by Charles Fox, lyrics by Norman Gimbel) - 4:29
3. "For the Good Times" (Words and music by Kris Kristofferson) - 3:38
4. "Aubrey" (Words and music by David Gates) - 3:34
5. "Sing" (Words and music by Joe Raposo) - 2:40

Side two

1. "I Want to Give" (Lyrics By Gene Nash) - 3:04
2. "Tie a Yellow Ribbon Round the Ole Oak Tree" (Music by L. Russell Brown, lyrics by Irwin Levine) - 3:02
3. "I Thought About You" (Words and music by Ronald E. McCown) - 2:16
4. "It All Seems to Fall Into Line" (Music by Ben Weisman, lyrics by Al Stillman) - 2:51
5. "I Believe in Music" (Words and music by Mac Davis) - 2:56

== Charts ==
=== Weekly charts ===
Chart (1973–75)	Peak position
UK Albums (OCC)	1
US Billboard Top LPs & Tape	34
US Cashbox Top 100 Albums	27

=== Year-end charts ===
Chart (1975)	Position
UK Albums (OCC)	40

== Certifications ==
Region	Certification	Certified units/sales
Australia (ARIA)	Gold	20,000^{^}
United Kingdom (BPI)	Platinum	300,000^{^}
^{^} Shipments figures based on certification alone.

== Personnel ==
- Vocals: Perry Como
- Recording engineer: Tom Pick
- Recording technicians: Roy Shockley and Milton Henderson
- Arrangers: Bergen White and Cam Mullins
