= Weave Me the Sunshine =

Song by Peter Yarrow

Single by Perry Como

from the album Perry
- B-side: "I Don't Know What He Told You"
- Released: 1974
- Genre: Adult contemporary
- Length: 2:42
- Label: Victor Records
- Songwriter: Peter Yarrow
- Producer: Pete Spargo

Perry Como singles chronology
"I Want to Give" (1974)	"Weave Me the Sunshine" (1974)	"Temptation" (1974)

"Weave Me the Sunshine" is a song written by Peter Yarrow, and was first released by Peter Yarrow in 1972. The song was also covered by Peter, Paul and Mary and released on their 1986 album No Easy Walk to Freedom.

== Peter Yarrow version ==
The first release was by Peter Yarrow in 1972. It peaked at No. 25 on the Billboard Easy Listening chart, and stayed on it for 4 weeks. It was his only solo-single charting release.

== Perry Como version ==
=== Background and release ===
After a resurgence to the charts in the early 1970s, with songs like "It's Impossible" and "And I Love You So" topping the Adult Contemporary chart, Como's recording career seemed back on track.. In 1974 he decided to record "Weave Me the Sunshine", and his version peaked at No. 5 on the Billboard Adult Contemporary chart and stayed on the chart for 14 weeks. The B-side was ranked lower, but stayed on the chart longer, at 15 weeks and peaked at No. 8. Both songs were included in his Perry album that year.

=== Reception ===
The single received a positive reception upon its release. Record World reviewed the single in early May, and talking about the flip noted that "Straight MOR fare is handled with Como's ease." Also saying that with Como's recent reappearance on various television specials it could be another hit like "It's Impossible". Cashbox reviewed the single in mid May, writing, "From the pen of Peter Yarrow comes this fine artist's latest single release that should generate some strong pop and MOR play. Fine cover of the song Yarrow recorded which features a sunshiny lyric perfect for these Summertime months. Listeners should feel the same way. Could be a smash for Perry."
