= Mandolins in the Moonlight =

Popular song performed by Perry Como in 1958

"Mandolins in the Moonlight" is a popular song, written by George David Weiss and Aaron Schroeder.

== Perry Como recording ==
It was recorded by Perry Como on September 16, 1958, and released by RCA Victor Records as a 45 rpm single, catalog numbers 47-7353 (mono) and 61-7353 (stereo). It reached number 47 on the Billboard chart.

Outside, the US, the United Kingdom RCA label released the recording as a 78 rpm single, catalog number 1086. This recording charted in the UK at number 13, in Germany at number 13, in Belgium at number 1, and in Italy at number 4. In Japan, the recording was released as a stereo 45 rpm single by RCA as catalog number SX-1002. In France, it was released by RCA as catalog number 45-326. The flip side on the US, UK, and Japanese releases was "Love Makes the World Go 'Round", but on the French release, it was "Glendora".

== Chart performance ==
Chart (1959)	Peak position
Belgium (Ultratop 50 Flanders)	1
Belgium (Ultratop 50 Wallonia)	14
Netherlands (Single Top 100)	2
UK Singles (OCC)	13
US Billboard Hot 100	47
