= Perry Como (album) =

Studio album by Perry Como
- Released: July 1980
- Recorded: April 8–17, 1980
- Genres: Vocal pop, easy listening
- Label: RCA Victor
- Producer: Mike Berniker

Perry Como chronology
Where You're Concerned (1978)	Perry Como (1980)	Perry Como Live On Tour (1981)

Professional ratings
Review scores
Source	Rating
Allmusic	3/5 stars

Perry Como was Perry Como's 26th LP album for RCA Records, released in 1980.

== Track listing ==
Side One

1. "Not While I'm Around" (Stephen Sondheim)
2. "Regrets" (Barbara Wyrick)
3. "When" (George Fischoff)
4. "There'll Never Be Another Night Like This" (David Reilly, Anthony Bygraves)
5. "Love" (Gerard Kenny)

Side Two

1. "When She Smiles" (Jerry Liliedahl)
2. "The Colors of My Life" (Music by Cy Coleman, lyrics by Michael Stewart)
3. "Save Me the Dance" (Music by Luciano Angeleri, lyrics by Ervin M. Drake)
4. "Someone is Waiting" (Richard Ahlert, Ettore Stratta)
5. "You Are My World" (Paul Vance, Bobby London)
