= Today (Perry Como album) =

Studio album by Perry Como
- Released: May 1987
- Recorded: February 1987
- Genre: Vocal pop
- Label: RCA Victor
- Producers: Mike Berniker, Nick Perito

Perry Como chronology
Perry Como, So It Goes / Goodbye for Now (1983)	Today (1987)	Perry Como's Christmas Concert (1994)

Today is the 29th studio album by Perry Como. It was his final album for RCA Records after 44 years with the label and of his 55-year music career. This is also the penultimate recording ever made by Perry Como, the last being for a Christmas television special in 1994. This album is also significant in that it was the first and only album of Como's career to be released contemporaneously in both vinyl LP format and compact disc.

The song "Wind Beneath My Wings" was recorded for the album in 1987, two years before it was a hit for Bette Midler. It was meant to be somewhat autobiographical. Como also sang this song some 5 years earlier as a tribute to his idol, Bing Crosby. Como wanted to release the song as a single, but RCA declined; Reportedly, Como was so upset that he vowed never to record for RCA again.

== Track listing ==
Side One

1. "Making Love to You" (music by Nick Perito, lyrics by Sammy Cahn)
2. "Sing Along with Me" (music by Nick Perito and lyrics by Dee Williams)
3. "Tonight I Celebrate My Love for You" (music by Michael Masser and lyrics by Gerry Goffin)
4. "Butterfly" (music by L. Russell Brown and lyrics by Irwin Levine)
5. "Bless the Beasts and the Children" (words and music by Barry De Vorzon and Perry Botkin, Jr.)
6. "That's What Friends Are For" (music by Burt Bacharach and lyrics by Carole Bayer Sager)

Side Two

1. "The Wind Beneath My Wings" (words and music by Larry Henley and Jeff Silbar)
2. "I'm Dreaming of Hawaii" (music by Nick Perito and lyrics by Jennifer L. Perito and Dick Williams)
3. "Do You Remember Me" (music by Nick Perito and lyrics by Richard B. Matheson)
4. "My Heart Stood Still" (music by Richard Rodgers and lyrics by Lorenz Hart)
5. "You're Nearer" (music by Richard Rodgers and lyrics by Lorenz Hart)
6. "The Best of Times" (words and music by Jerry Herman)
