= I Don't Know What He Told You =

1974 song by Perry Como

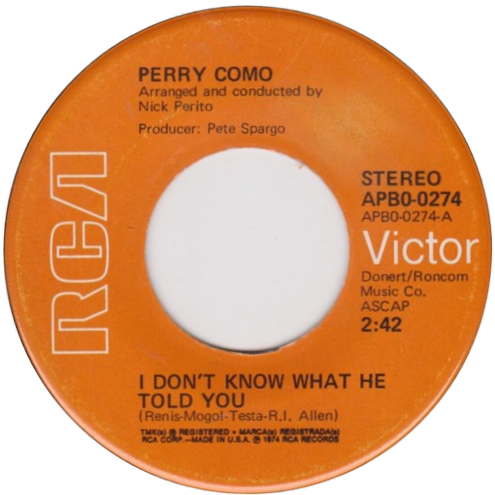

Single by Perry Como

from the album Perry
- B-side: "Weave Me The Sunshine"
- Released: 1974
- Genre: Pop
- Length: 2:42
- Label: RCA
- Songwriters: Giulio Rapetti; Elio Cesari; Alberto Testa; Robert I. Allen (English lyrics)
- Producer: Pete Spargo

"I Don't Know What He Told You" is a song written by Giulio Rapetti, Elio Cesari and Alberto Testa, with English lyrics by Robert I. Allen.

Recorded in 1974 by American singer Perry Como with a runtime of 2:42, the RCA Victor Records release peaked at No. 8 on the Billboard Easy Listening chart. Como also made a 1973 recording of this song under the title "He Couldn't Love You More".

Record World reviewed the single on May 4, 1974, and noted that the "Straight MOR fare is handled with Como's ease." Also saying that with Como's recent reappearance on various television specials could make it another hit like "It's Impossible".
