= So Smooth =

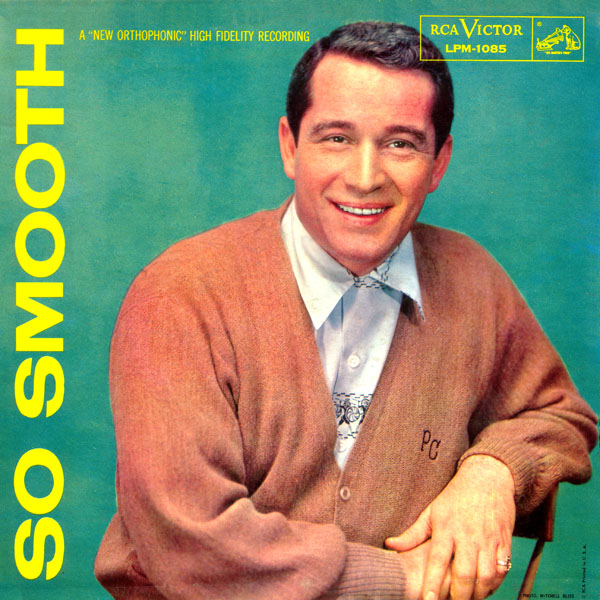

Studio album by Perry Como
- Released: September 1955
- Recorded: January 20, 25, February 8, 17, 1955
- Genre: Vocal
- Length: 33:11
- Label: RCA Victor

Perry Como chronology
Como's Golden Records (1955)	So Smooth (1955)	Relaxing with Perry Como (1956)

Professional ratings
Review scores
Source	Rating
AllMusic	4/5 stars

So Smooth is Perry Como's first RCA Victor 12" long-play album, recorded and originally released in 1955. It successfully reached the pop top-10 in the US.

== Overview ==
So Smooth was Como's first album recorded at Webster Hall in New York City, and his first album with the Ray Charles Singers who would support him generally throughout the remainder of his recording career. So Smooth was released in the UK as We Get Letters Volume 2 as his popularity gained international appeal during the late 1950s. Under this title, the album peaked at number 4 in the Record Mirror albums chart, entering on 28 June 1958 and spending seven weeks within the top five.

Although RCA Victor issued several LP collections by Como prior to this album, this was Como's first album of all-new material recorded especially for an LP release. Como viewed the LP format differently from the singles market, eschewing the kind of popular novelty songs he often recorded for single releases on the 45 and 78 RPM format in favor of collections devoted to well-known standards mostly dating back to the 1930s and 1940s.

All selections were arranged by Joe Lipman.

== Chart performance ==
The album reached No. 7 on the Best-Selling Pop LP's chart, staying on it for ten weeks. It climbed to No. 5 on the Cashbox Top 15 Best-Selling Albums during a thirty-week run on it.

== Track listing ==
Side one

1. "It's a Good Day" (Words and music by Peggy Lee and Dave Barbour) – 1:43
2. "As Time Goes By" (Words and music by Herman Hupfeld) – 3:12
3. "I've Got the World on a String" (Words and music by Harold Arlen and Ted Koehler) – 2:21
4. "My Funny Valentine" (Words and music by Richard Rodgers and Lorenz Hart) – 2:44
5. "For Me and My Gal" (Words and music by George W. Meyer, Edgar Leslie and E. Ray Goetz) – 2:33
6. "I Gotta Right to Sing the Blues" (Words and music by Harold Arlen and Ted Koehler) – 2:47

Side two

1. "Breezin' Along with the Breeze" (Words and music by Haven Gillespie, Seymour Simons and Richard Whiting) – 2:17
2. "It's the Talk of the Town" (Words and music by Jerry Livingston and Marty Symes with Al J. Neiburg) – 3:40
3. "You Do Something to Me" (Words and music by Cole Porter) – 1:54
4. "It Happened in Monterey" (Words and music by Mabel Wayne and William Rose) – 3:03
5. "One for My Baby and One More for the Road" (Words and music by Harold Arlen and Johnny Mercer) – 3:43
6. "In The Still of the Night" (Words and music by Cole Porter) – 2:45

== Charts ==
Weekly chart peaks for So Smooth
Chart (1955)	Peak position
UK Record Mirror Official Album Chart	4
US Billboard Best-Selling Pop LP's	7
US Cashbox Top 15 Best-Selling Albums	5
