= Seattle (album) =

Studio album by Perry Como
- Released: May 1969
- Recorded: June 23, 1965, June 2, August 22, 24, 1967, June 5, 7, October 7, 10, 1968
- Genre: Vocal
- Label: RCA Victor
- Producer: Andy Wiswell and Chet Atkins

Perry Como chronology
Look to Your Heart (1968)	Seattle (1969)	Perry Como in Person at the International Hotel, Las Vegas (1970)

Professional ratings
Review scores
Source	Rating
AllMusic	1.5/5 stars
The Encyclopedia of Popular Music	3/5 stars

Seattle is Perry Como's 17th 12" long-play album released by RCA Records.

== Background and content ==
The title track was Como's first Top 40 single in four years; RCA wanted to issue an album featuring the hit single, so this album was compiled consisting mostly of unreleased material from recording sessions held during the previous three years. This was Como's first true attempt at a contemporary 1960s sound. The album's opening track, "Happiness Comes, Happiness Goes", features distorted guitars and swirling organs.

== Reception ==
The initial Cashbox review stated that Como's "latest album is sure to please his many fans and rack up nice spins and sales." They said that "The chanter's at the top of his form on the set as he lends his smooth voice to a host of new ballads and toe-tappers, and the LP is a fitting addition to his large catalog."

== Chart performance ==
Seattle debuted on Billboard magazine's Top LP's chart in the issue dated June 21, 1969, peaking at No. 93 during an eleven-week run on the chart. The album debuted on Cashbox magazine's Top 100 Albums chart in the issue dated June 14, 1969, being ranked higher at No. 64 during an eight-week run on the chart. The album debuted on Record World magazine's 100 Top LP's chart in the issue dated June 21, 1969, peaking at No. 62 during an eight-week run on the chart.

== Track listing ==
Side One

1. "Happiness Comes, Happiness Goes" (Words and music by Al Stillman and Dick Manning)
2. "Nobody But You" (Words and music by Dion O'Brien)
3. "Seattle" (Music by Hugo Montenegro, and words by Ernie Sheldon and Jack Keller)
4. "Turnaround" (Words and music by Alan Green, Harry Belafonte and Malvina Reynolds)
5. "Beady Eyed Buzzard" (Words and music by Eddie Snyder and Richard Ahlert)
6. "Hearts Will Be Hearts" (Words and music by Cindy Walker)

Side Two

1. "That's All This Old World Needs" (Words and music by Bob Tubert and Demetriss Tapp)
2. "Together Forever" (Music by Harvey Schmidt and lyrics by Tom Jones)
3. "Sunshine Wine" (Words and music by Cindy Walker)
4. "Deep In Your Heart" (Words and music by Jan Crutchfield)
5. "Buongiorno Teresa" (Words and music by Dick Manning and Jimmy Lytell)

== Charts ==
Chart peaks for Seattle
Chart (1969)	Peak position
US Billboard 200 Top LPs	93
US Cashbox Top 100 Albums	64
US Record World 100 Top LP's	62
