= The Best of British =

Studio album by Perry Como
- Released: August 1977
- Recorded: June 6–10, 1977
- Studio: Olympic Studios, Barnes
- Genre: Vocal
- Label: RCA Records

Perry Como chronology
A Legendary Performer (1975)	The Best of British (1977)	Where You're Concerned (1978)

Best Of British is an album by Perry Como released in 1977 by RCA Records in the UK and Canada only. The comparable US Como album, Where You're Concerned, was issued in the US in 1978; the two albums share seven tracks.

== Track listing ==
Side One

1. "My Kind of Girl" (words and music by Leslie Bricusse) +
2. "Greensleeves" (Traditional; arranged by Ray Charles and Nick Perito) +
3. "Michelle" (words and music by John Lennon and Paul McCartney)
4. "A Nightingale Sang in Berkeley Square" (music by Manning Sherwin and lyrics by Eric Maschwitz)
5. "Someday I'll Find You" (words and music by Noël Coward) +
6. "Where You're Concerned" (Words and Music by Nancy Goland) +

Side Two

1. "There's a Kind of Hush" (words and music by David Leslie Reed and Geoff Stevens) +
2. "Where is Love?" (words and music by Lionel Bart)
3. "The Other Man's Grass is Always Greener" (words and music by Tony Hatch and Jackie Trent)
4. "Smile" (music by Charles Chaplin and lyrics by John Turner and Geoffrey Parsons)
5. "The Very Thought of You" (words and music by Ray Noble)
6. "We'll Meet Again" (music by Ross Parker and lyrics by Hughie Charles) +
7. "Girl You Make It Happen" (Words and Music by Warner Alfred Wilder) +

+ Also on the Where You're Concerned album of 1978.
