= I Believe (Perry Como album) =

- 1958 cover

Studio album by Perry Como
- Released: 1953 (10-inch LP); 1958 (12-inch LP)
- Genres: Gospel; vocal
- Label: RCA Victor

Perry Como chronology
Around the Christmas Tree (1953)	I Believe (1953)	Como's Golden Records (1955)

I Believe, subtitled Songs of All Faiths Sung by Perry Como with Hugo Winterhalter and His Orchestra and the Ray Charles Chorus, is an album by Perry Como released by RCA Victor in late 1953 or early 1954.

== Release ==
The album was originally released on a 10-inch LP record (catalog number LPM 3188) and contained eight tracks. In 1956, it was re-issued on a 12-inch LP with a new cover and catalog number, LPM 1172. The new version had 12 tracks, six on each side. In 1975, I Believe was reissued in the lower priced RCA "Pure Gold" album series with new cover art and new catalog number, ANL1-1137(e).

== Reception ==
Professional ratings
Review scores
Source	Rating
Billboard	75/100
Cashbox	Positive

Billboard reviewed the album for its "Packaged record review ratings" column, giving it 75 points out of possible 100, which indicated good "commercial potential within its own musical category ('Vocal')". Cashbox magazine said that "Each number is presented with the utmost of feeling and ranks at the top of his list of sincere interpretations."

== Track listing ==
10-inch LP (RCA Victor LPM 3188)

Side 1
No.	Title	Length
1.	"I Believe"
2.	"Onward, Christian Soldiers"
3.	"Goodnight, Sweet Jesus"
4.	"Act of Contrition"

Side 2
No.	Title	Length
1.	"Eli, Eli"
2.	"Kol Nidrei"
3.	"Nearer, My God, to Thee"
4.	"Abide with Me"

=== 1956 version ===
12-inch LP (RCA Victor LPM 1172)

Side 1
No.	Title	Length
1.	"I Believe"	3:18
2.	"Onward, Christian Soldiers"	3:23
3.	"Goodnight, Sweet Jesus"	2:30
4.	"Act of Contrition"	2:20
5.	"Ave Maria"	4:40
6.	"The Rosary"	3:00

Side 2
No.	Title	Length
1.	"Eli, Eli"	3:58
2.	"Kol Nidrei"	3:56
3.	"Nearer, My God, to Thee"	2:37
4.	"Abide with Me"	2:45
5.	"The Lord's Prayer"	2:52
6.	"Bless This House"	2:50

== Charts ==
Chart peaks for I Believe by Perry Como
Chart (1954)	Peak position
US Billboard Best-Selling Popular Albums – LPs	6
US Billboard Best-Selling Popular Albums – EPs	6
US Billboard Best-Selling Popular Albums	12
