= Round and Round (Shapiro/Stallman song) =

Song

"Round and Round" is a popular song by Joe Shapiro and Lou Stallman published in 1956. A version of the song was recorded by Perry Como for RCA Victor on January 15, 1957 and was a big hit that year.

== Background ==
Como's version was noted for its instrumental buildup, with Mitchell Ayres and His Orchestra, including the counterpoint melodies sung by the Ray Charles Singers, who gradually join in on the refrains, and gradually drop out before the song's fade.

== Chart performance ==
The song would prove to be Perry Como's last over-all number one on the Billboard charts. The song spent two weeks at number two on Billboard's Honor Roll of Hits. In Canada the song was ranked number 15 on the first CHUM Chart.

== Cover versions ==
- This song was recorded by Anne Murray in 1993 for her Croonin' album but it was only released as a bonus track for a special version of her "Croonin'" LP that was released by Heartland Records (1994). Anne Murray said she was always a huge fan of Perry Como and she had appeared with him in Perry Como's Lake Tahoe Holiday on October 28, 1975. The mass market release of "Croonin'" has Anne singing Perry's hit "Wanted".
- UK singer Jimmy Young also covered "Round and Round" in the UK in 1957 and it charted briefly.
- The song was also covered by Norwegian singer Nora Brockstedt and Jens Book-Jenssen in 1957
- Rosemary Clooney (UA single 50076, released in 1966) (Rosemary Clooney discography).
- The song was covered by Sia on the deluxe edition of her album Everyday Is Christmas in November 2018.

== Popular culture ==
- Como's version was featured in the 1999 motion picture Blast from the Past
- The song was also heard at the end of Episode 1 of Karl Pilkington's The Moaning of Life.
- The cover by Sia was featured in a television ad for Target.
- The cover by Perry Como was featured in a television ad for Lindt Chocolate.
- The Perry Como version is also in "Malcolm X" (1993) playing in the background on a radio when Malcolm is in a police precinct conversing with Desk Sergeant over the status of a fellow Muslim.
