= I Think of You (album) =

Studio album by Perry Como
- Released: June 1971
- Recorded: January 14, February 10, April 26, 27, 29, 30, 1971
- Genre: Vocal pop
- Label: RCA Victor
- Producer: Don Costa

Perry Como chronology
It's Impossible (1970)	I Think of You (1971)	And I Love You So (1973)

I Think of You is the 20th long-play album by Perry Como, released by RCA Records.

== Background and content ==
The single "I Think of You", came after his top ten hit "It's Impossible", and it reached No. 53 in the US, doing better on the AC chart, reaching No. 5 there, after that an album with the same name followed. This album continues the formula of the previous LP release by including a majority selection of soft pop/rock from the charts of 1970-1971 by artists such as Simon and Garfunkel, Glen Campbell, The Carpenters, Bread, Lobo, and Ocean.

== Chart performance ==
The album debuted on Billboard magazine's Billboard Top LPs chart in the issue dated June 26, 1971, peaking at No. 101 during a nine-week run on the chart. It was ranked higher by Cashbox, where it peaked at No. 93 during an eight-week run.

== Reception ==
A review from The Gramophone said of this album, "Mr. Como takes a vocal look at songs which have been hits in recent months for other artists ... In fact, he makes every song his own with an effortless facility possessed by very few artists, and the LP is an undiluted pleasure from beginning to end."

== Track listing ==
=== Side one ===
1. "Me and You and a Dog Named Boo" (Words and music by Kent LaVoie)
2. "If" (Words and music by David Gates)
3. "Yesterday I Heard the Rain" (Music by Canache Armando Manzanero, lyrics by Gene Lees)
4. "Dream Baby (How Long Must I Dream)" (Words and music by Cindy Walker)
5. "Where Do I Begin" (Music by Francis Lai, lyrics by Carl Sigman)
6. "I Think of You" (Music by Francis Lai, lyrics by Rod McKuen)

=== Side two ===
1. "Someone Who Cares" (Words and music by Alex Harvey)
2. "For All We Know" (Music by Fred Karlin, lyrics by Arthur James and Robb Wilson)
3. "Put Your Hand In The Hand" (Words and music by Gene MacLellan)
4. "My Days of Loving You" (Words and music by Eddie Snyder and Richard Ahlert)
5. "Bridge over Troubled Water" (Words and music by Paul Simon)

== Charts ==
Chart (1971)	Peak position
US Billboard Top LPs	101
US Cashbox Top 100 Albums	93
