= Look to Your Heart (Perry Como album) =

Studio album by Perry Como
- Released: November 1968
- Recorded: June 5, 7, 12, 19, 1968
- Genre: Vocal
- Label: RCA Victor
- Producer: Andy Wiswell

Perry Como chronology
The Perry Como Christmas Album (1968)	Look to Your Heart (1968)	Seattle (1968)

Look to Your Heart is Perry Como's 16th RCA Victor 12" long-play album, released in late November of 1968.

== Overview ==
This album, released shortly after the previous Christmas LP, is one filled with tender ballads and soft standards. Sessions were recorded five months prior at the RCA Victor Webster Hall studios in New York City where several early Como albums were produced. A number of these selections were first introduced a year earlier on the 1967 NBC Perry Como Holiday Special. It included a recent single, (The) Father of Girls. Work by composers Johnny Mercer, Lerner and Loewe and Rodgers and Hart are highlights in this collection.

The album contained one minor hit single, "The Father of Girls". It reached No. 92 on the US Billboard Hot 100 and No. 10 Easy Listening in the winter of 1968, preceding the release of the LP, but the LP itself didn't chart.

== Track listing ==
=== Side 1 ===
1. "Look to Your Heart" (Music by Jimmy Van Heusen and lyrics by Sammy Cahn)
2. "My Cup Runneth Over" (Music by Harvey Schmidt and lyrics by Tom Jones)
3. "Love in a Home" (Music by Gene De Paul and lyrics by Johnny Mercer)
4. "In These Crazy Times" (Music by Sidney Lippman and lyrics by Sylvia Dee)
5. "Try to Remember" (Music by Harvey Schmidt and lyrics by Tom Jones)

=== Side 2 ===
1. "Sunrise, Sunset" (from Fiddler on the Roof) (Music by Jerry Bock and lyrics by Sheldon Harnick)
2. "How to Handle a Woman" (Music by Frederick Loewe and lyrics by Alan Jay Lerner)
3. "When You're in Love" (Music by Gene De Paul and lyrics by Johnny Mercer)
4. "You're Nearer" (Music by Richard Rodgers and lyrics by Lorenz Hart)
5. "The Father of Girls" (Words and Music by Ervin M. Drake)
