= Dream Along with Me (I'm on My Way to a Star) =

"Dream Along with Me (I'm on My Way to a Star)" is a popular song, written by Carl Sigman. The song is most associated with Perry Como as his theme song to his TV show.

== Recordings ==
Como recorded the song on June 7, 1956, and it was issued by RCA Victor Records as catalog number 20-6590 (78 rpm) and 47-6590 (45 rpm). The flip side was "Somebody Up There Likes Me." The song reached number 85 on the Billboard magazine charts. The same recording (both sides) was issued in the United Kingdom by His Master's Voice as catalog number POP-304. A later version, used regularly as his theme, was recorded on March 12, 1958.
