= I Think of You (1970 song) =

1970 song by Rod McKuen

"I Think of You" is a song with music by Francis Lai and lyrics by Rod McKuen, published in 1970, and included on McKuen's 1971 album "Pastorale".

== Perry Como recording ==
The song was a hit for Perry Como in 1971, and was the title track of his 1971 album I Think of You. This recording went into the Top 5 of the US Easy Listening chart and Top 20 on the UK chart.

=== Chart performance ===
Chart (1971)	Peak position
Canada (RPM)	36
UK Singles (The Official Charts Company)	14
US Billboard Easy Listening	5
US Billboard Hot 100	53
