= Love Makes the World Go 'Round (1958 song) =

"Love Makes the World Go 'Round" is a popular music song written by Ollie Jones. The most popular version was recorded by Perry Como in 1958. He made two recordings that year, one on September 5 and one on September 16. The 45 rpm single based on one of these was released by RCA Victor Records as catalog numbers 47-7353 (mono) and 61-7353 (stereo). It peaked at number 33 on the Billboard chart and number 14 in Canada.

A United Kingdom release was made by RCA (78 rpm, catalog number 1086), which reached number 6 on the UK Singles Chart and number 5 on the Belgium chart. A Japanese release in stereo was made by RCA (catalog number SX-1002). All of these were backed by "Mandolins in the Moonlight" on the flip side.

British rockabilly trio the Jets released their version in 1982 which reached number 21 on the UK Singles Chart.
