= It's Impossible (album) =

Studio album by Perry Como
- Released: December 1970
- Recorded: May 6, November 23–25, 1970
- Genres: Vocal, easy listening
- Label: RCA Victor
- Producers: Don Costa; Ernie Altschuler

Perry Como chronology
| Perry Como in Person at the International Hotel, Las Vegas (1970) | It's Impossible (1970) | I Think of You (1971) |

It's Impossible is Perry Como's 19th long-play album released by RCA Records in December 1970. The album was Como's biggest selling LP of the 1970s and was quickly compiled to capitalize on the success of the single, "It's Impossible", which hit the top ten on the Billboard Hot 100 singles chart and number one on the Easy Listening chart in the United States.

== Overview ==
With production handled by Ernie Altschuler, Como recorded "It's Impossible" in May 1970, and it was released as a single later in the year. It went on to become Como's biggest hit on the Hot 100 in over a decade. With this success, Como joined forces with producer Don Costa to record a full album which would include the hit track. It was recorded in late November 1970 and released to record stores before the end of the year.

The additional selections to round out the album primarily focused on contemporary pop and rock ballads of the time with songs that were recorded by acts like the Beatles, Simon and Garfunkel, the Carpenters, and the Partridge Family. The album peaked at number 22 on the Billboard Top LP's chart in March 1971, and reached number 13 in the UK in June 1971.

== Critical reception ==
Professional ratings
Review scores
| Source | Rating |
|---|---|
| AllMusic | 3/5 stars |

William Ruhlmann of AllMusic agreed with Como and Costa's decision "to fill up the album with recent pop hits...in arrangements similar to the hit versions" with some exceptions: "the choice of the Partridge Family's 'I Think I Love You' was hilariously inappropriate." But Como's "real hope of sustaining his comeback lay in finding more songs of his own like 'It's Impossible.'

== Track listing ==
=== Side one ===
1. "It's Impossible" (music by Armando Manzanero, lyrics by Sid Wayne)
2. "Raindrops Keep Fallin' On My Head" (music by Burt Bacharach, lyrics by Hal David)
3. "Something" (words and music by George Harrison)
4. "Snowbird" (words and music by Gene MacLellan)
5. "A House Is Not a Home" (music by Bacharach, lyrics by David)

=== Side two ===
1. "Everybody Is Looking for an Answer" (words and music by Evangeline Seward)
2. "El Condor Pasa" (music by Daniel Alomía Robles, lyrics by Paul Simon)
3. "(They Long to Be) Close to You" (music by Bacharach, lyrics by David)
4. "I Think I Love You" (words and music by Tony Romeo)
5. "We've Only Just Begun" (words and music by Paul Williams and Roger Nichols)

=== Bonus tracks ===
1. "What Love Is Made Of" (words and music by Paul Vance, Jack Segal and Eddie Snyder)
2. "You Made It That Way" (words and music by Dwayne Blackwell and Rani Blackwell)

== Charts ==
| Chart (1971) | Peak position |
|---|---|
| US Billboard Top LP's | 22 |
| US Cash Box Top 100 Albums | 15 |
| UK Albums Chart | 13 |
