= Wanted (Perry Como song) =

Single by Perry Como
- B-side: "Look Out The Window (And See How I'm Standing In The Rain)"
- Released: January 1954
- Recorded: 1953; Manhattan Center, New York City
- Length: 3:05
- Label: RCA Victor
- Songwriters: Jack Fulton; Lois Steele

Perry Como singles chronology
"You Alone (Solo Tu)" (1953)	"Wanted" (1954)	"Idle Gossip" (1954)

"Wanted" is a popular song written by Jack Fulton and Lois Steele. A recording by Perry Como was the most popular version, reaching No. 1 in the US. Al Martino also recorded the song, which reached No. 4 in the UK.

== Background ==
Perry Como recorded "Wanted" on December 29, 1953. This song was accompanied by Hugo Winterhalter's orchestra and chorus, and it was recorded at Manhattan Center, New York City. It was released by RCA Victor as catalog number 20-5647 (in US) and by EMI on the His Master's Voice label as catalog number B 10691. The flip side of the US version was "Look Out The Window (And See How I'm Standing In The Rain)". Como's version of "Wanted" reached No. 1 on Billboard's chart in 1954. It was the most played song on radio in the US from Jan 1 - Oct 9 1954, and the second best-selling song of the year.

== Charts ==
Chart (1954)	Peak position
UK Singles (OCC)	4
US Best Sellers in Stores (Billboard)	1
US Cash Box	1

== Other recordings ==
- Al Martino had a top 10 hit with the song in the United Kingdom.
- An early recorded version is by singer-pianist Moon Mullican.
- Anne Murray included it on her album Croonin' (1993).

== Popular culture ==
- The song was featured in a Christmas episode of "WKRP in Cincinnati", in a flashback to 12/24/54.
