= And I Love You So (song) =

1970 song performed by Don McLean, rerecorded by Perry Como

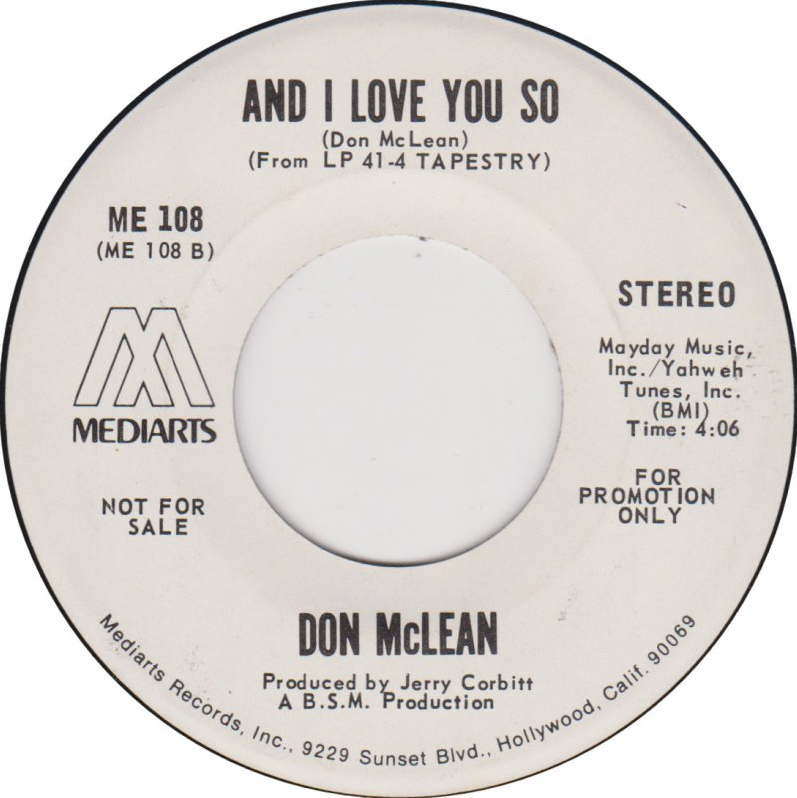
- Promo copy vinyl

Single by Don McLean

from the album Tapestry
- A-side: "Castles in the Air"
- Released: January 1971
- Recorded: June 1969
- Studio: Sierra Sound Laboratories, Berkeley, California, United States
- Length: 4:16
- Label: Mediarts
- Songwriter: Don McLean
- Producer: Jerry Corbitt

"And I Love You So"

Single by Perry Como

from the album And I Love You So
- B-side: "Love Looks So Good on You"
- Released: April 1973
- Recorded: January 17–19, 1973
- Studio: RCA Studio B, Nashville, Tennessee, United States
- Genre: Pop
- Length: 3:14
- Label: RCA
- Songwriter: Don McLean
- Producer: Chet Atkins

Perry Como singles chronology
"Love Don't Care (Where it Grows)" (1973)	"And I Love You So" (1973)	"Beyond Tomorrow (Love Theme from "Serpico")" (1974)

"And I Love You So" is a song written by folk singer and guitarist Don McLean and released on his 1970 debut album, Tapestry. Its verses feature an unusual rhyming scheme for a popular song: ABBA versus the usual AB(C or A)B. The song was the B-side to McLean's debut single "Castles in the Air", released in January 1971. In 1973, "And I Love You So" was released as an A-side with "If We Try" as its B-side on United Artists Records. Versions were released by major artists such as Bobby Goldsboro, Ed Ames, and Bobby Vinton, but only Perry Como's version made a significant chart appearance. It spawned his next album, And I Love You So.

== Perry Como recording ==
"And I Love You So" was a 1973 hit for singer Perry Como on his RCA Victor album of the same name, And I Love You So, reaching No. 29 on the Billboard Hot 100 chart. It would be the last of his many popular recordings, dating back to 1943, to reach the top 40. It also spent one week at No. 1 on the Easy Listening chart. It reached No. 2 in South Africa and No. 3 on the UK Singles Chart on RCA Records and remained on the chart for 35 weeks (the longest of his hits in the UK).

Como also recorded a Spanish version, titled "Y te quiero así". He received personal Spanish lessons from the head of RCA International to get the record made.

=== Chart performance ===
==== Weekly charts ====
Chart (1973)	Peak position
Canada RPM Top 100 Singles	21
Canada RPM Top 100 AC	6
Ireland Singles	2
UK Singles (The Official Charts Company)	3
US Billboard Easy Listening	1
US Billboard Hot 100	29

==== Year-end charts ====
Chart (1973)	Rank
UK	9

== Other recordings ==
The song has been recorded by many other artists in the years since McLean's original version:

- Bobby Goldsboro included his version on his album Come Back Home in 1971. The single release reached No. 93 in Canada.
- Ed Ames released the song as the lead singlefrom his self-titled studio album Ed Ames. The track was first released by RCA Victor as a single in March 1972. The flip was a non-album song titled "The Ship". The single was recommended for radio stations by reviewers from Billboard music industry trade magazine at the time.
- Shirley Bassey recorded this song on her album And I Love You So in 1972.
- Bobby Vinton included his version on his album Ev'ry Day of My Life in 1972.
- The song was recorded by Elvis Presley at RCA studio C in Hollywood, California, on March 11, 1975. It was released on his album Today.
- In 1999, Glen Campbell recorded the song on his album My Hits and Love Songs.
- In 2005, Rick Astley covered the song on his 6th studio album, Portrait.
- In 2008, Harry Connick, Jr. included the song on his Your Songs album.
- In 1993, George Lam recorded the song on his album When a Man Loves a Woman.
- Roch Voisine covered the song on his album Americana, in 2008.
- Other performers who have recorded the song include: Harry Belafonte, Tom T. Hall, Emmylou Harris, Engelbert Humperdinck, Howard Keel, Johnny Mathis, Nana Mouskouri, Olivia Newton-John, Jim Nabors, and Helen Reddy (on her hit album I Am Woman).

== In popular culture ==
- A Filipino film starring Bea Alonzo, Sam Milby and Derek Ramsay with the same name used the song on its official soundtrack. It was released in theaters nationwide on August 12, 2009.

== See also ==
- List of number-one adult contemporary singles of 1973 (U.S.)
