= Temptation (Nacio Herb Brown and Arthur Freed song) =

1933 popular music song

Song by Bing Crosby
- Published: 1933
- Composer: Nacio Herb Brown
- Lyricist: Arthur Freed
- Producer: Wesley Rose

"Temptation" is a popular song published in 1933, with music written by Nacio Herb Brown and lyrics by Arthur Freed.

== Bing Crosby recording ==
The song was introduced by Bing Crosby in the 1933 film Going Hollywood. Crosby recorded the song with Lennie Hayton's orchestra on October 22, 1933, and it reached the No. 3 spot in the charts of the day during a 12-week stay. He recorded it again with John Scott Trotter's Orchestra on March 3, 1945 and also for his 1954 album Bing: A Musical Autobiography.

== Other notable recordings ==
- Other popular versions of the song have been recorded by Ferde Grofé & His Orchestra with vocal refrain by Al Dary on November 21, 1933, Artie Shaw and his orchestra on September 7, 1940, Perry Como in 1945, and by Mario Lanza on 29 November 1951 at Radio Recorders and subsequently released by RCA in January 1952. A British cover version by Steve Conway was released in 1946.
- A parody version, entitled "Tim-tay-shun", was recorded in a country music style by Red Ingle with a vocal by "Cinderella G. Stump" (actually a pseudonym for Jo Stafford) in 1947 and this topped the US charts.
- African-American crooner Billy Eckstine recorded his version December 30, 1947. It reached No. 7 on the Billboard Most-Played Juke Box Race Records chart.
- The Everly Brothers' version (b/w "Stick With Me Baby", Warner Bros. Records WB5220), released in May 1961, reached No. 1 in the UK Singles Chart. This version also peaked at No. 27 on the Billboard Hot 100.

== Use in films ==
- The song was used in the film Singin' in the Rain (1952) and later in the 1983 musical based on the film.
- The song is also prominently featured in Valerio Zurlini's Violent Summer (1959).

== Bibliography ==
- Who Wrote that Song Dick Jacobs & Harriet Jacobs, published by Writer's Digest Books, 1993
