= Nick Perito =

American composer (1924–2005)

- Nick Perito as the conductor for Perry Como's last performance, 1994.

Background information
- Born: Nicholas Perito; April 7, 1924; Denver, Colorado
- Died: August 4, 2005 (aged 81) Hollywood, California
- Occupations: composer arranger bandleader performer
- Instruments: accordion piano
- Years active: 1940s–2004

Nicholas Perito (April 7, 1924 – August 4, 2005) was an American Hollywood composer and arranger and, for 40 years, the closest collaborator of singer Perry Como.

== Life ==
=== Early years ===
Born in Denver, Perito's start in music was at an early age, when he received an accordion as a gift from his parents. Both his uncle and brother encouraged his learning by gifts of sheet music; as he mastered one song, he would then be given a new one as an incentive. Perito started performing at parties at a young age and received a scholarship to the Lamont School of Music, studying at the University of Denver.

Being drafted in 1943 took him to New York, where he served as an Army medic in World War II; he also played piano and did musical arrangements for the Army band. The band musicians were given passes on weekends if there were no military engagements for them and were allowed to pick up jobs during this time. Perito remained in New York after World War II, entering the Juilliard School of Music and graduating from the college in 1949.

=== Career ===
Perito went home to Denver to marry his high school sweetheart, Judy Stone, and worked at Denver's KOA with his own weekday radio program in 1946. The couple then settled in New York, where he worked as a songwriter, arranger, and accordion/piano session musician. Perito also had his own band that had a permanent spot at Jack Dempsey's Broadway Restaurant, owned by the boxer. His first association with Perry Como came through Como's arranger, Ray Charles, in the early 1950s. Como had recorded a novelty song, "Hoop-De-Doo", and Perito was hired to accompany him on accordion for television performances of the song. He became the musical director of United Artists Records in 1961.

In 1963, Como's musical conductor, Mitchell Ayres, wanted to hire some new arrangers for Como's television show; Ray Charles recommended Perito to Ayres. When Ayres left to take a job as the conductor of The Hollywood Palace, Perito became the singer's music director and conductor. Como credited Perito with the idea of recording his final album, Today (1987). Perito continued to work with the singer through his very last performance: Como's Irish Christmas special in 1994. When Mitchell Ayres was killed in a traffic accident in 1969, former Como show producer Nick Vanoff, who was now with The Hollywood Palace, suggested Perito as Ayres' replacement.

Perito's other credits include the Kennedy Center Honors, where he again worked with Vanoff. He was also the musical director for the American Film Institute awards, as well as The Don Knotts Show, Andy Williams and Bing Crosby television specials. Perito wrote the music for the 1968 film, Don't Just Stand There! with Robert Wagner and Mary Tyler Moore. In the same year, Perito played the accordion on the only solo vocal album of his friend and associate, Ray Charles, Memories of a Middle-Aged Movie Fan. Perito was also an influential arranger of background music for Muzak in the late 1960s and early 70s.

He became the musical director for Bob Hope in 1993, and worked with Hope's wife, Dolores, when she decided to pick up her singing career after 60 years. Perito played accordion for actor Paul Sorvino's PBS musical special in 1996. Perito, along with musicians Dick Grove and Allyn Ferguson, was a founder and partner in the Grove School of Music in Van Nuys, California. The school was accredited in 1979 but could no longer afford to keep its doors open by 1991.

== Honors ==
His work earned Perito a dozen Emmy nominations. a year before his death of pulmonary fibrosis in Hollywood.

== Works ==
As composer

- Stay with Me, 1950s
- We Are Love, 1950s
- The Green Leaves of Summer (with others)
- Anema E Core (with others)
- Misirlou/Quien Sera (with others)
- Oh Calcutta
- Mountains of Kisses
- Pianola Pete

As conductor, arranger, director or producer

- Many.
