= Season's Greetings (disambiguation) =

"Season's greetings" is a spoken or written greeting commonly used before or during the Christmas and holiday season.

Season's Greetings may also refer to:

- Season's Greetings (play), a 1980 play by Alan Ayckbourn
- Season's Greetings (short film), an animated short by Michael Dougherty
- Season's Greetings (album), a 1993 album by Tatsurō Yamashita

== See also ==
- Season's Greetings from Perry Como, a 1959 album
- Season's Greetings from Moe, a 2002 album
- Seasons Greetings from Less Than Jake, a 2014 EP
- "Season's Greetings from Sally", a vignette from Charlie Brown's Christmas Tales
- "Season's Greedings" (Lois & Clark episode)
