= TV Favorites =

Studio album by Perry Como
- Released: 1952
- Label: RCA Victor

Perry Como chronology
Supper Club Favorites (1949)	TV Favorites (1952)	Hits from Broadway Shows (1953)

Perry Como TV Favorites, or simply TV Favorites, subtitled As Sung by Perry on His Chesterfield TV Show, is an album by Perry Como released by RCA Victor in 1952.

== Recording ==
The album was recorded with Mitchell Ayres and his orchestra.

== Release ==
The album was released on a 10-inch LP (cat. no. LPM 3013) and in several other formats: a set of four 78-rpm phonograph records (cat. no. P 334), a set of four 45-rpm records (WP 334) and a double EP in a gatefold cover (EPB 3013).

== Reception ==
Professional ratings
Review scores
Source	Rating
Billboard	78/100
AllMusic	3/5 stars

Billboard reviewed the album in its issue from 26 April 1952. The magazine explained that the album's title referred to the fact that it compiled "eight oldies" that Como had performed "from time to time on his television show" and noted that all of these songs "were excellent vehicles for the relaxed and warm voice of the crooner" and they all were "well-done with standout arrangements." The reviewer concluded: "For those who like the breath of nostalgia that yesterday's hits bring and for the many Como fans, this is a natural", giving the album 78 points out of 100 (which indicated a "good" rating).

== Track listing ==
10-inch LP (RCA Victor LPM 3013)

Side 1
No.	Title	Writer(s)	Note(s)	Length
1.	"You'll Never Walk Alone" (from the musical production Carousel)	Oscar Hammerstein II—Richard Rodgers
2.	"Black Moonlight" (Arthur Johnston—Sam Coslow)
3.	"If There Is Someone Lovelier than You" (from the musical production Revenge with Music)	Howard Dietz—Arthur Schwartz
4.	"Summertime" (from the musical production Porgy and Bess)	Ira Gershwin—George Gershwin	with Sally Sweetland

Side 2
No.	Title	Writer(s)	Length
1.	"While We're Young"	Alec Wilder—Morty Palitz—Bill Engvick
2.	"My Heart Stood Still" (from the musical comedy Connecticut Yankee)	Lorenz Hart—Richard Rodgers
3.	"I Concentrate on You" (from the M-G-M film Broadway Melody of 1940)	Cole Porter
4.	"Over the Rainbow" (from the M-G-M film The Wizard of Oz)	E. Y. Harburg—Harold Arlen
