= Perry Como Sings Merry Christmas Music =

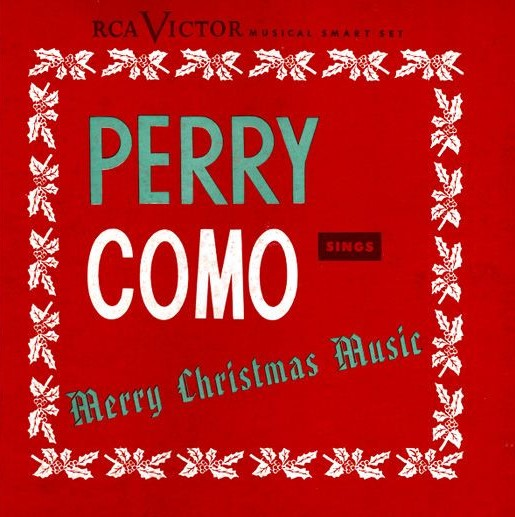

Studio album by Perry Como
- Released: 1946 (original release)
- Recorded: 1946, 1947, 1953
- Genre: Christmas
- Label: RCA Victor

Perry Como chronology
Perry Como Sings Merry Christmas Music (1946)	A Sentimental Date with Perry (1948)

Perry Como Sings Merry Christmas Music was Perry Como's first Christmas album, originally issued by RCA Victor as a 78 RPM album set in 1946. The original release included "O Little Town of Bethlehem" which was replaced in 1947 by Irving Berlin's famous song "White Christmas". This album, along with Como's later stereophonic Christmas collections, Season's Greetings from Perry Como (1959) and The Perry Como Christmas Album (1968), are among the all time best-selling Christmas albums. RCA has reissued Merry Christmas Music on LP, tape and compact disc several times.

== Track listing ==
The original release of Merry Christmas Music was an RCA Victor "Musical Smart Set" consisting of four 10" 78 RPM records.

Disc 1:

1. "That Christmas Feeling" (3:23), Recorded August 6, 1946 with Russ Case and His Orchestra
2. "I'll Be Home For Christmas" (2:53), Recorded August 6, 1946 with Russ Case and His Orchestra

Disc 2:

1. "Silent Night" (3:50), Recorded August 20, 1946 with Organ and Choir conducted by Russ Case
2. "O Come, All Ye Faithful (Adeste Fideles)" (2:45), Recorded August 20, 1946 with Organ and Choir conducted by Russ Case

Disc 3:

1. "Jingle Bells" (2:58), Recorded August 22, 1946 with Russ Case and His Orchestra and Chorus
2. "Santa Claus Is Comin' To Town" (2:15), Recorded August 1, 1946 with Russ Case and His Orchestra and The Satisfiers

Disc 4:

1. "Winter Wonderland" (2:37), Recorded August 1, 1946 with Russ Case and His Orchestra and The Satisfiers
2. "O Little Town of Bethlehem" (2:54), Recorded August 20, 1946 with Organ and Choir conducted by Russ Case

The 1947 Reissue: This reissue replaced "O Little Town of Bethlehem" with "White Christmas". With this change, "White Christmas" was now on the second side of disc three moving "Santa Claus Is Comin' To Town" to the first side of disc four and "Winter Wonderland" to the second.

The 1951 Reissue: The same contents as 1947, only the album was now available on a 10" LP (LPM-51) vinyl record as well as a 45 RPM set, containing 4 records.

The 1956 reissue was the first major change. The album (LPM-1243) included the same eight songs as before, as well as eight "new" ones which had been recorded and released in 1953 on the Perry Como LP, Around The Christmas Tree (LPM-3133). This album was also released that year as two separate EPs, one with the same title, Around The Christmas Tree, and the other, Christmas Joy. The 1956 album had the newer songs on Side One and the original eight songs on Side Two. The album was also released on three extended-play 45s. The first two came as a set, (EPB-1243) while the third one was sold separately (EPA-920).

Side One:

1. "'Twas The Night Before Christmas" (3:45), Recorded June 22, 1953 with String Ensemble Directed by Mitchell Ayres
2. "The Twelve Days of Christmas" (3:59), Recorded May 26, 1953 with Mitchell Ayres' Orchestra and Chorus
3. "God Rest Ye Merry, Gentlemen" (3:32), Recorded May 26, 1953 with Mitchell Ayres' Orchestra and Chorus
4. "C-H-R-I-S-T-M-A-S" (2:51), Recorded May 5, 1953 with Mitchell Ayres and His Orchestra
5. "Joy To The World" (2:37), Recorded May 26, 1953 with Mitchell Ayres' Orchestra and Chorus
6. "Rudolph The Red-Nosed Reindeer" (2:44), Recorded May 21, 1953 with Mitchell Ayres' Orchestra and Chorus
7. "Frosty The Snow Man" (2:18), Recorded May 21, 1953 with Mitchell Ayres' Orchestra and Chorus
8. "The Christmas Song (Merry Christmas to You)" (3:33), Recorded May 5, 1953 with Mitchell Ayres and His Orchestra

Side Two:

1. "That Christmas Feelin'" (3:23), Recorded August 6, 1946 with Russ Case and His Orchestra
2. "I'll Be Home For Christmas" (2:53), Recorded August 6, 1946 with Russ Case and His Orchestra
3. "Silent Night" (3:50), Recorded August 20, 1946 with Organ and Choir conducted by Russ Case
4. "O Come, All Ye Faithful (Adeste Fideles)" (2:45), Recorded August 20, 1946 with Organ and Choir conducted by Russ Case
5. "Jingle Bells" (2:58), Recorded August 22, 1946 with Russ Case and His Orchestra and Chorus
6. "White Christmas" (3:27), Recorded July 10, 1947 with Mixed Chorus and Lloyd Shaffer's Orchestra
7. "Santa Claus Is Comin' To Town" (2:15), Recorded August 1, 1946 with Russ Case and His Orchestra and The Satisfiers
8. "Winter Wonderland" (2:37), Recorded August 1, 1946 with Russ Case and His Orchestra and The Satisfiers

In 1961, RCA Victor reissued the album on its budget label, RCA Camden (CAL-660), available in both original monophonic and for the first time in reprocessed (fake) stereo sound. For this slightly shorter budget release, the album retained the same track sequence, except the song "Santa Claus Is Comin' To Town" was omitted. The album also featured a different cover photo of Como, but utilized the same liner notes from the previous RCA Victor LP release. This version charted 14 weeks on Billboard's Christmas Records album chart peaking at #16 on December 23, 1967.

During the 1970s, Pickwick Records leased the rights to reissue a number of recordings from the RCA Camden catalog and reissued the Merry Christmas Music LP with revised cover art on the Pickwick label. RCA eventually reclaimed the rights to its catalog of Camden recordings leased to Pickwick, and reissued Merry Christmas Music on LP, cassette and compact disc, in 1985, with its original 1961 front cover art. The album has been reissued on the RCA Camden/Special Products label at least three times on CD, each with different artwork. RCA has also issued the album in several countries including Mexico, Canada, the UK and Australia. In 2012, RCA reissued all the tracks from Merry Christmas Music along with the rest of Como's Christmas recordings in the 3-CD set, Perry Como Complete RCA Christmas Collection.

== Charts ==
Year	Peak chart position
Year	US Albums
1946	1
1947	2
1949	4
1957	3
1958	9
