= To Know You Is to Love You =

To Know You Is to Love You may refer to:

- "To Know You Is to Love You" (song), a 1972 song by Syreeta Wright and Stevie Wonder, also recorded by B. B King
- To Know You Is to Love You (album), a 1973 album by B. B. King
- "To Know You (Is to Love You)", a 1952 song, recorded by Perry Como
- "To Know Him Is to Love Him", a song by Phil Spector sometimes recorded as "To Know You Is to Love You"
