= Around the Christmas Tree =

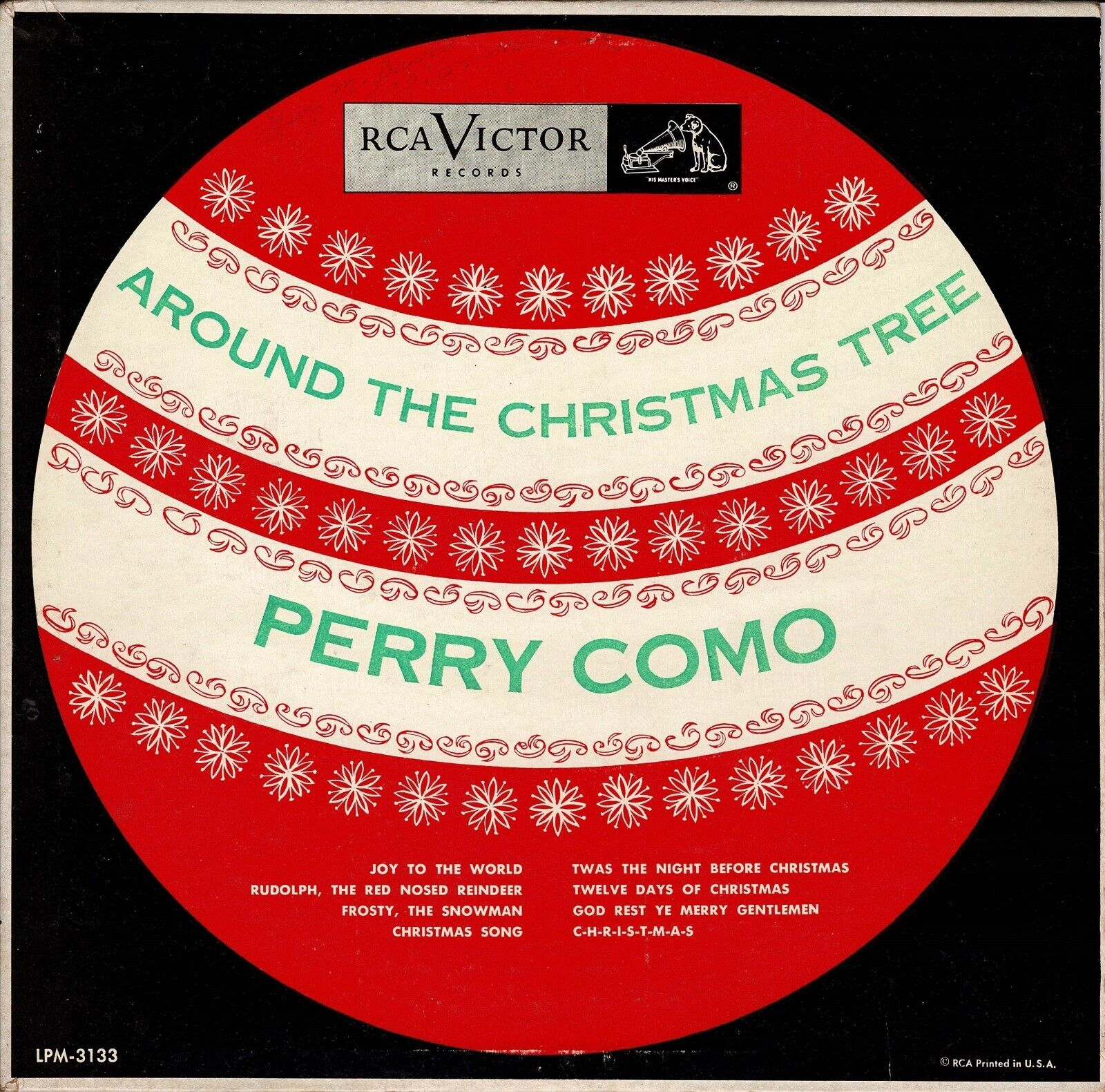

Studio album by Perry Como
- Released: 1953
- Label: RCA Victor

Perry Como chronology
Hits from Broadway Shows (1953)	Around the Christmas Tree (1953)	I Believe (1953)

Professional ratings
Review scores
Source	Rating
AllMusic	2/5 stars

Around the Christmas Tree is an album of Christmas songs sung by Perry Como released by RCA Victor in 1953.

== Release ==
The album was originally released in the form of a 10-inch LP record (cat. no. LPM-3133; with eight songs, four on each side) and as a set of two EPs (cat. no. EPA-496–7).

== Reception ==
The album was one of the best-sellers during Christmas of 1953 and ranked number 10 on Billboard's list of "1953 Best-Selling Christmas Albums".

== Track listing ==
10-inch LP (RCA Victor LPM-3133)

Side 1
No.	Title	Length
1.	"'Twas the Night Before Christmas"
2.	"The Twelve Days of Christmas"
3.	"God Rest Ye Merry, Gentlemen"
4.	"C-H-R-I-S-T-M-A-S"

Side 2
No.	Title	Length
1.	"Joy to the World!"
2.	"Rudolph the Red-Nosed Reindeer"
3.	"Frosty the Snow Man"
4.	"The Christmas Song (Merry Christmas to You)"

EP (RCA Victor EPA-496)

Side 1
No.	Title	Writer(s)	Note(s)	Length
1.	"'Twas the Night Before Christmas"	Poem by Clement C. Moore; Original music by Ray Charles	with String Ensemble dir. by Mitchell Ayres
2.	"The Twelve Days of Christmas"	Traditional	with Mitchell Ayres' Orchestra and Chorus

Side 2
No.	Title	Writer(s)	Note(s)	Length
1.	"God Rest Ye Merry, Gentlemen"	Traditional	with Mitchell Ayres' Orchestra and Chorus
2.	"C-H-R-I-S-T-M-A-S"	Jenny Lou Carson—Eddy Arnold	with Mitchell Ayres' Orchestra and Chorus

== Charts ==
=== Year-end charts ===
Chart (1953)	Position
US Best-Selling Christmas Albums (Billboard)	10
