= Hits from Broadway Shows =

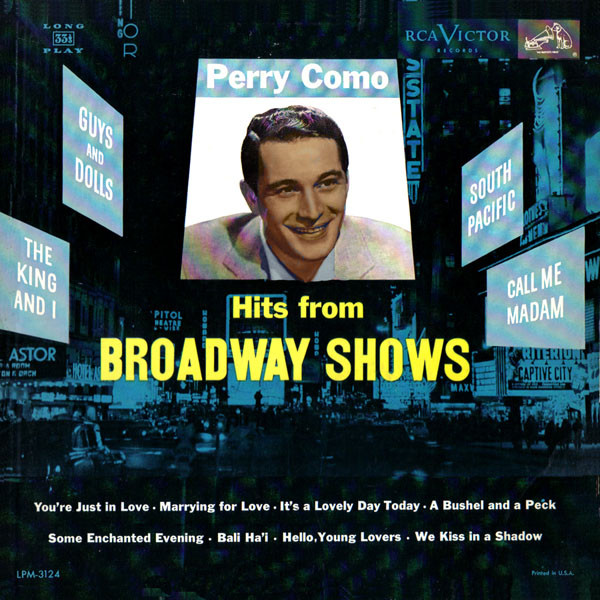
- 1953 cover

Studio album by Perry Como
- Released: 1953 (10-inch LP); 1956 (12-inch LP)
- Label: RCA Victor

Perry Como chronology
TV Favorites (1952)	Hits from Broadway Shows (1953)	Around the Christmas Tree (1953)

Professional ratings
Review scores
Source	Rating
The Encyclopedia of Popular Music	3/5 stars
The Encyclopedia of Popular Music	(1956 ver.)

Perry Como Sings the Hits from Broadway Shows, or simply Hits from Broadway Shows, is a studio album by Perry Como released by RCA Victor in 1953.

The album was originally issued on a 10-inch LP (cat. no. LPM-3124) and contained eight tracks (four on each side).

There is also a 1956 version with 12 tracks (six on each side).

== Reception ==
The album was featured on Billboard's alphabetical Popular Albums chart.

== Track listing ==
10-inch LP (RCA Victor LPM-3124)

Side 1
No.	Title	Note(s)	Length
1.	"A Bushel and a Peck"	and Betty Hutton
2.	"You're Just in Love (I Wonder Why)"
3.	"Marrying for Love"
4.	"It's a Lovely Day Today"

Side 2
No.	Title	Length
1.	"Some Enchanted Evening"
2.	"Bali Ha'i"
3.	"Hello, Young Lovers"
4.	"We Kiss in a Shadow"

=== 1956 version ===
All the songs are performed by Perry Como with Mitchell Ayres and his Orchestra except where noted.

12-inch LP (RCA Victor LPM-1191)

Side 1
No.	Title	Writer(s)	Note(s)	Length
1.	"A Bushel and a Peck"	Loesser	and Betty Hutton
2.	"You're Just in Love (I Wonder Why)"	Berlin	with The Fontane Sisters
3.	"Marrying for Love"	Berlin
4.	"It's a Lovely Day Today"	Berlin	with The Fontane Sisters
5.	"Summertime"	I. Gershwin–G. Gershwin	Sally Sweetland
6.	"You'll Never Walk Alone"	Hammerstein II–Rodgers

Side 2
No.	Title	Writer(s)	Length
1.	"Some Enchanted Evening"	Hammerstein II–Rodgers
2.	"Bali Ha'i"	Hammerstein II–Rodgers
3.	"Hello, Young Lovers"	Hammerstein II–Rodgers
4.	"We Kiss in a Shadow"	Hammerstein II–Rodgers
5.	"My Heart Stood Still"	Hart–Rodgers
6.	"All at Once You Love Her"	Hammerstein II–Rodgers
