= Supper Club Favorites =

Studio album by Perry Como
- Released: 1949; 1952 (10-inch LP)
- Label: RCA Victor

Perry Como chronology
A Sentimental Date with Perry (1948)	Supper Club Favorites (1949)	TV Favorites (1952)

Supper Club Favorites is an album by Perry Como released by RCA Victor in 1949. The album's title highlighted Como's television show sponsored by Chesterfield Cigarettes.

== Release and reception ==
Professional ratings
Review scores
Source	Rating
Billboard	80/100
AllMusic	3/5 stars

The album was originally released in two formats: as a set of three 78-rpm phonograph records (cat. no. P 237) and as a set of three 45-rpm records (WP 237)

Billboard reviewed the 3× 78-rpm record package in its issue from 26 February 1949, giving it 80 points out of 100 (which indicated an "excellent" rating) and writing: "Six of Como's big standard sides have been re-coupled and boxed in one of Victor's new-type containers, without pockets. Como fans, who have not already picked up most of these as singles should go for the entire deal".

The album was ninth on Billboard's semi-annual list of "Top-Selling Popular Record Albums" of the first half of 1949, published in the issue from July 30.

In 1952, the album was re-issued – with two additional songs – on a 10-inch LP (cat. no. 3044) and as a two-extended-play (45 rpm) record package.

== Track listing ==
Set of three 78-rpm records (RCA Victor P 237)

20-3298-A
No.	Title	Writer(s)	Artist(s)	Length
1.	"When You Were Sweet Sixteen"	James Thornton	Perry Como and The Satisfiers with Lloyd Shaffer and his Orch.

20-3298-B
No.	Title	Writer(s)	Artist(s)	Length
1.	"Song of Songs"	Clarence Lucas – Moya	Perry Como with Lloyd Shaffer and his Orchestra

20-3299-A
No.	Title	Writer(s)	Artist(s)	Length
1.	"Because"	Edward Teschemacher – Guy D'Hardelot	Perry Como with Russ Case and his Orchestra

20-3299-B
No.	Title	Writer(s)	Artist(s)	Length
1.	"Till the End of Time" (based on Chopin's Polonaise)	Buddy Kaye – Ted Mossman	Perry Como with Russ Case and his Orch.

20-3300-A
No.	Title	Writer(s)	Artist(s)	Length
1.	"Prisoner of Love"	Robin – Gaskill – Columbo,	Perry Como with Russ Case and his Orch.

20-3300-B
No.	Title	Writer(s)	Artist(s)	Length
1.	"Temptation"	Arthur Freed – Nacio Herb Brown	Perry Como with Ted Steele and his Orchestra

=== 1952 version ===
10-inch LP (RCA Victor LPM 3044)

Side 1
No.	Title	Writer(s)	Note(s)	Length
1.	"Prisoner of Love"	Leo Robin – Clarence Gaskill – Russ Columbo	with Russ Case and his Orch.
2.	"Because"	Edward Teschemacher – Guy D'Hardelot
3.	"When You Were Sweet Sixteen"	James Thornton	with Lloyd Shaffer and his Orch. with The Satisfiers
4.	"Far Away Places"	Kramer – Whitney	with Henri Rene and his Orch.

Side 2
No.	Title	Writer(s)	Note(s)	Length
1.	"Song of Songs"	Clarence Lucas – Moya	with Lloyd Shaffer and his Orch.
2.	"Till the End of Time" (based on Chopin's Polonaise)	Buddy Kaye – Ted Mossman	with Russ Case and his Orch.
3.	"Temptation"	Arthur Freed – Nacio Herb Brown	with Ted Steele and his Orchestra
4.	"If"	Evans – Hargreaves – Damerell	with Mitchell Ayres and his Orch.

== Charts ==
Chart (1949)	Peak position
US Best-Selling Popular Record Albums (Billboard)	4
