= Coral Cove Park =

Waterfront park in Tequesta, Florida, US

Coordinates: 26.963°N 80.079°W

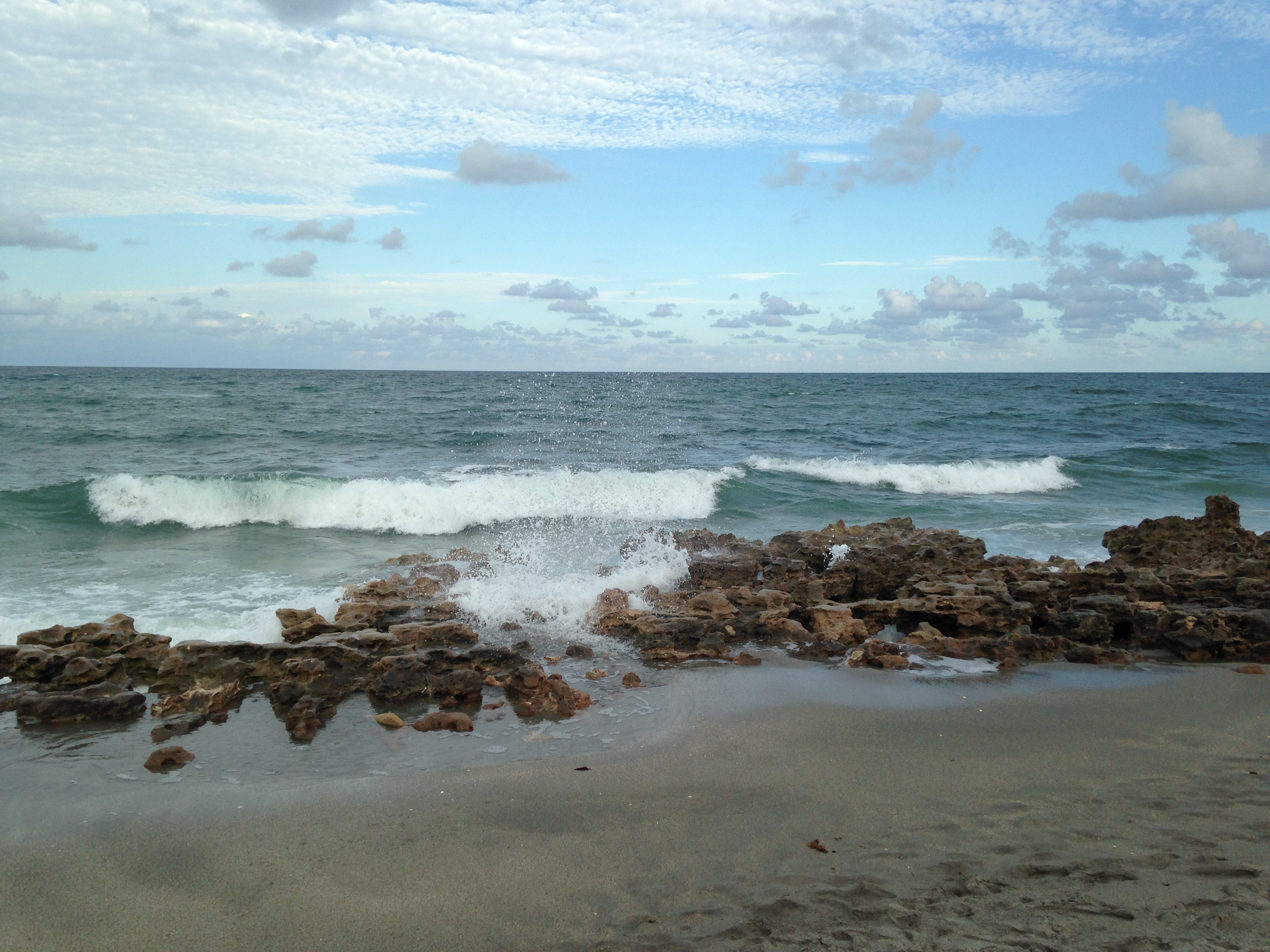
Coral Cove Park

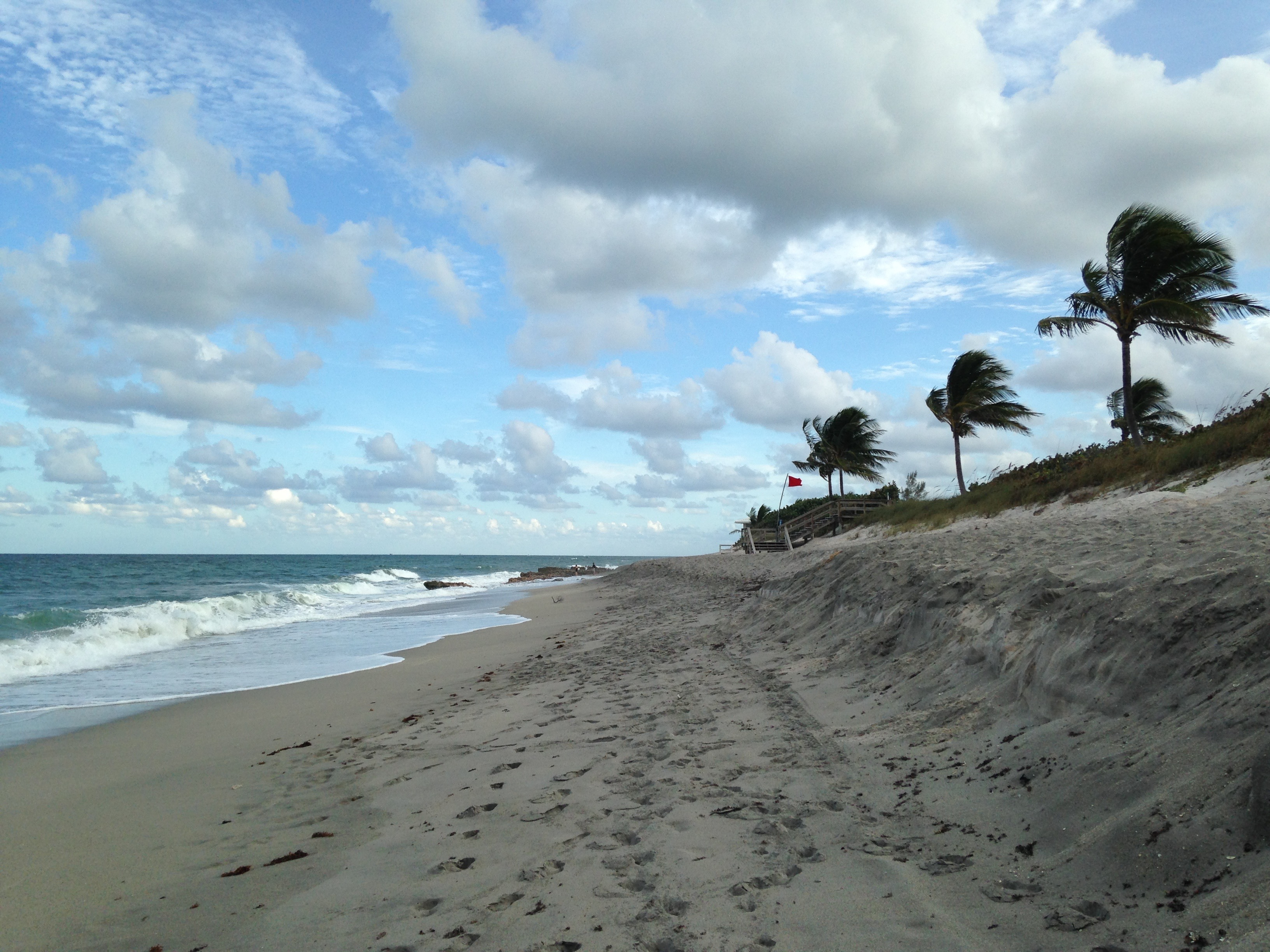

Coral Cove Park is a waterfront park located in Tequesta, Florida, right outside the city of Jupiter at 19450 State Road 707. The park is beside the Atlantic Ocean, near the Indian River and is managed by Palm Beach County Parks and Recreation.

The park, which is almost 15 acres, includes approximately 2,610 feet of beach frontage (most of which is guarded) and 600 feet of intracoastal waterway frontage. The most prominent feature of the beach is the natural limestone, which is part of the Atlantic Coastal Ridge. These rocks, as well as the coral reefs, are inhabited by marine wildlife, including fish, sea turtles, eels, sharks and marine worms.

== Recreational activities ==
The beach and intracoastal waterway are typically used for swimming, snorkeling, and salt water fishing. The beach contains a large selection of shells for those interested in collecting.

The park contains covered picnic areas with tables and built-in grills. The playground is suitable for children ages 5 through 12. The park is equipped with bathrooms and outdoor showers.

== Restrictions ==
The park prohibits the public from feeding wildlife. Dogs and other pets are not permitted.
