= A Sentimental Date with Perry =

- 1948 cover

Studio album by Perry Como
- Released: 1948; 1955 or 1956 (12-inch LP)
- Label: RCA Victor

Perry Como chronology
Perry Como Sings Merry Christmas Music (1946)	A Sentimental Date with Perry (1948)	Supper Club Favorites (1949)

A Sentimental Date with Perry, also known as A Sentimental Date with Perry Como, is an album by Perry Como released by RCA Victor in February 1948.

Originally, it was a four-records album (cat. no. P-187) containing eight songs across eight sides. In 1952, it was re-issued on a 10-inch LP record.

There was also a later 12-inch LP version with the same title and the same (but extended to 12) song list, see #12-inch LP. It was released in the middle to late 1950s.

== Release ==
The album was originally released as a set of four 10-inch 78-rpm phonograph records (cat. no. P 187) containing eight tracks across eight sides and as a set of three 7-inch 45-rpm records (WP 187; did not include the record "What'll I Do?"/"Love Me or Leave Me").

Professional ratings
Review scores
Source	Rating
Billboard	(1952 ver.)

In 1952, it was issued in two more formats: on LP (a 10-inch LP, cat. no. LPM 3035) and on EP (two EPs in a gatefold sleeve; EPB 3035).

== Reception ==
The album spent three consecutive weeks at number one on Billboard's Best-Selling Popular Record Albums chart in February–March 1948.

== Track listing ==
Set of four 10-inch 78-rpm records (RCA Victor P 187)

20-2660-A
No.	Title	Writer(s)	Artist(s)	Length
1.	"When Day Is Done"	B. G. DeSylva—Robert Katcher	Perry Como with Russ Case and his Orchestra

20-2660-B
No.	Title	Writer(s)	Artist(s)	Length
1.	"When Your Hair Has Turned to Silver (I Will Love You Just the Same)"	Charlie Tobias—Peter De Rose	Perry Como with Russ Case and his Orchestra

20-2661-A
No.	Title	Writer(s)	Artist(s)	Length
1.	"Carolina Moon"	Benny Davis—Joe Burke	Perry Como with Orchestra, Lloyd Shaffer, Director

20-2661-B
No.	Title	Writer(s)	Artist(s)	Length
1.	"Body and Soul" (Used in the United Artists film Body and Soul)	Heyman–Sour–Eyton–Green	Perry Como with Orchestra, Lloyd Shaffer, Director

20-2662-A
No.	Title	Writer(s)	Artist(s)	Length
1.	"What'll I Do?"	Irving Berlin	Perry Como with Russ Case and his Orchestra

20-2662-B
No.	Title	Writer(s)	Artist(s)	Length
1.	"Love Me or Leave Me"	Gus Kahn—Walter Donaldson	Perry Como and The Satisfiers with Russ Case and his Orchestra

20-2663-A
No.	Title	Writer(s)	Artist(s)	Length
1.	"If We Can't Be the Same Old Sweethearts, We'll Just Be the Same Old Friends"	Joseph McCarthy—Jimmie V. Monaco	Perry Como with Russ Case and his Orchestra

20-2663-B
No.	Title	Writer(s)	Artist(s)	Length
1.	"I'm Always Chasing Rainbows"	Joseph McCarthy—Harry Carroll	Perry Como and The Satisfiers with Russ Case and his Orchestra

== 12-inch LP ==
A Sentimental Date with Perry Como

Studio album by Perry Como
- Released: 1955 or 1956
- Label: RCA Victor

In the middle to late 1950s, RCA Victor released a 12-inch LP (cat. no. LPM 1177) titled A Sentimental Date with Perry Como that contained the same songs as the original album plus four additional songs ("Blue Room" and "With a Rose in My Heart" on side 1, "Lies" and "No Other Love" on side 2). There was also a double-EP version of the new album, with 9 tracks instead of 12 (EPB 1177).

=== Track listing ===
12-inch LP (RCA Victor LPM 1177)

Side 1
No.	Title	Length
1.	"When Day Is Done"
2.	"Carolina Moon"
3.	"What'll I Do?"
4.	"If We Can't Be the Same Old Sweethearts, We'll Just Be the Same Old Friends"
5.	"Blue Room"
6.	"With a Song in My Heart"

Side 2
No.	Title	Length
1.	"I'm Always Chasing Rainbows"
2.	"Love Me or Leave Me"
3.	"Body and Soul"
4.	"When Your Hair Has Turned to Silver (I Will Love You Just the Same)"
5.	"Lies"
6.	"No Other Love"

== Charts ==
Chart (1948)	Peak position
US Billboard Best-Selling Popular Record Albums	1

== See also ==
- List of Billboard Best-Selling Popular Record Albums number ones of 1948
