= Perry Como =

American singer, actor, and TV personality (1912–2001)

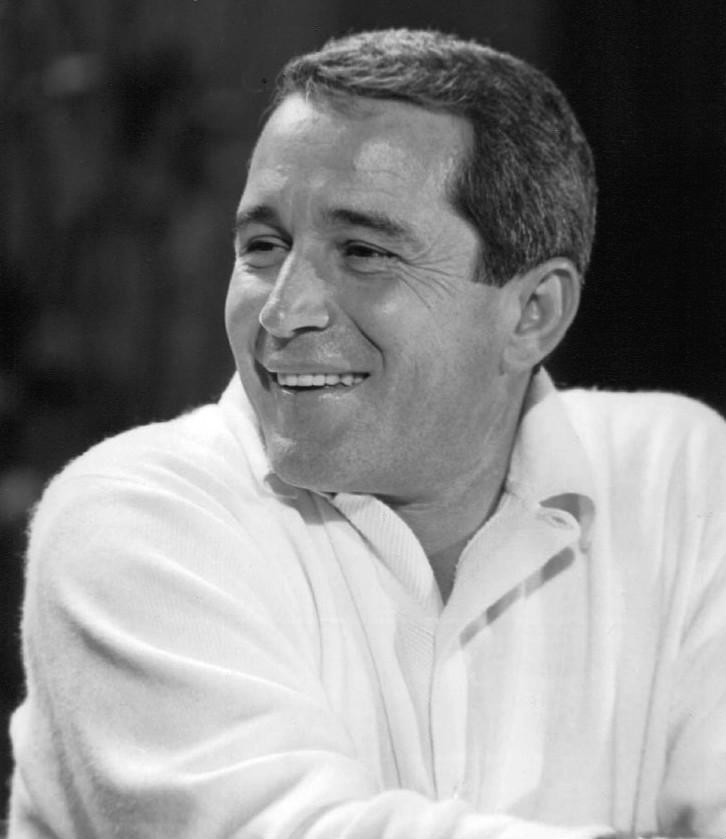
- Publicity still, c. 1962
- Born: Pierino Ronald Como; May 18, 1912; Canonsburg, Pennsylvania, U.S.
- Died: May 12, 2001 (aged 88); Jupiter Inlet Colony, Florida, U.S.
- Resting place: Riverside Memorial Park, Tequesta, Florida
- Other name: Mr. C.
- Occupations: Singer; actor; television personality
- Years active: 1932–1997
- Spouse: Roselle Belline (m. 1933; died 1998)
- Children: 3
- Musical career
- Genres: Vocal pop; easy listening
- Instrument: Vocals
- Labels: Decca; RCA Victor; His Master's Voice

Pierino Ronald "Perry" Como (/ˈkoʊmoʊ/; May 18, 1912 – May 12, 2001) was an American singer, actor, and television personality. During a career spanning more than half a century, he recorded exclusively for RCA Victor for 44 years, from 1943 until 1987.

"Mr. C.", as Como was nicknamed, reportedly sold over 100 million records worldwide and pioneered a weekly musical variety television show. His weekly television shows and seasonal specials were broadcast throughout the world. Como recorded primarily vocal pop and was renowned for recordings in the intimate, easy-listening genre pioneered by Bing Crosby. In the official RCA Records Billboard magazine memorial, Como's life was summed up in these few words: "50 years of music and a life well lived. An example to all."

Como received five Emmys from 1955 to 1959, and a Christopher Award in 1956. He also shared a Peabody Award with good friend Jackie Gleason in 1956. Como received a Kennedy Center Honor in 1987 and was inducted into the Academy of Television Arts & Sciences Hall of Fame three years later. Posthumously, he received the Grammy Lifetime Achievement Award in 2002 and was inducted into the Long Island Music Hall of Fame in 2006. Como has the distinction of having three stars on the Hollywood Walk of Fame, for his work in radio, television, and music.

== Early years ==
Como was born in Canonsburg, Pennsylvania, about 20 miles (32 km) southwest of Pittsburgh. He was the seventh of 13 children and the first American-born child of Pietro Como (1877–1945) and Lucia Travaglini (1883–1961), who both immigrated to the US in 1910 from the Abruzzese town of Palena, Italy. Como did not begin speaking English until entering school since the Comos spoke Italian at home. The family had a second-hand organ his father had bought for $3; as soon as Como was able to toddle, he would head to the instrument, pump the bellows, and play music he had heard.

Pietro, a mill hand and an amateur baritone, had all his children take music lessons even if he could barely afford them. In a rare 1957 interview, Como's mother, Lucia, described how her young son also took on other jobs to pay for more music lessons; Como learned to play many different instruments, but never had a voice lesson. He showed more musical talent in his teenaged years as a trombone player in the town's brass band, playing guitar, singing at weddings, and as an organist at church. Como was a member of the Canonsburg Italian Band along with bandleader Stan Vinton, father of singer Bobby Vinton and often a customer at Como's barber shop.

Como started helping his family at age 10, working before and after school in Steve Fragapane's barber shop for 50¢ a week. By age 13, Como had graduated to having his own chair in the Fragapane barber shop, although he stood on a box to tend to his customers. Also around this time, Como lost his week's wages in a dice game. Filled with shame, Como locked himself in his room and did not come out until hunger got the better of him. Como managed to tell his father what had happened to the money his family depended on. His father told Como that he was entitled to make a mistake and that he hoped his son would never do anything worse than this.

When Como was 14, his father became unable to work because of a severe heart condition, resulting in Como and his brothers becoming the support of the household.

Despite his musical ability, Como's primary ambition was to become the best barber in Canonsburg. Practicing on his father, Como mastered the skills well enough to have his own shop at age 14. One of Como's regular customers at the barber shop owned a Greek coffeehouse that included a barber shop area, and asked Como whether he would like to take over that portion of his shop. Como had so much work after moving to the coffeehouse, he had to hire two barbers to help. His customers worked mainly at the nearby steel mills. They were well-paid, did not mind spending money on themselves, and enjoyed Como's song renditions. He did especially well when one of his customers would marry. The groom and his men would avail themselves of every treatment Como and his assistants had to offer. Como sang romantic songs while busying himself with the groom as the other two barbers worked with the rest of the groom's party. During the wedding preparation, the groom's friends and relatives would come into the shop with gifts of money for Como. He became so popular as a "wedding barber" in the Greek community that he was asked to provide his services in Pittsburgh and throughout Ohio.

== Singing career ==
=== Freddy Carlone and Ted Weems ===
In 1932, Como left Canonsburg, moving about 100 miles away to Meadville, Pennsylvania, where his uncle had a barber shop in the Hotel Conneaut. About 80 miles from Cleveland, it was a popular stop on the itinerary for dance bands who worked up and down the Ohio Valley. Como, his girlfriend Roselle, and their friends had gone to nearby Cleveland; their good times took them to the Silver Slipper Ballroom, where Freddy Carlone and his orchestra were playing. Carlone invited anyone who thought he might have talent to come up and sing with his band. Como was terrified, but his friends urged him and pushed him onto the stage. Carlone was so impressed with Como's performance that he immediately offered him a job.

Como was not certain if he should accept Carlone's offer, so he returned to Canonsburg to talk the matter over with his father. Como expected his father would tell him to stay in the barber business, but to Como's surprise, his father said if he did not take the opportunity, he might never know whether or not Como could be a professional singer. The decision was also made with an eye on finances; at this time, Como was earning around $125 per week from his barber shop, while the job with Carlone paid $28 per week. Roselle was willing to travel with her fiancé and the band, but the salary was not enough to support two people on the road. Perry and Roselle were married in Meadville on July 31, 1933; four days later, Como joined Carlone's band and began working with them. Roselle returned home to Canonsburg; Como would be on the road for the next 18 months.

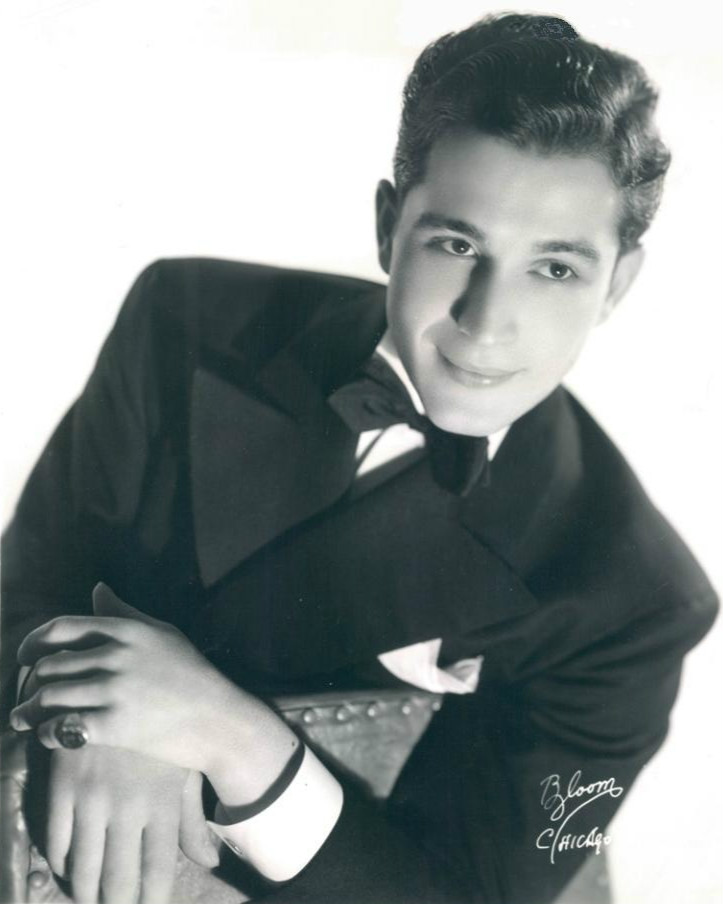
Como in 1939, when he was with the Ted Weems Orchestra

Three years after joining Carlone, Como moved to Ted Weems's Orchestra and his first recording dates. Como and Weems met in 1936 while the Carlone orchestra was playing in Warren, Ohio. Como initially did not take the offer to join Weems's orchestra. Apparently realizing it was the best move for Como, Carlone selflessly urged him to sign with Weems. Art Jarrett had just left the Weems organization to start his own band. Weems was in need of a vocalist; Como got a raise. Weems paid him $50 per week, his first chance for nationwide exposure. Weems and his orchestra were based in Chicago and were regulars on The Jack Benny Program and Fibber McGee and Molly. The Weems band also had its own weekly radio program on the Mutual Broadcasting System during 1936–1937.

From the show, Como acquired polish and his own style with Weems's help. Mutual's Chicago affiliate, WGN radio, threatened to stop carrying the Weems broadcasts from Chicago's Palmer House if his new singer did not improve. Weems had recordings of some of his previous radio programs; one evening he and Como listened to them, and Como was shocked to realize no one could understand the lyrics when he sang. Weems told Como there was no need for him to resort to vocal tricks; what was necessary was to sing from the heart.

Como's first recording with the Weems band was a novelty tune called "You Can't Pull the Wool Over My Eyes", recorded for the Decca Records label in May 1936. During one of Como's early Decca recording sessions with the Weems orchestra, Weems was told to get rid of "that kid" (Como) because he sounded too much like Bing Crosby, who also recorded for Decca. Before Como could reply, Weems spoke up, saying Como was part of the session or it was over. By the time Como had been with Weems about a year, he was mentioned in a 1937 Life magazine NBC Radio ad for Fibber McGee and Molly as "causing cardiac flutters with his crooning". The weekly radio show Beat the Band, which ran on NBC from 1940 to 1944, was a "stump the band"-type musical quiz show on which Weems and his orchestra were featured from 1940 to 1941.

=== RCA Victor and radio ===
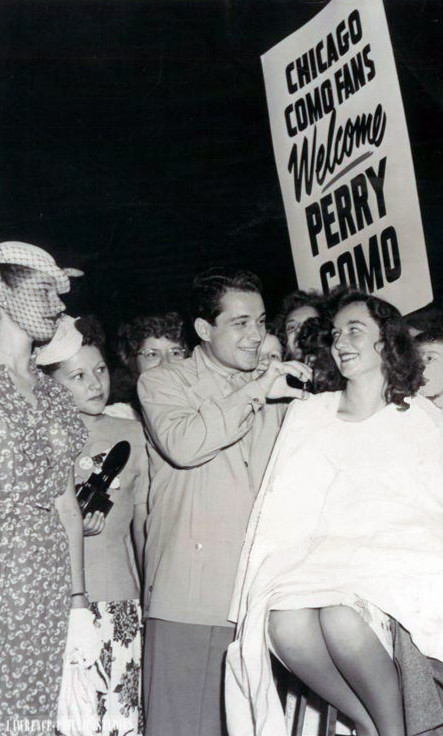
Arriving in Chicago for shows in 1947, Como is met by his fans who get a hair trim along with a song.

The Comos' first child, Ronnie, was born in 1940, while the Weems band was working in Chicago. Como left to be at his wife's side, though he was threatened with dismissal if he did so. Though Como was now making $250 a week and travel expenses for the family were no problem, Ronnie could not become used to a normal routine when they were unable to stay in one place for a period of time. The radio program Beat the Band did not always originate from Chicago, but was often broadcast from other cities such as Milwaukee, Denver, and St. Louis. The band continued to play road engagements while part of the program was broadcast. Como decided life on the road was no place to raise a child, and Roselle and the baby went back to Canonsburg.

In late 1942, Como decided to quit the Weems band, even if it meant giving up singing. Weary of life on the road and missing his wife and son, he returned to Canonsburg, his family, and his trade. Como received an offer to become a Frank Sinatra imitator, but chose to keep his own style. While Como was negotiating for a store lease to reopen a barber shop, he received a call from Tommy Rockwell at General Artists Corporation, who also represented Weems. Como fielded many other calls that also brought offers, but he liked and trusted Rockwell, who was offering him his own sustaining (unsponsored) Columbia Broadcasting System (CBS) radio show and promising to get him a recording contract. The offers were also appealing because it meant staying put in New York with no more road tours. As Como pondered the job offer, Roselle told him, "You can always get another barber shop if it doesn't work out!" Until the radio show and recording contract offers, he did not view singing as his true career, believing the years with Carlone and Weems had been enjoyable but now it was time to get back to work. Como said in a 1983 interview, "I thought I'd have my fun and I'd go home to work."

Perry made his debut radio broadcast for CBS on March 12, 1943. Rockwell's next move was to book Como into the Copacabana nightclub for two weeks beginning on June 10, 1943. At this same time, RCA Victor was looking for a crooner to compete with Sinatra and Crosby; Como signed his first recording contract with RCA Victor and three days after that, cut his first record for the company, "Goodbye, Sue". It was the beginning of a professional relationship that lasted for 44 years. He became a very successful performer in theater and nightclub engagements; Como's initial two weeks at the Copacabana in June stretched into August. Sinatra would sometimes call Como and ask him to fill in for him at his Paramount Theater performances.

The crooning craze was at its height during this time, and the "bobby soxer" and "swooner" teenaged girls who were wild about Sinatra added Como to their list. A "swooners" club voted Perry "Crooner of the Year" in 1943. The line for a Perry Como Paramount performance was three deep and wound around the city block. Como's popularity also extended to a more mature audience when he played the Versailles and returned to the Copacabana, where the management placed "SRO-Swooning Ruled Out" cards on their tables.

Doug Storer, who was an advertising manager with the Blackman Company at the time, became convinced of Como's abilities after hearing him on his unsponsored CBS Radio show. Storer produced a demonstration radio program recording with Como and the Mitchell Ayres Orchestra, which he brought to the advertising agency that handled the Chesterfield Cigarettes account. Initially, the agency liked the format of the show, but wanted someone else as the star, asking Storer to obtain the release of the singer they preferred, so he would be free for their new program. Storer decided to do nothing about getting the singer released from his contract. When he was contacted by the agency some weeks later, saying they were ready to put the program on the air on NBC, Storer bluntly told them the man for their show was the man they had heard on the demo recording. The program was scheduled to make its debut in a week; the only option was to hire Como for the show. Storer then arranged for Como's release from his CBS contract. On December 11, 1944, he moved from CBS to NBC for a new radio program, Chesterfield Supper Club.

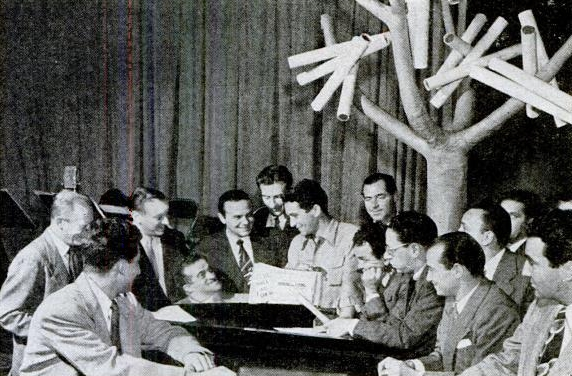
Como meeting with songwriters' representatives in the "Supper Club" studio. He met with the "song pluggers" every Wednesday following the West Coast broadcast of Chesterfield Supper Club.

The April 5, 1946, broadcasts of the Chesterfield Supper Club took place 20,000 feet in the air; these were the first known instances of a complete radio show being presented from an airplane. Como, Jo Stafford, the Lloyd Shaffer Orchestra, and the entire "Supper Club" crew made the flights for the shows. Two "Supper Club" broadcast flights were made that evening: at 6 pm and again at 10 pm for the West Coast broadcast of the show. Three flights were made; an earlier rehearsal flight was made for reception purposes. In addition to the band instruments, the plane also carried a small piano. Because the stand-held microphones were not very useful on the plane, hand-held mikes were used, but they became extremely heavy to hold after a few minutes. This mid-air performance caused the American Federation of Musicians to consider this a new type of engagement and issue a special set of rates for it.

From 1989 until his death in 2001, Como co-hosted a weekly syndicated radio show with John Knox called Weekend With Perry.

=== Como in concert ===
Como had not made a nightclub appearance in 26 years when he accepted an engagement at the International Hotel in Las Vegas in June 1970, which also resulted in his first "live" album, Perry Como in Person at the International Hotel, Las Vegas. Ray Charles, whose Ray Charles Singers were heard with Como for over 35 years, formed a special edition of the vocal group for Como's Vegas opening. Como had last appeared at New York's Copacabana in 1944. Como continued to do periodic engagements in Las Vegas and Lake Tahoe, limiting his nightclub appearances to Nevada.

Performing live again brought Como a new sense of enjoyment. In May 1974, he embarked on his first concert appearance outside the U.S., a show at the London Palladium for the Variety Club of Great Britain to aid children's charities. It was here where he discovered what he had been missing when the audience cheered for ten minutes after he walked onstage. At the show's end, Como sat in a chair, delightedly chatting back and forth with his equally delighted fans. Perry returned to the United Kingdom in November for a Royal Variety Performance to benefit the Entertainment Artistes' Benevolent Fund with Queen Elizabeth The Queen Mother in attendance. Como was invited to visit Buckingham Palace the day after the show. At first, the invitation did not extend to his associates traveling and working with him, and Como politely declined. When word reached the Palace regarding the reason for Perry's turning down the invitation, it was then extended to include the entire Como party and Como accepted. Soon after, he announced his first concert tour that began in the UK in the spring of 1975.

In 1982, Como and Frank Sinatra were invited to entertain Italian President Sandro Pertini at a White House state dinner when he made an official visit. President Pertini enjoyed their performance enough to join them in singing "Santa Lucia". The pair reprised this routine the next year in California as part of the entertainment for Queen Elizabeth's Royal visit. Perry was on the program by special request of the Queen.

In 1984, Como traveled the US with his 50th Anniversary tour. Having spent most of his professional life in radio or recording studios and on television soundstages, he was enjoying doing live performances. Even after his 80th birthday, Como continued the concert tours. Gone, however, were the cardigan sweaters which had been a staple of his weekly television shows, and which he had actually hated wearing. Como now performed in a tuxedo, saying, "It shows respect for the audience."

The return to live appearances also provided Como with an opportunity to have a little fun with his "Mister Nice Guy" image in a song Ray Charles and Nick Perito, his closest collaborator since 1963, wrote and composed for him:

It doesn't take a guy equipped with ESP
To see what's cookin' with your curiosity!
Is "Mister Nice Guy" just a press agent's pitch?
His dearest friends say he's a ...

You never thought you'd see me in Las Vegas "live"
I haven't played a "club" since 1885!
It's spelled out in dollar signs (you better believe it!)
I can almost read your minds!

— Nick Perito and Ray Charles, "If I Could Almost Read Your Mind"

=== Vocal characteristics ===
Como credited Bing Crosby for influencing his voice and style. Como's voice is known for its good-natured vocal acrobatics as portrayed in his novelty songs such as "Hot Diggity (Dog Ziggity Boom)", but there was another side to Como. Music critic Gene Lees describes it in his sleeve note to Como's 1968 album Look To Your Heart:

Despite his immense popularity, Como is rarely given credit for what, once you stop and think of it, he so clearly is: one of the great singers and one of the great artists of our time.

Perhaps the reason people rarely talk about his formidable attributes as a singer is that he makes so little fuss about them. That celebrated ease of his has been too little understood. Ease in any art is the result of mastery over the details of the craft. You get them together to the point where you can forget about how you do things and concentrate on what you are doing. Como got them together so completely that the muscles don't even show. It seems effortless, but a good deal of effort has gone into making it seem so. Como is known to be meticulous about rehearsal of the material for an album. He tries things out in different keys, gives the song thought, makes suggestions, tries it again, and again, until he is satisfied. The hidden work makes him look like Mr. Casual, and too many people are taken in by it—but happily so.

== Film career ==
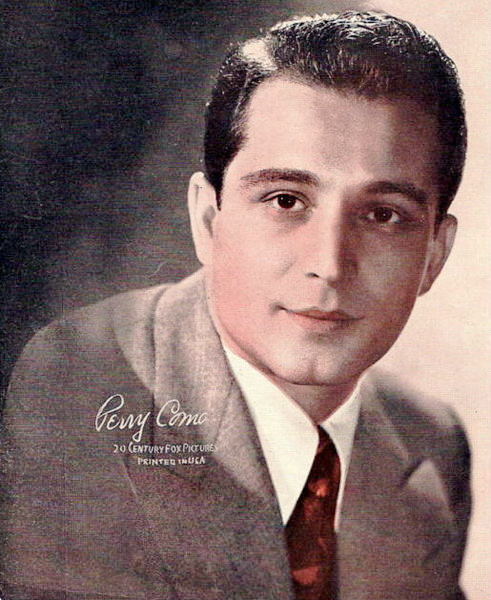
Fox publicity photo of Perry Como

Como's Hollywood-type good looks earned him a seven-year contract with 20th Century-Fox in 1943. He made four films for Fox, Something for the Boys (1944), Upbeat in Music (1945 short musical documentary film, volume 10 episode 5 of the March of Time series), Doll Face (1945), and If I'm Lucky (1946). He also appeared in a single film for Metro-Goldwyn-Mayer, Words and Music (1948). Como never appeared to be truly comfortable in films, feeling the roles assigned him did not match his personality.

A Hollywood press agent sought to alter Como's life story by changing his previous occupation from barber to coal miner, claiming it would make for better press. Fred Othman, a Hollywood columnist, publicly stated that he believed Como the barber was just a publicity gimmick. Como gave him a shave and haircut at the Fox Studios barber shop to prove him wrong. In 1985, Como related the story of his first film role experience in Something for the Boys. He sat ready to work in his dressing room for two weeks without being called. Como spent the next two weeks playing golf, still not missed by the studio. It was five weeks before he was actually called to the set, despite the studio's initial urgent report for work notice. When Como finally appeared, the director had no idea who he was.

At the time Como was signed, musical films were on the wane and he became a studio contract player, where the actors or actresses worked only when the studio needed to fill out a schedule. Though his last film, Words and Music, was made for prestigious Metro-Goldwyn-Mayer, Como fared no better. Less than two weeks before the film's release, Walter Winchell wrote in his syndicated column, "Someone at MGM must have been dozing when they wrote the script for Words and Music. In most of the film Perry Como is called Eddie Anders and toward the end (for no reason) they start calling him Perry Como." Como asked for and received a release from the remainder of his MGM contract later the same year. Quoting Como, "I was wasting their time and they were wasting mine."

Como's comments during a 1949 interview were prophetic, as far as his success was concerned. At the time he was doing the Chesterfield Supper Club on radio and TV, "Television is going to do me a lot more personal good than the movies ever have ... The reason should be obvious. On television, I'm allowed to be myself; in pictures, I was always some other guy. I come over like just another bum in a tuxedo." After he began appearing regularly on television, Como was offered some film roles that interested him, but there was never enough time to pursue any film work.

== Television career ==
=== Early years: 1948–1955 ===
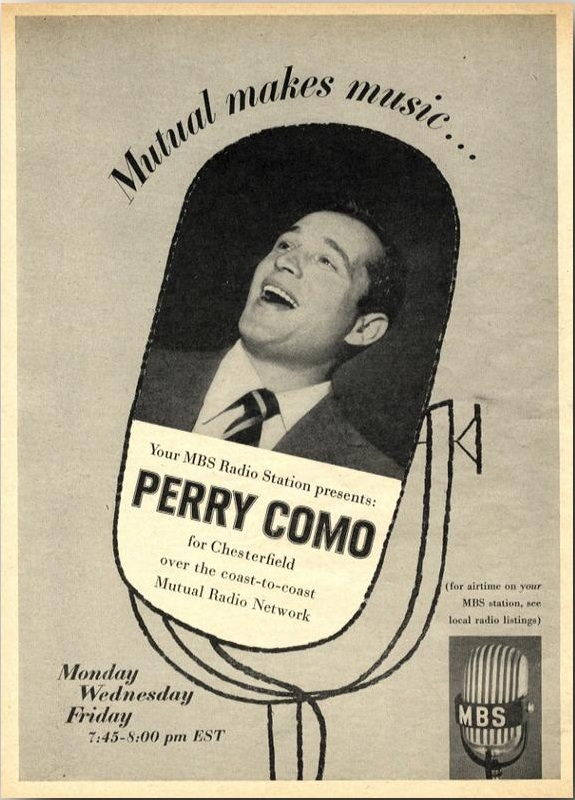
Perry Como for Chesterfield, Mondays, Wednesdays, and Fridays. Mutual Broadcasting System, 1954

Como made the move to television when NBC initially televised the Chesterfield Supper Club radio program on December 24, 1948. A guest on that first show was Como's eight-year-old son, Ronnie, as part of a boys' choir singing "Silent Night" with his father. The show was the usual Friday night Chesterfield Supper Club with an important exception—it was also being broadcast on television. The experimental simulcast was to continue for three Friday "Supper Club" shows, but had gone so well, NBC decided to extend the televised version through August 1949. Years later, Como admitted to being scared and feeling awkward initially but somehow managed to just be himself. Said Como, "You can't act on TV. With me, what you see is what you get." While still in its experimental phase, Como and the television show survived an on location broadcast in Durham, North Carolina, on April 15, 1949.

On September 8, 1949, it became a weekly half-hour offering on Sunday nights, directly opposite Ed Sullivan's Toast of the Town. In 1950, Como moved to CBS and the show's title was changed to The Perry Como Chesterfield Show, again sponsored by Liggett & Myers' Chesterfield cigarettes. Como hosted this informal 15-minute musical variety series on Monday, Wednesday and Friday, following the CBS Television News. The Faye Emerson Show was initially broadcast in the same time slot on Tuesday and Thursday. By 1952, it was evident that television would replace radio as the major entertainment medium. Gary Giddins, the biographer of Bing Crosby, said in 2001, "He (Como) came from this whole generation of crooners—Crosby and Sinatra, but he was the only one of them who figured out TV." Como's 15-minute TV show was simulcast on radio via the Mutual Broadcasting System beginning August 24, 1953; while the Chesterfield Supper Club broadcasts were simulcast on radio and television, this was the first instance of a simulcast between two networks.

Como's CBS contract was to expire on July 1, 1955. The year before, he had been asked to be the master of ceremonies and narrator of the NBC Radio 35th anniversary special. That April, Perry Como signed a 12-year "unbreakable" contract with NBC. On his last CBS show, June 24, 1955, Como was in high spirits, bringing all those who worked off camera on the air for introductions. Como tried his hand at camera work, getting a picture on the air but one that was upside-down. In appreciation for the 11-year association, his sponsor, Chesterfield, presented him with all the musical arrangements used during this time as a parting gift.

=== Sing to me, Mr. C.: 1955–1959 ===
He moved back to NBC with The Perry Como Show, a weekly hour-long variety show featuring additional musical and production numbers, comedy sketches and guest stars, premiering September 17, 1955. This version of his show was also so popular that, in the 1956–1957 television season, it reached ninth in the Nielsen ratings: the only show on NBC that season to land in the top ten.

Como and the Ray Charles Singers on the set of The Perry Como Show during "Sing To Me, Mr. C." segment, c. 1950s. Como's "sweater era".

Como's "Dream Along With Me" became the show's opening theme song. "Mr. C." received "stacks and stacks of letters" requesting him to sing a specific song. Here he also began wearing his trademark cardigan sweaters. The "Sing to me, Mr. C." segment with Como seated on a stool singing viewer-requested songs had its roots in the first television broadcasts of Chesterfield Supper Club. When cameras entered the "Supper Club" radio studio, they found Como and his guests sitting on stools behind music stands. The show's closing theme was "You Are Never Far Away From Me".

Perry's announcer on the broadcasts, Frank Gallop, became a foil for Como's jokes. When the television show began, there was not enough room for Gallop to appear on stage; he was an invisible "voice from the clouds" until the show's 1958–1959 season. There was as much fun at rehearsals as on the show itself. Como's relaxed and fun-loving manner at rehearsals put many nervous guests at ease. It was common for Como to leave the Saturday-afternoon rehearsal for about a half-hour to go to confession. He saved some time by asking his music publisher, Mickey Glass, to wait in line for him at the confessional. Glass, who was Jewish, was most agreeable to this but wondered what to do if his turn came before Como arrived.

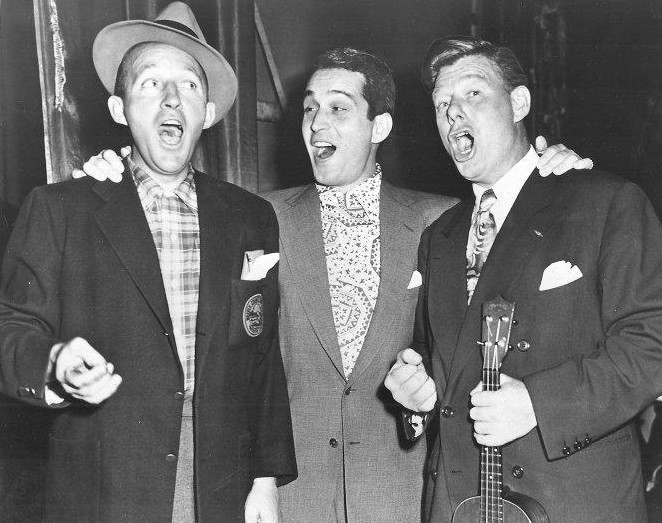
Flanked by Bing Crosby and Arthur Godfrey (1950)

Como thoroughly enjoyed his years working in television, saying in a 1989 interview, "I got a kick out of live television. The spontaneity was the fun of it." Spontaneity and the ability to be himself came in handy for swimmer/actress Esther Williams's guest appearance of March 16, 1957. A wardrobe malfunction showed viewers more of Esther than 1950s television considered to be in good taste; more live show mishaps followed. At the show's end, Williams was swimming in a pool specially constructed on the set for her appearance. Como simply said, "Goodnight, folks", and leaped, fully clothed, into the swimming pool.

On December 17, 1955, viewers were able to see first-hand what Como did for a living before he was a professional singer. Actor Kirk Douglas was one of Como's television guests; Douglas had grown a beard for his Vincent van Gogh role in Lust for Life, which finished filming that week. Como shaved Douglas's beard live on national television. On September 15, 1956, the season premiere of The Perry Como Show was broadcast from NBC's new color television studio at the New York Ziegfeld Theatre, making it one of the first weekly color TV shows. In addition to this season premiere as a color television show, there was also a royal visit from Prince Rainier of Monaco and his bride of six months, Grace Kelly. Como competed with Jackie Gleason in what was billed as the "Battle of the Giants" and won. This is rarely mentioned, in part because Como commonly downplayed his achievements and because the two men were friends. The weekly ratings winner would phone the loser for some mock gloating. At the height of this television competition, Como asked Gleason a favor: to visit his home when his mother-in-law, a big Gleason fan, was there. Though Mrs. Belline spoke no English and Gleason no Italian, Roselle's mother was thrilled. Como told Gleason after the visit, "Anything you want, you got it. In fact, I'll even do one of your shows so the ratings will be better." Como was among those who filled in for Gleason on The Jackie Gleason Show in 1954 when the entertainer suffered a broken ankle and leg in an on-air fall.

An example of Como's popularity came in 1956, when Life conducted a poll of young women, asking them which man in public life most fit the concept of their ideal husband: it was Perry Como. A 1958 nationwide poll of U.S. teenagers found Como to be the most popular male singer, beating Elvis Presley, who was the winner of the previous year's poll. At one point, his television show was broadcast in at least 12 other countries.

Another way to judge the value of the Como show to the network can be found in the following: during sound checks at rehearsals, it was often difficult to hear Como's soft voice without having a large microphone ruin a camera shot. NBC had RCA design a microphone for the show—the RCA Type BK-10A—which was known as the "Como mic"; it was able to pick up Como's voice properly and was small enough not to interfere with camera shots.

=== Kraft Music Hall: 1959–1967 ===
In 1959, Como signed a $25 million deal with Kraft Foods and moved to Wednesday nights, hosting Perry Como's Kraft Music Hall weekly for the next four years. Over the next four seasons, from 1963 to 1967, the series was presented as monthly specials alternating with Kraft Suspense Theatre, The Andy Williams Show, and finally The Road West. Como became the highest-paid performer in the history of television to that date, earning mention in the Guinness Book of World Records. Como himself took part in none of this; his production company, Roncom, named for son Ronald Como, handled the transaction along with all other Como business matters. Como also had control of the show which would replace his during the summer television hiatus. While "Mr. C." was having a holiday, viewers would see Perry Presents, beginning in 1959.

In late 1962, after the Cuban Missile Crisis had settled well enough to permit the evacuated servicemen's families to return to Guantanamo Bay Naval Base in Cuba, Secretary of Defense Robert McNamara was eager to do more for morale there. He asked Como to bring his television show to the Naval base. Como and his cast and crew were at Guantanamo when the families of the armed forces began their return. The first entertainers to visit the base since the crisis, the Como show filmed there for eight days. Some highlights of the program, which was seen in the US on December 12, 1962, included Como's shaving a serviceman with a Castro-like beard and the enthusiastic participation when Perry asked for volunteers to come on stage to do the twist with the lovely ladies who were part of the visiting dance troupe.

Filming for the Kraft Music Hall Christmas show that was aired on December 17, 1964, began at the Vatican November 7. By special permission of Pope Paul VI, Como and his crew shot segments in the Vatican gardens and other areas where cameras had never been permitted previously. The show featured the first television appearance of the Sistine Chapel Choir, and also the first time a non-choir member (Como) sang with them. The choir performed a Christmas hymn in Latin written by their director, Domenico Bartolucci, called "Christ Is Born", as part of their presentation. Como asked his associate, Ray Charles, to write English lyrics for the song, using it many times on both television shows and his Christmas albums. The Carpenters also recorded the song on their first Christmas album, Christmas Portrait.

=== Specials ===
In 1967, Como began reducing his TV appearances, gradually becoming limited to seasonal and holiday specials with the emphasis being on Christmas. A large part of Como's public persona was the idea that he personally knew Santa Claus. Como had numerous Christmas television specials, beginning on Christmas Eve 1948, and continuing to 1994, when his final Christmas special was recorded in Ireland. They were recorded in many countries, including Israel, Mexico, and Canada, as well as many locations throughout the United States, including a Colonial America Christmas in Williamsburg, Virginia. The 1987 Christmas special was cancelled at the behest of an angry Como; the American Broadcasting Company (ABC) was willing to offer him only a Saturday 10 PM time slot for it three weeks before the holiday. Como filled the yearly gap for his fans with live Christmas concerts in various locations.

Como's final Christmas special was filmed in January 1994 in Dublin's Point Theatre before an audience of 4,500, including Irish President Mary Robinson and Como's friend, the actress Maureen O'Hara. Perry Como's Irish Christmas was a Public Broadcasting Service (PBS) production, made by an Irish independent production company in association with RTÉ. Como, appearing aged and unwell, had the flu during the show, which took four hours to record. At the show's conclusion, Como apologized to his Dublin audience for a performance he felt was not up to his usual standards. During his visit to Dublin, Como visited a barber shop called "The Como" on Thomas Street. The owners, lifelong fans who named their business in his honor, had sent photographs of the shop and letters to Como inviting him to visit. Photos of Como with the barbers were framed in the shop. "The Como" closed in 2002, but it remains a household name in The Liberties.

== Personal life ==
=== Marriage and family ===
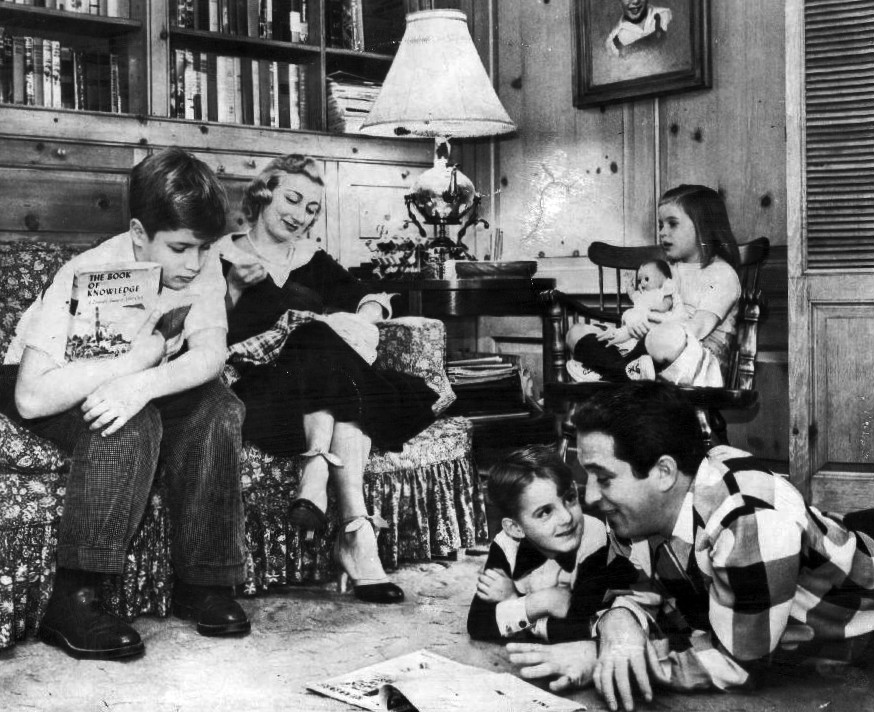
The Comos at home c. 1955. On the sofa are his elder son Ronnie and wife Roselle. In the chair is his daughter, Terri, and on the floor are Perry and son David.

In 1929, the 17-year-old Como met Roselle Belline at a picnic on Chartiers Creek that attracted many young people from the Canonsburg area. Como, who attended the cookout with another girl, did not spot Roselle until everyone was around the campfire singing and the gathering was coming to a close. When it came Como's turn to sing, he chose "More Than You Know", with his eyes on Roselle for the entire song. They were married July 31, 1933. They raised three children, Ronnie, David, and Terri. Because Como believed his professional life and his personal life should be kept separate, he declined repeated interview requests from Edward R. Murrow's Person to Person.

In 1946, Como moved to Flower Hill, New York.

In 1958, the Comos celebrated their silver wedding anniversary with a family trip to Italy. On the itinerary was an audience with Pope Pius XII. Como, who sat in a side wing of the Long Island church where he attended Sunday Mass in an effort to avoid attracting attention, was both puzzled and upset on returning home that photos from the visit made the newspapers throughout the world. A thorough check of the Como and NBC publicity offices found neither was responsible; the photos had been released by the Vatican's press department. When Perry and Roselle became Knight Commander and Lady Commander of the Equestrian Order of the Holy Sepulchre in 1952, it was a news item only after Archbishop Fulton J. Sheen, who had been honored at the same ceremony, mentioned it some time later.

In 1971 while taping Perry Como's Winter Show in Hollywood, Como suffered a debilitating fall from a stage platform. X-rays showed no serious injury to his knee, but by the next morning it was swollen to twice its normal size. Como chartered a jet to his home and doctors in Florida, where a second exam showed the knee was seriously broken. His knee was re-set and placed in a cast; recuperation took eight months. In 1993, he was successfully treated for bladder cancer.

After 65 years of marriage, Roselle died August 12, 1998, at age 84. Como was devastated by her death.

=== Public persona ===
One of the many factors in his success was Como's insistence on his principles of good taste; if he considered something to be in bad or questionable taste, it was not in the show or broadcast. When a line written for Julius La Rosa about television personality Arthur Godfrey on The Perry Como Show was misconstrued, Como offered an on-air apology at the beginning of his next show, against the advice of his staff. While his performance of "Ave Maria" was a tradition of his holiday television programs, Como refused to sing it at live performances, saying, "It's not the time or place to do it", even though it was the number-one request of his audiences.

Como nurtured a public image as an everyday man. From his first Chesterfield Supper Club TV show, if scripts were written at all, they were based on Como's everyday manner of speaking. Though Como was widely known for his amiability, laid-back and easygoing style, he was not devoid of a temper, and it could be seen at times as a result of the frustrations of daily life. Mitchell Ayres, his musical director from 1948 to 1963, said, "Perry has a temper like everyone else. And he loses his temper at the normal things everyone else does. When we're driving, for instance, and somebody cuts him off, he really lets the offender have it."

Bing Crosby once described Como as "the man who invented casual". His preference for casual clothing did not keep him from being named one of the Best Dressed Men beginning in 1946, and continuing long after Como stopped appearing on weekly television. Como also had his own line of sports/casual men's clothing made by Bucknell c. early 1950s.

=== Hobbies ===
Como was an avid and accomplished golfer; there was always time to try getting in a golf game. He was a member of the Garden City Country Club and won the club championship in September 1954. "Perry Como Putters" were sold by MacGregor, each stamped with a Como facsimile autograph. His colleagues held an annual Perry Como Golf Tournament to honor him and his love for the game. Como's guests on the October 3, 1962, broadcast were Jack Nicklaus, Arnold Palmer, and Gary Player. The four golfers played 18 holes for the cameras at Sands Point, New York, where the Comos made their home in the television years. Como also enjoyed fishing and he could be found out on his boat almost daily after the family moved to Florida. Perry's catches would usually turn out to be the Como family's dinners. Como also used his boat as a rehearsal hall with pre-recorded instrumental tapes sent to him by RCA Victor. Como would work on material while he was waiting for the fish to bite. Having enjoyed golfing and fishing in the North Carolina mountains for several years, Como built a vacation home in Saluda, North Carolina, in 1980. He discouraged photos of his home, as it was his private place to get away from celebrity life.

== Death ==
Como died in his sleep on May 12, 2001, at his home in Jupiter Inlet Colony, Florida, aged 88. He was reported to have suffered from symptoms of Alzheimer's disease. Como's elder son, Ronnie, and his daughter, Terri, could not agree on their interpretations of Como's 1999 living will and it became a matter for the courts in the year before his death. His funeral Mass took place at St. Edward's Catholic Church in Palm Beach, Florida. Como and his wife, Roselle, are buried at Riverside Memorial Park, Tequesta, Palm Beach County, Florida.

== Discography ==
Studio albums

- Perry Como Sings Merry Christmas Music (1946)
- A Sentimental Date with Perry (1948)
- Supper Club Favorites (1949)
- TV Favorites (1952)
- Hits from Broadway Shows (1953)
- Around the Christmas Tree (1953)
- I Believe – Songs of All Faiths Sung by Perry Como (1953)
- So Smooth (1955)
- We Get Letters (1957)
- Saturday Night with Mr. C (1958)
- When You Come to the End of the Day (1958)
- Como Swings (1959)
- Seasons Greetings from Perry Como (1959)
- For the Young at Heart (1961)
- Sing to Me Mr. C (1961)
- By Request (1962)
- The Best of Irving Berlin's Songs from Mr. President (1962)
- The Songs I Love (1963)
- The Scene Changes (1965)
- Lightly Latin (1966)
- Perry Como In Italy (1966)
- The Perry Como Christmas Album (1968)
- Look to Your Heart (1968)
- Seattle (1969)
- It's Impossible (1970)
- I Think of You (1971)
- And I Love You So (1973)
- Perry (1974)
- Just Out of Reach (1975)
- The Best of British (1977)
- Where You're Concerned (1978)
- Perry Como (1980)
- So It Goes / Goodbye for Now (1983)
- Today (1987)

== Honors and tributes ==
=== Awards ===
Como received the 1959 Grammy Award for Best Vocal Performance, Male; five Emmys from 1955 to 1959; a Christopher Award (1956) and shared a Peabody Award with good friend Jackie Gleason in 1956. He was inducted into the Academy of Television Arts & Sciences Hall of Fame in 1990 and received a Kennedy Center Honor in 1987. Posthumously, Como received the Grammy Lifetime Achievement Award in 2002; he was inducted into the Long Island Music Hall of Fame in 2006. Como has the distinction of having three stars on the Hollywood Walk of Fame for his work in radio, television, and music.

=== Tributes ===
In the official RCA Records Billboard memorial, his life was summed up in these words: "50 years of music and a life well lived. An example to all." Composer Ervin Drake said of him, "... [o]ccasionally someone like Perry comes along and won't 'go with the flow' and still prevails in spite of all the bankrupt others who surround him and importune him to yield to their values. Only occasionally."

=== Hometown honors ===
Canonsburg has always been very proud to be the birthplace of Perry Como; the local newspaper of the time, Canonsburg Daily Notes, seems to have been the first to write an article about him. Their edition of July 19, 1934, featured a photo and the following: "A young Canonsburg boy threatens to snatch the crown from Bing Crosby's head. Perry Como, son of Mr. and Mrs. Pietro Como of 530 Franklin Ave. is said to have one of the grandest baritone voices in the country." The borough honored him three times over the course of his life. The first of these events took place September 14, 1946, when Third Street, where Perry worked in the barber shop of Steve Fragapane, was renamed "Perry Como Avenue". Perry, Roselle, and Como's mother, Lucy, attended the ceremonies and banquet held at the State Armory.

A second ceremony marking Perry Como Day took place August 24, 1977, but the most ambitious project began in 1997 – a statue of the singer. The planned statue had the blessing of Como's wife, Roselle, who died the year before it was unveiled on May 15, 1999. As part of the festivities, Como's stool and music stand from The Perry Como Show and the equipment he used at Steve Fragapane's barber shop were donated to the borough. Como was not present at the unveiling because of poor health. The inscription on the base, "To This Place God Has Brought Me", was a favorite saying of Como's; the musical feature was added in 2002.

The Como celebration crossed the Atlantic in August 2002. Palena, Italy, the birthplace of Como's parents, had a long-standing week-long festival in honor of the singer. A smaller version of the statue was taken to Palena by the mayor of Canonsburg, Anthony Colaizzo. Perry's son, David, and his wife were also in attendance when the town of Palena renamed a street for Como. Dating from these ceremonies, there is a marble plaque on a Palena town wall stating that Pietro and Lucia Como, parents of Perry Como, emigrated from this village to the United States.

Perry Como never forgot Canonsburg. One of the things he did to give a helping hand to his home town was to convince RCA to open a record-pressing plant there. Those who needed to raise funds for local projects such as Boys' and Girls' Clubs found him always ready to do whatever was needed.

In 2007, the local McDonald's was rebuilt. The building includes memorabilia of Como and another Canonsburg native, Bobby Vinton. A children's playground in Canonsburg on Giffin Avenue is also named for Como. In downtown Canonsburg, all of the tree grates are marked with information about the records that sold a million copies and the town clock hourly plays one of the hits of Como (141), Vinton (44), or the Four Coins (7), also from Canonsburg.

== See also ==
- Category:Perry Como albums
- List of best-selling music artists
- List of musicians
- List of songs recorded by Perry Como
- Perry Como television and radio shows

== Works cited ==
- Bloom, Ken (2005). The American Songbook: The Singers, the Songwriters, and the Songs. Black Dog & Leventhal. ISBN 978-1-5791-2448-9.
- Brooks, Tim; Marsh, Earle F. (2009). The Complete Directory to Prime Time Network and Cable TV Shows, 1946–Present. Random House. ISBN 978-0-3074-8320-1.
- Carnes, Mark C. (2008). American National Biography: Supplement 2. Oxford University Press (US). ISBN 978-0-1952-2202-9.
- Dunning, John (1998). On the Air: The Encyclopedia of Old-Time Radio. Oxford University Press (US). p. 75. ISBN 978-0-1950-7678-3.
- Escott, Colin (2002). Roadkill on the Three-chord Highway: Art and Trash in American Popular Music. Psychology Press. ISBN 978-0-4159-3782-5.
- Graybill, Guy (2008). Bravo!: Greatness of Italian Music. Brandon Books. ISBN 978-09-3783-2493.
- Greffenstette, Jerry (2009). Canonsburg. Arcadia Publishing. ISBN 978-0-7385-6533-0.
- Grudens, Richard (2004). The Italian Crooners Bedside Companion. Celebrity Profiles. ISBN 978-0-9763-8770-1.
- Hemming, Roy; Hajdu, David (1999). Discovering Great Singers of Classic Pop: A New Listener's Guide to the Sounds and Lives of the Top Performers. Newmarket Press. p. 298. ISBN 978-1-5570-4148-7.
- LaGumina, Salvatore; Cavaioli, Frank J. (2003). The Italian American Experience: An Encyclopedia. Routledge. ISBN 978-1-1355-8333-0.
- Macfarlane, Malcolm (2009). Perry Como: A Biography and Complete Career Record. McFarland & Company. ISBN 978-0-7864-7166-9.
- Mackenzie, Harry (1999). The Directory of the Armed Forces Radio Service Series. Greenwood Publishing Group. ISBN 978-0-3133-0812-3.
- Simon, George T. (2012). The Big Bands. Music Sales Group. ISBN 978-0-8571-2812-6.
- Sinatra, Nancy (1985). Frank Sinatra: My Father. Simon & Schuster. ISBN 978-0-6716-2508-5.
