= Greetings from Less Than Jake =

EP by Less Than Jake
- Released: June 20, 2011
- Recorded: The Moathouse, 2011
- Genre: Ska punk; punk rock; pop punk
- Length: 14:07
- Language: English
- Label: Sleep It Off
- Producer: Roger Lima

Less Than Jake chronology
TV/EP (2010)	Greetings from Less Than Jake (2011)	Seasons Greetings from Less Than Jake (2012)

Greetings from Less Than Jake is an EP by American ska-punk band Less Than Jake, released on June 20, 2011 on their own label, Sleep It Off Records. Described as the band's "287th release," the EP was released to coincide with their appearance on the Warped Tour 2011, and was subsequently followed by Seasons Greetings from Less Than Jake, in February 2012. In October 2012, the two EPs were combined to create the full-length album, Greetings and Salutations (2012).

== Background and recording ==
Greetings from Less Than Jake was recorded at bassist and vocalist Roger Manganelli's home studio, The Moathouse, with Manganelli producing under the pseudonym, Roger Lima. Regarding the EP's recording sessions, trombonist Buddy Schaub noted, "Working on this record was a nice breath of fresh air for our band in that no one else was involved at all this time around. It’s been a long time since we’ve done a record with no outside involvement at all such as a producer or label schmooks tossing in their opinions here and there. We recorded everything at Roger’s studio, and got done with everything: writing, recording, mixing, and mastering in only a couple of months."

Discussing the notion of there being unreleased tracks from the recording sessions, saxophonist and backing vocalist Peter "JR" Wasilewski noted, "There were songs, but they weren’t full, thought-out ideas. They were chord progressions and things. Writing is constant with us, so they might be used in our next release." It is unknown if any of these song ideas appear on the EP's follow-up, Seasons Greetings from Less Than Jake.

== Release ==
The EP was released on June 20, 2011, and had previously been unannounced. Regarding the decision to record an EP, as opposed to a full-length album, saxophonist and backing vocalist Peter "JR" Wasilewski noted, "I think releasing full records these days is kind of retarded. We just come up with different ways to release a record. I’m not trying to call people out, but there are a lot of things in modern music right now that are totally bumming me out. [...] As far as releasing songs, as you get older people care less and less about what you do now. It’s more about what you’ve already done, and we’ve realized that. The term legacy act applies to our band when you refer to Less Than Jake. We do work really hard on our new songs though compared to our contemporaries, and we’re one of the few of them that do that. It’s not going be the best of the best, but it’s pretty good. Kids get it for free anyway. We’re trying to find new ways to put things out." Similarly, trombonist Buddy Schaub stated, "These days an EP is plenty for people to digest. It trims the fat so to speak. Putting out five quality songs is better than ten mediocre songs. And with our schedules and Roger’s studio, going in to bust out five songs at a time keeps the frequency of music into the fan’s hands at a peak."

== Track listing ==
All songs written by Less Than Jake.

1. "Can't Yell Any Louder" - 1:41
2. "Goodbye, Mr. Personality" - 3:30
3. "Harvey Wallbanger" - 3:06
4. "Oldest Trick in the Book" - 3:10
5. "Life Lived Out Loud" - 2:40

== Personnel ==
=== Less Than Jake ===
- Chris Demakes - vocals, guitar
- Roger Lima - vocals, bass guitar
- Peter "JR" Wasilewski - saxophone, vocals
- Buddy Schaub - trombone
- Vinnie Fiorello - drums

=== Recording personnel ===
- Roger Lima - producer, recording
- Stephen Egerton - mixing, mastering

=== Artwork ===
- JP Flexner
