= To Know You (Is to Love You) =

Single by Perry Como
- B-side: "My Lady Loves To Dance"
- Released: September 9, 1952
- Genre: traditional pop
- Length: 2:17
- Label: RCA Victor
- Composer: Robert Allen
- Lyricist: Allan Roberts

"To Know You (Is to Love You)" is a popular song. The music was written by Robert Allen, the lyrics by Allan Roberts. The song was published in 1952.

The best-known recording of the song was made by Perry Como. It was first recorded on June 19, 1952, as a duet with Betty Hutton which was never released; Como and The Fontane Sisters with Michell Ayres' and his orchestra redid the song on September 9, 1952. This second recording was released as a 78 rpm single in the United States by RCA Victor Records (catalog number 20-4959, with the flip side "My Lady Loves to Dance") and in the United Kingdom by His Master's Voice in January 1953 (catalog number B-10400, with the flip side "Don't Let the Stars Get In Your Eyes"). The US version reached number 19 on the Billboard charts.

Another recording was made by Como of the song on May 21, 1959. This version was done for the album Como Swings.
