= Sing to Me Mr. C =

Studio album by Perry Como
- Released: July 1961
- Recorded: May 15 & 17, 1961
- Genre: Vocal
- Length: 43:50
- Label: RCA Victor
- Producer: Hugo & Luigi

Perry Como chronology
For the Young at Heart (1960)	Sing to Me Mr. C (1961)	By Request (1962)

Professional ratings
Review scores
Source	Rating
AllMusic	3/5 stars

Sing to Me Mr. C was Perry Como's eighth RCA Victor 12" long-play album. Joe Lipman was the chief music arranger for the release.

== Overview ==
Sing to Me Mr. C was recorded in the same manner as the medley segments on Perry Como's popular Wednesday night NBC-TV show, complete with performances of his opening and closing themes, plus six medleys of three full songs each. The recording time of the album was nearly 43 minutes, which was unusually long for a typical pop album of that time. Most Hugo & Luigi produced albums are known for being cohesive and well-constructed, and most critics agreed that the material was chosen well, with the album featuring many popular standards.

== Chart performance ==
The album peaked at No. 103 and No. 50 on Billboard's Best Selling Monaural LP's and Best Selling Stereo LP's charts, respectively, in October 1961. It was his first album to chart in three years.

== Track listing ==
=== Side one ===
1. "Sing to Me Mr. C" (Words and Music by Ray Charles)
2. "All By Myself" (Words and Music by Irving Berlin)
3. "I've Grown Accustomed to Her Face" (Music by Frederick Loewe and lyrics by Alan Jay Lerner)
4. "So In Love" (Words and Music by Cole Porter)
5. "Say It Isn't So" (Words and Music by Irving Berlin)
6. "Blue Skies" (Words and Music by Irving Berlin)
7. "Here's That Rainy Day" (Music by Jimmy Van Heusen with lyrics by Johnny Burke)
8. "All I Do Is Dream of You" (Music by Nacio Herb Brown and lyrics by Arthur Freed)
9. "Gigi" (Music by Frederick Loewe and lyrics by Alan Jay Lerner)
10. "The Way You Look Tonight" (Music by Jerome Kern and lyrics by Dorothy Fields)

=== Side two ===
1. "Sing to Me Mr. C" (The Ray Charles Singers)
2. "Thank Heaven for Little Girls" (Music by Frederick Loewe and lyrics by Alan Jay Lerner)
3. "You Were Meant For Me" (Music by Nacio Herb Brown and lyrics by Arthur Freed)
4. "A Fellow Needs a Girl" (Music by Richard Rodgers and lyrics by Oscar Hammerstein II)
5. "You Alone (Solo Tu)" (Music by Robert Allen and lyrics by Al Stillman)
6. "I'm Gonna Sit Right Down and Write Myself a Letter" (Music by Fred E. Ahlert and Joe Young)
7. "A Portrait of My Love" (Music by Cyril Ornadel and lyrics by David West)
8. "Smile" (Music by Charles Chaplin, lyrics by John Turner and Geoffrey Parsons)
9. "How Deep Is the Ocean?" (Words and Music by Irving Berlin)
10. "This Nearly Was Mine" (Music by Richard Rodgers and lyrics by Oscar Hammerstein II)

Closing theme:

1. "You Are Never Far Away from Me" (Music by Robert Allen and lyrics by Allan Roberts)

== Charts ==
Chart (1961)	Peak position
US Billboard Top LP's: Monaural	103
US Billboard Top LP's: Stereo	50
