= For the Young at Heart =

Studio album by Perry Como
- Released: December 1960
- Recorded: October 25, 26 & November 2, 15, 1960
- Genre: Vocal
- Length: 31:33
- Label: RCA Victor
- Producer: Hugo & Luigi

Perry Como chronology
Seasons Greetings from Perry Como (1959)	For the Young at Heart (1960)	Sing to Me Mr. C (1961)

Professional ratings
Review scores
Source	Rating
Allmusic	4/5 stars

For the Young at Heart was Perry Como's seventh RCA Victor 12" long-play album, released in 1960. For the Young at Heart was a concept album with all the songs having "Young" in their title. It is also the first Perry Como album produced by Hugo & Luigi.

The producers Hugo Peretti and Luigi Creatore banned strings from the studio, instead employing a nine-piece horn section, a prominent rhythm section with much guitar, and an ever-present chorus. The arrangements by O.B. Masingill, although uncredited, are quite unique, bright and uptempo with a touch of swing.

== Track listing ==
Side one
No.	Title	Lyrics	Music	Length
1.	"When You and I Were Young, Maggie"	George W. Johnson; J. A. Butterfield	Johnson; Butterfield	2:18
2.	"Young at Heart"	Carolyn Leigh	Johnny Richards	2:54
3.	"I Was Young and Foolish"	Dick Manning	Manning	2:41
4.	"Too Young"	Sylvia Dee	Sidney Lippman	2:34
5.	"You Make Me Feel So Young"	Mack Gordon	Joseph Myrow	2:33
6.	"Like Young"	Paul Francis Webster	André Previn	2:52

Side two
No.	Title	Lyrics	Music	Length
1.	"Hello, Young Lovers"	Oscar Hammerstein II	Richard Rodgers	2:46
2.	"Especially for The Young"	Manny Curtis	Ben Weisman	2:13
3.	"Too Young to Go Steady"	Harold Adamson	Jimmy McHugh	2:27
4.	"While We're Young"	Bill Engvick	Alec Wilder; Morty Palitz	2:56
5.	"Young Love"	Ric Cartey; Carole Joyner	Cartey; Joyner	2:41
6.	"When Hearts are Young"	Cyrus Wood	Sigmund Romberg; Al Goodman	2:18
Total length:				31:13
