= Como Swings =

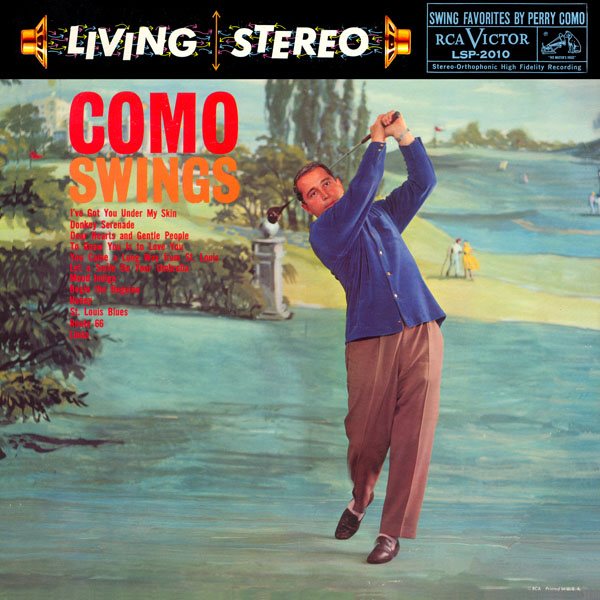

Studio album by Perry Como
- Released: June 1959
- Recorded: April 9, 16, 23 and May 21, 1959
- Genre: Vocal
- Length: 34:56
- Label: RCA Victor
- Producer: Charles Grean, Lee Schapiro

Perry Como chronology
| When You Come to the End of the Day (1958) | Como Swings (1959) | Seasons Greetings from Perry Como (1959) |

Professional ratings
Review scores
| Source | Rating |
|---|---|
| Allmusic | 4/5 stars |

Como Swings was Perry Como's fifth RCA Victor 12" long-play album, released in 1959. The album's concept was one of lively swing arrangements by Joe Lipman of standards from the Great American Songbook. The album was, in part, recorded to showcase the spectacular sound of RCA Victor's new Living Stereo recording process.

== Track listing ==
Side one

1. "St. Louis Blues" (Words and music by W. C. Handy) - 2:57
2. "I've Got You Under My Skin" (Words and music by Cole Porter) - 2:12
3. "Route 66" (Words and music by Bobby Troup) - 3:51
4. "Dear Hearts and Gentle People" (Music by Sammy Fain and lyrics by Bob Hilliard) - 2:49
5. "Mood Indigo" (Words and music by Duke Ellington) - 3:12
6. "The Donkey Serenade" (Music by Rudolf Friml, Herbert Stothart, Robert Wright and George Forrest) - 2:43

Side two

1. "To Know You" (Music by Robert Allen and lyrics by Allan Roberts) - 2:17
2. "You Came a Long Way from St. Louis" (Music by John Benson Brooks and lyrics by Bob Russell) - 3:07
3. "Honey, Honey (Bless Your Heart)" (Music by Larry Stock and lyrics by Dominick Belline) - 2:00
4. "Let a Smile Be Your Umbrella" (Music by Sammy Fain, Irving Kahal and Francis Wheeler) - 3:03
5. "Linda" (Words and music by Jack Lawrence) - 2:46
6. "Begin the Beguine" (Words and music by Cole Porter) - 3:27
