= Greetings & Salutations from Less Than Jake =

Compilation album by Less Than Jake
- Released: October 15, 2012
- Recorded: The Moathouse, 2011-2012
- Genre: Ska punk; punk rock
- Length: 34:17
- Label: Fat Wreck Chords
- Producer: Roger Lima

Less Than Jake chronology
Seasons Greetings from Less Than Jake (2012)	Greetings & Salutations from Less Than Jake (2012)	See the Light (2013)

Professional ratings
Review scores
Source	Rating
Punknews.org	3.5/5 stars

Greetings & Salutations from Less Than Jake is a compilation album by American ska punk band Less Than Jake, released on October 15, 2012 in the UK and January 8, 2013 in the US. Produced by vocalist and bass guitarist Roger Manganelli, the album combines two previously released EPs, Greetings from Less Than Jake (2011) and Seasons Greetings from Less Than Jake (2012), along with two new tracks recorded during the same sessions ("Flag Holders Union" and "View from the Middle"). "Goodbye, Mr. Personality" was released as a single on August 22, 2012.

== Background and recording ==
In the summer of 2011, Less Than Jake released a limited edition EP, entitled Greetings from Less Than Jake, with a follow-up, Seasons Greetings from Less Than Jake, arriving in early 2012. In October 2012, the band decided to combine the two to create a full-length album. The band's US label, Fat Wreck Chords stated, "Over the last year, Less Than Jake sold a couple of new EPs on tour. Unfortunately, with the reach of the new EPs limited to those who could attend a show, and with some of their strongest material in years, it seemed like a proper album was in order. So the band assembled the two EPs, added two previously unreleased bonus tracks, and re-sequenced everything into one cohesive record, Greetings and Salutations."

== Track listing ==
1. "The New Auld Lang Syne"
2. "Younger Lungs"
3. "Goodbye, Mr. Personality"
4. "A Return to Headphones"
5. "Harvey Wallbanger"
6. "Flag Holders Union"
7. "Can't Yell Any Louder"
8. "View from the Middle"
9. "Oldest Trick in the Book"
10. "Done and Dusted"
11. "Finer Points of Forgiveness"
12. "Life Led Out Loud"

== Personnel ==
=== Less Than Jake ===
- Chris DeMakes – vocals, guitar
- Roger Lima – vocals, bass
- Vinnie Fiorello – drums
- Buddy Schaub – trombone
- Peter "JR" Wasilewski – saxophone

=== Recording personnel ===
- Roger Manganelli – producer, recording
- Stephen Egerton – mixing, mastering

=== Artwork ===
- JP Flexner
