= Season's Greetings from Perry Como =

Studio album by Perry Como
- Released: October 1959
- Recorded: July 13, 14 and 15, 1959
- Genre: Vocal
- Label: RCA Victor
- Producer: Charles Grean, Lee Schapiro

Perry Como chronology
| Como Swings (1959) | Season's Greetings from Perry Como (1959) | For the Young at Heart (1960) |

Professional ratings
Review scores
| Source | Rating |
|---|---|
| AllMusic | 3/5 stars |

Season's Greetings from Perry Como, originally released in 1959, was Perry Como's sixth RCA Victor 12-inch long-play album and the fourth recorded in stereophonic sound, as well as his first major full-length Christmas album.

== Overview ==
The album is warm and relaxed, featuring lush renditions of "Winter Wonderland", "The Christmas Song", "O Holy Night" and seven other Christmas tunes (including a re-recording of Como's own 1954 hit, "Home for the Holidays"). Como is accompanied on the tracks by Mitchell Ayres' orchestra and the Ray Charles Singers.

The album charted many times, with the best position being in 1960, when it reached No. 22 on the Billboard Top LPs chart. More recently, it reached No. 110 in 2021.

== Track listing ==
Side one

1. "(There's No Place Like) Home for the Holidays" (Words and music by Robert Allen and Al Stillman)
2. "Winter Wonderland" (Words and music by Felix Bernard and Richard B. Smith)
3. "Rudolph the Red-Nosed Reindeer" (Words and music by Johnny Marks)
4. "The Christmas Song" (Words and music by Mel Tormé and Robert Wells)
5. "Santa Claus Is Comin' to Town" (Words and music by Haven Gillespie and J. Fred Coots)
6. "White Christmas" (Words and music by Irving Berlin)

Side two

1. "Here We Come A-Caroling"/"We Wish You a Merry Christmas" (Traditional arranged by Ray Charles)
2. "God Rest Ye Merry, Gentlemen" (Traditional Christmas music)
3. "O Holy Night" (Words and music by Adolphe Adam)
4. "O Little Town of Bethlehem" (Words and music by Phillips Brooks and Lewis Redner)
5. "Come, Come, Come to the Manger" (Traditional Christmas music adapted by Mitchell Ayres)
6. "The First Noël" (Traditional Christmas music)
7. "O Come All Ye Faithful" (Latin hymn translated by Frederick Oakeley)
8. "We Three Kings of Orient Are" (Adapted by Mitchell Ayres and Jack Andrews)
9. "Silent Night" (Words and music by Joseph Mohr and Franz Gruber)

== Charts ==
| Year | Peak chart position |
| Year | US Albums |
|---|---|
| 1960 | 22 |
| 1961 | 27 |
| 1962 | 33 |
| 1962 | 74 |
| 2021 | 110 |
