= Seasons Greetings from Less Than Jake =

EP by Less Than Jake
- Released: February 16, 2012
- Recorded: 2011–2012
- Genre: Ska punk; punk rock; pop punk
- Length: 15:20
- Language: English
- Label: Sleep It Off
- Producer: Roger Lima

Less Than Jake chronology
Greetings from Less Than Jake (2011)	Seasons Greetings from Less Than Jake (2012)	Greetings & Salutations from Less Than Jake (2012)

Seasons Greetings from Less Than Jake is an EP by American ska-punk band Less Than Jake, released on February 16, 2012 on their own label, Sleep It Off Records. Released in conjunction with the band's twentieth anniversary, the EP is a follow-up to the band's previous release, Greetings from Less Than Jake (2011). In October 2012, the two EPs were combined to create the full-length album, Greetings and Salutations (2012).

Despite the EP's artwork and title, the band has stated that it is not a festive-themed release, noting, "This is no Christmas record. This is five brand new songs, written and recorded in the winter of late 2011 and very early 2012. This is a companion to our summer EP, Greetings From Less Than Jake. Consider both groups of songs; the salt to the pepper, the peanut butter to the jelly, you get it right?"

== Track listing ==
1. "The New Auld Lang Syne" – 3:34
2. "Younger Lungs" – 3:11
3. "A Return to Headphones" – 2:48
4. "Done and Dusted" – 3:12
5. "Finer Points of Forgiveness" – 2:35

== Personnel ==
=== Less Than Jake ===
- Chris DeMakes – vocals, guitar
- Roger Lima – vocals, bass guitar
- Peter "JR" Wasilewski – saxophone
- Buddy Schaub – trombone
- Vinnie Fiorello – drums

=== Recording personnel ===
- Roger Lima – producer, recording
- Stephen Egerton – mixing, mastering

=== Artwork ===
- JP Flexner
