= Tequesta, Florida =

- Village
- Village of Tequesta
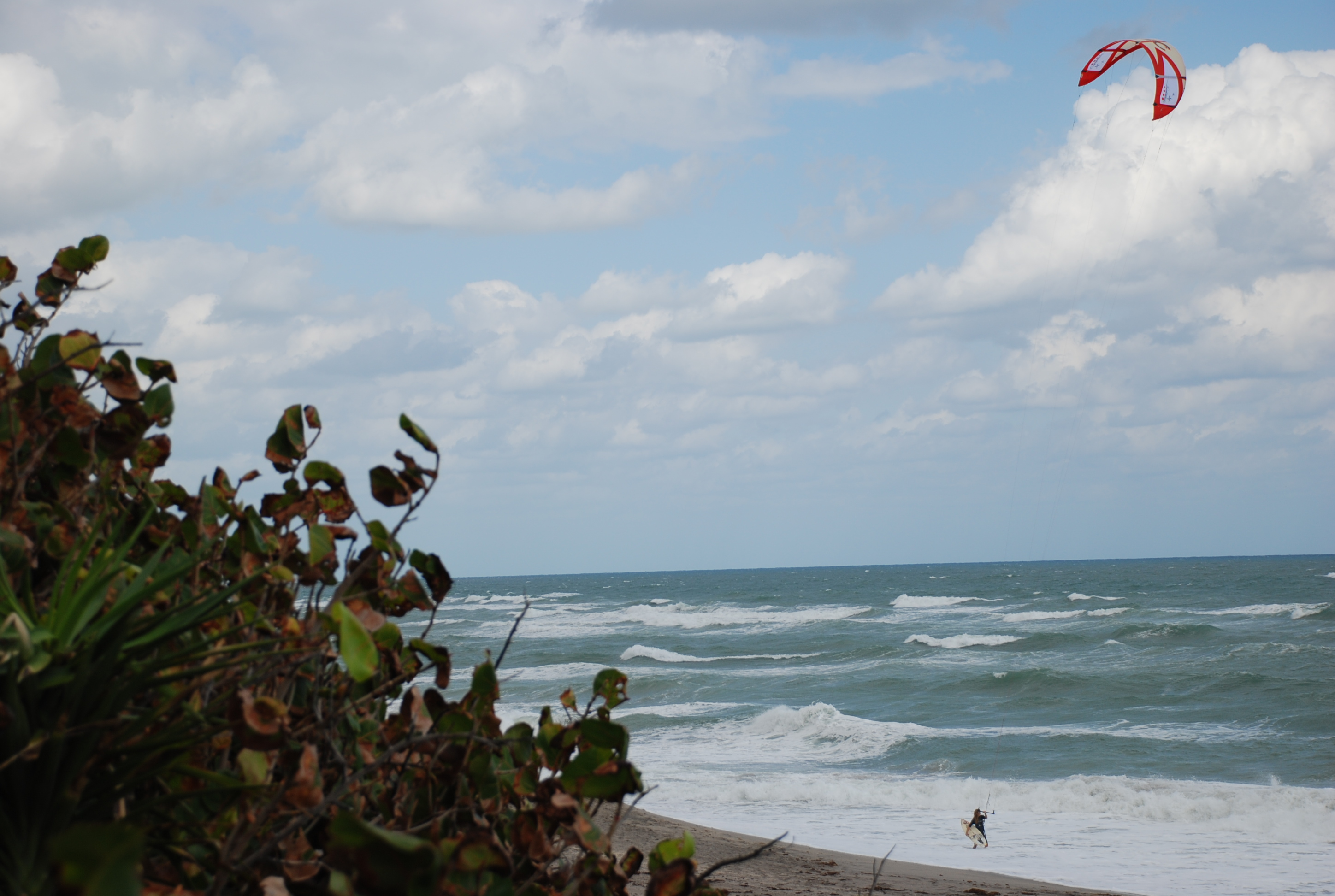
- Beach scene

- Seal

- Location of Tequesta in Palm Beach County, Florida
- Coordinates: 26°57′58″N 80°07′12″W
- Country: United States
- State: Florida
- County: Palm Beach
- Incorporated: 1957

Area
  - Total: 2.25 sq mi (5.84 km^{2})
  - Land: 1.83 sq mi (4.74 km^{2})
  - Water: 0.42 sq mi (1.10 km^{2})
- Elevation: 7 ft (2.1 m)

Population (2020)
  - Total: 6,158
  - Density: 3,361.9/sq mi (1,298.05/km^{2})
- Time zone: UTC-5 (Eastern (EST))
  - Summer (DST): UTC-4 (EDT)
- ZIP code: 33469
- Area codes: 561, 728
- FIPS code: 12-71525
- GNIS feature ID: 2407560
- Website: www.tequesta.org

Tequesta is an incorporated village in Palm Beach County, Florida, United States. It is the northernmost municipality in the Miami metropolitan area, and, according to the 2020 United States census, had a total population of 6,158 South Florida residents.

== History ==
Tequesta was founded in the 1950s as a planned community centered on the Tequesta Country Club. Tequesta was named after the Tequesta people that originally inhabited the area. The village was incorporated in 1957.

== Geography ==
According to the United States Census Bureau, the village has a total area of 2.2 square miles (5.7 km^{2}), of which 1.8 square miles (4.7 km^{2}) is land and 0.5 square miles (1.3 km^{2}), or 20.81%, is water.

Most of the village is located on the mainland but parts of the village are on Jupiter Island in Martin County, with small sections both north and south of the unincorporated, county-owned Coral Cove Park.

Going to and from Tequesta from the south or east requires going over a bridge. Starting March 13, 2023, the Jupiter Federal Bridge will be closed for roughly 20 months to construct two 11-foot (3.4 m) travel lanes, 7-foot (2.1 m) bicycle lanes and 8-foot (2.4 m) sidewalks in each direction. The new bridge will have up to 42 feet (13 m) of vertical clearance, and the navigable-channel width will be increased to 125 feet (38 m) also.

== Demographics ==
Historical population
Census	Pop.	Note	%±
1960	199		—
1970	2,642		1,227.6%
1980	3,685		39.5%
1990	4,499		22.1%
2000	5,273		17.2%
2010	5,629		6.8%
2020	6,158		9.4%
U.S. Decennial Census

=== 2020 census ===
As of the 2020 census, Tequesta had a population of 6,158. The median age was 51.4 years. 17.3% of residents were under the age of 18 and 29.1% of residents were 65 years of age or older. For every 100 females there were 92.1 males, and for every 100 females age 18 and over there were 89.5 males age 18 and over.

100.0% of residents lived in urban areas, while 0.0% lived in rural areas.

There were 2,675 households in Tequesta, of which 23.6% had children under the age of 18 living in them. Of all households, 52.4% were married-couple households, 16.1% were households with a male householder and no spouse or partner present, and 25.9% were households with a female householder and no spouse or partner present. About 30.3% of all households were made up of individuals and 16.6% had someone living alone who was 65 years of age or older.

There were 3,225 housing units, of which 17.1% were vacant. The homeowner vacancy rate was 1.2% and the rental vacancy rate was 13.0%.

Tequesta racial composition (Hispanics excluded from racial categories) (NH = Non-Hispanic)
Race	Number	Percentage
White (NH)	5,326	86.49%
Black or African American (NH)	43	0.70%
Native American or Alaska Native (NH)	7	0.11%
Asian (NH)	72	1.17%
Pacific Islander or Native Hawaiian (NH)	1	0.02%
Some other race (NH)	15	0.24%
Two or more races/Multiracial (NH)	194	3.15%
Hispanic or Latino (any race)	500	8.12%
Total	6,158	100.00%

=== Demographic estimates ===
A 2020 ACS estimate reported 1,803 families residing in the village.

=== 2010 census ===
Tequesta Demographics
2010 Census	Tequesta	Palm Beach County	Florida
Total population	5,629	1,320,134	18,801,310
Population, percent change, 2000 to 2010	+6.8%	+16.7%	+17.6%
Population density	3,092.9/sq mi	670.2/sq mi	350.6/sq mi
White or Caucasian (including White Hispanic)	95.8%	73.5%	75.0%
(Non-Hispanic White or Caucasian)	91.1%	60.1%	57.9%
Black or African-American	0.5%	17.3%	16.0%
Hispanic or Latino (of any race)	6.1%	19.0%	22.5%
Asian	1.3%	2.4%	2.4%
Native American or Native Alaskan	0.1%	0.5%	0.4%
Pacific Islander or Native Hawaiian	0.0%	0.1%	0.1%
Two or more races (Multiracial)	0.7%	2.3%	2.5%
Some Other Race	0.2%	3.9%	3.6%

As of the 2010 United States census, there were 5,629 people, 2,490 households, and 1,567 families residing in the village.

=== 2000 census ===
As of the 2000 census, there were 5,273 people, 2,344 households, and 1,521 families residing in the village. The population density was 3,013.9 inhabitants per square mile (1,163.7/km^{2}). There were 2,834 housing units at an average density of 1,619.8 per square mile (625.4/km^{2}). The racial makeup of the village was 97.97% White (95.8% were Non-Hispanic White), 0.47% African American, 0.09% Native American, 0.70% Asian, 0.02% Pacific Islander, 0.13% from other races, and 0.61% from two or more races. Hispanic or Latino of any race were 2.43% of the population.

In 2000, there were 2,344 households out of which 22.8% had children under the age of 18 living with them, 55.7% were married couples living together, 7.0% had a female householder with no husband present, and 35.1% were non-families. 29.5% of all households were made up of individuals and 17.8% had someone living alone who was 65 years of age or older. The average household size was 2.22 and the average family size was 2.75.

In 2000, the village the population was spread out with 19.1% under the age of 18, 4.0% from 18 to 24, 22.9% from 25 to 44, 27.1% from 45 to 64, and 26.9% who were 65 years of age or older. The median age was 48 years. For every 100 females there were 89.3 males. For every 100 females age 18 and over, there were 83.3 males.

As of 2000, the median income for a household in the village was $58,825, and the median income for a family was $72,683. Males had a median income of $51,563 versus $31,855 for females. The per capita income for the village was $34,974. About 1.6% of families and 3.2% of the population were below the poverty line, including none of those under age 18 and 6.8% of those age 65 or over.

As of 2000, English spoken as a first language made up 95.24% of all residents, while Spanish as a mother tongue accounted for 4.76% of the population.

== Notable people ==
- Ryan Berube, 1996 Olympic swimming gold medalist, 4 × 200 m freestyle
- Fletcher C. Booker Jr., US Army major general
- Mark Calcavecchia, PGA Tour golfer
- Keith Hernandez, Major League Baseball player, 1979 National League co-MVP
- Steve Marino, PGA Tour golfer
- Joe Namath, Pro Football Hall of Fame quarterback
- Jo Ann Pflug, film and TV actress
- Burt Reynolds, actor
- Tom Rooney, Representative from Florida's 17th congressional district
- Scott Sharp, auto racer
- Bob Shaw, Major League Baseball player

== Churches ==
- Family Church Tequesta
- Mary, Mother of the Light Maronite Catholic Church
- St Jude Catholic Church
- First Presbyterian Church of Tequesta-Jupiter
- The Church of the Good Shepherd
- Jupiter-Tequesta Church of Christ, Martin County

== Education ==
The Village of Tequesta has one private Christian elementary school: Good Shepherd Episcopal School (PreK–6); and two Christian preschools: Christ the King Lutheran Preschool, and First Presbyterian Preschool. Residents living in the Village of Tequesta who wish to attend public school in Palm Beach County are zoned for schools in the town of Jupiter, including Limestone Creek Elementary, Jupiter Elementary, Jupiter Middle School, and Jupiter Community High School. Those who live in Martin County are zoned for Hobe Sound Elementary, Murray Middle School, and South Fork High School.

== Emergency services ==
=== Fire Rescue ===
The Tequesta Fire Rescue department provides fire protection and emergency medical services to the citizens of the village. They operate from Station 85, located in the village's Public Safety Facility (Engine 85, Engine 285, Truck 85, Rescue 85, Rescue 285).

=== Law enforcement ===
The Tequesta Police Department consists of approximately 20 sworn officers, and is headquartered in the village's Public Safety Facility.

== Media ==
Tequesta is the city of license for West Palm Beach's ABC affiliate, WPBF. While WPBF and the rest of West Palm Beach's television stations serve Tequesta, WPBF has no physical presence in the village.

== Gallery ==
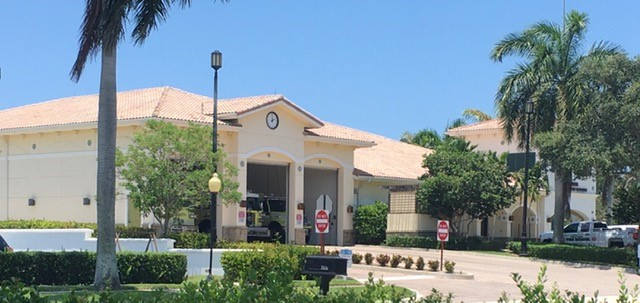
Tequesta Fire Rescue Station

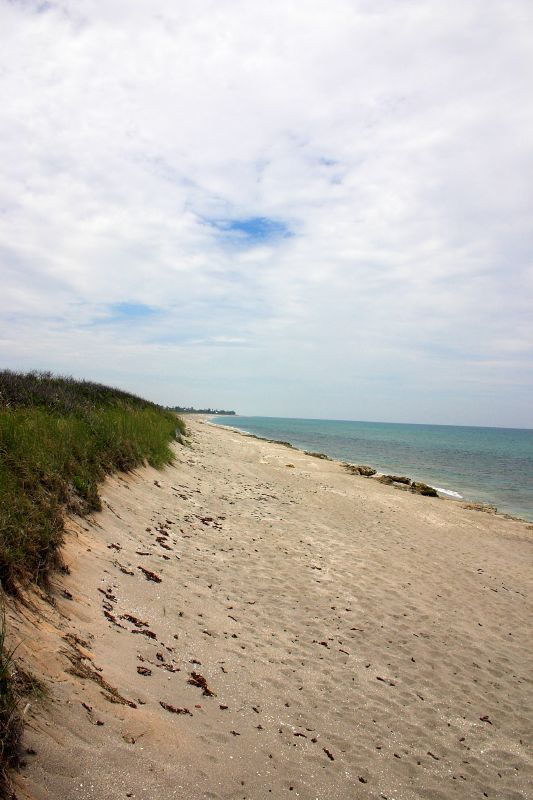
Blowing Rocks Preserve

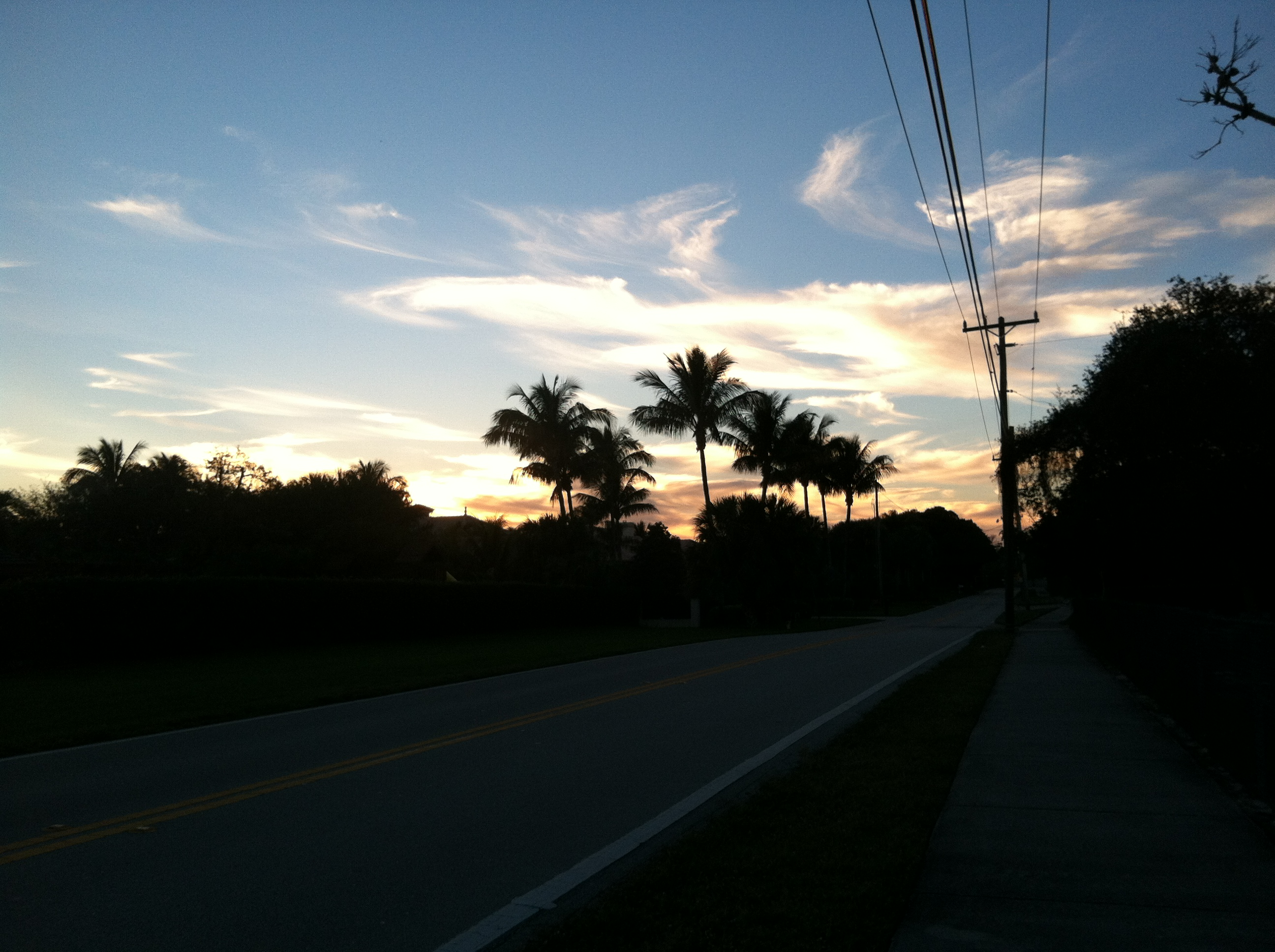
Road at sunset in Tequesta, 2012
