= Mitchell Ayres =

American songwriter (1909–1969)

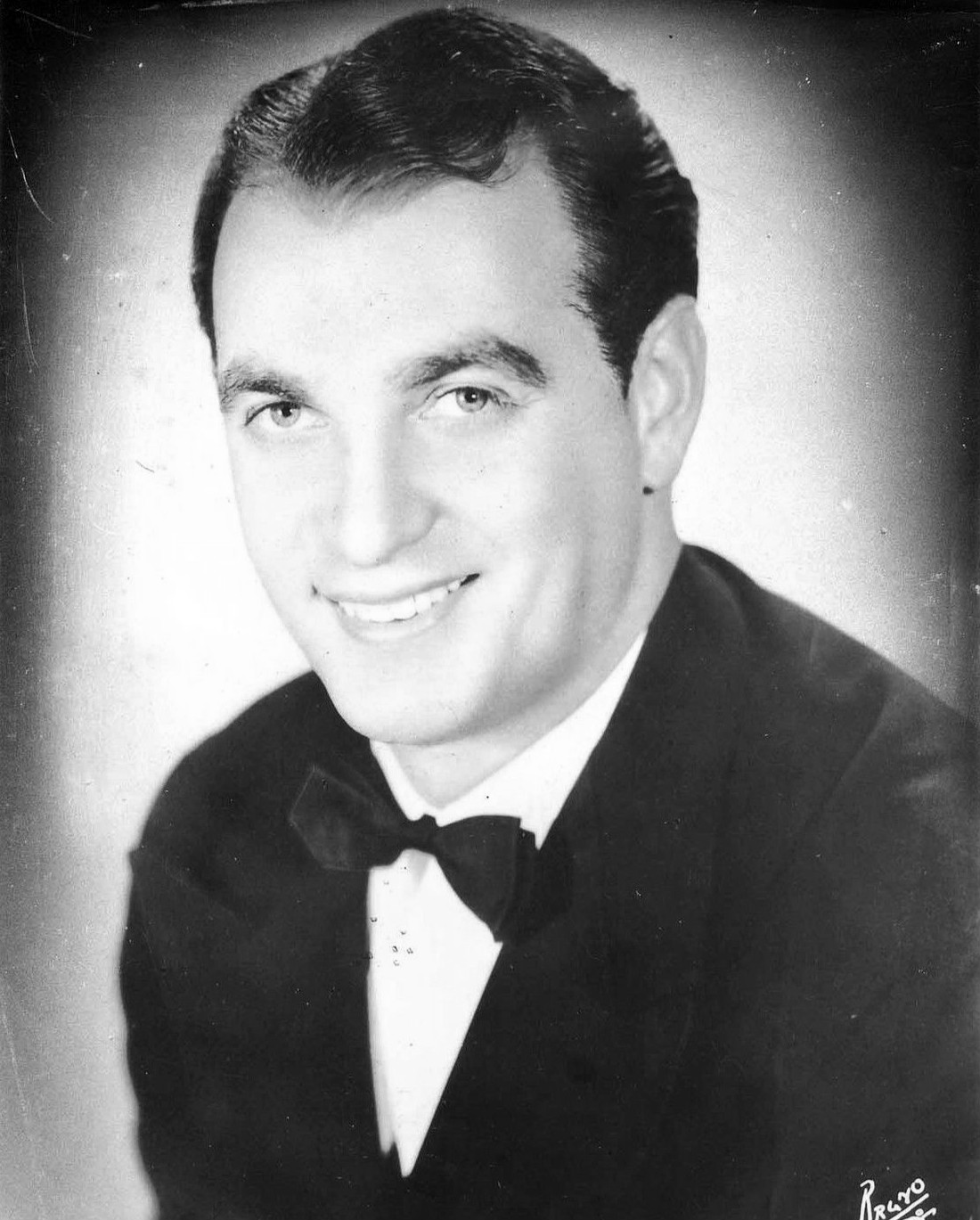
- Mitchell Ayres

Background information
- Born: Mitchell Agress; December 24, 1909; Milwaukee, Wisconsin
- Died: September 5, 1969 (aged 59) Winchester, Nevada
- Genres: pop, Easy listening
- Occupations: conductor arranger composer performer
- Instrument: Violin
- Years active: 1930s–1969

Mitchell Ayres (December 24, 1909 – September 5, 1969) was an orchestra leader, music arranger, composer and performer. He is best known for his many years of work with Perry Como on radio, records, and television and as the musical conductor for The Hollywood Palace.

== Early years ==
Born Mitchell Agress in Milwaukee, Wisconsin, he attended Columbia University, majoring in physical education, but began performing professionally at the Brooklyn Academy of Music while still a Columbia student. After graduation, Ayres became a violinist with the Roxy Theater Orchestra; he later moved on to the same position with the St. Louis Symphony Orchestra. Because he wanted to return to New York, Ayres left classical music for popular, accepting a job with Jimmy Carr's Orchestra. Ayres later worked with Abe Lyman and Jack Little, known as Little Jack Little.

== Fashions in Music ==
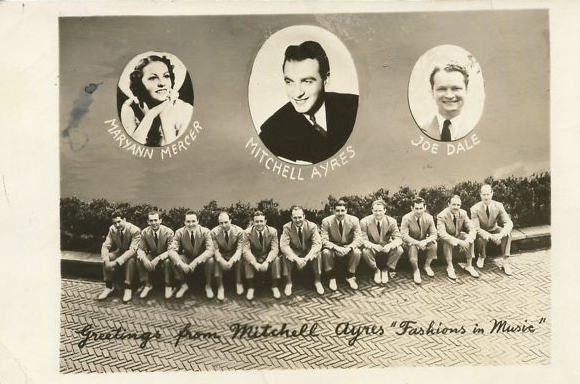
Promotional postcard for Fashions in Music.

In 1937, after working in Little's band for a few years, Ayres and some of the other musicians decided to break away and start their own band. The musicians were extremely business-minded when planning their venture. The band was treated like a company, where each member had an equal number of stock shares in the new band. The orchestra leader was decided by election, and it was Ayres who was voted the head of the orchestra. Calling themselves "Fashions in Music" and selecting the song "You Go to My Head" as their theme, the members worked on arrangements and developing their own style while waiting for their first engagement. It took some time, but the orchestra got its first job at Brooklyn's Hotel St. George. The original contract with the hotel called for the band to play there for four weeks; their stay turned out to be seven months long.

Fashions in Music was then signed to their first recording contract for "Row, Row, Row", which sold 50,000 copies soon after its release. Radio stations began playing the record, and the orchestra was in demand for appearances throughout the country. In 1939, Bluebird Records offered the band an initial one-year contract; the arrangement lasted until 1942. All the while, the orchestra continued to function as a company, with the musician shareholders discussing business matters and voting on them. By 1940, the orchestra had its own show on CBS Radio. Ayres and the band appeared in three 1940s films: Swingtime Johnny, Moonlight and Cactus, and Lady, Let's Dance.

Ayres and his orchestra reached the national top 5 with their version of "Make Believe Island" (1940), vocal by Mary Ann Mercer.

== Studio work and Como ==
During World War II, Ayres began conducting for vocal groups such as The Andrews Sisters. He also began working for Columbia Records as a musical director, working with Benny Goodman, Frank Sinatra, Pearl Bailey, and others signed to the record label, including Doris Day and Dinah Shore.

Mitchell Ayres' first association with Perry Como came in 1944 when he was asked to conduct for a demo recording of a radio program with Como as its host. The program became The Chesterfield Supper Club. Ayres and Como shared an enthusiasm for golf and often played together. In 1948, Como offered Ayres the job as the conductor of his "Supper Club" broadcasts while the two were playing golf. Ayres and his orchestra also began recording with Como for RCA Victor; Como's pronunciation and phrasing on the recordings of "Kol Nidrei" and "Eli, Eli" were learned from a member of Ayres' orchestra, who was the son of a rabbi. When The Chesterfield Supper Club moved to television in late 1948, Ayres and his orchestra were part of the cast. Ayres and his orchestra remained with Como on his CBS television show, moving to NBC for both The Perry Como Show and Perry Como's Kraft Music Hall. While both Ayres and Como were working at CBS, Ayres and his orchestra also worked on the TV's Top Tunes program, which was a summer replacement for Como's television show. They were regulars on Como's programs until 1964.

In 1963, after almost 20 years of a regularly scheduled radio or television show, Perry Como was not certain if he would continue making regular television appearances. His uncertainty caused Ayres to accept an offer to become the conductor for a new television show, The Hollywood Palace, which premiered in January 1964. He was nominated for an Emmy award for his musical work on the show in 1966 and again in 1968. At the time of his death, Ayres was working for the television program.

== Death ==
Ayres was struck and killed by a car while crossing a street in Winchester, Nevada on September 5, 1969. He was in the Las Vegas area working as the musical conductor for Connie Francis' show at the newly opened Landmark Hotel. He was survived by his wife, Georgianna, a son, Lawrence, and a daughter, Judith. One week after her husband's death, Georgianna Ayres died of a heart attack. Ayres and his wife are buried at Forest Lawn Memorial Park, Glendale.

== Compositions ==
Among the songs composed by Ayres are "Scratchin' the Surface", "He's a Wolf", "I'm a Slave to You" and "Madeira".
