= The Fureys discography =

Listing for Irish male folk band

- Singles: 16
- Bootleg albums: 1

The Fureys are an Irish male folk band from Ireland.

The Fureys has the albums When You Were Sweet Sixteen (1982) AUS #18, Steal Away (1983) AUS #45 and The First Leaves of Autumn (1986) AUS #85 all chart in Australia.

== Studio albums ==
Year	Album details	Peak chart positions	
Year	Album details	IRL	UK
2004	25 Years Anniversary Collection: Label: Dolphin Records; Formats: CD, Cassette	69	-
2008	30 Years: Label: Formats: CD	63	-
2008	Alcoholidays: Label: Formats: CD	24	-
2012	The Fureys Finest: Label: Formats: CD	10	-

== Singles ==
Year	Single Details	Peak chart positions	
Year	Single Details	IRL	UK
1979	Green Fields Of France: Label: Banshee; Formats: Vinyl	1	-
1979	Shipyard Slip: Label: Polydor; Formats: Vinyl	26	-
1979	Leaving Nancy: Label: Banshee; Formats: Vinyl	6	-
1980	Lonesome Boatman: Label: Banshee; Formats: Vinyl	12	-
1981	Beer Beer Beer: Label: Formats: Vinyl	18	-
1981	When You Were Sweet Sixteen: Label: Formats: Vinyl	1	14
1982	I Will Love You: Label: Formats: Vinyl	18	54
1982	The Old Man: Label: Banshee; Formats: Vinyl	9	-
1983	Now Is The Hour: Label: Banshee; Formats: Vinyl	8	-
1983	Steal Away: Label: Banshee; Formats: Vinyl	24	-
1983	Silver Threads Amongst The Gold: Label: Banshee; Formats: Vinyl	23	-
1985	Dreaming My Dreams: Label: Banshee; Formats: Vinyl	13	-
1986	What You Meant To Me: Label: Banshee; Formats: Vinyl	28	-
1987	Red Rose: Label: Banshee; Formats: Vinyl	10	-
1988	Dublin Take Me: Label: Formats: Vinyl	25	-
1991	I Will Love You: Label: Formats: Vinyl	10	-
