= Clarice Vance =

American vaudeville actress (1870–1961)

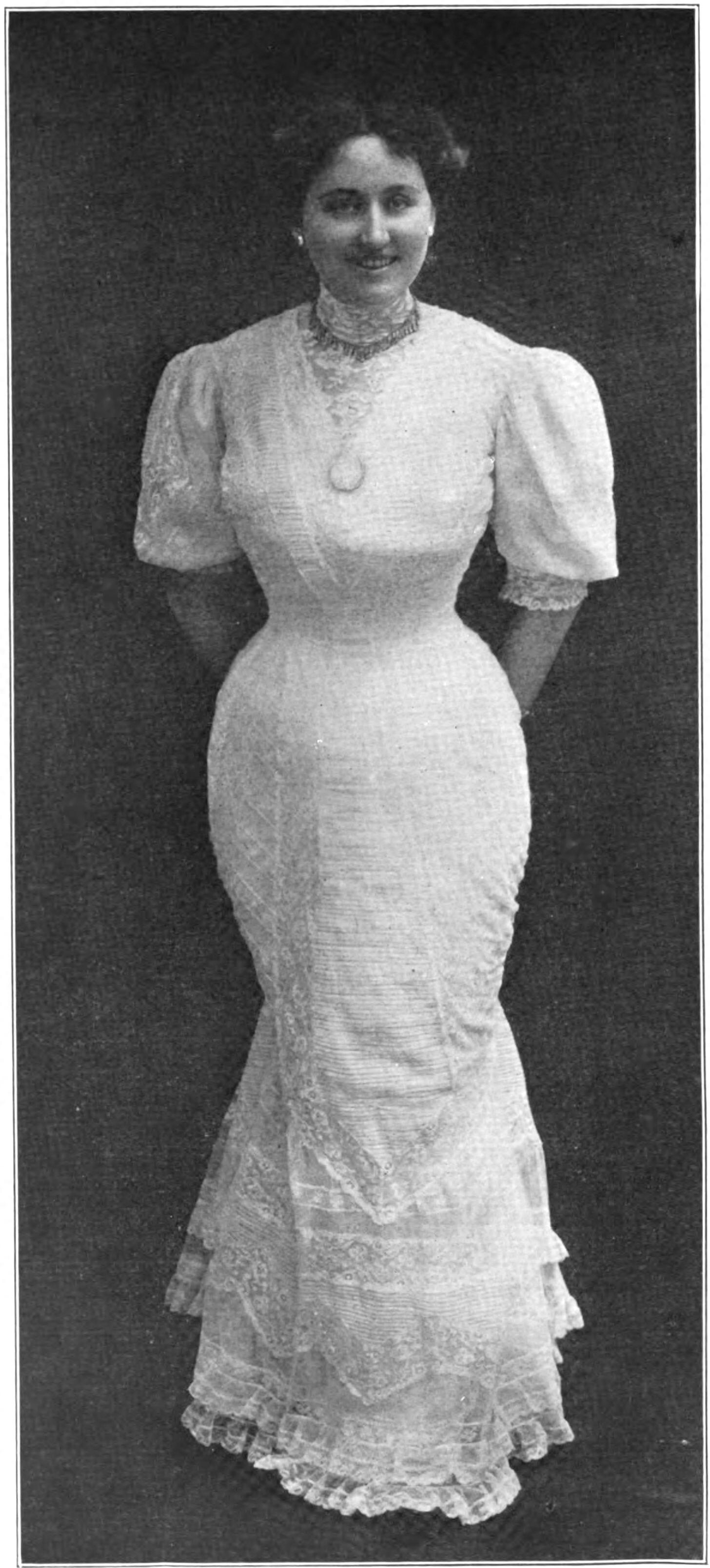
Clarice Vance 1908

Clarice Vance née Clara Etta Black (March 14, 1870 – August 24, 1961), "The Southern Singer" was an American vaudeville personality from the late 19th century to about 1917.

== Early life and marriage ==
Clarice Vance was born in Ohio in 1870. She began her career in farce comedy in the early 1890s and was such a hit singing the songs interpolated into plot that she quickly won fame, singing ragtime and dialect songs as a single. When she performed with the James and Bonnie Thornton troop, he coined her, "The Southern Singer".

She married "Mose" Gumble, head of Remick Music Publishing in New York, in 1904, but divorced him in 1914. Gumble was a well known songwriter along with his brother, Albert, but is remembered today as the man who gave George Gershwin his first job plugging songs at Remick. According to the 1900 census, this well known marriage was preceded by a marriage to William A. Sims who served briefly as her manager. According to the New York Clipper she was granted a divorce from John Blanchard in early 1904. This was followed by her marriage to Gumble.

Recent research into Pike County, Ohio census records indicate that Clarice's mother's name was Mary Vance, solving the riddle of her stage name. Her middle name was actually "Etta" not Ella. This was confirmed by Sterling Morris after obtaining a copy of the original notice in Variety of her marriage to Gumble in 1904. The New York Times' archives reveal that Vance later married Phelps Decker, a screen scenario writer and for a short time, manager in the New York offices of Universal Pictures. His services were terminated in early 1928 and discovered by his wife, "former vaudeville actress Clarice Vance" to have asphyxiated himself on February 5, 1928, in their apartment at 35 East 15th St. Manhattan, New York. He was 16 years her junior.

== Career ==
Vance was known as a "coon singer", singing popular Negro dialect songs of the day. She was a handsome woman, slightly over 6' tall and could project over a 26-piece orchestra when she sang on the stage. She shared the bill with the leading headliners of the day and her impish face appears on dozens of sheet music covers from 1897 to 1914. Her picture appeared in Vanity Fair at one point. In 1910 she starred in a short-lived but lavish Broadway musical, A Skylark. She played at least three extended engagements in London, the most successful being a 26-week appearance at the London Palace in 1909.

Her records exhibit a rare, radiant and very droll wit. She recorded for Edison Records in 1905 (two selections) and from 1906 to 1909 for Victor. Her most popular song was "Mariar", co-written by her husband; she recorded three versions of it.

== Later life ==
Vance's life after 1923 is shrouded in mystery. In the early 1920s, she appeared briefly in movies in character parts and slid into total oblivion, but according to the 1935 California voters registration, she was living in San Francisco, listing her profession as "dramatic coach" and residing at 1045 Bush Street.

From 1944 to 1951, she lived in a rooming house at 1535 Pine Street in San Francisco. From 1951 until her death in 1961, she was a patient at Napa State Mental Hospital in Napa, California. She died at this facility, aged 91, knowing only her name and that she was "an actress".
