= Arabian riff =

Widely used melody

Song
- Published: 1845
- Genre: Folk music

The basic melody

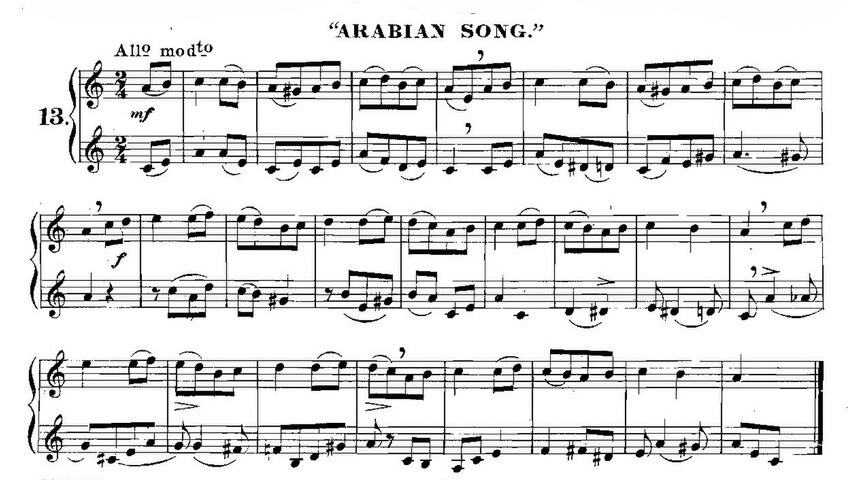
The melody titled "Arabian Song" in Arban’s Complete Conservatory Method for Trumpet, first published in 1864

The "Arabian riff", also known as "The Streets of Cairo", "The Poor Little Country Maid", and "the snake charmer song", is a well-known melody, published in different forms in the 19th century. Alternate titles for children's songs using this melody include "The Girls in France" and "The Southern Part of France".

== History ==
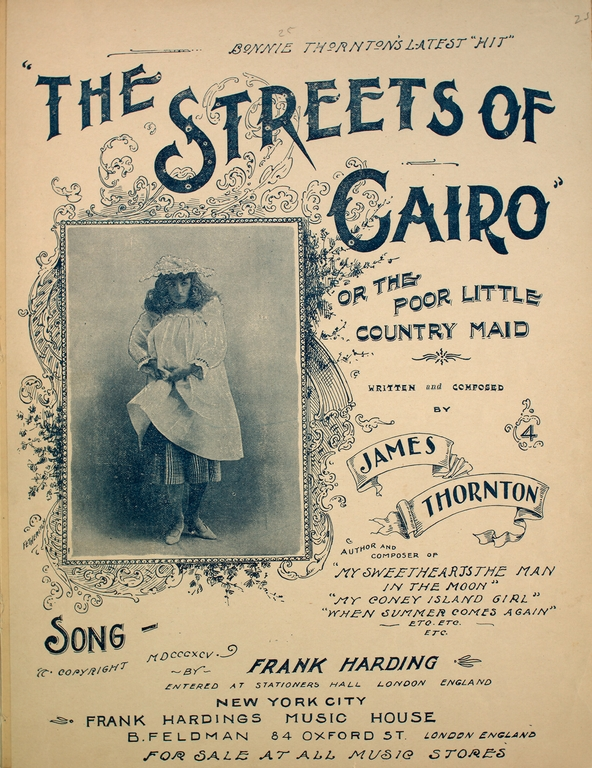
1895 sheet music cover for "The Streets of Cairo"

"Melodia arabe"
Hünten version (1845)

"Arabian song"
Arban version (1864)

"The Streets of Cairo, or the Poor Little Country Maid"
Thornton version (1895)

There is a clear resemblance between the riff and the French song Colin prend sa hotte (published by Christophe Ballard in 1719), whose first five notes are identical. Colin prend sa hotte appears to be derived from the lost Kradoudja, an Algerian folk song of the 17th century.

A version of the riff was published in 1845 by Franz Hünten as Melodie Arabe. The melody was described as an "Arabian Song" in the La grande méthode complète de cornet à piston et de saxhorn par Arban, first published in 1864.

Sol Bloom, a showman (and later a U.S. congressman), published the song as the entertainment director of the World's Columbian Exposition in 1893. It included an attraction called "A Street in Cairo" produced by Gaston Akoun, which featured snake charmers, camel rides and a scandalous dancer known as Little Egypt. Songwriter James Thornton penned the words and music to his own version of this melody, "Streets Of Cairo or The Poor Little Country Maid". Copyrighted in 1895, it was made popular by his wife Lizzie Cox, who used the stage name Bonnie Thornton. The oldest known recording of the song is from 1895, performed by Dan Quinn (Berliner Discs 171-Z).

== In popular culture ==
=== Music ===
It has been used as a basis for numerous songs, including "Kutchy Kutchy".

==== 20th century ====
- "Scherzo for String Quartet" by Charles Ives (1904)
- Modified version of "The Streets of Cairo, or the Poor Little Country Maid" was featured in the Mickey Mouse short, The Karnival Kid (1929)
- "Open Sesame" by Kool & the Gang (1976)
- "King Tut" by Steve Martin and the Toot Uncommons (1978)
- "Istanbul (Not Constantinople)" by They Might Be Giants (1990)

==== 21st century ====
- "Take It Off" by Kesha (2010)
- "Serving" by Miriana Conte (2025)
- "Timanttei" by Mirella (2025)

== Children's culture and parodies ==
The tune is used for a 20th-century American children's song with – like many unpublished songs of child folk culture – countless variations as the song is passed from child to child over considerable lengths of time and geography, the one constant being that the versions are almost always lewd or inappropriate. One variation, for example, is:

There's a place in France
Where the ladies wear no pants
But the men don't care
'cause they don't wear underwear.

or a similar version:

There's a place in France
Where the naked ladies dance
There's a hole in the wall
Where the men can see it all.

== See also ==
- Oriental riff – similar musical motif, often associated with China
- Italian riff
