= Finbar Furey =

Irish musician

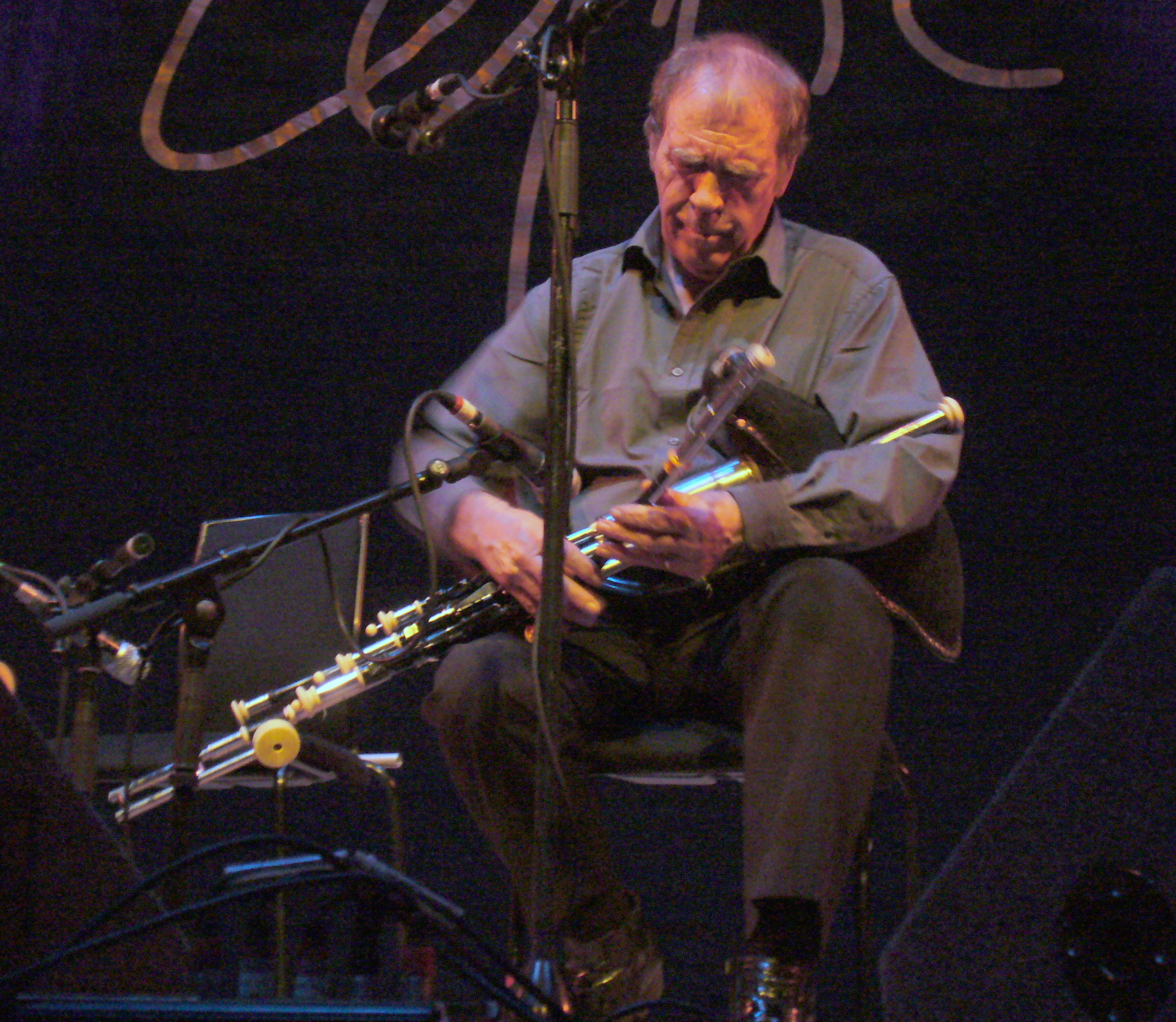

Background information
- Born: Finbar Feargal Furey; 28 September 1946 (age 79); Dublin, Ireland
- Origin: Ballyfermot, Dublin, Ireland
- Genres: Folk music, Irish music, Irish folk
- Occupation: Musician
- Instruments: Uilleann pipes, banjo, acoustic guitar and tin whistle
- Years active: 1960s–present
- Labels: Valley Entertainment, Dolphin Music
- Website: www.finbarfurey.com, www.facebook.com/finbarfurey

Finbar Feargal Furey (born 28 September 1946) is a multi-instrumental Irish folk musician. He is best known for the band he formed with his brothers, The Fureys. The Fureys were formed in Ballyfermot, Dublin, where they grew up.

== Early life ==
Finbar Feargal Furey was born on 28 September 1946 in Ballyfermot, Dublin. Finbar's well-known musician father, Ted, started him on the Uilleann pipes while he was very young. By his teens, he had won three All Ireland Medals, The Oireachtas, and many Feisanna. He was the only piper to win the All Ireland, the Oireachtas medal and the four province titles in the same year. Finbar is an Irish Traveller.

== Career ==
Finbar popularised the pipes worldwide while on tour with his brother Eddie in the 1960s. In 1969, Finbar and Eddie began touring as backup musicians for the influential Irish folk group The Clancy Brothers. Finbar played the pipes, as well as the banjo, tin whistle, and guitar with the group live, on television, and on recordings. The Furey brothers left the group the following year and began performing as a duo again. Finbar and Eddie were awarded Single of the Year by John Peel in 1972.

When the younger brothers Paul and George joined the band, several years later, The Fureys enjoyed hits including When You Were Sweet Sixteen, Tara Hill, Green Fields of France, Red Rose Café, and The Lonesome Boatman. In Britain, they became one of the first Irish folk groups to play on Top of the Pops.

In 1997, after nearly thirty years as The Fureys' front man, Finbar decided the time was right to follow his own path as a singer songwriter. He decided to step aside and pursue his solo career, to present his definitive one-man show, and to explore new pastures as a singer, producer, and writer.

In the early 2000s, Finbar began an acting career. His first appearance was in the Martin Scorsese film Gangs of New York. He has also appeared in 2004's Adam & Paul, 2007's Strength and Honour, 2010s short Paris Sexy, and the RTÉ Television series Love/Hate.

In 2011 he released the album Colours on Dolphin Music. The album, which featured guest performances from Mary Black and Shayne Ward, was released in North America in 2012 on the Valley Entertainment record label.

In August 2013, Furey appeared on the Irish television show The Hit. He recorded a single pitched by a songwriter, Gerry Fleming, "The Last Great Love Song", which charted at number one in the Irish charts, against Mundy's song "Jigsaw Man" written by Mark Walsh, which charted at number five. The song was performed again with the RTÉ Concert Orchestra in the final and came first place in the public vote, earning the title "The Ultimate Hit".

In 2023, he released the album "Moments in Time" including a collection of his own compositions along with traditional songs.
