= When You Were Sweet Sixteen (album) =

1982 album by The Fureys and Davey Arthur

Studio album by The Fureys and Davey Arthur
- Released: 1982
- Studio: Lombard Studios Dublin
- Label: Banshee Records BAN 1002
- Producer: Finbar Furey (partial)

The Fureys and Davey Arthur chronology
The Green Fields of France (1981)	When You Were Sweet Sixteen (1982)	Steal Away (1983)

When You Were Sweet Sixteen is a 1982 album by The Fureys and Davey Arthur. It contains the group's hit by the same name as well as another charting single by the ensemble.

== Background ==
The album was recorded at Lombard Studios Dublin. Finbar Furey produced the tracks "When You Were Sweet Sixteen" and " Seige of a Nation". It was released in the UK in 1982 on Banshee Records BAN 1002 It was released in Canada the following year on Avalon AVE 1013.

== Reception ==
The album was given 3/5 stars by AllMusic.

== Charts ==
The album peaked at No. 99 on the UK chart during its one week run. It also peaked at No. 18 on the Australian album chart.

== Singles ==
The single "When You Were Sweet Sixteen" peaked at No. 14 in the UK. The next single, "I Will Love You (Everytime When We Are Gone)" peaked at No. 54 in the UK.

== Later years ==
The album was re-released in Europe on Castle Classics CLACD 171 in 1989.

== Track listing ==
A

1. "I Will Love You Ev'ry Time" - 4:21
2. "Yesterday's People" - 2:45
3. "Gallipoli" - 4:12
4. "Song For Ireland" - 4:20
5. "The Old Man" - 3:45
6. "Oh! Babushka" - 3:30

B

1. "When You Were Sweet Sixteen" - 4:26
2. "Anniversary Song" - 4:00
3. "Belfast Mill (Oregon Mill)" - 3:15
4. "Seige of a Nation" - 4:15
5. "Yesterday's Men" - 4:00
6. "My Love Is Like a Red Red Rose" - 4:04

== Musicians ==
- Eddie Furey: vocals, guitar, mandola, bohran
- Finbar Furey: lead vocals, uilleann pipes, banjo, guitar, whistles, flute
- Paul Furey: accordion, melodion, whistles, spoons, backing vocals
- George Furey: vocals, guitar, accordion
- Davey Arthur: guitar, banjo, mandolin, backing vocals

== Releases ==
Singles
Act	Release	Catalogue	Year	Format	Notes
The Fureys and Davey Arthur	When You Were Sweet Sixteen	Banshee Records BAN 1002	1982	LP	UK
The Fureys	When You Were Sweet Sixteen	Ritz Records RITZ L.P.0004	1982	LP	UK
The Fureys	When You Were Sweet Sixteen	Epic ELPS 4318	1982	LP	New Zealand
The Fureys & Davey Arthur	When You Were Sweet Sixteen	David Gresham Records NGC 1043	1982	LP	South Africa
The Fureys and David Arthur	When You Were Sweet Sixteen	Avalon Records AVE 1013	1983	LP	Canada
The Fureys and Davey Arthur	When You Were Sweet Sixteen	R-Tek RSPC-112	1986	Cassette	Canada
The Fureys & Davey Arthur	When You Were Sweet Sixteen	Castle Classics CLALP 171	1989	LP	UK
