= James Thornton (songwriter) =

Irish-American songwriter and vaudeville performer (1861–1938)

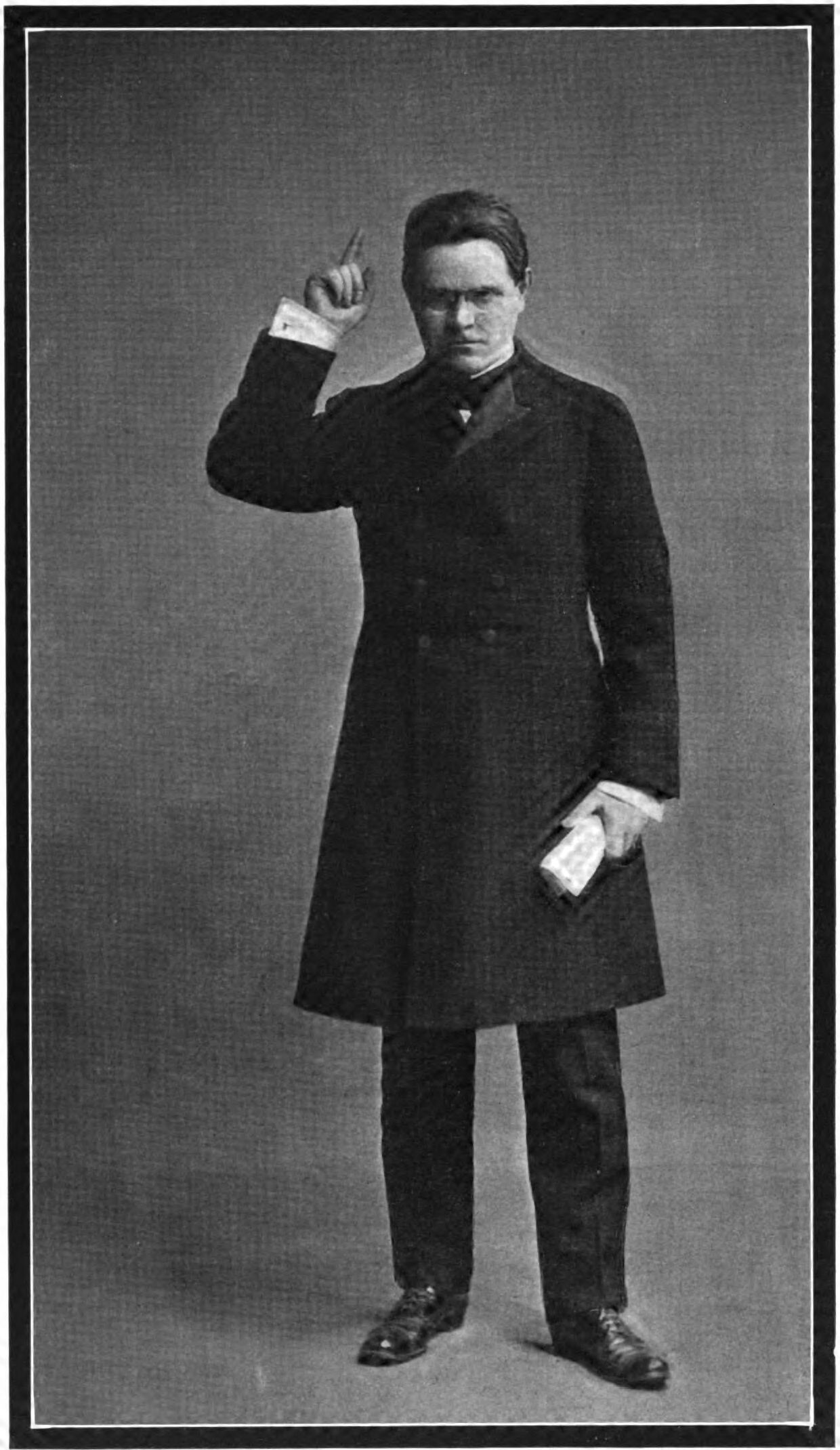

Background information
- Born: December 5, 1861; Dublin or Liverpool, United Kingdom
- Died: July 27, 1938 (aged 76) New York City, New York, United States
- Genres: Popular music
- Occupations: Songwriter/singer, comedian
- Years active: c. 1885–1934

James Thornton (December 5, 1861 – July 27, 1938) was an Irish-American songwriter and vaudeville performer. He is primarily remembered today as the composer of the 1898 song, "When You Were Sweet Sixteen".

== Career ==
Thornton started his career as a "singing waiter" in Boston, Massachusetts, United States, and then achieved success with his then-wife, Elisabeth "Bonnie" Cox, in music halls throughout the US as what was then called a "serio-comic" or "monologist" (essentially a stand-up comic) and singer. During his career, he also performed in a vaudeville team with Charles B. Lawlor.

Thornton's compositions included: "When You Were Sweet Sixteen", "She May Have Seen Better Days", "The Irish Jubilee", "Two Little Girls in Blue", "When Summer Comes Around", "It Don't Seem Like the Same Old Smile", "My Sweetheart's the Man in the Moon", "Going for a Pardon", and "The Streets of Cairo".

On Broadway, Thornton's performed in Eddie Dowling's Sidewalks of New York and Oscar Hammerstein's Sweet Adeline. His last public appearance was in 1934 at the Forrest Theater in New York City.

== Private life ==
Little is known about his early life. According to the New York Times, he was born in Dublin, Ireland. According to the 1900 US census and his birth certificate, he was born of Irish parents, John Thornton and Catherine Molloy, in Liverpool, England. He emigrated with his parents and siblings to Boston, United States in 1869, became a US citizen in 1931, and died in New York City.

Margaret Bradford Boni wrote about him:

Thornton, genial, undependable, bibulous, was one of the greatest of the Tin Pan Alley songwriters and comedians. [...] Bonnie Thornton, his wife, a well-known singer of the day, worked there also, and part of her job, it is told, was to keep her husband from spending all of his money on drink. Thornton, returning home from a drinking spree on Independence Day, was met with Bonnie's tearful reproof and her sadly expressed doubt of his love and fidelity. Quickly he reassured her with the words, "My Sweetheart's the man in the moon." The words gave him the title and idea for one of his greatest songs, which was later sung with enormous success by Bonnie at Tony Pastor's 14th Street Theatre.

Apparently, this was a recurring theme in their marriage, as a similar story is told about the origin of "When You Were Sweet Sixteen".

James and Bonnie had no children. Despite being erroneously reported as still being husband and wife in 1920, and doing a performance together in 1919 under the presumption that they were still married, it would be revealed by 2007 that James and Bonnie had in fact secretly divorced at some point in the 1910s. After Bonnie died in 1920, Thornton married restaurateur Josephine Boyle.
