= No Man's Land (Eric Bogle song) =

1976 song by Eric Bogle

"No Man's Land" (also known as "The Green Fields of France" or "Willie McBride") is a song written in 1976 by Scottish-born Australian folk singer Eric Bogle, reflecting on the grave of a young man who died in World War I. Its chorus refers to two famous pieces of military music, "Last Post" and the "Flowers of the Forest". Its melody, its refrain ("did they beat the drum slowly, did they play the fife lowly"), and elements of its subject matter (a young man cut down in his prime) are similar to those of "Streets of Laredo", a North American cowboy ballad whose origins can be traced back to an 18th-century English ballad called "The Unfortunate Rake" and the Irish Ballad "Lock Hospital". In 2009, Bogle told an audience in Weymouth that he had read about a girl who had been presented with a copy of the song by then prime minister Tony Blair, who called it "his favourite anti-war poem".

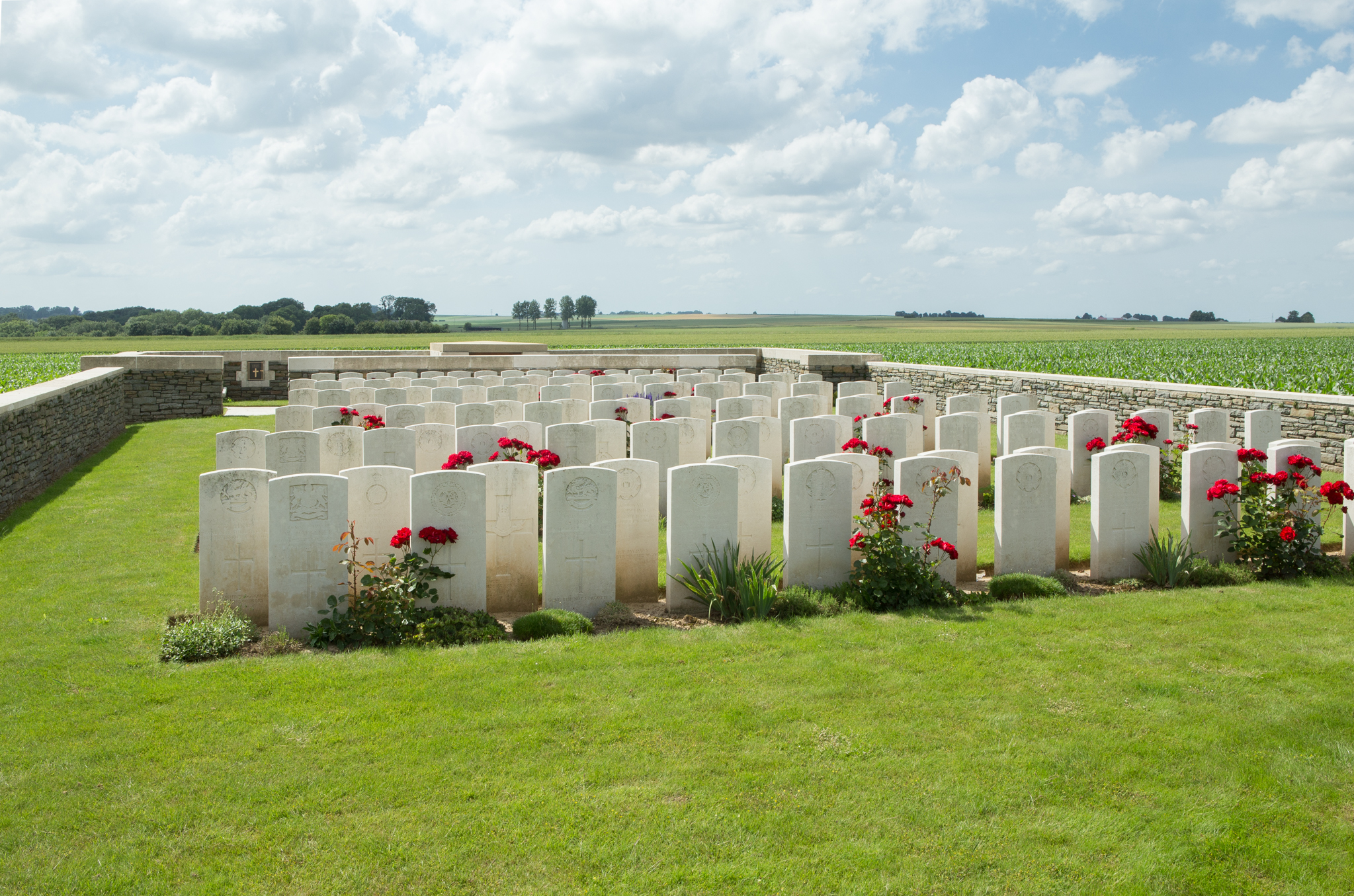
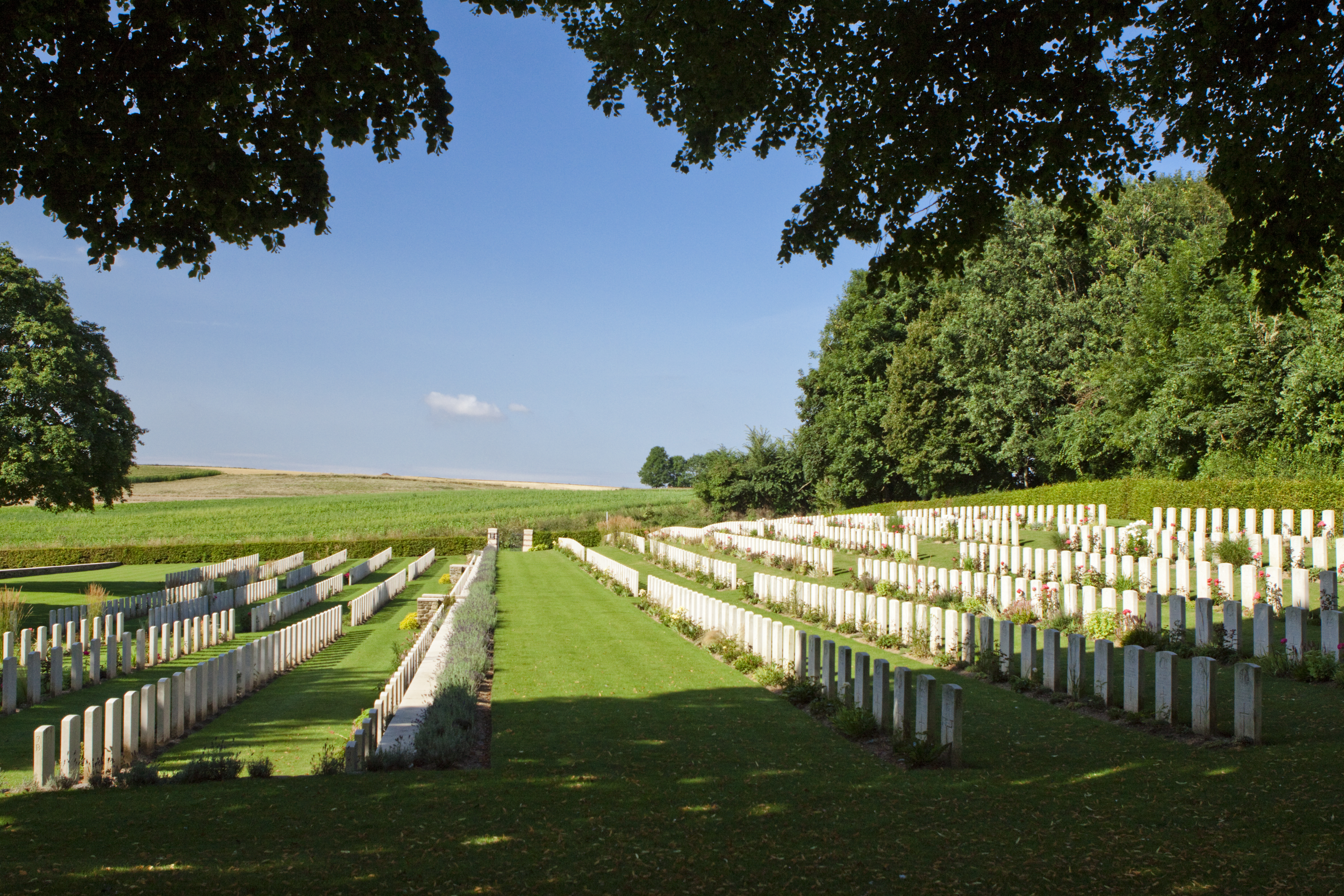
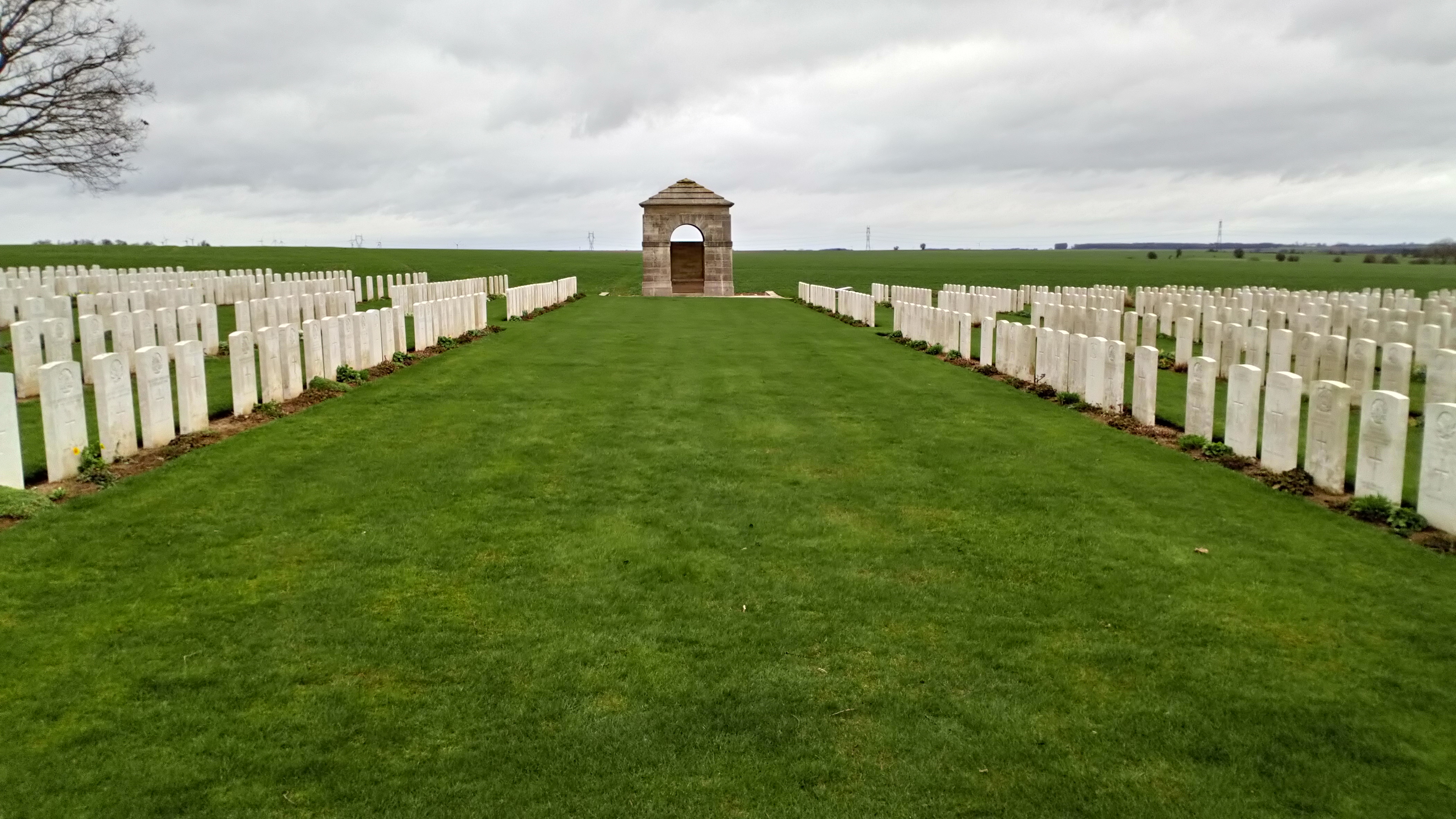
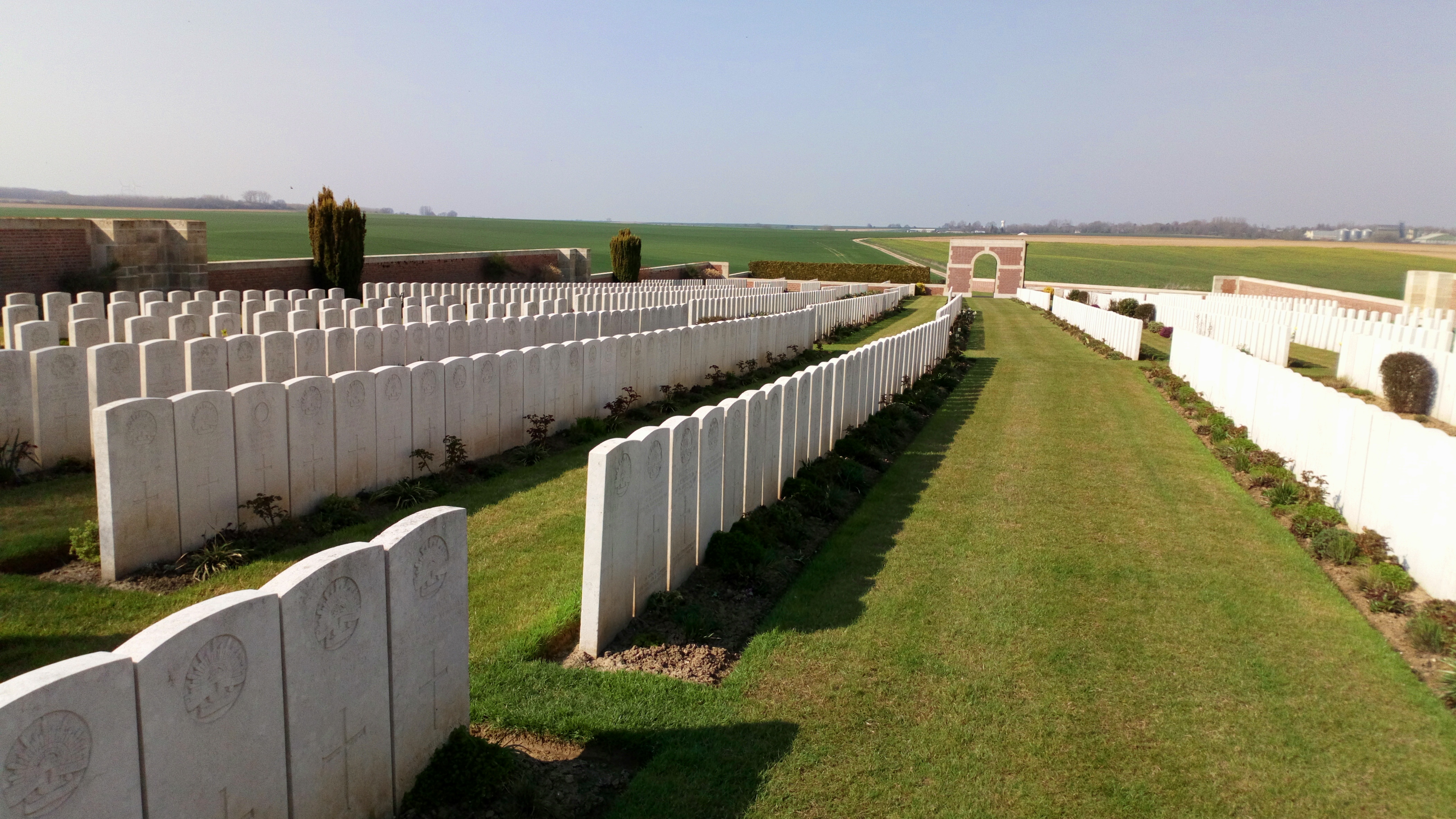
British World War I cemeteries in France. Clockwise from upper left: New Munich Trench British Cemetery, Contay British Cemetery, Puchevillers British Cemetery and Courcelette British Cemetery

According to Bogle, the framed copy of the poem credited him, but stated that he had been killed in World War I. He said: "It's a song that was written about the military cemeteries in Flanders and Northern France. In 1976, my wife and I went to three or four of these military cemeteries and saw all the young soldiers buried there."

== Identity of Willie McBride ==
Bogle himself has stated that he had no particular soldier in mind in choosing the name "Willie McBride"; "McBride" was simply a convenient rhyme for "grave side", and he also wanted to give the soldier an Irish name as a counter to the anti-Irish sentiment prevalent in Britain at the time.

According to the song, the gravestone of the soldier, Willie McBride, says he was 19 years old when he died in 1916. According to the Commonwealth War Graves Commission, there were eight soldiers named "William McBride", and a further six listed as "W. McBride", who died in France or Belgium during the First World War but none matches the soldier in the song. Two "William McBrides" and one "W. McBride" died in 1916 but one is commemorated in the Thiepval Memorial and has no gravestone. The other two are buried in the Authuile Military Cemetery but one was aged 21 and the age of the other is unknown. All three were from Irish regiments.

Piet Chielens, coordinator of the In Flanders Fields Museum in Ypres, Belgium, and organiser of yearly peace concerts in Flanders, once checked all 1,700,000 names that are registered with the Commonwealth War Commission. He found no fewer than ten Privates William McBride. Three of these William McBrides fell in 1916; two were members of an Irish Regiment, the Royal Inniskilling Fusiliers, and died more or less in the same spot during the Battle of the Somme in 1916. One was 21, the other 19 years old. The 19-year-old Private William McBride is buried in the Authuile Military Cemetery, near Albert and Beaumont-Hamel, where the Inniskillen Fusiliers were deployed as part of the 29th Division. The 19-year-old Private William McBride can be found at Grave A. 36, near the back of the cemetery.

Armagh historian Trevor Geary traced the Willie McBride (12/23965) to Roan Cottage, Roughan, Lislea in County Armagh BT60 3AF. This was based on the gravestone at Authuile Military Cemetery.

The name might have also been inspired by the naval pseudonym of Godfrey Herbert, the Captain of the Royal Navy, also nicknamed "Baralong Herbert" due to the infamous Baralong incidents. He was referred to as Captain William McBride through the war by the British admiralty and other authorities when mentioning the commander of the Baralong, to prevent any retaliation from the Germans should they reveal his identity upon capture.

== Cover versions and recordings ==
The song (as "The Green Fields of France") was a huge success for The Furey Brothers and Davey Arthur in the 1980s in Ireland and beyond. The melody and words vary somewhat from the Bogle original with some of the Scots phrases replaced (e.g., Did the rifles fire o'er ye? is often replaced by Did they sound the death march?).

It was later recorded by Dropkick Murphys, who changed the lyrics slightly. Film maker Pete Robertson used this version in his 2008 short film The Green Fields of France. The most famous version in the UK was by the Men They Couldn't Hang released in 1984.

The German version of the song "Es ist an der Zeit" (English: "Time has come [for change]") by Hannes Wader became one of the anthems of the German peace movement in the 1980s. It continues to be very popular till today, and has been covered by many other German artists. In Wader's version the soldier's name is unknown, and the lyrics are more accusatory in tone than in Bogle's version, with the German version's refrain going "They [i.e. the government] lied to you then, just like they still lie to us today".

Bogle has repeatedly stated that his own favourite recording of the song is by John McDermott. Other cover versions include:

- 1914 (2021) as "The Green Fields on France" on the album Where Fear and Weapons Meet
- Angelic Upstarts (1986), on the album Power of the Press
- Asonance (2000), in a Czech version "Zelené francouzské pláně" ("The Green Fields of France"), on the album Alison Gross
- Attila the Stockbroker (1987)
- Alex Beaton (1995), on the album The Water Is Wide
- Blackthorn on the album First Light
- Brassknuckle Boys (2009), as "Green Fields of France" on the album Appalachian Industry.
- Clare Bowditch, Tim Rogers and Gotye (2007)
- Jake Burns, on his album Drinkin' Again
- Neil Byrne and Ryan Kelly (of Celtic Thunder) as "No Man's Land" on the album Acoustically Irish
- Celtic Tenors (2002), on the album So Strong
- Celtic Thunder (2009), as "The Green Fields of France", on the album Take Me Home
- The Clancy Brothers
- Liam Clancy
- The Corries
- Donovan (1980), on the album Neutronica
- Dropkick Murphys (2005), as "The Green Fields of France", on the album The Warrior's Code
- Slim Dusty, on his album The Man Who Steadies The Lead as "No Man's Land."
- Euskefeurat, of Sweden, can be said to have made two covers, one borrowing the melody but changing the lyrics, the other borrowing the theme but changing the tune and most details.
- The Fenians (1999), on their album Band of Rogues
- Eric Fish, in the German version by Hannes Wader
- Tommy Fleming
- The Fureys and Davey Arthur (1979), as "The Green Fields of France", on the album The Green Fields of France
- Vin Garbutt (2014) on the album Synthetic Hues as "No Man's Land"
- Glengarry Bhoys (1999), as "Willie McBride" on the album Home Again
- Golden Bough as "Green Fields of France" on their album Golden Bough.
- Gordon Bok, Ed Trickett, and Ann Mayo Muir (1978), on their album The Ways of Man
- Kathy Hampson's Free Elastic Band
- Henry Marten's Ghost (2005), as "Green Fields of France" on the album High on Spirits!
- Priscilla Herdman (1982), on the album Forgotten Dreams
- The High Kings on the albums Memory Lane (2010), Grace and Glory (2016) and Home From Home (2021) as "Green Fields of France".
- The Houghton Weavers
- The Irish Tenors on Ellis Island as "The Green Fields of France"
- Iain MacKintosh (1976), on the album Live in Glasgow
- Jolly Rogers (2011), on the album Lose Cannons
- John McDermott (1993), on the album Battlefields of Green
- The Men They Couldn't Hang (1984), as "The Green Fields of France (No Man's Land)". This version reached No.1 in the UK Indie Singles Chart.
- Moke (2011), on the album Till Death Do Us Part
- North Sea Gas (2010), on the album Spirit of the Banished
- Off Kilter (2005), on the album Kick It!
- Pele (1992), as "The Green Fields of France" on the album Fireworks
- Peter, Paul and Mary (1990), as "No Man's Land", on the album Flowers and Stones
- Plethyn in a Welsh translation: "Gwaed ar eu Dwylo" (Blood on their Hands)
- Prussian Blue (2005), as "Green Fields of France", on the album The Path We Chose
- Renaud (2009), in a French version "Willie McBride", on the album Molly Malone – Balade irlandaise
- Saga
- Skrewdriver (1988), as "Green Fields of France" on the album After the Fire
- John Schumann and the Vagabond Crew (2008), on the album Behind the Lines
- Sons of Maxwell (1996), as "The Green Fields of France"
- The Sorries (2019), as "The Green Fields of France" on the album Chevalier's Muster Roll
- Stiff Little Fingers
- Stockton's Wing (1978), as "No Man's Land" on the album Stockton's Wing
- Joss Stone, feat. Jeff Beck – "Poppy Appeal" (2014)
- Ian Stuart Donaldson & Stigger (1991), as "Green Fields of France" on the album Patriotic Ballads
- June Tabor (1977), as "No Man's Land / The Flowers o' the Forest" (with the later song as an instrumental fade out of the former), on the album Ashes and Diamonds and on Folk Anthology
- Wacholder (1989), Interpretation of Waders German version on their Album Es ist an der Zeit
- Hannes Wader (1980), in a German version "Es ist an der Zeit"
- Charlie Zahm (1997), on the album Festival Favorites
- The Merry Wives of Windsor (band), on the album Tales from Windsor's Tavern(2007)

=== Joss Stone ===
A 2014 cover of "No Man's Land" by Joss Stone featuring Jeff Beck was produced as the Official Poppy Appeal Single for The Royal British Legion. The result was two recordings (one being a Radio edit), and a video set against the backdrop of the Tower of London focusing on the Poppies in the Moat installation.

The cover differed greatly from the original, mainly in that it contained only the lyrics from the first two and a half verses and so omitted the material that contained the anti-war sentiment underlying the song. There were several objections to this version of the song from individuals and organizations on such grounds as:

- the version sanitizes the anti-war message and gives the impression of a false history
- it insults the writer of the song and ultimately the people in the armed forces.

Bogle himself wrote a piece on the controversy for The Guardian website: he said that whilst he didn't approve of the dropping of verses and the "rock'n'roll arrangement" in Stone's version, he acknowledged that the latter was a matter of personal preference, and that "to do it acoustically and include all four verses and choruses would have made the song nearly seven minutes long and of doubtful commercial appeal in today’s music market", and that the broader appeal of Stone's recording would bring the song to the attention of people who would never have heard it before.

Bogle expressed the view that the cover version "certainly doesn’t glorify (war), but it doesn’t condemn it either... (it's) sentimentalising perhaps, trivialising even, but not glorifying". He concluded that neither he nor his publisher would be taking legal action against those involved with the cover, and that "I would have wished for a version of my song that could have been truer to my original intentions in writing it: illustrating the utter waste of war while paying tribute to the courage and sacrifice of those brave young men who fought. But if Joss’s cover touches a heart or two here and there and makes some people reflect, perhaps for the first time, on the true price of war, then her version will have a measure of validity and value".

== Willie McBride's reply ==
A writer named Stephen L. Suffet wrote a song in 1997, from the point of Willie McBride respectfully answering Bogle, set to the same tune as "No Man's Land", and saying that he doesn't regret fighting in the First World War. The lyrics were included in the book Eric Bogle, Music and the Great War: 'An Old Man's Tears'.

== See also ==
- List of anti-war songs
- "And The Band Played Waltzing Matilda"
- "Streets of Laredo"
