= When You Were Sweet Sixteen =

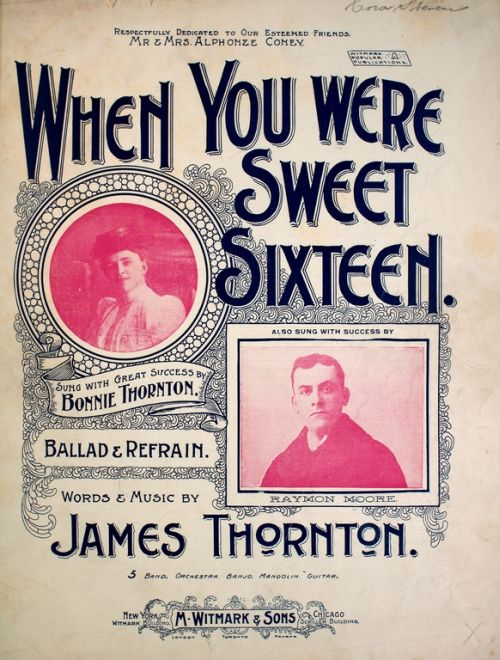
- Cover, sheet music, 1898

Song
- Language: English
- Published: 1898 by M. Witmark & Sons
- Songwriter: James Thornton

"When You Were Sweet Sixteen" is popular song written by James Thornton and published in 1898. Inspired and sung by the composer's wife, the ballad quickly became a hit song in vaudeville. It has a long recording history that includes numerous popular singers, has been heard on film, and is considered a standard for barbershop quartets.

== Origin ==
James Thornton was a vaudevillian best-known during his life for his comedy monologues; however, he composed numerous popular songs, especially in 1880s and 1890s. "When You Were Sweet Sixteen", published in 1898, was inspired by Thornton's wife, Bonnie, when she asked her husband if he still loved her. Thornton replied, "I love you like I did when you were sweet sixteen." Bonnie Thornton, a popular vaudeville singer who sang many of her husband's compositions, introduced the song in her act. (Note: The original sheet music advertised Bonnie Thornton as having sung the song with "great success".)

"When You Were Sweet Sixteen" sold over a million copies of sheet music. Thornton had sold it to two publishers, M. Witmark & Sons and Joseph W. Stern and Co., and it consequently became the subject of a lawsuit. (Note: Witmark had plugged the song and made it successful which precipitated Stern's suit; they settled out of court with a $5,000 payment by Witmark to Stern.)

== Lyrics ==
The lyrics of "When You Were Sweet Sixteen" are typical of the sentimental ballads of the 1890s. The form is strophic, two verses with a chorus.

Chorus:

I love you as I never lov'd before,
Since first I met you on the village green
Come to me, or my dream of love is o'er.
I love you as I lov'd you
When you were sweet, when you were sweet sixteen.

== Recording history ==
The song has been recorded by many artists in many styles, and over a period of more than a century.

=== Early recordings ===
"When You Were Sweet Sixteen" was the number one record in 1900. First recorded by Jere Mahoney on Edison Records, it became the number one record in April and held the spot for five weeks; it was also recorded by George J. Gaskin on Columbia and in November this record rose to number one as well, remaining so for eight weeks. Other artists followed quickly including J. W. Myers (1901, Victor 1145) and Harry Macdonough (1901, Victor 1769).

=== After 1946 ===
Perry Como's recording of April 10, 1947 was released by RCA Victor Records as catalog number 20-2259. The record first charted in Billboard on August 16, 1947, and lasted 12 weeks on the chart, peaking at No. 2. The song was one side of a two-sided hit; the flip side, "Chi-Baba, Chi-Baba (My Bambino Go to Sleep)", reached No. 1. The record was also released, with the same flip side, in the United Kingdom, by His Master's Voice with catalog number BD-1180. It was re-released in the USA in 1949 as a 78 rpm single (catalog number 20-3300-A) and a 45 rpm single (catalog number 47-2888), with the flip side "Song of Songs".

The 1947 revival of the song led to a number of artists recording it that year: (Note: The enormously successful film, The Jolson Story (1946), in which the song is sung, may also have contributed to the resurgence of interest.)

- Al Jolson with Vocal Chorus and Orchestra directed by Morris Stoloff (June 18, 1947, Decca Records 24106)
- Dick Jurgens and his Orchestra (vocal: Jimmy Castle) (1947)
- Steve Conway (April 5, 1948, UK Columbia F.B. 3398)
- Josef Locke (April 16, 1948, UK Columbia D.B. 2409)
- Joe Loss and his Orchestra (vocal by Howard Jones) (Recorded in London, March 11, 1948; released by EMI on the His Master's Voice label BD 6007)
- The Mills Brothers (January 1950, Decca 24764) (Note: The Mills Brothers also recorded this song in 1940 (Decca 3381) and 1946 (Decca 23627).)
- The Chordettes (1950)
- The Ink Spots (1959)
- Etta Jones (1975, on Westbound Records album)
- The Fureys with Davey Arthur, who took it to number 14 in the UK in October 1981
- Glen Campbell (1985, on It's Just a Matter of Time)
- Tommy Fleming (2009, on Live at Saint Patrick's Cathedral [DVD])
- Barry Manilow (2010, on The Greatest Love Songs of All Time)
- Jim Whitman (2011, on A Little Bit of Country)
- Chris Doran (2011, on Nothing's Gonna Change My Love for You)
- Daniel O'Donnell (2011, on Moon Over Ireland)
- Emmet Cahill (2017, on Emmet Cahill's Ireland)

== Other influence ==
"When You Were Sweet Sixteen" is a standard of barbershop quartets.

The song has been used in films a number of times. In the 1930 military comedy High C's, starring Charley Chase, it was sung by the soldiers while they are being bombed. Shirley Temple sang it in 1938 in the movie Little Miss Broadway. In the 1946 film The Jolson Story, it was sung by Rudy Wissler dubbing for Scotty Beckett who was portraying the young Al Jolson.

This song also appears in the 1987 film Ironweed starring Jack Nicholson and Meryl Streep. A mustachioed barkeep sings this song behind his bar.

The song was sung in 2019 by the Steve Coogan character Martin Brennan in the comedy series This Time with Alan Partridge.
