= The Fureys =

Irish folk band

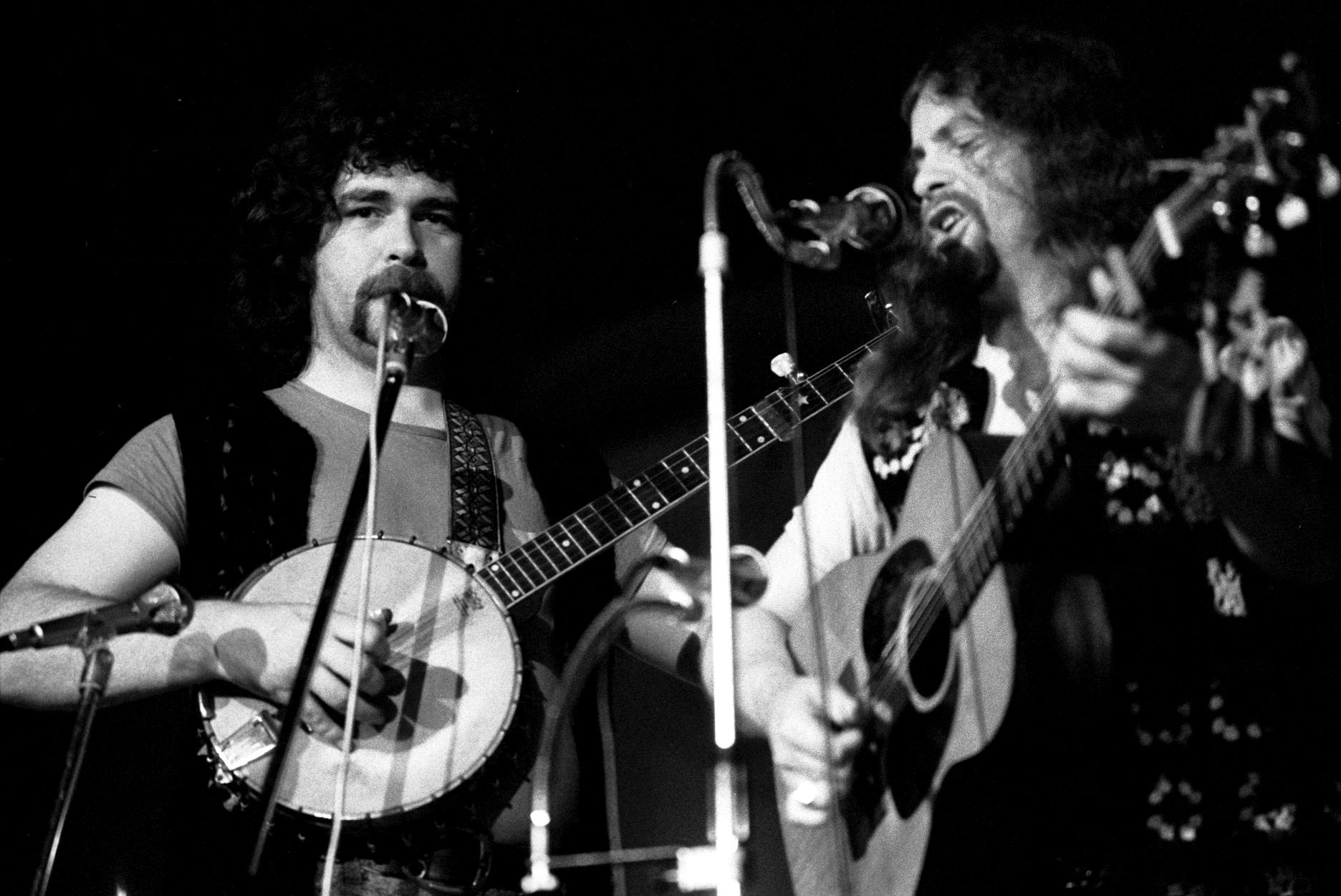
- Finbar & Eddie Furey, Musikhalle, Hamburg, in October 1974

Background information
- Also known as: The Fureys and Davey Arthur, The Furey Brothers, The Furey Family
- Origin: Dublin, Ireland
- Genre: Folk music
- Years active: 1974–present
- Label: Dolphin Records
- Members: Eddie Furey; George Furey; Adam Kelly; Camillus Hiney; Tony Murray
- Past members: Finbar Furey; Paul Furey (deceased); Dominic Leech
- Website: The Fureys.com

The Fureys are an Irish folk band who originally formed in 1974. The group initially consisted of four brothers who grew up in Ballyfermot, Dublin.

Brothers Eddie, Finbar, Paul and George Furey are of Irish Traveller heritage. Two of the band's singles have been number one hits in Ireland, and two of their albums charted in the United Kingdom. In collaborations with Davey Arthur, they have also been credited as The Fureys and Davey Arthur.

== History ==
=== Background ===
Prior to the band's formation, two of the brothers toured as a duo, known simply by their names as Eddie and Finbar Furey. For a while in 1969–1970, the duo performed with the Clancy Brothers and appeared on two of the Irish folk group's albums. The second of these albums contained two songs composed by the Fureys, "Flowers in the Valley" and "Jennifer Gentle". Meanwhile, their youngest brother Paul Furey had, together with Davey Arthur and Brendan Leeson, formed a band called the Buskers. Eddie and Finbar and the Buskers appeared together in Germany at the "Irish Folk Festival" in 1974, where they performed as the Furey Brothers. The Buskers, now with the addition of George Furey, appeared there again a year later as the Furey Family, when they were joined by their father Ted, a renowned traditional fiddler, who was 73 at that time. Ted Furey had recorded a solo fiddle album, Toss the Feathers, which was released by the Outlet label in 1967.

In 1969, they released their debut album The Lonesome Boatman. It is best known for its title track which is played hauntingly on a tin whistle, as well as its version of the traditional ballad "Carnlough Bay". The song has featured at football matches, most notably performed by fans of Glasgow team Celtic FC. In 2017, Dropkick Murphys released a cover of "The Lonesome Boatman" on their album 11 Short Stories of Pain & Glory.

=== Band ===
Finbar, Eddie, and Paul Furey formed a folk group called Tam Linn in 1976 with Davey Arthur. When their brother George joined them later that year, the band changed their name to the Furey Brothers and Davey Arthur. They eventually simplified their name to the Fureys and Davey Arthur (and just the Fureys when Arthur did not perform with them). The band started out playing traditional Irish folk music, but quickly changed their sound, leaving the folk music behind, and turned to mainstream easy-listening songs and ballads.

In 1981 the Fureys released their most successful single, "When You Were Sweet Sixteen", which became a worldwide hit, reaching No. 14 on the UK Singles Chart, No. 1 on the Irish Singles Chart and No. 9 on the Australian Singles Chart. "The Green Fields of France" (a title commonly but incorrectly given to Eric Bogle's "No Man's Land") also gave them an Irish No. 1, remaining in the single charts for twenty-eight weeks. They also had two Top 40 British albums called Golden Days and At the End of the Day.

Other notable songs include "Gallipoli", "The Red Rose Cafe", and "Steal Away". As of October 24, 2019, the band were still recording and touring. In 2018, the band celebrated their 40th anniversary.

Finbar left the band to begin his own solo career in 1996, with Eddie, George, and Davey Arthur continuing some touring in Ireland, the UK and the European continent. Paul Furey died suddenly in June 2002.

All four of the brothers married and had children. Finbar's son, Martin Furey, is a folk singer and musician with The High Kings. His daughter, Áine Furey, is an Irish singer. George's son Anthony is the singer with the Young Folk. Eddie's daughter Sarah-Jane is a streamer in the video gaming industry.

== Discography ==
=== Ted Furey and Brendan Byrne ===
- Toss The Feathers, Outlet, 1967

=== Eddie and Finbar Furey ===
- Finbar and Eddie Furey, Transatlantic, 1968
- I Know Where I'm Going, Waverley, 1968, (with Paddie Bell)
- The Lonesome Boatman, Transatlantic, 1969
- The Dawning of the Day, Dawn, 1972
- Four Green Fields, Pläne, 1972
- Irish Pipe Music: Hornpipes, Airs and Reels, Nonesuch, 1974
- I Live Not Where I Love, Intercord, 1975
- A Dream in My Hand, Intercord, 1976
- The Farewell Album, Intercord, 1976
- The Town Is Not Their Own, HPE, 1981
- Finbar and Eddie Furey, Harp, 1982

=== The Clancy Brothers (with Finbar and Eddie Furey) ===
- Christmas, Columbia, 1969
- Flowers in the Valley, Columbia, 1970

=== Finbar Furey ===
- Traditional Irish Pipe Music, Transatlantic, 1969
- The Irish Pipes of Finbar Furey, Nonesuch, 1972
- Prince of Pipers, Intercord, 1974
- Peace & Enjoyment, Love & Pleasure, Greentrax, 1987 (with Brian McNeill and Blackeyed Biddy)
- Love Letters, BMG, 1990
- The Wind and the Rain, Nora, 1997
- The Finbar Furey Songbook, 2003 (by Pauric Mather)
- Chasing Moonlight: Love Songs of Ireland, Hybrid, 2003
- New York Girls, Rough Diamond, 2003, (EP)
- The Last Great Lovesong, Pinorekk, 2014

=== Áine Furey ===
- Sweetest Summer Rain, Celtic Connections, 1999
- Cross My Palm, Cosmic Trigger Records, 2008

=== Ted Furey ===
- Irish Folk Music, Arfolk, 1972

=== The Buskers ===
- Life of a Man, Rubber Records, 1973
- The Buskers, Hawk, 1974

=== The Fureys and Bob Stewart ===
- Tomorrow We Part, Crescent, 1976
- Aran: Celtic Gypsy Music, 1999

=== The Furey Family ===
- The Furey Family, Intercord, 1977

=== The Fureys and Davey Arthur ===
- Emigrant, Polydor, 1977
- Morning on a Distant Shore, Polydor, 1977
- Banshee, Dolby, 1978
- The Green Fields of France, Banshee, 1979
- The Sound of the Fureys and Davey Arthur, Polydor, 1980
- When You Were Sweet Sixteen, Banshee, 1982
- Steal Away, Banshee, 1983
- In Concert, RTÉ, 1983
- Golden Days, K-Tel, 1984
- At The End of the Day, K-Tel, 1985
- The First Leaves of Autumn, 1986
- Red Rose Café/Irish Eyes/Sitting Alone, 1987,(EP)
- Dublin Songs, 1988
- Poor Man's Dream, 1988
- The Scattering, 1988
- Alcoholidays
- The Best of the Fureys and Davey Arthur, 1993

=== The Fureys ===
- Wind of Change, Shanachie, 1992
- Claddagh Road, 1994
- May We All Someday Meet Again, 1996
- Twenty One Years On, 1999
- The Essential Fureys, 2001
- The Fureys Sing Chaplin, 2001
- My Father's House, 2003
- I Will Love You, 2003
- 25th Anniversary Collection, 2003
- My Father's House, 2005
- The Times They Are a Changing, 2014
- 40 Years.....to be continued, 2018
