= Authuile Military Cemetery =

CWGC cemetery in Somme, France

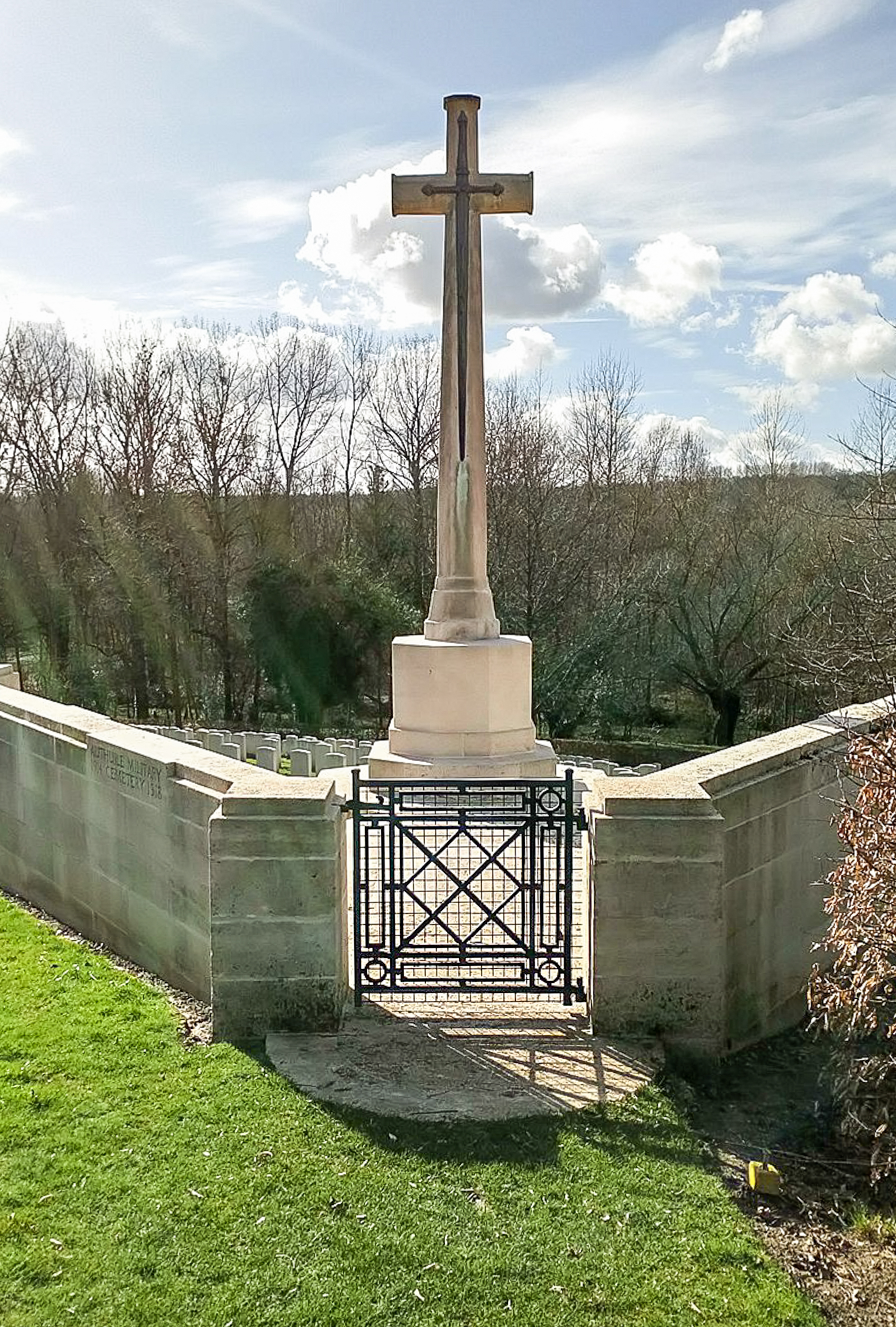
- Memorial at the Authuile Cemetery

Details
- Established: 1915
- Location: Authuile, Somme, France
- Country: Great Britain and Commonwealth
- Coordinates: 50°02′26″N 2°39′57″E
- Type: Military
- Size: 2650 sq m
- No. of graves: 450+, 435 identifiable
- Website: cwgc.org
- Find a Grave: Authuile Military Cemetery

The Authuile Military Cemetery is a cemetery located in the Somme region of France commemorating British and Commonwealth soldiers who fought in the First World War. The cemetery contains soldiers who died on a variety of dates in several battles near the French village of Authuile.

== Location ==
The cemetery is located on the south side of the village of Authile, approximately 5 km north of Albert, France.

== Conflict near Authuile ==
The village was destroyed by shell fire while under the control of the British from summer 1915 to March 1918, when it was captured in the German Offensive on the Somme. It was used by the British from August 1915 to December 1916, and from 1917 to 1918 by Indian Labour Companies.

== Establishment of the cemetery ==
=== History ===
The cemetery was used by field ambulances and fighting units from August 1915 to December 1916 and in 1917 and 1918 by Indian Labor Companies. Two German soldiers have been removed from the cemetery since burial.

=== Statistics ===
Of the 472 graves in the cemetery, 435 are identified and approximately 40 are unidentified. Special memorials are dedicated to 18 British soldiers known to be buried among the unknown. The cemetery covers an area of 2650 square meters and is enclosed by a concrete curb.

Identified Casualties by Nation
Nation	Number of Known Burials
United Kingdom	472
India	14
South Africa	3
Germany	1

Number of Burials by Unit
Royal Inniskilling Fusiliers	63	Royal Irish Rifles	41
West Yorkshire Regiment	41	Lancashire Fusiliers	38
Dorsetshire Regiment	24	Highland Light Infantry	24
King's Own Yorkshire Light Infantry	23	Northumberland Fusiliers	23
Duke of Wellington - West Riding Regiment	15	York & Lancaster Regiment	15
Border Regiment	11	Gordon Highlanders	11
Manchester Regiment	10	Royal Field Artillery	10
Royal Engineers	9	Argyll & Sutherland Highlanders	7
Machine Gun Corps	6	Black Watch	5
South Lancashire Regiment	5	Indian Labour Company	4
Northamptonshire Regiment	4	Loyal North Lancashire	3
Royal Sussex	3	Seaforth Highlanders	3
South African Heavy Artillery	3	Worcestershire Regiment	3
29th Lancers - Deccan Horse	2	9th Hodson's Horse	2
Cheshire Regiment	2	Durham Light Infantry	2
King's Liverpool Regiment	2	King's Own Scottish Borderers	2
Royal Garrison Artillery	2	11th King Edward's Own Cavalry	1
19th Lancers - Fane's Horse	1	31st Duke of Connaught's Own Lancers	1
36th Jacob's Horse	1	37th Lancers	1
6th King Edward's Own Cavalry	1	East Surrey Regiment	1
Gloucestershire Regiment	1	Hampshire Regiment	1
Inniskilling Dragoons	1	Middlesex Regiment	1
Royal Fusiliers	1	Royal Horse Guards	1
Royal Irish Fusiliers	1	Somerset Light Infantry	1
Wiltshire Regiment	1		
