= Tony Pastor =

American variety performer and theatre owner (1837–1908)

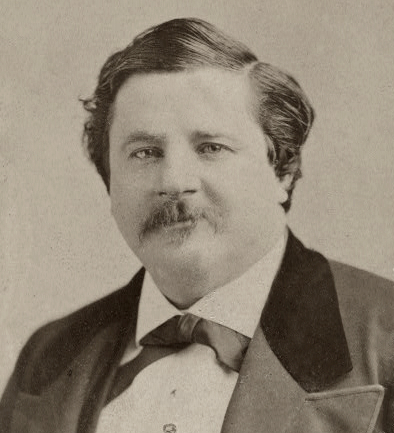
- Born: Antonio Pastor; May 28, 1837; New York City, New York, U.S.A.
- Died: August 26, 1908 (aged 71); Elmhurst, Queens County, New York, U.S.
- Occupations: Vaudeville entertainer, showman and theatre manager
- Writing career
- Years active: 1846–1905

Antonio Pastor (May 28, 1837 – August 26, 1908) was an American impresario, variety performer and theatre owner who became one of the founding forces behind American vaudeville in the mid-to-late-nineteenth century. He was sometimes referred to as the "Dean of Vaudeville". The strongest elements of his entertainments were an almost-jingoistic brand of United States patriotism and a strong commitment to attracting a "mixed-gender" audience, the latter being something revolutionary in the male-oriented variety halls of the mid-century. Although he was a performer and producer, Pastor is best known for "cleaning up" bawdy variety acts and presenting a clean and family-friendly genre called vaudeville.

A collection of his papers is maintained at the Harry Ransom Humanities Research Center at the University of Texas in Austin, and in the archives of the New York Public Library for the Performing Arts.

== Life and career ==
=== Family ===
Antonio Pastor, father of Tony, was a fruit-seller, barber, and violinist from Spain. His family was reputed by contemporaries to be "of gypsy blood". He met his future wife, Cornelia Buckley, who was from New Haven, Connecticut, after he came to New York. They then lived in Manhattan. Their third child, and first son, also named Antonio Pastor, was born in Manhattan in 1837 at his parents' residence at 400 Greenwich Street, in what is now the financial district of lower Manhattan. He had a taste for entertaining when he was young, producing his own plays in the basement of his family's home.

=== Early career ===
In 1846, Pastor embarked on a career in show business. He obtained a job singing at P.T. Barnum's Scudder's American Museum where he brought his riding, tumbling, and mimicry skills to performances.

During the next few years he worked in minstrel shows, where he often performed scenes in blackface. Pastor became a celebrated singing clown at a time when circus performances typically concluded with a variety revue. He established himself as a popular singer and songwriter during a four-year run at Robert Butler's American Music Hall, a variety theater located at 444 Broadway in what is now called Soho, but was then the heart of the lower Manhattan theater district. Pastor published "songsters", books of his lyrics which were sung to popular tunes. The music had no notation, as it was assumed that the audience had a collective knowledge of popular song. The subject matter of his music was intended to be bawdy and humorous.

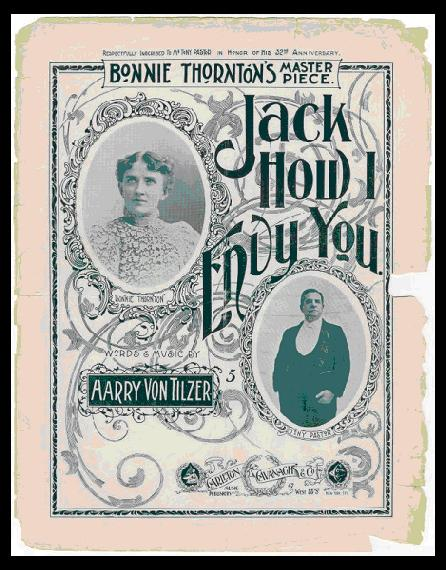
Tony Pastor and Bonnie Thornton, c. 1897

Pastor sang for the Union cause throughout the Civil War, then started his own variety show which went on tour for around five months before settling in New York City. In 1865, Pastor opened his own theatre, Tony Pastor's Opera House. The theater was located on the Bowery in partnership with minstrel show performer, Sam Sharpley, whom he later bought out. The same year he organized traveling minstrel troupes who toured the country annually between April and October. Although Pastor was referred to as the "Dean of Vaudeville", as mentioned before, he is best known for cleaning up variety acts. Pastor was popular with the nearly all-male variety theater audiences; however, he knew that his ticket sales would double if he attracted a female audience. Soon he began to produce variety shows, presenting an evening of clean fun that was a distinct alternative to the bawdy shows of the time and more appropriate for middle-class families. With shows that appealed to women and children as well as the traditional male audience, his theater and touring companies quickly became popular with the middle classes and were soon being imitated.

=== Later career ===
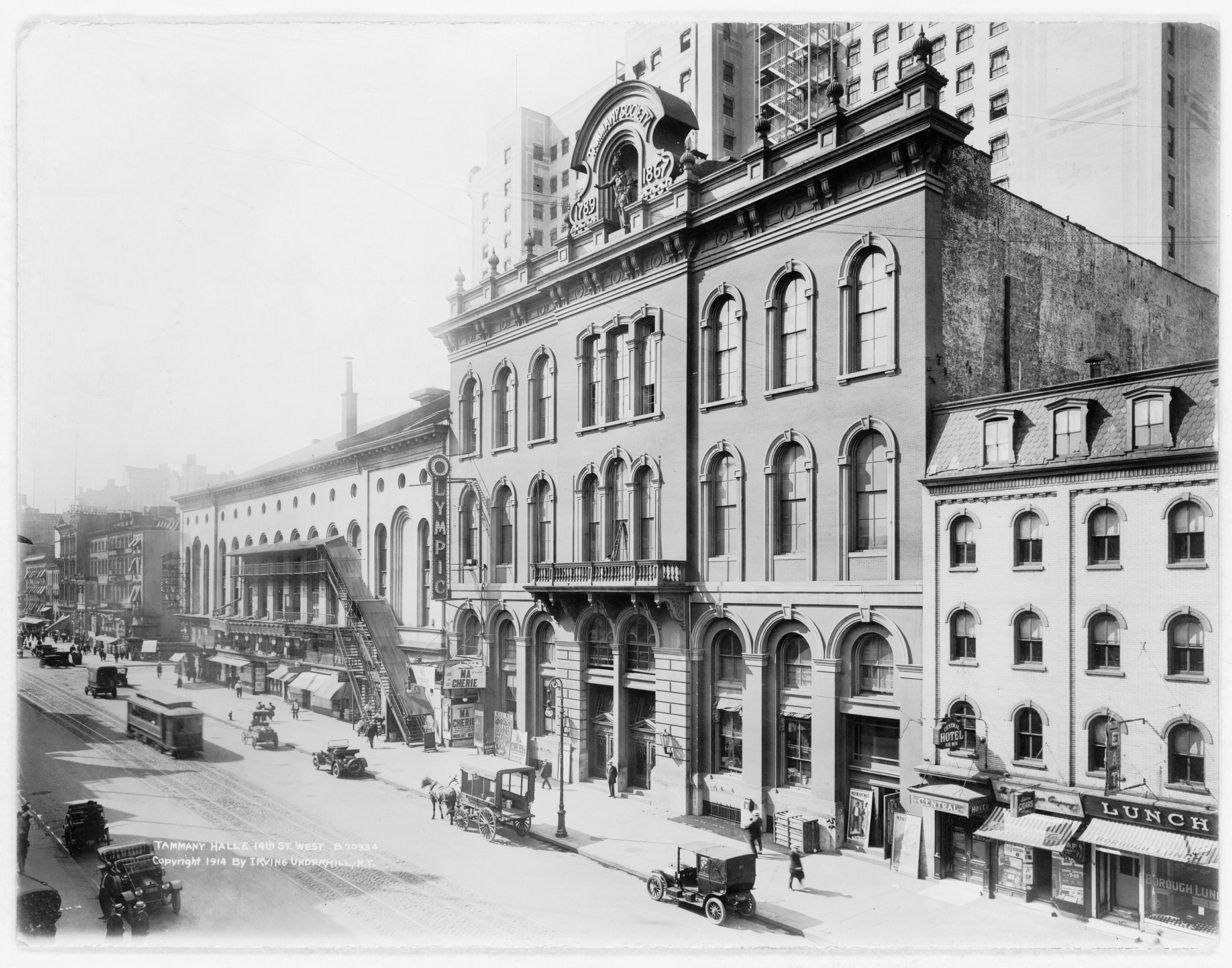
Tammany Hall in 1914

In 1874, Pastor moved his company a few blocks to take over Michael Bennett Leavitt's former theater at 585 Broadway. The theater district was moving uptown to Union Square, however, and in 1881 Pastor took a lease on the former Germania Theatre on 14th Street in the same building that housed Tammany Hall. He alternated his theater's presentations between operettas and family-oriented variety shows, creating what became known as vaudeville. Vaudeville was popular with the masses from the 1880s to the 1910s. Pastor wanted to capture a mass audience by bringing family entertainment to the middle class. In order to do this, Pastor sought out to make vaudeville "respectable". He did not sell liquor in his theatre and required a level of decency to his performances which encouraged women and families to attend.

His theater featured performers such as Ben Harney presenting a new style called "ragtime" as well as other up-and-coming talents such as Weber and Fields, Al Jolson, George M. Cohan, Sophie Tucker, Lillian Russell, Buster Keaton, Gus Edwards, Chauncey Olcott, Ella Wesner, Eva Tanguay, Blossom Seeley, W.C. Fields, May Irwin and Eddie Leonard. Harry S. Sanderson was his business manager from 1878 until 1908. The business records from this period are available to researchers.

In the musical Hello, Dolly!, the song "Put On Your Sunday Clothes" includes the line, "We'll join the Astors at Tony Pastor's". It also references seeing "the shows at Delmonico's", which suggests that the character does not really know about upper-class social life in New York.

=== Death ===
Tony Pastor died in Elmhurst, Queens County, New York, on August 26, 1908, and was interred in the Cemetery of the Evergreens in Brooklyn. He was 71, and though greatly mourned at his death as one of the last gentlemen of the early vaudeville halls, the medium had passed him by with the advent of the vaudeville circuit in the 1880s. Pastor had remained a local showman in an epoch that increasingly came to be dominated by regional and national chains. Fighting against the monopolies for the rights of individual local showmen was an undertaking that marked the last years of his life, earning him the nickname of "Little Man Tony".

== Afterpieces ==
Throughout the 1880s, Pastor's performances often had an afterpiece following it. They played a major role in his shows, often written in the final act of the program. The afterpieces were written by a group of regular writers, and sometimes Pastor himself. They lasted anywhere from fifteen minutes to an hour. There were three categories; pantomime, melodrama, and parodies. Pastor's afterpieces became popular from 1865 to 1875, and because of its popularity, the afterpieces became a staple in Pastor's shows. Although the afterpieces were all different, they all dealt with what is meant to be a working-class citizen in New York. Not only did the afterpieces discuss issues such as crime and poverty, but they also discussed leisure activities the working class couldn't afford. This made Pastor's audiences respond well to the afterpieces, since the working class was his target audience.

List of Known Afterpeices
Title	Type of Pantomime	Where	Date	Author
Masaniello; or, Fish Catcher of Naples	Parody	Tony Pastor's Opera House	March 11, 1867	Unknown
The White Crook	Parody	Tony Pastor's Opera House	June 3, 1867	John F. Poole
Romeo and Juliet; or, the Beautiful Blonde who Dyed for Love	Parody	Unknown	March 15, 1869	John F. Poole
Macbeth	Parody	Tony Pastor's Opera House	April 18, 1870	Unknown
Yeast Lynne; or, The Humors of Lady Isabel	Parody	Tony Pastor's Opera House (and other theaters around town)	March 26, 1877	T.R. Hann
Go West!; or, the Emigrant Palace Car in an Uproar	Parody	Tony Pastor's Opera House	Around 1879	William Carleton or William A. Mestayer
The Pie-Rats of Penn Yann	Parody	Tony Pastor's Opera House	February 14, 1881	John F. Poole
Mysteries of Gotham	Melodrama	Tony Pastor's Opera House	September 10, 1866	John F. Poole
New York Mechanics	Melodrama	Unknown	June 15, 1868	Unknown (Possibly John F. Poole)
Joe Kidd in Fistiana	Melodrama	Tony Pastor's Opera House	January, 1868	Unknown
High Life and Low Life; or, Scenes in New York	Melodrama	Tony Pastor's Opera House	March 8, 1869	Unknown (Possibly Charles F. Seabert)
The Tenth Ward by Day and Night	Melodrama	Tony Pastor's Opera House	February 24, 1873	Charles F. Seabert

== Music ==
According to the humor of the time, Pastor wrote several songs that negatively portrayed ethnic stereotypes, such as "The Contraband's Adventures", the story of a freed slave. After the slave is set free by Union soldiers, he attends an anti-slavery meeting where the abolitionists try to scrub off his dark pigment. The slave concludes by singing...

...De nigger will be nigger till de day of jubilee
For he never was intended for a white man.
Den just skedaddle home-leave de colored man alone;
For you're only making trouble for de nation;
You may fight and you may fuss
But you never will make tings right
Until you all agree for to let de nigger be
For you'll neber, neber, neber wash him white!

Though he separated some ethnic groups in his music, he also intended to unite the lower and middle classes. In songs like "The Upper and Lower Ten Thousand", he defended the common man of the Bowery:

If an Upper-Ten fellow a swindler should be
And with thousands of dollars of others make free
Should he get into court, why, without any doubt,
The matter's hushed up and they'll let him step out.
If a Lower-Ten Thousand chap happens to steal,
For to keep him from starving, the price of a meal,
Why the law will declare it's a different thing-
For they call him a thief, and he's sent to Sing-Sing!
