= Davey Arthur =

Irish folk singer

- Born: Davey Pat Arthur; 24 September 1954 (age 72); County Donegal, Ireland
- Genres: Celtic, folk
- Occupation: Musician
- Instruments: Vocals, guitar, banjo, mandolin
- Years active: 1977–present
- Formerly of: The Fureys and Davey Arthur

Davey Pat Arthur (born 24 September 1954 in County Donegal) is an Irish folk singer.

== Early life ==
Originally from Donegal, Arthur moved to Scotland at the age of two. He started to play music at the age of eight, and returned to Ireland aged 18.

== Career ==
Known for playing the banjo, mandolin and guitar, he was originally a solo artist before joining with the Furey Brothers in 1978. Touring and performing as The Fureys and Davey Arthur, the group had several number one singles in Ireland in the 1970s and 1980s, and a top 20 hit in the UK singles chart in 1981.

Arthur left the Fureys in 1992, pursuing a solo career and undertook a number of solo tours. He later rejoined some of the original lineup of the Fureys and Davey Arthur for a number of tours and albums. Living in County Kerry for some years, as of early 2019 Arthur had not returned to touring with the Fureys (having reputedly suffered a stroke in 2014).

== Discography ==
Davey Arthur has written over 40 compositions, that have featured on 28 albums.

Solo albums

- Celtic Side Saddle (1994)
- Cut to the Chase (1998)

The Buskers (with Paul Furey and Brendan Leeson)

- Life Of A Man Rubber Records RUB 007 (1973)

The Fureys & Davey Arthur (Studio Albums)

- Emigrant (1977)
- Morning on a Distant Shore (1977)
- Banshee (1978)
- When You Were Sweet 16 (1981)
- Steal Away (1983)
- Golden Days (1984)
- In Concert (1984)
- At the End of the Day (1985)
- The First Leaves of Autumn (1986)
- Red Rose Café (EP) (1987)
- Poor Man's Dream (EP) (1988)
- The Scattering (1988)
- Alcoholidays (1998)
- Gallipoli (2007)
