= Bonnie Thornton =

American vaudeville comedian and singer (c.1871–1920)

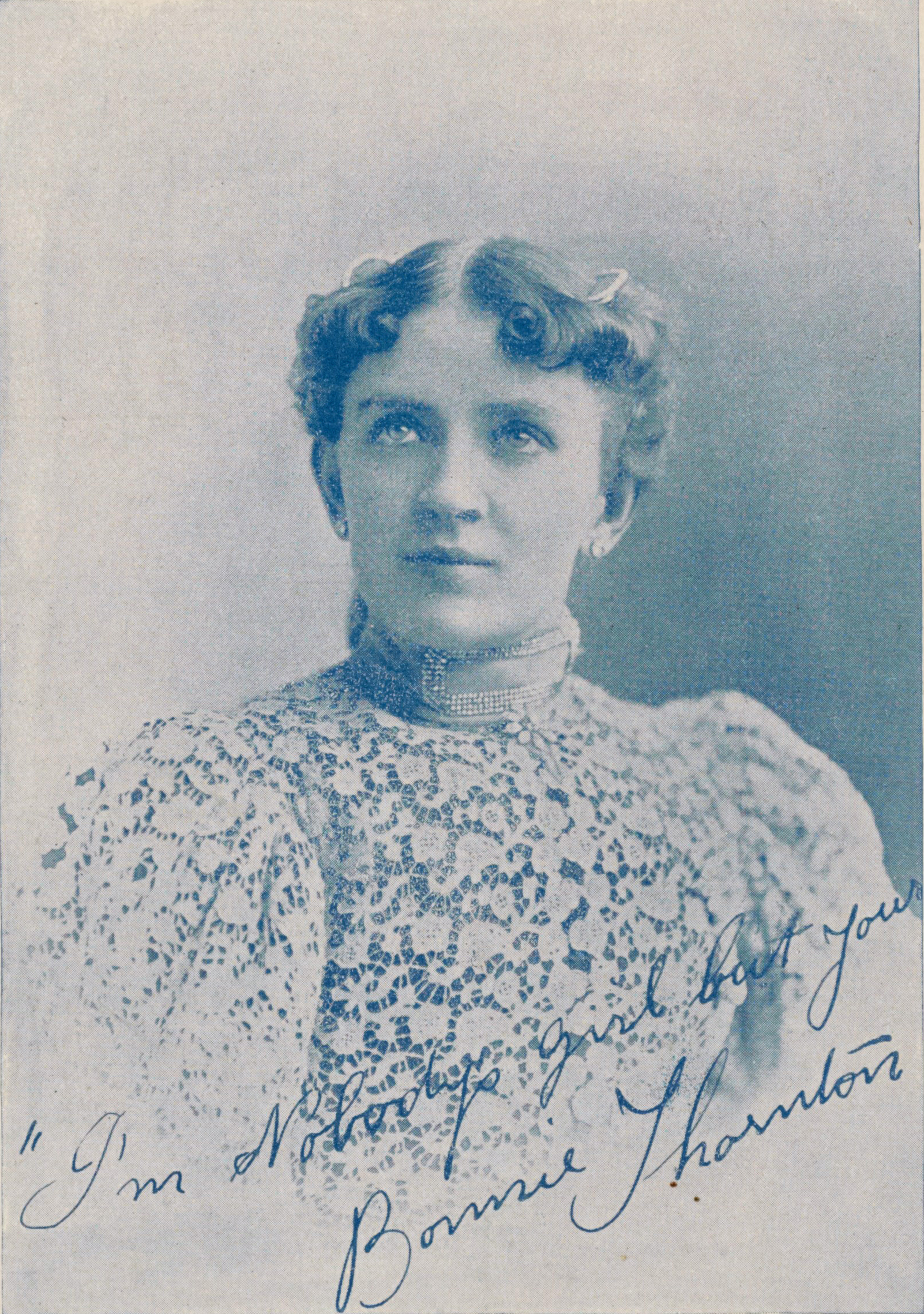
Bonnie Thornton (circa 1896)

Elizabeth "Bonnie" Thornton (née Cox; c. 1871 – March 13, 1920) was an American vaudeville comedian and singer. She was considered "one of vaudeville's first headliners" and a "popular seriocomic singer".

== Life and career ==
Thornton was born as Elizabeth Cox around 1871 in the old 4th Ward of New York. In 1885, she married the songwriter and singer James Thornton after a courtship that lasted two years. The couple had no children. She began her theater career at age 17 as a seriocomic, performing sentimental and comic songs, and appearing in concert halls.

By 1888, Thornton made her debut at Tony Pastor's Theatre as a singing comedian. In 1893, she began performing in vaudeville as a double act with James Thornton, her husband. She sang James Thornton's music in her performances, and helped make a number of his pieces popular during the time, including the song, "My Sweetheart's the Man in the Moon". She performed this new song during the start of the 1893 season at Tony Pastor's, along with the song "After Dark".

Thornton became a local favorite at Tony Pastor's, and was sometimes a featured singer on his theater bills. She continued to be an entertainer at Tony's until at least 1903. Thornton also performed in variety acts on stage, and vaudeville on tour. She entertained at Allen's Bal Mabille on Bleecker Street, where James was also a singing waiter.

In the 1910s, she and Jim divorced, although at the time of her death, they were reported as husband and wife; their divorce, which occurred in secrecy, would be publicly disclosed by 2007.

Around 1915, Thornton began to run a millinery business in New York City, which she operated until her death. Her last vaudeville performance was with James- who was at the time publicly presumed to still be her husband- in 1919. She died of double pneumonia in New York City on March 13, 1920.
