= Black & White Records =

American record company and label

- Founded: 1943
- Founder: Les Schreiber
- Defunct: 1949
- Status: Defunct
- Genre: Jazz, blues
- Country of origin: U.S.
- Location: New York City

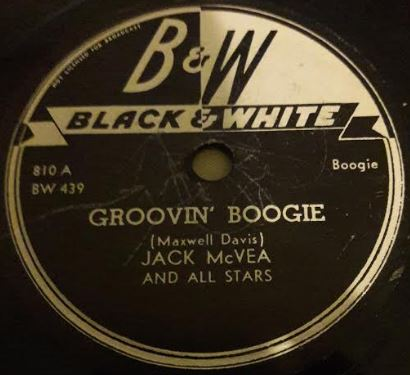
1947 Jack McVea phonograph record produced by the Black And White label

Black & White Records was an American record company and label founded by Les Schreiber in 1943. It specialized in jazz and blues. When the label was sold to Paul and Lillian Reiner, it moved from New York City to Los Angeles. The catalog included music by Art Hodes, Cliff Jackson, Lil Armstrong, Barney Bigard, Wilbert Baranco, Erroll Garner, Jack McVea, and Willie "The Lion" Smith.

Ralph Bass was the recording director. The name was chosen to indicate that black and white musicians were signed to the label.

== Early days ==
Black & White Records was founded in 1943 by Les Schreiber (1901–1965), (Note: Les Schriber's full name was Lester Wilmot Wilbert Schriber, Sr.) and was located at 2117 Foster Avenue, Brooklyn, New York. The company initially issued recordings by Art Hodes and Cliff Jackson.

In 1945, Paul Reiner (6 December 1905, Hungary–1 February 1982, Los Angeles) and his wife, Lillian (née Drosd; 28 April 1908, Massachusetts–4 September 1982, Los Angeles), purchased the company, moved it to Los Angeles, and hired Ralph Bass to be recording director. Soon after that, Schreiber worked for Swan Records but left Swan around October 1946. (Note: "Music – As Written: New York" October 12, 1946, pg. 34) Paul Reiner was president, his wife was vice president, Samuel Madiman was treasurer, and Larry Newton was sales manager.

Bass oversaw two of the most important records in the early evolution of rock and roll: "Stormy Monday" by T-Bone Walker (1946) and a rare crossover hit, "Open the Door, Richard" by Jack McVea (1947). In 1948, Bass left Black & White to start Bop Records.

== Sales and agreements ==
Comet Records, owned by Les Schreiber, was sold to Black & White Records not long after their third recording session (with Red Norvo and Charlie Parker).

On August 11, 1947, B&W Records and Jewel Records (not to be confused with Je–Wel) entered a distribution agreement that gave B&W an option to acquire Jewel. Reiner retained his post as president of B&W while Ben Pollack, Jewel's president, entered as general manager of B&W's West Coast operations, overseeing the A&R department. Reiner moved his headquarters east and centered his operations on Chicago to strengthen the label's Midwestern distribution. The catalogues of B&W and Jewel were merged as a result of the deal. Pollack brought 10 unreleased masters of Martha Davis and Marion Morgan. Pollack also had a contract with Boyd Raeburn stipulating that the orchestra could record for a major label, but Jewel held an exclusive on all independent releases. The deal also increased the number of race records, i.e. records made by blacks that were marketed to blacks. (Note: "Distrib Link: B&W to Jewel" August 16, 1947, pg. 19)

The first recording of "Open the Door, Richard" by Jack McVea was recorded on this label. Lena Horne recorded for this label in 1946 and 1947. Although they were novices in the business and were not specializing in rhythm and blues (R&B), they made a significant contribution, largely through the efforts of Bass, who recorded Roosevelt Sykes and T-Bone Walker.

In March 1949, Newton left B&W as sales manager to become general manager of Peak Records. Moses Asch replaced him as sales manager at B&W. (Note: "Supreme Files 16G Action vs. Black & White" March 19, 1949, pg. 23) Around that same time in 1949, Newton, while operating Derby, started Central Records with Lee Magid, and Treat Records in New York City; worked with Impulse! Records, became president of ABC-Paramount Records in 1965, and ran Crossover Records (founded in 1973 by Ray Charles).

== Masters ==
On October 8, 1949, after shutting down B&W Records, Paul Reiner offered several hundred masters for sale, some released, some not. He appointed Al Katz (Katzenberger) to negotiate sales on his behalf. The sale was offered in units, ordered by artists. Katz gave first right of refusal to the artists. (Note: "B&W Records Masters on Sale Block" October 15, 1949, pg. 19)

Reiner had sold the masters from sessions by Art Tatum, Cyril Nathaniel Haynes, and Red Norvo/Charlie Parker to Ross Russell, the owner of Dial Records. The deal was closed via telephone on June 21, 1949.

Capitol Records bought the Black & White masters of T-Bone Walker in 1949 and gave the titles new matrix numbers. Capitol then issued 16 tracks on 8 individual 78 rpm shellac disks (10 previously unreleased masters and 6 reissued masters) in 1949 through 1950. Capitol also put out a 10-inch LP consisting of 8 of these 16 tracks in 1953, titled T-Bone Walker: Classics in Jazz (Capitol H-370).

Black & White was one of the first companies to issue 12-inch 78 rpm discs in unbreakable material.

== Cover version controversy ==
In 1948, Supreme Records recorded in Los Angeles and released "A Little Bird Told Me," written by Harvey Oliver Brooks (1899–1968), sung by Paula Watson (1927–2003), who is African American, accompanied by guitarist Mitchell "Tiny" Webb, and others. Her version spent 14 weeks on Billboard's R&B charts in 1948 and 1949, reaching number 2 on the R&B charts and number 6 on the pop charts. In 1948, Decca released a cover version, sung by Evelyn Knight (1917–2007), who was white. Knight copied Watson's singing to the degree that it fooled musical experts brought into court as witnesses. Knight was accompanied by a band that included Walter Page on bass, the Stardusters (vocal group), and Johnny Parker (vocal and hand-clapping). Supreme claimed that Decca had stolen aspects of its original recording, including its arrangement, texture, and vocal style. Race was not an issue in the case, but the case served as an example of white performers covering the work of black artists in the 1950s.

The court ruled in favor of the defense, upholding a ruling that musical arrangements are not copyrightable property – individual interpretations or arrangements of a given style could not be protested under the law. This case opened the door for cover versions. In the 1950 ruling Supreme Records, Incorporated, a small label owned by Al Patrick (Albert T. Patrick; 1910–1973), who was African American, lost the case in United States District Court for the Central District of California, Southern Division, against Decca Records, Inc., a large record label.

Black & White Record Distributors, Inc. had been one of the two original plaintiffs but withdrew on a motion by the defendant, leaving Supreme as the sole plaintiff. Black & White participated in the case because it had been the manufacturer and distributor of Supreme's line.

Separately from the "Little Bird" case, Supreme had sued Black & White, contending that B&W had no right to turn over its line to two Canadian firms, Monogram and Dominion, who had been pressing and distributing in Canada. On April 2, 1949, Supreme & B&W settled their dispute out of court. (Note: "Supreme, B&W Bury Hatchet Out of Court" April 9, 1949, pg. 19)

Supreme was soon out of business, and by December 1949, Paula Watson was working for Decca.

Black & White Records had a publishing subsidiary, Paul Reiner Publishing Company. (Note: "Green to Manage B&W Diskery" February 26, 1949, pg. 20)

== Employees ==
- Ralph Bass (1911–1997), producer
- Bruce Altman, formerly of American Recording Artists (A.R.A.) Records
- John Blackburn
- Mack (aka Mac or Max) Green (né Mordecai Green; 1901–1979), manager (replaced John Blackburn, February 1949)

== Artist roster ==
- Eduardo Abreu
- Buzz Adlam
- Ernestine Allen
- Ivie Anderson
- Lil Armstrong
- Wilbert Baranco
- Barney Bigard
- June Brewer
- Ramon Bruce
- Red Callender
- Gaylord Carter
- Dick Cary
- Buck Clayton
- Zeke Clements
- Rod Cless
- Clover Leaf Jubilee Quartet
- Vic Corwin
- Maxwell Davis
- Nick De Lano
- Phil De Vorn
- Hank Duncan
- Estelle Edson
- Jo Evans
- Four Aces
- Sammy Franklin
- Jan Garber
- Erroll Garner
- Al Gayle

- Maggie Hathaway & Her Bluesmen...
  1. Maggie Hathaway, vocal
  2. Ramon LaRue, piano
  3. Teddy Bunn (aka Theodore Leroy Bunn), guitar
  4. Julius Gilmore, bass
  5. Samuel E. Joshua, drums

- Cyril Haynes
- Bob Hayward
- Shifty Henry (aka John Willie Henry)
- Bennie Hess (with The Texas Dandies aka Tex Williams' Western Caravan)

- Hip Chicks (all female band) ...
  1. Marjorie Hyams (vibraphone)
  2. L'Ana Hyams (tenor sax; née Alleman; 1912–1997), the bandleader - married to Marjorie's brother: jazz pianist Mark Hyams (1914–2007); was formerly married to jazz guitarist Jimmy Webster (1908–1978).
  3. Jean Starr (trumpet)
  4. Vicki Zimmer (piano)
  5. Marian Gange (guitar)
  6. Cecilia Zirl (bass)
  7. Rose Gottesman (drums), ... plus special guest:
  8. Vivien Garry (vocal)

- Art Hodes
- Lena Horne
- Helen Humes
- The Original Hurtado Brothers & Their Royal Marimba Band
- Cliff Jackson
- Nat Jaffe
- Cee Pee Johnson
- Etta Jones

- Ralph Bass' Junior Jazz at the Auditorium
  1. Ralph Bass' Junior Jazz at the Auditorium were recordings of jam sessions held by Bass in Compton, California, at teenage/college functions with name jazz musicians brought in as guests. (Note: "Black & White Signs Phil Moore and T-Bone" September 14, 1946, pg. 17) The first live recording session was on August 26, 1946, and included
    1. Howard McGhee (tp)
    2. Les Robinson (as)
    3. Jack McVea (ts)
    4. Lucky Thompson (ts)
    5. Jimmy Bunn (p)
    6. Irving Ashby (g)
    7. Red Callender (b)
    8. Jackie Mills (d).
    Also participating were
    1. Slim Gaillard
    2. Les Paul
    3. Nick Fatool
    4. Ivie Anderson.
    Bass hosted these sessions, in part, to help fight juvenile delinquency. (Note: "B&W's Bass Battles Juve Delinquency With Jazz Sessions" August 24, 1946, pg. 21)

- Linda Keene
- Al Killian
- Henry King
- Dick Lane
- Al Lerner
- Ella Logan
- Mike Loscalzo
- Joe Marsala
- Jeannie McKeon
- McNeil Choir
- Jack McVea
- Oklahoma Ed Moody
- Sister Etta Mooney
- Phil Moore
- Buck Nation (with The Six Westernaires)
- Chino Oritz
- Will Osborne
- Oscar Pettiford
- Alton Redd
- Lucius "Mushmouth" Robinson
- Al Sack
- St. Paul Choir of Chicago
- Allen Schrader
- Gene Schroeder (Note: Born Eugene Charles Schroeder, 5 Feb 1915 Madison, Wisconsin; died 16 Feb 1975 Madison, Wisconsin)
- John Sellers
- Charlie Shavers
- Fiddlin' Arthur Smith
- Willie "The Lion" Smith
- Cactus Andy (aka Andrew Soldi from Tex Williams' Western Caravan)
- Rudy Sooter
- Earle Spencer
- Tim Spinosa
- Spirits of Rhythm
- Ray Stokes
- Roosevelt Sykes
- Rabon Tarrant
- Kay Thomas
- Tommy Todd
- T. Texas Tyler (with The Six Westernaires)
- Charlie Ventura
- T-Bone Walker
- Annette Warren
- Artie Wayne
- George Wettling
- Lariese Williams
- Eileen Wilson
- Gawdalike
- Gerald Wilson

== See also ==
- List of record labels
