= Duke Henderson =

American singer

- Born: Sylvester C. Henderson; April 5, 1925 probably Liberty, Missouri, U.S.
- Died: April 9, 1973 (aged 48) Pacoima, Los Angeles, California
- Genres: Blues, jazz
- Instrument: Vocals
- Years active: 1945–1953
- Label: Various including Apollo

Sylvester C. Henderson (April 5, 1925 – April 9, 1973), known as Duke Henderson, was an American blues shouter and jazz singer in the West Coast blues and jump blues styles in the mid-1940s. In the late 1940s he renounced his past and began broadcasting as a minister and gospel music disc jockey. He eventually became a preacher.

== Music career ==
Apparently born in Liberty, Missouri, Henderson lived in Los Angeles, California, from the 1940s onward. In 1945, he made his debut recordings with the New York–based Apollo record label. Jack McVea recommended Henderson to the label, and he was backed on the recording dates by several notable Los Angeles session musicians, including McVea, Wild Bill Moore and Lucky Thompson (saxophones), Gene Phillips (guitar), Shifty Henry and Charles Mingus (bass), and Lee Young and Rabon Tarrant (drums). The recordings were not a commercial success and Henderson lost his recording contract with Apollo.

In 1947, Al "Cake" Wichard recorded for Modern Records billed as the Al Wichard Sextette, with vocals by Henderson. Henderson subsequently recorded material for a number of labels over several years. His work was released by Globe, Down Beat, Swing Time, Specialty ("Country Girl" b/w "Lucy Brown", October 1952), Modern, and Imperial. Henderson ended up at Flair Records, where his 1953 release, "Hey Mr. Kinsey", was billed as recorded by Big Duke, and displayed a knowledge of the then current thinking on human sexual activity.

Later in the decade, Henderson renounced his past and, billed as Brother Henderson, commenced broadcasting on XERB (the radio station that later broadcast Wolfman Jack). His ministerial career there as a gospel music DJ career was short-lived. In the late 1950s Henderson broadcast on KPOP in Los Angeles. After his DJ career, he became a preacher at Bethany Apostle Community Church.

In February 1959, Billboard reported that Proverb Records was being jointly formed by Brother Henderson. By 1964 its subsidiary label, Gospel Corner, was initiated.

Henderson died in Los Angeles in 1973, although some sources state 1972.

In 1994, Delmark issued a compilation CD containing 20 tracks from Henderson's recordings for Apollo in late 1945.

== Compilation album ==
Album title	Record label	Year of release
Get Your Kicks	Delmark Records	1994

== See also ==
- List of West Coast blues musicians
