= Al "Cake" Wichard =

American jazz musician

Al "Cake" Wichard (born Albert C. Wichard, August 15, 1918 or 1919 — November 14, 1959) was an American blues and jazz drummer, especially active as a recording artist in the late 1940s.

== Biography ==
He was born in Morrilton, Arkansas, in either 1918 or 1919. Associated for many years with the Bihari Brothers’ recording labels and artists, he appeared on many recordings for Modern Records. He appeared at an Apollo Records recording session in Hollywood, California, on August 2, 1945, with Illinois Jacquet (tenor saxophone), John Brown, (alto saxophone), Arthur Dennis (baritone saxophone), Bill Doggett (piano), Ulysses Livingston (guitar), and Charles ‘Charlie’ Mingus (bass).

By the mid-1940s Wichard was a member of various bands led by Johnny (or Johnnie) Alston with King Fleming, William 'Brother' Woodman, Wilbert Baranco, Buddy Harper, Addison Farmer, George Vann, Oscar Lee Bradley, one of which backed Wynonie "Blues" Harris.

He later appeared on several Jimmy Witherspoon recordings made for the Modern label between 1946 and 1951 with Gal Friday (vocals); Mitchell "Tiny" Webb (guitar); Chuck Norris (guitar); Frank Sleet (alto saxophone); Ben Webster (tenor saxophone); Jay McShann (piano); Maxwell Davis (tenor saxophone); Buddy Floyd (tenor saxophone) and Gene Gilbeaux, (piano). According to Witherspoon, "Cake Wichard got me that major label recording contract,..."

In 1947, he also recorded for Modern with his own line-up, the Al Wichard Sextette, featuring vocals by Big Duke Henderson. A member of the King Perry Orchestra in 1947, they recorded backing Hoagy Carmichael in Los Angeles. Between 1947 and 1951, Wichard recorded with Gene Phillips and his Rhythm Aces, again for Modern Records with the guitarist Gene Phillips, plus Lloyd Glenn, Maxwell Davis, Marshal Royal, Jake Porter and Jack McVea.

He recorded with Smokey Hogg (guitar and vocals), Hadda Brooks (piano), Bill Davis (bass). And with Brooks again in 1948 with Teddy Bunn on guitar and Red Callender on bass.

By July 1949 he had joined the James Von Streeter Septet with Nat Meeks (trumpet) Walter Henry (alto saxophone), Hampton Hawes (piano), Chuck Norris (guitar), Shifty Henry (bass), and Herman Pattus (vocals), which recorded in Los Angeles, California. During this period he also recorded with Sister Wynona Carr and Brother Joe May, and also with Little Willie Littlefield. Wichard appears as a drummer in a jazz club scene, in the film noir movie, D.O.A. in 1950.

He died in Los Angeles in 1959.

== Albums/CDs ==
- Cake Walkin' (The Modern Recordings 1947–48) (Ace #CHD-1233, 2009)
