= Sunny Gale =

American singer (1927–2022)

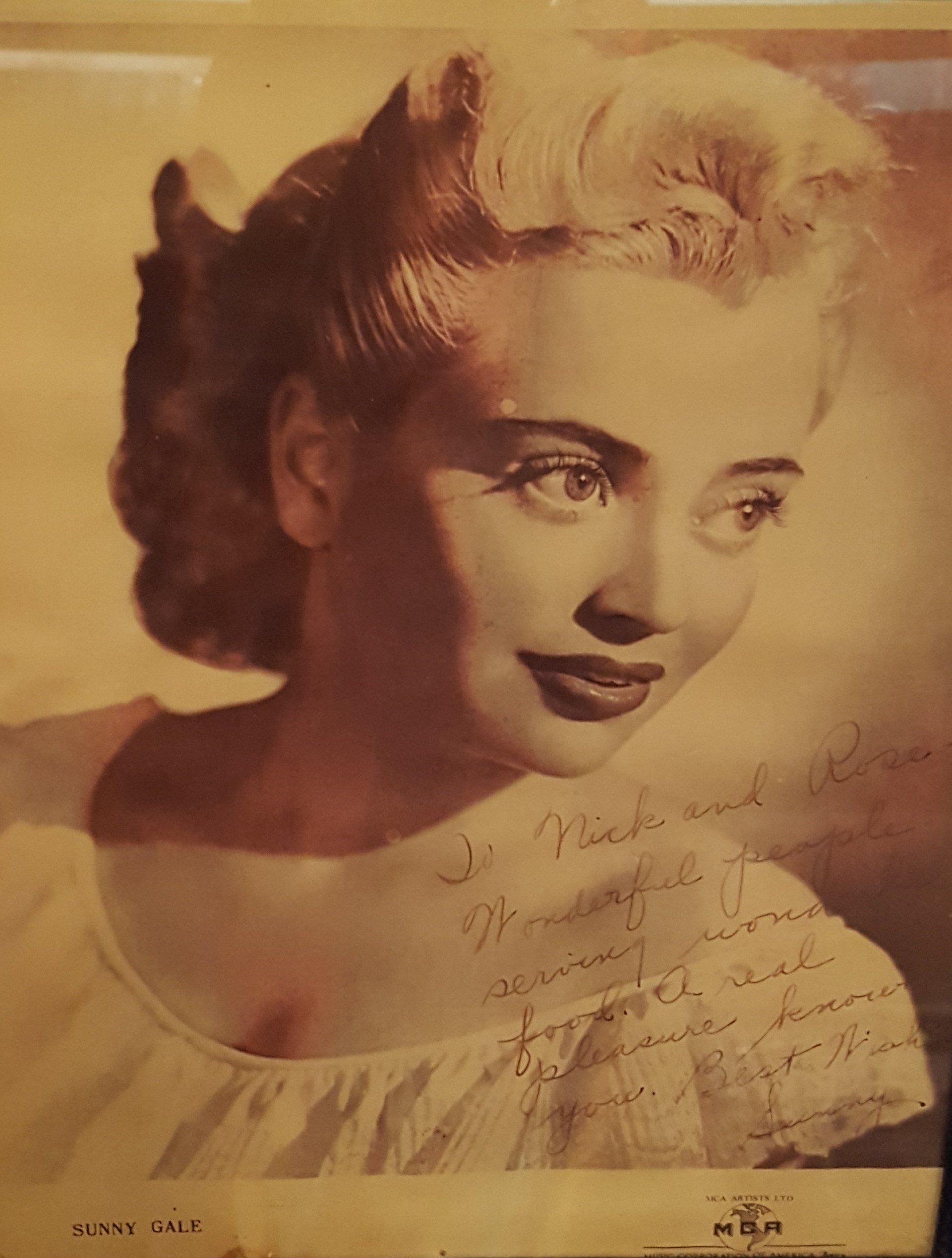
- c. 1950

Background information
- Born: Selma Segal; February 20, 1927; Clayton, New Jersey, U.S.
- Died: 2022 (aged 94–95) Florida, U.S.
- Genres: Pop music
- Occupation: Singer
- Years active: c. 1943–late 1950s
- Labels: Derby, RCA Victor, Warwick

Sunny Gale (born Selma Segal, February 20, 1927 – 2022) was an American pop singer who was popular in the 1950s. Gale reached the Billboard Hot 100 several times throughout the earlier half of the decade, scoring her biggest hit with "Wheel of Fortune" with the Ed Wilcox Orchestra in 1952.

== Biography ==
Gale was born as Selma Segal in Clayton, New Jersey, where she competed in singing contests at an early age, sometimes against future musicians Eddie Fisher and Al Martino. After participating in the Miss Philadelphia beauty contest at 16 years old, and reaching the finals with her vocal prowess, Segal began receiving contracts to establish herself on the city's nightclub circuit. Segal performed in Philadelphia for five years, and was going by the stage name Sunny Gale since at least August 1948, which is evident by her early photoshoots. The following year, Gale joined bandleader Hal McIntyre's orchestra on a series of successful concerts across the United States and Canada.

Gale's manager Gary Romero secured a recording contract with Derby Records in 1951. In accordance with Romero's suggestion, Gale recorded "Wheel of Fortune", a song written by Bennie Benjamin and George David Weiss. However, as soon as other rival record companies saw the potential of a hit, several artists recorded the composition in rapid succession, including Sammy Kaye, the Bell Sisters, and the Cardinals. Gale's rendition, nonetheless, managed to chart at number 13 on the Billboard Hot 100, but was soon overtaken by Kay Starr's novelty take on "Wheel of Fortune", which became a number one hit.

Gale's chart battle with Starr resulted in bookings across the East Coast, including a stint at the Paramount Theater in New York City. Gale recorded two additional singles for Derby, "A Lasting Thing" and "My Last Affair", but the small label could not effectively promote the releases as well as "Wheel of Fortune". Despite the commercial successes of Gale and label-mates Trudy Richards and Bette McLaurin, Derby filed for bankruptcy in October 1954. In 1952, Gale signed with RCA Victor where she recorded a string of nationally charting singles during the next four years, including "I Laughed at Love", "Teardrops on My Pillow", "Love Me Again", "Goodnight, Sweetheart, Goodnight". During this time, Gale appeared in clubs operated by business owner Frank Palumbo, including his entertainment complex Palumbo's, and at the Brooklyn Academy of Music in an all-star benefit show which also featured the Ink Spots, Red Buttons, Lena Horne, and several others.

By mid-1956, Gale had signed with Decca Records, debuting with a rendition of Otis Williams and the Charms' "Two Hearts". But for Gale, subsequent releases on Decca, Warwick Records, and Blaine Records could not propel her back into the national charts as she suffered the fate of most pre-rock pop singers. Also in 1956, she appeared on the Dorsey Brothers’ stage TV show.

As of 2015, Gale was resided in a retirement home in Florida. Despite her string of pop hits, she was not as well remembered as contemporaries like Patti Page and Rosemary Clooney, and it was not until the late 1990s that compilation albums, such as The Story of Sunny Gale and Sunny Gale Sings, began to document Gale's recording career.

In January 2023, theatrical producer and press agent Alan Eichler revealed that Gale died in Florida in 2022.

== Discography ==
=== Charting singles ===
- Feb. 1952: "Wheel of Fortune" (with Eddie Wilcox Orchestra) – Derby 787 – Billboard No. 13
- Sept. 1952: "I Laughed at Love" (with Ralph Burns Orchestra) – RCA Victor 4789 – No. 14
- Jan. 1953: "Teardrops on My Pillow" / "A Stolen Waltz" (with Ralph Burns Orchestra) – RCA Victor 5103 – No. 12 / No. 15
- Sept. 1953: "Love Me Again" / "Before It's Too Late" (with Hugo Winterhalter Orchestra) – RCA Victor 5424 – No. 22 / No. 27
- July 1954: "Goodnight, Sweetheart, Goodnight" (with Joe Reisman Orchestra) – RCA Victor 5746 – No. 27
- Sept. 1954: "Smile (Theme from Modern Times)" (with Hugo Winterhalter Orchestra) – RCA Victor 5836 – No. 19
- Jan. 1955: "Let Me Go, Lover!" / "Unsuspecting Heart" (with Hugo Winterhalter Orchestra) – RCA Victor 5952 – No. 17 / No. 14
- Nov. 1955: "C'est La Vie" (with Joe Reisman Orchestra) – RCA Victor 6286 – No. 85
- Apr. 1956: "Rock and Roll Wedding" (with Joe Reisman Orchestra) – RCA Victor 6479 – No. 66

=== Albums ===
- Sunny And Blue With Ralph Burns And His Orchestra (RCA Victor, 1956)
- Sunny (Warwick, 1961)
- Goldies by the Girls (Canadian American, 1964)
- Sunny Sings Dixieland Blues (Thimble Records, 1974)
