= Supreme Records (Los Angeles) =

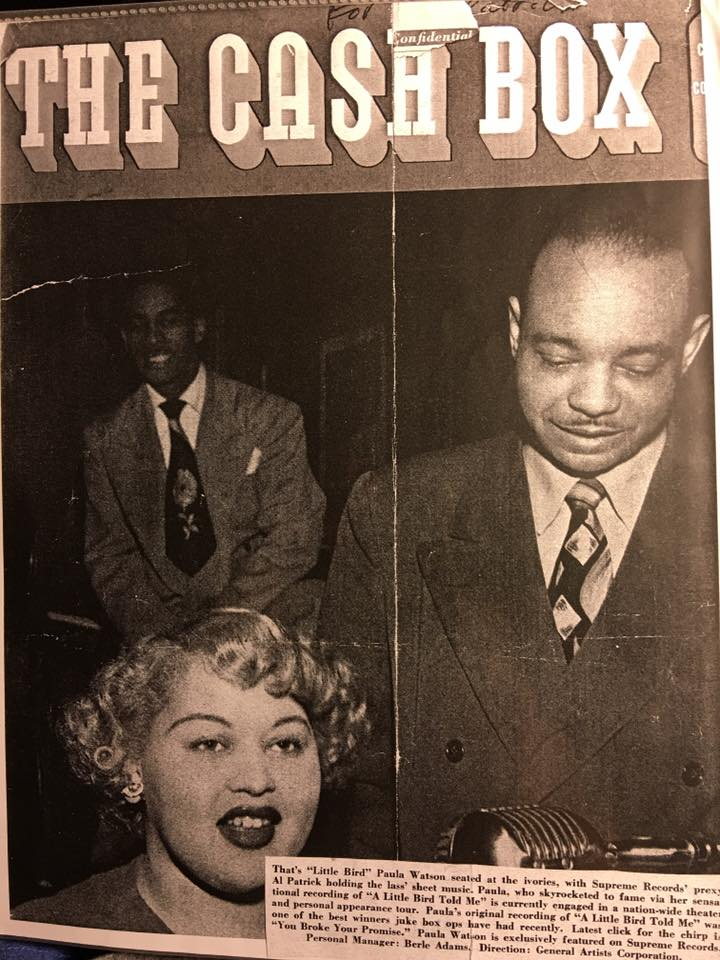
- Paula Watson (left), Albert Patrick (right); Cash Box magazine late 1940s
- Founded: 1947
- Founder: Albert Patrick
- Defunct: 1950
- Status: Defunct
- Distributor: Black & White Records
- Genre: R&B
- Country of origin: United States
- Location: Los Angeles, California

Supreme Records was a small, independent record label based in Los Angeles that existed from 1947 to 1950. It was founded by dentist Albert Patrick and specialized in rhythm and blues. Its artists included Jimmy Witherspoon, Paula Watson, Buddy Tate, Eddie Williams and his Brown Buddies (with Floyd Dixon), Big Jim Wynn, and Percy Mayfield.

== Hits ==
Supreme's two greatest hits were Paula Watson's "A Little Bird Told Me", which sold over a million copies, and Jimmy Witherspoon's version of "Ain't Nobody's Business", recorded on Albert Patrick's request, which lasted 34 weeks on Billboard's Rhythm & Blues hit list.

== Lawsuits ==
Supreme got involved in a costly lawsuit against Decca for copyright infringement on the arrangement of Paula Watson's version of "A Little Bird Told Me", with their version by Evelyn Knight. The judge ruled in favor of Decca, stating that arrangements on an existing composition cannot be considered as property. He also stated that the arrangement on Watson's version lacked originality and the differences between the versions were evident.

In another lawsuit, Supreme lost its pressing and distribution partner Black & White Records, after settling a dispute over Black & White selling it's pressing line to Monogram in Canada.

== Closing ==
Due to the financial duress from the lawsuits, Supreme shut down in 1950. Most of the masters were sold to Swing Time Records. "Two Years of Torture" b/w "Half Awoke", recorded by Percy Mayfield was also re-released by John Dolphin's label, Recorded In Hollywood.

== All known recordings for the Supreme label ==
- AP101 (1947) Bobby Pittman- Don't Mention Love To Me // Deep In A Dream
- AP102 (1947) Bobby Pittman- I Had To Give You Up // If I Had You
- AP103 (1947) Vic Dickenson & His Sextet- St. Louis Blues // You Made Me Love You
- AP104 (1947) Vic Dickenson & His Sextet- You Are Driving Me Crazy // O'Hara's Here
- AP105 (1947) Louis Speiginer's Orchestra- Wandering Gal Blues // Hey Mr. Landlord (Landlord Shuffle)
- AP106 (1947) Louis Speiginer's Orchestra- Cain River Blues // How I Hate To See Xmas Come Around (Christmas Blues)
- AP108 (1947) Jay McShann's Orchestra- Bullie Woogie // Money Getting Cheaper
- AP114 (1948) Dusty Brooks & His Four Tones- Don't Say Cupid Was Foolin' // Motel Time
- AP115 (1948) Dusty Brooks & His Four Tones- (You Can Stay But) That Jive's Got To Go // Dedicated To You
- AP122 (1948) Buddy Tate Orchestra- Why Do The Mission Bells Ring // (That's) My Big Thrill
- AP132 (1948) Vic Dickenson & His Sextet- Run And Hide // Vic's Boogie
- 1500 (1948) Jimmy Witherspoon- Cain River Blues [reissue] // Wandering Gal Blues [reissue]
- 1501 (1948) Jimmy Witherspoon- Money Getting Cheaper (Times Gettin' Tougher Than Tough) [reissue] // Jay McShann Orchestra with Louis Speiginer- Louie's Guitar Boogie (Jumpin' With Louis)
- 1502 (1948) Buddy Tate Orchestra- Tate's A-Jumpin' // Fairweather Friend Blues
- 1503 (1948) Eddie Fullylove- Why Do The Mission Bells Ring [reissue] // (That's) My Big Thrill [reissue]
- 1504 (1948) Buddy Tate Orchestra- Blowin' For Snake // Good Morning Judge
- 1505 (1948) Jimmy Witherspoon- Frogomore Blues (Frog-I-More Blues) // Wee Baby Blues (Early Morning Blues)
- 1506 (1947) Jimmy Witherspoon- Ain't Nobody's Business (Part 1) // Ain't Nobody's Business (Part 2)
- 1507 (1948) Paula Watson- Stick By Me Baby [later issue: Pretty Papa Blues (Pretty Mama Blues)] // A Little Bird Told Me
- 1508 (1948) Jimmy Witherspoon- How I Hate To See Xmas Come Around (Christmas Blues) [reissue] // Hey Mr. Landlord (Landlord Shuffle) [reissue]
- 1509 (1948) Big Jim Wynn & His Orchestra- Blow Wynn Blow // J.W. Bop
- 1510 (1949) Paula Watson- Stick By Me Baby [reissue] [later issue: Pretty Papa Blues (Pretty Mama Blues)] [reissue] // Paula's Nightmare
- 1511 (1949) The Stars of Harmony (Leo Manley-director)- Rough And Rocky Road // Stand By Me
- 1512 (1949) Paula Watson- You Broke Your Promise // I've Got The Sweetest Ma
- 1513 (1949) Dick Peirce Orchestra- An Old Piano Plays The Blues // Peirce Arrow
- 1514 (1949) Buddy Tate Orchestra- Dear Mary // Swingin' Away With Willie And Ray
- 1515 (1949) Terry Lee with Supreme Studio Orchestra- After My Laughter Came Tears // I'm Crazy 'Bout That Guy
- 1516 (1949) The Sensations- Don't Call Me Sweetheart // I'll Never Fall In Love Again
- 1517 (1949) Billy O'Connor & His Quintet- If She Can Cook Like She Can Love // I'll Never Let You Go
- 1518 (1949) Paula Watson- Of All Things // Hidin' In The Sticks
- 1519 (1949) Terry Lee with Supreme Studio Orchestra- Just You And Me // Morning Glow
- 1520 (1949) Jimmy Witherspoon- Back Water Blues // Third Floor Blues
- 1521 (1949) The Stars of Harmony (Leo Manley-director)- My Time's Done Come // Today
- 1522 (1949) Big Jim Wynn & His Band- Goofin' Off // Farewell Baby
- 1523 (1949) Red Saunders Band- Synthesis // Trust In Me (vocal: George Floyd)
- 1524 (1949) Vic Dickenson & His Sextet- Vic's Boogie [reissue] // (What Have You Done With) The Key To My Heart
- 1525 (1949) Dusty Brooks with Bobby Pittman- Please Don't Tell Me We're Through // Dusty Brooks & His Four Tones- (You Can Stay But) That Jive's Got To Go [reissue]
- 1526 (1949) Dick Peirce Orchestra- Immediately If Not Sooner // My Lover
- 1527 (1949) Earl Jackson Orchestra with Johnny Otis- If I Had One // Take Out The Squeal (If You Want A Meal)
- 1528 (1949) Eddie Williams & His Brown Buddies with Floyd Dixon- Houston Jump // Blues In Cuba
- 1530 (1949) C.L. Burke & His Singing Rangers- Promised Land // Travelin' (A Poor Boy Going Home)
- 1531 (1949) George Floyd with Fletcher Henderson Orchestra- Again // Close Your Eyes
- 1532 (1949) Earl Jackson Orchestra with Johnny Otis- So Help Me // Woman Don't Want A Good Man No More
- 1533 (1949) Jimmy Witherspoon- In The Evening (When The Sun Goes Down) // Six-Foot-Two Blues
- 1534 (1949) George Floyd with Fletcher Henderson Orchestra- This Is Everything I Prayed For // Ain't I Losing You
- 1535 (1949) Eddie Williams & His Brown Buddies with Floyd Dixon- Red Head 'N Cadillac // Broken Hearted Blues
- 1536 (1949) Bruce Hudson Orchestra- When You Are Near // A Dream From Me To You
- 1537 (1949) Earl Jackson Orchestra with Johnny Otis- Talking To Myself // Kansas City Jumps
- 1538 (1949) Dick Peirce Orchestra- Annie's Cousin Fanny // Summer Song
- 1540 (1949) Jay McShann Orchestra- McShann Bounce (Part 1) // McShann Bounce (Part 2)
- 1542 (1949) Eddie Williams & His Brown Buddies with Floyd Dixon- Saturday Night Fish Fry (vocal: Ellis "Slow" Walsh) // Mississippi (Mississippi Blues)
- 1543 (1949) Percy Mayfield with Monroe Tucker Orchestra- Two Years Of Torture // Half Awoke (Baby, You're Still A Square)
- 1544 (1949) Maxwell Davis and Marshal Royal- Don't Worry 'Bout Me // Little White Lies
- 1545 (1949) Jimmy Witherspoon- How Long (How Long Blues) // Skid Row Blues
- 1546 (1949) Eddie Williams & His Brown Buddies with Floyd Dixon- You Need Me Now // Prairie Dog Hole
- 1547 (1950) Eddie Williams & His Brown Buddies with Floyd Dixon- Worries (Worried Blues) // I Saw Stars
- 1548 (1950) Eddie Williams & His Brown Buddies with Floyd Dixon- The Umbrella Song // Johnny Katherine
- 1549 (1950) Percy Mayfield with Monroe Tucker Orchestra- How Wrong Can I Be (How Wrong Can A Good Man Be) // Leary Blues
