= Larry Newton =

American music industry executive

- Born: Louis I. Nutinsky; May 7, 1920; Philadelphia, Pennsylvania, US
- Died: January 30, 2005 (aged 84); Pompano Beach, Florida, US
- Occupation(s): Record producer, record executive, entrepreneur
- Years active: 1938–1973
- Known for: Being sales manager, and, later, president, of ABC-Paramount Records
- Spouse: Dorothy Liberman (m. 1940–2005)

Larry Newton (né Louis I. Nutinsky May 7, 1920 – January 30, 2005) was an American record company entrepreneur who, earlier in his career, worked with several independent labels. He then became sales manager at the 1955 startup of ABC-Paramount Records, ascending to president in 1965. He oversaw what became a major multimarket, multi-label company, which, for its jazz subsidiary Impulse!, included Ray Charles, Oliver Nelson, Archie Shepp, Pharoah Sanders, and John Coltrane.

== Career ==
Newton's career began in 1938, while still in high school, when he worked in the stockroom of a Columbia distributor in Philadelphia. He became a salesman for Varsity, Combo, and Rainbow Records

Newton enlisted in the U.S. Army in December 1941. He served as a paratrooper during World War II and was honorably discharged November 15, 1945. In 1946, he became sales manager for Black & White Records.

In March 1949, Newton left B&W to become general manager of Peak Records. Also, around July 1949, Newton co-founded, co-owned, and co-managed, with Eddie Heller, (Note: Eddie Heller founded Rainbow Records in New York City in 1947 and ran it until 1957, when he switched to RCA Victor as Musical Director, a post he held until January 1959; his brother, Bobby Heller, joined Rainbow in 1950 as Promotion Manager; in February 1959, Eddie Heller became Musical Director of MGM Records; Eddie and Bobby also owned a club in north Philadelphia; Eddie died of a heart attack while, among other things, arranging a tour for Rudy Lynn, a celebrity hairstylist who, in 1964, quit to record his first song, "Number One Guy," for Heller's new label, Tribute Records ("Stylist and Confidant to the Stars Rudy Lynn," by Karen Ford, American Salon, April 24, 2015)) Derby Records — which produced hit by the Eddie Wilcox Orchestra, with Sunny Gale (Note: Sunny Gale (née Selma Sega; born 20 February 1927 Clayton, New Jersey) was a pop singer who flourished in the 1950s; "Wheel Of Fortune," released by Derby, was her first recording; it became her first Top 20 hit in 1952 and remains her best-known single) singing "Wheel of Fortune" – and Jaye P. Morgan.

Newton overextended financially and, in 1953, formed a record Central Records with Lee Magid 1953. Eventually, in 1954, he had to file for bankruptcy. The Derby masters were sold to RCA where Newton became an executive.

In 1955, Newton became General Manager of Murray Katz's Treat Records, then located at 236 West 55 Street in Manhattan. In 1956, he joined ABC-Paramount as sales manager where, in 1959, he rose to vice president of sales and, in 1965, president.

1967 saw Newton's most infamous decision: his refusal to promote Louis Armstrong's recording of the song "What a Wonderful World" at Bill Porter's United Recording studio in Las Vegas. The song had been written with Armstrong in mind, but when Armstrong, who had recently signed with ABC Records, was recording it, Newton tried to stop the session, because he disliked the slow pace. Newton was physically locked out of the studio, and the session continued with him fuming outside. During the session, the whistles of passing Union Pacific freight trains, which prompted Armstrong and the musicians to work overtime following a late night concert at the Tropicana resort in Las Vegas, also contributed to the slow production of the single. After its recording, Newton put no promotion effort into the single, calling it a mistake. As a result of Newton's attitude, "What a Wonderful World" did not do well in the U.S., though it succeeded elsewhere in the world, including hitting #1 in the UK. It remained essentially unknown in the United States until 20 years later, when it gained popularity after being used in the 1987 film Good Morning, Vietnam.

In 1970, Newton became vice-president of ABC Pictures. In 1972, he returned to the record business by co-founding and heading GSF Records.

== Death ==
Sometime in the 1940s, Newton married Dorothy Liberman (aka "Dolly;" 1921–2014). He died on January 30, 2005, in Pompano Beach, Florida. He was 84 years old. Larry and his wife are both buried at Star of David Memorial Gardens, North Lauderdale, Florida.
