= The Armed Forces Hour =

- Country of origin: United States

Production
- Running time: 24 mins.

Original release
- Network: NBC (1949-1950); DuMont (1951)
- Release: October 30, 1949 – May 6, 1951

The Armed Forces Hour is an American television program broadcast on NBC October 30, 1949 - June 11, 1950 and on the DuMont Television Network February 4, 1951 - May 6, 1951. Despite the title of the series, it was a half-hour program.

== NBC version ==
The program's purpose was to demonstrate that unification of American armed forces had brought about "increased efficiency and economy". The Armed Forces Hour was one of four TV series on the air in 1950 that resulted from creation of a single radio and television department for the American military with Charles E. Dillon heading the unit.

=== Production ===
The Armed Forces Hour was "culled from the estimated 500 million feet of film" archived at the U.S. Department of Defense. Production was supervised by Major Robert Keim and Lieutenant Benjamin Greenberg. The program originated in NBC's studios in the Wardman Park Hotel in Washington with segments coming from military bases and field activities of military units. The Concert Orchestra and Singing Sergeants of the Air Force Band provided background music. Major Bob Keim and Navy Lieutenant Ben Greenberg were co-producers. The program was broadcast at 5 p.m. Eastern Time on Sundays.

=== Episodes ===
Episodes of the program included:

- October 30, 1949 - "Your Defense Dollar"
- November 6, 1949 - "Medicine in the Armed Forces"
- November 13, 1949 - "Amphibious Warfare"
- November 20, 1949 - "Service Academies"
- December 4, 1949 - "Music in the Air"
- December 11, 1949 - "Joint Chiefs of Staff"
- December 18, 1949 - "Geronimo"
- December 25, 1949 - "Sky Pilot"
- January 1, 1950 - "Defense Diary"

=== Critical response ===
A review of the premiere episode in the trade publication Billboard found it "quite satisfactory" in documenting how defense money was spent but "somewhat less successful" in reducing viewers' pain of paying taxes. The review commended use of a pie chart in conjunction with film that showed related military activity when each segment of the chart was discussed. Overall, the review said the episode was "much too talky", with some participants hesitant or uncertain while others were "just plain dull".

== DuMont version ==
After a one-season run on NBC, the network cancelled the series in 1950. However, on February 4, 1951, the series started again on the DuMont Television Network, with the last DuMont episode airing on May 6, 1951. This version emphasized entertainment by "using a musical variety format to lure viewers to watch short films about the services."

Episodes using a set resembling a USO club featured The Singing Sergeants, the U. S. Navy Dance Band and other performers from the military. Guest professional performers included Frances Langford and Marion Morgan. Films about the military completed each episode.

The show was broadcast from 8 to 9 p.m. Eastern Time on Sundays.

== See also ==
- List of programs broadcast by the DuMont Television Network
- List of surviving DuMont Television Network broadcasts
- The Army Hour

== Bibliography ==
- David Weinstein, The Forgotten Network: DuMont and the Birth of American Television (Philadelphia: Temple University Press, 2004) ISBN 1-59213-245-6
