= Swing Time Records =

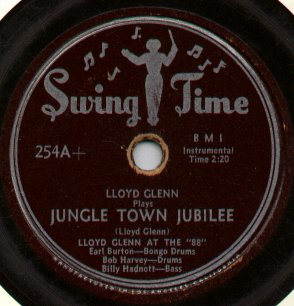
- Founded: 1947
- Founder: Jack Lauderdale
- Defunct: 1954
- Genre: Jazz, rhythm and blues
- Country of origin: U.S.
- Location: Los Angeles, California

Swing Time Records was a United States–based record label active in the late 1940s and early 1950s. The label was founded by Jack Lauderdale in 1947 as Down Beat Records and was headquartered in Los Angeles, California. In approximately October 1949 the name was changed to Swing Beat Records, and around March 1950 the name was changed again to Swing Time. The company went bankrupt in 1953 but continued releasing singles as late as February 1954.

Ray Charles, Percy Mayfield, Lowell Fulson, and other rhythm and blues and swing era artists of the 1940s first recorded for this company. It is possible to find certain releases on more than one label name.

== Leasing, purchasing, reissuing, signings ==
Lauderdale started his label by recording the Lucky Thompson Quartet with Dodo Marmarosa in late 1946 (releasing three discs during 1947). Felix Gross & His Sextet were another early signing (releasing eight discs during 1947 through 1949). He then leased/reissued recordings by the Five Soul Stirrers from Bronze Records (releasing three discs in 1947). Next up was the leasing/reissuing of Lowell Fulson's recordings for Bob Geddins' Big Town/Down Town/Cava-Tone group of labels and the Bob Geddins/Rene LaMarre-partnered Trilon label (a total of 12 discs were released starting in 1947 through 1949). Jack also got masters of Jimmy McCracklin & His Blues Blasters from Trilon.

In 1950 Lauderdale purchased all the master recordings by the Charles Brown-led Johnny Moore's Three Blazers from Leon René's Exclusive Records, plus the masters by Brown's ex-wife, Mabel Scott. Lauderdale purchased Al Patrick's defunct Supreme Records label and reissued recordings by Jimmy Witherspoon with Jay McShann's band (featuring Louis Speiginer on guitar), Paula Watson, Percy Mayfield, Floyd Dixon with bass player Eddie Williams' trio (The Brown Buddies), Sister Emily Bram, the Stars of Harmony gospel group, and Maxwell Davis' band with Marshal Royal starting in late 1950 through 1951.

Added to all this activity was the signing of pianist Lloyd Glenn as recording artist/house band leader/session arranger and label A&R man. Also signed-up were Pete Johnson's band with Big Joe Turner, and the Maxin/Maxim Trio with Ray Charles. Dexter Gordon's quintet with Wardell Gray recorded a session (releasing two discs), and songwriter/bass player Shifty Henry recorded for the Swing Time label (one disc released in 1950). Two late signings were Play Boy Thomas (two discs recorded/released in 1953), and the Hollywood Flames featuring Bobby Byrd (one disc in 1954).

Several Swing Time recordings (i.e. all the holiday singles) were given permanent lease to Hollywood Records.

== Numbering system ==
The Down Beat/Swing Beat/Swing Time Records numbering system ran from No. 100 (1947) through No. 347 (1954). Lauderdale also started up a subsidiary label in late 1952: his Flame Records numbering system ran from No. 1001 through No. 1009.

== See also ==
- List of record labels
