= Felix Gross =

Felix Gross may refer to:

- Feliks Gross (1906–2006), Polish-American sociologist
- Felix Groß (born 1998), German cyclist
- Felix Gross (musician), American musician and composer
