= Marion Morgan =

Marion Morgan may refer to:

- Marion Morgan (singer)
- Marion Morgan (choreographer)
