= Buttons and Bows =

1947 song by Jay Livingston and Ray Evans

Single by Dinah Shore and her Happy Valley Boys
- B-side: "Daddy-O"
- Published: February 25, 1948 by Famous Music Corp., New York
- Released: August 16, 1948
- Recorded: November 30, 1947
- Genre: Popular music, Pop standard
- Length: 2:01
- Label: Columbia 38284
- Songwriters: Jay Livingston and Ray Evans

"Buttons and Bows"
Sung by Bing Crosby in The Adventures of Ozzie and Harriet episode "A Visit from Bing Crosby," broadcast December 5, 1948

"Buttons and Bows" is a popular song with music written by Jay Livingston and lyrics by Ray Evans. The song was published on February 25, 1948 by Famous Music Corp., New York. The song was written for and appeared in the Bob Hope and Jane Russell film The Paleface and won the Academy Award for Best Original Song. It was originally written with a Native American theme, but was changed when the director said that would not work in the movie. It was a vocal selection on many radio programs in late 1948. It was reprised in the sequel, Son of Paleface, by Roy Rogers, Jane Russell and Bob Hope. In 2004 it finished number 87 in AFI's 100 Years...100 Songs survey of the top tunes in American cinema.

Though they began writing together in 1937, Livingston and Evans did not hit the top until 1946, when they set the music publishing business on fire with "To Each His Own", which reached number one on the Billboard charts for three different artists, and occupied the top five positions on the "Most Played On the Air" chart for four different weeks. "Buttons and Bows" (1947) was their next multi-million seller, with four artists reaching the top ten in 1948, and won the Academy Award for Best Song. They finished off the decade with 1949's "Mona Lisa", which was a chart hit for seven popular and two country artists in 1950, sold a million for Nat King Cole, and won the pair another Best Song Oscar.

The most popular version of the song was recorded by Dinah Shore on November 30, 1947, but was not released until the following year. It reached the number one spot in November 1948, which it held for ten weeks, into January 1949. It beat out Peggy Lee's "Mañana" (number one for nine weeks) for the number one record of 1948. Charting versions of the song were also recorded by The Dinning Sisters, Betty Rhodes, Evelyn Knight, and Betty Garrett the same year. Gene Autry recorded his version for Columbia in December 1947, reaching number 6 on both the Best Selling Retail Folk Records and the Most Played Juke Box Folk Records charts, and number 17 on the Pop chart.

== Recording and chart history ==
- The Dinah Shore version was recorded on November 30, 1947, and released by Columbia Records as catalog number 38284. The record first reached the Billboard charts on September 17, 1948, and lasted 24 weeks on the chart. It was the biggest hit of her career, selling a minimum of one million units.
- The Dinning Sisters' version was recorded on December 29, 1947, and released by Capitol Records as catalog number 15184. The record first reached the Billboard charts on October 22, 1948, and lasted 16 weeks on the chart, peaking at number seven.
- The Betty Garrett version was recorded on December 29, 1947, and released by MGM Records as catalog number 10244. The record first reached the Billboard charts on November 5, 1948, and lasted two weeks on the chart, peaking at number 27.
- The Betty Rhodes version was released by RCA Victor Records as catalog number 20-3078. The record first reached the Billboard charts on November 12, 1948, and lasted six weeks on the chart, peaking at number 15.
- The Evelyn Knight version was recorded on November 29, 1947, and released by Decca Records as catalog number 24489. The record first reached the Billboard charts on November 12, 1948, and lasted six weeks on the chart, peaking at number 22.
- The Gene Autry version was recorded in December 1947, and released by Columbia Records as catalog number 20469.
- Bob Hope and The Clark Sisters recorded the song on October 14, 1948. It was released on Capitol 15292.
- The Geraldo/Doreen Lundy version was recorded on November 10, 1948, and released by Parlophone Records as catalog number F 2326.
- The Browns' version was released on RCA 7997 in 1962. It entered the Billboard Bubbling Under Hot 100 chart the week of April 7, 1962, where it spent two weeks, peaking at number 104.
- The Connie Francis version was recorded on April 27, 1962, at RCA Italiana Studios in Rome. It was originally intended for inclusion on the album Connie Francis Sings Award Winning Motion Picture Hits on MGM Records E-/SE-4048. However, before the album was released in March 1963, the song was shelved and remained in the vaults unreleased until 1996.
- The Sum Sum 森森 (Hong Kong female singer/artist) versions were recorded in 1971 and 1974. The 1971 version was performed in Mandarin Chinese language with Chinese lyrics written by Szeto Ming (司徒明) and given the title name of 莫奔跑, appearing on her LP album 一寸相思一寸淚 (Bitter Love In Tears), and released by EMI Regal Records as catalog number LRHX-849. For the 1974 version, it was performed in Cantonese language with Chinese lyrics (different from the 1971 one) written by So Yung (蘇翁) and given the title name of 不敢再領教, appearing on her LP album 森森 Sum Sum, and released by EMI Regal Records as catalog number S-LRHX-1002.
- The Ervinna (Singapore-based female singer) With Charlie & His Boys version was recorded between 1972 and 1974, appearing on her LP album Golden Hits Of 20th Century Vol. 4, and released by White Cloud Record of Singapore as issue number EALP-1231.
- The John Inman version was recorded in 1975, appearing on his LP album Are You Being Served Sir?, and released by DJM Records UK catalog number DJLPS 468 and by Festival Records Australia catalog number L 35800.
- The French singer Yvette Giraud version was recorded in the fifties under the French title "Ma guêpière et mes longs jupons".
- Rab Noakes recorded an interpretation on his 2015 album 'I'm Walkin' Here'.

== In other media ==
- Livingston and Evans appeared in Sunset Boulevard (1950) performing the song in a New Year's Eve party scene.
- The haberdashery department is said to perform the song for Mr. Grace's birthday on the episode "Happy Returns" of Are You Being Served?
- The melody to "Buttons and Bows" was used as a character theme in the 1960s TV sitcom F Troop. It was frequently heard over the entrance of "Wrangler Jane", played by Melody Patterson.
- The song makes an appearance in "Look Before You Leap," an episode from the third season of Frasier. He considers the song simplistic, but during a PBS pledge telethon, Frasier Crane (Kelsey Grammer) tries to perform it but forgets nearly all of the lyrics, much to the amusement of his father Martin Crane and his physical therapist, Daphne Moon.
- Gisele MacKenzie sang "Buttons and Bows" on The Jack Benny Program in the episode "Ghost Town: Western Sketch" S12/Ep17 (1962) where she played a saloon singer.
- This song makes an appearance in the American Horror Story: Asylum episode "Tricks and Treats", in a scene set in 1949 where a character hits a small girl with a car while driving intoxicated.
- The song is sung by the characters in Distant Voices, Still Lives (1988).
- In the episode of Hope's radio show that aired on December 7, 1948, guest Bing Crosby contends that, if he had known Beethoven, the composer would have written songs for him. There follows a sketch in which Hope plays Beethoven, and Crosby plays "Herr Bingle von Crosbein", both with comical German accents. The pair perform a parody song set to the tune of "Buttons and Bows", called "Heinie's and Moe's", about a delicatessen.
- A portion of the song is played in The Brutalist (2024) during a dancing scene.
- The song is available on the Nichols Omni Music Box for ice cream trucks.

== See also ==
- List of number-one singles of 1948 (U.S.)
- List of number-one singles of 1949 (U.S.)
