= Ralph Bass =

R&B record producer

- Born: Ralph Basso, Jr. May 1, 1911; The Bronx, New York City, U.S.
- Died: March 5, 1997 (aged 85) New York City, U.S.
- Genres: Jazz, R&B
- Occupations: Record producer A&R scout
- Years active: 1941–1997
- Labels: Black and White; Savoy; King; Chess; MCA

Ralph Basso Jr. (May 1, 1911 – March 5, 1997), known as Ralph Bass, (Note: The birth surname of Ralph Bass's paternal grandfather, who was born in Italy, was DuBasso.) was an American rhythm-and-blues record producer and talent scout for several independent labels. He was a pioneer in bringing African American music into the American mainstream. During his career he worked in key roles for Black & White Records, Savoy Records, King Records, Federal Records, and Chess Records, recording many leading performers, including Etta James, Sam Cooke, James Brown, Earl Bostic, and groups such as the Platters and the Dominoes. Bass was inducted into the Rock and Roll Hall of Fame in 1991 as a nonperformer.

== Personal life ==
Bass was born in the Bronx to an Italian Catholic father, Ralph Bass, né Basso, and a German-American Jewish mother, Lena, née Brettner, who raised all of their children within a kosher household in the religious faith of Judaism. As a young boy, Ralph displayed a gift for music and his mother enrolled him in lessons, for which he became an accomplished classical violinist. However, raised within a diverse enclave in the Bronx, Ralph was exposed to a number of cultural nuances which influenced his choice of musical genres from classical to Blues and Jazz. From an early age, Bass wanted to not simply perform, but assemble sounds that he enjoyed listening to. After his marriage to his first wife, Alice née Robbins, Bass found opportunities in Los Angeles and relocated with his young family, including his two sons, Michael and Dennis. During Ralph's venture into the record industry he began to travel to the Mississippi Delta and other southern states where he heard some of the best music was being played. It was there he discovered a source of unrecorded musicians and his niche as a record producer and talent scout. Here-to-fore Jim Crow laws kept African American performers marginalized, with many relegated to one-night stands performing only to all-black audiences in a network of theaters and nightclubs known as the Chitlin' Circuit. After his second marriage to Shirley Hall Bass on December 17, 1960 Bass decided to focus his career on bringing African American music and African American performers into the entertainment mainstream.

== Career ==
Bass became an A&R man in the 1940s at Black & White Records, where he produced and recorded, among others, Lena Horne, Roosevelt Sykes, Jack McVea (Bass suggested he record "Open the Door, Richard", which became a hit) and T-Bone Walker (including Walker's landmark "Call It Stormy Monday"). From there he went on to help build two of the most successful independent record labels, Savoy Records, in New Jersey, and King Records, in Cincinnati, Ohio. During this period, Bass toured the South with various blues bands and noted the large size of the audiences, still predominantly black but with an increasing numbers of whites. He sensed that the audience was changing.

At Savoy from 1948 to 1951, he recorded Brownie McGhee and Johnny Otis. At Federal Records, a subsidiary of King run by Bass, he turned out a series of R&B hits, including the Dominoes' "Sixty Minute Man" and "Have Mercy Baby" and Hank Ballard's "Work with Me, Annie". King's founder, Syd Nathan, at first refused to sign James Brown to record "Please, Please, Please", because he thought poorly of the demo; Bass signed Brown to Federal and produced "Please, Please, Please", the first Federal single, which was a regional hit and eventually sold a million copies. Bass also produced the original version of the R&B standard "Kansas City", recorded by Little Willie Littlefield. Bass 'discovered' John Lee, who had two country blues singles released by Federal in 1952.

Ralph Bass knew the repertoire; he'd heard more gravel-voiced shouters, high-pitched keeners, hopped-up rockers, churchy belters, burlesque barkers, doo-wop crooners, and sweet, soft moaners—more lovers, leavers, losers, loners, lady-killers, lambasters, lounge lizards, lemme-show-you men, and lawdy-be boys—than any dozen jukeboxes could contain. But he had never heard a voice that possessed the essence of all these styles while moving beyond them toward a sound at once more feral and more self-assured, until he heard "Please, Please, Please".

— Philip Gourevitch, The New Yorker, 2002

"Please, Please, Please," James Brown, Federal Records on YouTube

In 1959, the Chess brothers hired Bass away from King to serve as A&R director for Chess Records. He worked for Chess until 1976, producing recordings by blues, gospel, R&B, and rock-and-roll artists, including Clara Ward, the Soul Stirrers, Etta James, Howlin' Wolf, Muddy Waters, and Sonny Boy Williamson. He composed the music for Pigmeat Markham's hit novelty single "Here Comes the Judge". Later, for MCA Records, he produced recordings by John Lee Hooker.

"Please, Please, Please," James Brown, Federal Records

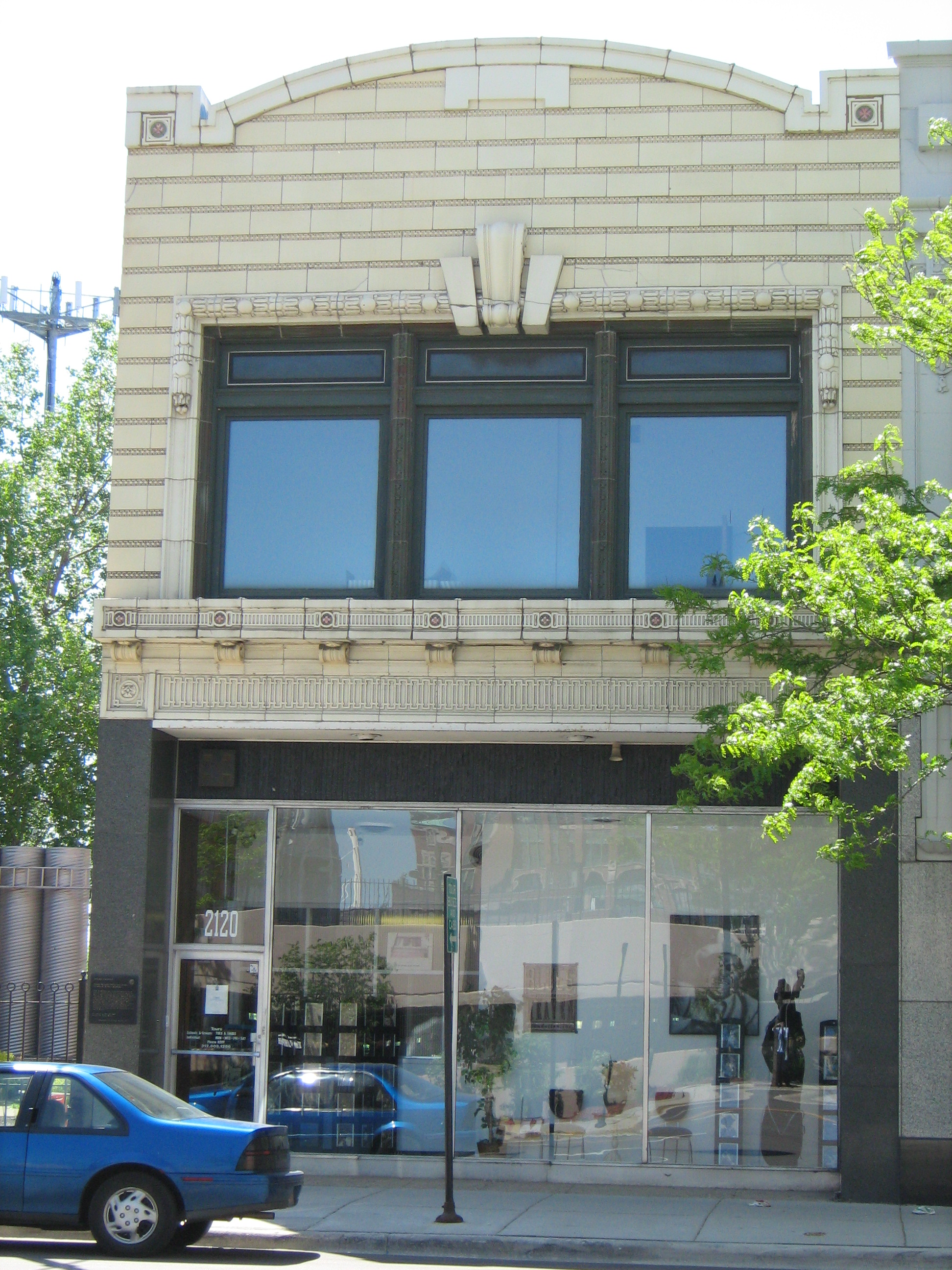
Chess Records Studio, Chicago

== Filmography ==
In the 2014 film Get On Up, a biography of James Brown produced by Bryan Grazer and Mick Jagger, Bass is portrayed by Josh Hopkins.

== Audio/visual ==
"Ralph Bass, First Recording," told by Ralph Bass on YouTube
