= Nat Jaffe =

- Born: January 1, 1918; New York City, U.S.
- Died: August 5, 1945 (aged 27) New York City, U.S.
- Genre: Swing jazz
- Instrument: Piano
- Years active: 1938 – 1945
- Labels: Onxy Records; Savoy Records; Varsity Records; Signature Records; Black and White Records
- Formerly of: Louis Armstrong, Charlie Barnet, Jack Teagarden, Sarah Vaughn

Nat Jaffe (January 1, 1918 – August 5, 1945) was an American swing jazz pianist. He was married to singer Shirley Lloyd.

Jaffe lived in Berlin from 1921 to 1932, where he received classical training on piano. Upon his return to the U.S., he began playing jazz music, working with Noel Francis, the Emery Deutsch Orchestra, and as a soloist on 52nd Street. In the late 1930s he played with Jan Savitt, Joe Marsala and Billie Holiday, and recorded with Louis Armstrong (1938), Charlie Barnet (1938–39) and Jack Teagarden (1940). He led his own trio in the early 1940s and recorded in 1945 with Sarah Vaughan.

Jaffe died in 1945 as a result of complications from high blood pressure at the age of 27.

== Recordings ==
=== Solo (1938) ===
Three solo piano pieces (Body And Soul, Liza and I Can't Get Started) were recorded on January 31, 1938, and released by Onyx Records in 1974 on 52nd Street; Volume 2, which also features performances by Coleman Hawkins, Ben Webster and Don Byas.

=== With Louis Armstrong (1938) ===
The line-up of Louis Armstrong's orchestra during a New York recording session on June 24, 1938, included Nat Jaffe on piano, and produced four tracks:

- Naturally (Natch-ra-ly)
- I've Got a Pocketful of Dreams
- I Can't Give You Anything but Love
- Ain't Misbehavin'

=== With Charlie Barnet (1938-1939) ===
During four recording sessions in New York in 1938 and 1939, Nat Jaffe was part of Charlie Barnet's orchestra. He shared piano credits with Graham Forbes for the 1938 recordings. They recorded the following songs:

==== May 16, 1938 ====
- Make Believe Ballroom (Theme)
- Prelude In C Sharp Minor
- I Let A Song Go Out Of My Heart
- You Go To My Head
- Stop, Look And Listen
- Harmony In Harlem
- Blue Turning Grey Over You
- In-A-Jam
- Chatterbox
- Rock It For Me
- Lullaby In Rhythm

==== November 5, 1938 ====
- Prelude To A Kiss
- Jump Jump's Here
- Undecided
- You Got Me

==== January 1939 ====
- I Get Along Without You Very Well
- I'm Prayin' Humble
- Tin Roof Blues
- Knocking At The Famous Door

==== February 24, 1939 ====
- The Gal From Joe's
- Where Can She Be
- Jump Session
- I Wouldn't Give That For Love
- A New Moon and an Old Serenade
- Swing Street Strut

=== With Jack Teagarden (1940) ===
In 1940, Jack Teagarden recorded sixteen sides for Varsity, which were reissued in 1986 by Savoy Jazz. During these sessions, his orchestra included Nat Jaffe on piano.

==== February 19–27 ====
- If I Could Be With You One Hour Tonight
- My Melancholy Baby
- Can't We Talk It Over
- The Blues
- Love For Sale
- You, You Darling
- The Moon And The Willow Tree
- Wham

==== April 14–16 ====
- Devil May Care
- Night On The Shalimar
- I Hear Bluebirds
- Fatima's Drummer Boy

==== Late July ====
- Now I Lay Me Down To Dream
- Wait Til I Catch You In My Dreams
- And So Do I
- River Home

=== Fats Waller Songs (1944) ===
On February 26, 1944, he recorded four of eight sides with Sid Jacobs on bass on a memorial album for Fats Waller, with Earl Hines recording the other four, for Signature Records:

- How Can You Face Me?
- Keepin' Out of Mischief Now
- (What Did I Do To Be So) Black And Blue
- Zonky

=== Nat Jaffe Trio (1944) ===
The Nat Jaffe Trio, with guitarist Remo Palmieri and bassist Leo Guarnieri, made four recordings on December 21, 1944, for Black and White Records:

- Blues In Nat's Flat
- These Foolish Things (Remind Me Of You)
- A Hundred Years From Today
- If I Had You

=== Nat Jaffe and his V-Disc Jumpers (1945) ===
On January 24, 1945, Jaffe recorded at least one track with this group, featuring Don Byas and Flip Phillips on tenor saxophone, Charlie Shavers on trumpet and Specs Powell on drums: The Jeep Is Jumpin'.

=== With Sarah Vaughan (1945) ===
Jaffe played piano on two of three recorded tracks during a recording session on May 25, 1945, in New York:

- What More Can a Woman Do?
- Mean to Me
