= A Little Bird Told Me =

"A Little Bird Told Me" is a popular song. It was written by Harvey Oliver Brooks (1899–1968) and was published in 1947.

== Recordings ==
- The recording by Paula Watson was released by Supreme Records as catalog number 1507. It first reached the Billboard Best Seller chart on November 26, 1948, and lasted eleven weeks on the chart, peaking at number fourteen.
- The recording by Evelyn Knight was released by Decca Records as catalog number 24514. It first reached the Billboard Best Seller chart on November 12, 1948, and lasted 21 weeks on the chart, peaking at number one. This was the bigger side of a two-sided hit; the flip side, "Brush Those Tears from Your Eyes," also charted, reaching number 24.
- The recording by Blue Lu Barker was released by Capitol Records as catalog number 15308. It first reached the Billboard Best Seller chart on December 31, 1948, and lasted five weeks on the chart, peaking at number sixteen.
- The recording by Jerry Wayne and Janette Davis was released by Columbia Records as catalog number 38386. It reached the Billboard Best Seller chart on February 11, 1949, at number 26, its only week on the chart.
- The recording by Joe Loss and His Orchestra Vocal: Elizabeth Batey was made in London on January 25, 1939. It was released by EMI on the His Master's Voice label as catalog number BD 6037.

== Landmark court case ==
In 1950, Supreme Records, Incorporated – a small label owned by Al Patrick (Albert T. Patrick; 1910–1973), who was African American – lost a case in United States District Court for the Central District of California, Southern Division, against Decca Records, Inc., a large record label.

- In 1948, Supreme recorded in Los Angeles and released "A Little Bird Told Me", written by Harvey Oliver Brooks (1899–1968), sung by Paula Watson (1927–2003), who is African American, accompanied by guitarist Mitchell "Tiny" Webb, and others. Her version enjoyed a fourteen-week run on the Billboard R&B chart in 1948 and 1949, reaching number 2 on the R&B charts and number 6 on the pop charts.

- In 1948, Decca Records, recorded in New York and released a cover version, sung by Evelyn Knight (1917–2007), who is Caucasian. Knight copied Watson's singing, precisely – to the degree that it fooled musical experts brought into court as witnesses. Knight was accompanied by a band that included Walter Page on bass, the Stardusters (vocal group), and Johnny Parker (vocal and hand-clapping).

Supreme claimed that Decca had stolen aspects of its original recording, including its arrangement, texture, and vocal style. Race was not an issue in the case, but the case served as a notorious example of white performers covering the work of black artists in the 1950s.

The Court ruled in favor of the defense – upholding a ruling that musical arrangements are not copyrightable property – individual interpretations or arrangements of a given style could not be protested under the law. This case opened the door for cover versions.

Black & White Record Distributors, Inc., had been one of the two original plaintiffs, but withdrew on a motion by the defendant, leaving Supreme as the sole plaintiff. Black & White participated in the case because it had been the manufacturer and distributor of Supreme's line. Separately from the "Little Bird" case, Supreme had sued Black & White, contending that B&W had no right to turn over its line to two Canadian firms, Monogram and Dominion, who had been pressing and distributing in Canada. On April 2, 1949, Supreme and B&W settled their dispute, out of court.

Supreme was soon entirely out of business, and by December 1949, Paula Watson was working for Decca.

== See also ==
- List of number-one singles of 1949 (U.S.)

== Bibliography ==
=== References ===
- Arwulf, Arwulf [in Finnish] (2004). "Paula Watson, 1948–1953". AllMusic (album review ID: mw0000266373). TiVo Corporation. CD album release date: October 19, 2004, by Chronological Classics 5104.
- Gilliland, John (197X). "Pop Chronicles 1940s Program #22 All Tracks". UNT Digital Library. Denton: University of North Texas Libraries.
- Legal Case (May 5, 1950). "Supreme Records v. Decca Records". Justia (U.S. District Court for the Southern District of California, 90 F. Supp. 904).
- Randall, Annie Janeiro (2009). Dusty, Queen of the Postmods. Oxford University Press. p. 175 (endnote 32). ISBN 978-0-19-532943-8 – via Internet Archive. LCCN 2008-14447, ISBN 978-0-1997-1630-2, 0-1997-1630-7, OCLC 308582637 (all editions).
- "Supreme, B&W Bury Hatchet Out of Court". Billboard. Vol. 61, no. 15. April 9, 1949. p. 19 – via Google Books.
- Whitburn, Joel C. (1973). Top Pop Singles 1940–1955. Menomonee Falls, Wisconsin: Record Research, Inc. pp. 47 (Watson), 31 (Knight), 10 (Barker), 47 (Wayne). LCCN 89656133. OCLC 65989072 – via Internet Archive.
- Zak, Albin Joseph III (2010). "[Chapter] Five – Surface Noise". I Don't Sound Like Nobody: Remaking Music in 1950s America. Ann Arbor: University of Michigan Press. p. 143. (Chapter Five explains the legal precedent set by the lawsuit between Decca and Supreme over Paula Watson's and Evelyn Knight's recordings of "A Little Bird Told Me") LCCN 2010-14120, ISBN 978-0-4721-1637-9, 0-4721-1637-1, ISBN 978-0-4720-2454-4, 0-4720-2454-X, OCLC 943428414, 1250063139, 940644509.
