= Gene Phillips (guitarist) =

American musician (1915–1990)

Eugene Floyd Phillips (May 25, 1915 – January 10, 1990) was an American jump blues guitarist and singer.

== Career ==
He was born in St. Louis, Missouri, and took up the ukulele and later the guitar as a child. He also sang, influenced by, and a fan of, Big Joe Turner, Jimmy Rushing, Louis Jordan, and Wynonie Harris. He joined the St Louis bands of Dewey Jackson and Jimmy Powell and was later taught lap steel guitar by Floyd Smith. He later went on to join Lorenzo Flennoy's Trio. A pioneer of the lap steel guitar, he recorded with the Ink Spots and the Mills Brothers, among others. In late 1945 he recorded with Lucky Thompson in a band also featuring Marshal Royal and Charles Mingus.

His Rhythm Aces, the band he used on his Modern recordings for the Bihari Brothers, included Jake Porter, trumpet; Marshal Royal, alto sax; Maxwell Davis, tenor sax; Jack McVea, tenor sax; Bumps Meyers, tenor sax; Lloyd Glenn, piano; Willard McDaniel, piano; Al "Cake" Wichard, drums; William "Bill" Street, drums; and Art Edwards, bass. His repertoire included "I Could Make You Love Me", "Big Fat Mama", "Big Legs", "Fatso", "Punkin' Head Woman", "Stinkin' Drunk", and "Women, Women, Women".

Phillips died in Lakewood, California, in 1990.

== Selected discography ==
- Gene Phillips and the Rockers (Crown CLP 5375, 1963)
- Gene Phillips and His Rhythm Aces (Ace CHD 169, 1986)
- I Like 'Em Fat (Ace CHD 245, 1988)
- Swinging the Blues (Ace CDCHD 746, 2000)
- Drinkin' and Stinkin' (Ace CDCHM 894, 2003)
