= Powder Your Face with Sunshine =

"Powder Your Face with Sunshine" is a popular song written by Carmen Lombardo and Stanley Rochinski, and published in 1948. Rochinski wrote the lyrics for "Powder Your Face with Sunshine" while hospitalized due to spinal injuries incurred during World War II. Subsequently, he brought the lyrics to Lombardo who set it to music.

The two biggest hit versions of the song were recorded by Evelyn Knight and by the Sammy Kaye Orchestra.

== Original recordings ==
The recording by Evelyn Knight was recorded on November 16, 1948, and released by Decca Records as catalog number 24530. It first reached the Billboard Best Seller chart on December 17, 1948, and lasted 17 weeks on the chart, peaking at number one.

The recording by Sammy Kaye was recorded in December 1948, and released by RCA Victor Records as catalog number 20-3321 (78 rpm) and 47-2901 (45 rpm). It first reached the Billboard Best Seller chart on January 28, 1949, and lasted eight weeks on the chart, peaking at number 14.

== Cover versions ==
Other recordings made about the same time:

- Dean Martin (on December 17, 1948, released by Capitol Records as catalog number 15351)
- Doris Day and Buddy Clark, with George Siravo's orchestra (on December 20, 1948, released by Columbia Records as catalog number 38394)
- Blue Barron and his orchestra (on December 21, 1948, released by MGM Records as catalog number 10346).
- Donald Peers, with Peter Yorke's orchestra (on March 26, 1949, released by EMI on the His Master's Voice label as catalog number B 9764).
- Joe Loss and His Orchestra (in London on April 1, 1949, released by EMI on the His Master's Voice label as catalog numbers BD 6043 and HE 2703).

== Subsequent covers ==
- Steve Rochinski, for his album A Bird In The Hand (1999)
