= Treat Records =

R&B and pop record label

Treat Records was an American record label founded in March 1955 by Murray Katz. It was based in New York City at 236 West 55th Street. Larry Newton, formerly of Derby Records, was the general manager. The label produced R&B and pop records. The label folded later in 1955, but all of its recordings have been re-released.

== Artists ==
Treat had 8 releases, each on both 45 and 78 rpm. The initial artists under contract with the label were:

Artists	Notes
Terri Lee	Female vocalist
The Five; Diamonds	
The; Inspirators	The Inspirators on Treat Records and Old Town are the same group as The Five Stars: (i) Cleo Perry (1936–1993) (Note: Cleo Ricardo Perry, born 31 Aug 1936 Kings County, New York, died 4 February 1993) (lead), (ii) William Massey (1st Tenor), (iii) Clifton Johnson (2nd Tenor), (iv) Barney Fields (baritone), and (v) Buster Boyce (bass); Over the years, the Inspirators recorded several other songs for Treat, none of which were ever released. In 1958, while still under contract to Newton, the Inspirators became part of a deal that Newton made with Hy Weiss, under which two songs were recorded for Old Town, "Starlight Tonight" (Note: Old Town 1053: The Inspirators Released June 1958 901: "Starlight Tonight" (© 1958) (audio on YouTube) Cleo Perry (w&m) Sam Weiss (w&m) BMI: Twin Music Corp. (Twin Music, Inc.) 902: "Oh What a Feeling" ("In My Heart") (© 1958) (audio on YouTube) Cleo Perry (w&m) John Hill (w&m) John Richborg (w&m) BMI: Twin Music Corp. (Twin Music, Inc.)) and "Oh What a Feeling." Both were released June 1958. As was the case with their recordings with Treat, the two singles didn't amount to much in terms of sales. Around that time, the group began to disintegrate. "There were personal problems with drinking and women," according to Cleo Perry, and Perry decided to go out on his own
Sonny Benton	
Hen Gates; Combo	The Hen Gates recordings were actually 1940s Freddie Mitchell (1922–1995) masters from the Derby label, and all the songs were renamed. There never was a "Hen Gates." The pseudonym was also used for Jimmy Foreman, Dizzy Gillespie, and Charlie Parker.
Blind Boy; Fuller	Pseudonym for Brownie McGhee (blues singer)
The; Five Stars	A male quintet, that, essentially for Treat and Old Town, were The Inspirators; the members — all from the Bedford-Stuyvesant section of Brooklyn — were (i) Cleo Perry (1936–1993) (lead), (ii) William Massey (1st tenor), (iii) Clifton Johnson (2nd tenor), (iv) Barry Fields (baritone), and (v) Buster Boyce (bass); this group was not to be confused with The Five Stars of Detroit (mid-1958), which consisted of (a) Joseph Murphy, (b) John Raymond Dorsey, (c) Walter Gaines, (d) Crathman C.P. Spencer, and (e) Henry Jones

== Extant discography ==
Original releases

1. Treat (no catalog number)
  The Five Diamonds
  With the Hen Gates Orchestra
  T-9: "The Night"
  (audio on YouTube)
  By L. Griffin & Lloyd
  BMI: Alan Music
  T-10: "My Love"
  (audio on YouTube)
  L. Griffin (w&m)
  BMI: Alan Music
2. Treat 501
  Five Diamonds
  Released 1954
  T-11: "The Ten Commandments of Love"
  (audio on YouTube)
  L. Griffin (w&m)
  BMI: Alan Music
  OCLC 80207669
  "I Cried and Cried"
  (audio on YouTube)
  By L. Griffin & Lloyd
  BMI: Alan Music
3. Treat 502
  The Inspirators
  With Orchestra
  Released April 1955
  T-3: "Three Sixty"
  (audio on YouTube)
  Alton Earl Collier (w&m)
  BMI: Allan Music
  T-4: "If Loving You Is Wrong" (© 1955)
  (audio on YouTube)
  Alton Earl Collier (w&m)
  Barnhill Music Corp. (Note: Barnhill Music Corp. was formed by Dave Dreyer in 1950 to serve what then was an emerging hillbilly market)
  BMI: Allan Music
  OCLC 84380325
4. Treat 503
  Hen Gates
  And Orchestra
  Released 1955
  T-21: "Flash"
  T-13: "Loose"
  (audio on YouTube)
  By H. Gates
  BMI: Allan Music
5. Treat 504
  Terri Lee with the
  Reg Ashby Orchestra (Note: Reg Ashby (né Reginald Theodore Ashby; 1921–2002) was born in Brooklyn and, around 1938, graduated from the Brooklyn Automotive High School, having played in its dance band; from about 1947 to 1955 he was the pianist for Doc Pomus; he was also the pianist on Pete Brown's 1959 album, From the Heart (A Rocket in My Pocket: The Hipster's Guide to Rockabilly Music, by Max Décharné, Serpent's Tail, 2010, pg. 194; OCLC 440186937))
  T-25: "My, My, My" (© 1955)
  (audio on YouTube)
  Willis Carroll (w&m)
  Carmen Taylor (w&m)
  Barnhill Music Corp.
  BMI: Allen Music
  T-26: "I'm No Good To You"
  (audio on YouTube)
  Willis Carroll (w&m)
  Carmen Taylor (w&m)
  BMI
6. Treat 505
  The Five Stars
  Released June 1955
  T-1: "Let's Fall in Love" (© 1933; renewed 1961)
  From the 1933 film Let's Fall in Love
  Ted Koehler (words)
  Harold Arlen (music)
  ASCAP: Bourne, Inc.
  T-2: "We Danced in the Moonlight"
  By Alton Earl Collier
  Alan Music Co.
  BMI: Allan Music Co.
7. Treat 506
  Buddy Lowe
  T-27: "Goodbye Baby"
  (audio on YouTube)
  By Lowe & Grant
  BMI: Allen Music
  T-28: "Run Fast, Don't Walk"
  (audio on YouTube)
  Willis Carroll (w&m)
  Carmen Taylor (w&m)
  BMI: Marlyn Music
8. Treat 507
  Frankie Day
  Released July 1955
  T-30: "When I Dream of Home"
  With the Ray Charles Singers
  ASCAP: Box & Cox
  OCLC 81245831
  T-31: "Don't Forget"
  BMI: Raleigh
  OCLC 84349063

Selected re-issues

T-501: Re-released on Lost-Nite 198
T-502: Re-released on Lost-Nite 143
