= Live (Percy Mayfield album) =

Live album by Percy Mayfield
- Released: 1992
- Recorded: 1981 – 1983
- Genre: Blues
- Label: Winner
- Producer: Mark Naftalin

Percy Mayfield chronology
| For Collectors Only (1992) | Live (1992) | Percy Mayfield, Vol. 2: Memory Pain (1992) |

Live is an album by the American musician Percy Mayfield, released in 1992. It is his only authorized live recording.

== Production ==
The album was produced by Mark Naftalin, who also put out the album through his record label, Winner. It was recorded from 1981 to 1983 as part of Naftalin's "Blue Monday Party" programs in the San Francisco Bay Area. Pee Wee Crayton contributed on guitar.

== Critical reception ==
Professional ratings
Review scores
| Source | Rating |
|---|---|
| All Music Guide to the Blues | 3/5 stars |
| Chicago Tribune | 3/4 stars |
| DownBeat | 4/5 stars |
| The Encyclopedia of Popular Music | 3/5 stars |
| The Grove Press Guide to the Blues on CD | 3/5 stars |
| MusicHound Blues: The Essential Album Guide | 3/5 stars |
| (The New) Rolling Stone Album Guide | 3/5 stars |

The Chicago Tribune said that Mayfield "proves that his subtle, low-key vocal interpretations were extraordinary to the end." Rolling Stone stated that he "spins heart-stopping tales of loneliness, despair, addiction and redemption, timeless comments on life at the edges of American society." The Star-Gazette called the album "a quintessential collection of after-hours, up-close-and-personal blues ballads, sung by one of the great masters". The Boston Globe opined that Mayfield's singing "is completely relaxed, with matchless phrasing, and his voice conveys depths of emotion and humor."

== Track listing ==
| No. | Title | Length |
|---|---|---|
| 1. | "Never Say Naw" |
| 2. | "The River's Invitation" |
| 3. | "Strange Things Happening" |
| 4. | "Don't Start Lying to Me" |
| 5. | "Loose Lips" |
| 6. | "My Jug and I" |
| 7. | "Please Send Me Someone to Love" |
| 8. | "My Mind Is Trying to Leave Me Too" |
| 9. | "The Flirt" |
| 10. | "P.M. Blues" |
| 11. | "Medley: My Bottle Is My Companion / The Highway Is Like a Woman" |
