= Louis Speiginer =

20th century American Jazz guitarist

Louis Speiginer (January 20, 1915 – August 8, 1982) was an American jazz guitarist active from the 1930s into the 1960s. He was a session guitarist for Hollywood films, and also performed, recorded, and toured with several jazz groups. By 1962 he had retired from full time performance, and ended his career as a music educator in California. He was married to the civil rights activist Gertha Speiginer.

== Life and career ==
Louis Sol Speiginer was born in Phillips County, Arkansas on January 20, 1915. He grew up in St. Louis, Missouri where he started playing guitar when he was approximately 8 or 9 years old. He began his career playing in professional jazz bands in St. Louis during the 1930s. He married his high school sweetheart, Gertha, in St. Louis. Gertha later became a well known civil rights activist in California. In 1938 he was a member of Joe Deshon's swing band which was engaged for an extended run at Sauter’s Amusement Park in St. Louis. After this he toured in bands in the American Southwest prior to moving to Los Angeles in c. 1939. There he played and recorded with a variety of bands; including playing guitar for the film soundtrack of Juke Box Jenny (1942).

Over the next two decades, Speiginer divided his time between working in Hollywood films as a staff session guitarist, recording music with various jazz groups, and touring as a band member with a variety of artists. Some of the musicians he worked with included Lionel Hampton, Lena Horne, Charlie Mingus, and Phil Moore. He performed and recorded periodically with Buddy Tate's band from 1945-1950. This included the 1947 LP Jumpin' On the West Coast. That same year he played guitar on Jimmy Witherspoon's hit recording Ain't Nobody's Business which charted for 34 consecutive weeks on Billboard magazine's R&B chart; including reaching the number 1 spot for a brief period. In 1949 he recorded the blues song "Alone in the City" with Ray Charles.

By 1962, Speiginer had ceased performing full time and was working in Pomona, California as a music teacher and a sales representative for the David Platt Music Co. He moved his career in this direction to better meet the needs of his family. Speiginer and his wife Gertha had eight daughters together. They lived in Los Angeles and Fontana prior to settling permanently in Pomona.

Speiginer died in Pomona, California on August 8, 1982.

== Partial discography ==
- "Norbo Boogie" Colonial (113A)
- Louis Speiginer's Orchestra- Wandering Gal Blues // Hey Mr. Landlord (Landlord Shuffle) Supreme Records, Los Angeles AP105 (1947)
- Louis Speiginer's Orchestra- Cain River Blues // How I Hate To See Xmas Come Around (Christmas Blues) Supreme Records, Los Angeles AP106 (1947)
- Swing Time Shouters Volume 2 (West Coast label, recorded 1947-1949)

== See also ==
- Swing Time Records
