= Big Jim Wynn =

American saxophonist (1912–1977)

- Born: James A. Wynn Jr. June 21, 1908; El Paso, Texas, United States
- Died: July 19, 1977 (aged 69) Los Angeles, California, United States
- Genres: Jazz, swing, jump blues, rhythm and blues
- Occupation: Musician
- Instruments: Tenor saxophone, baritone saxophone
- Years active: 1930s–1977

James A. Wynn Jr. (June 21, 1908 – July 19, 1977), known as Big Jim Wynn, was an American jump blues saxophonist, pianist and bandleader.

== Life and career ==
Born in El Paso, Texas, he moved with his parents to Los Angeles when he was a baby. He learned piano and clarinet, before switching to tenor saxophone in his teens. He began playing in clubs in Watts, where he started playing jazz and swing music, and formed his own band in the mid-1930s, with his friend T-Bone Walker, who was initially known as a dancer, on guitar and vocals.

He made his first recordings for the 4 Star and Gilt-Edge labels in 1945, credited as Jim Wynn and his Bobalibans, with Claude Trenier on vocals. Although the song "Be-Baba-Leba" (or "Ee-Bobaliba", from which the band took its name) was first recorded by Helen Humes, for whom it was a hit, Wynn claimed to have written and first performed it several months previously, though it was not credited to him in later versions which included Lionel Hampton's bigger hit, "Hey! Ba-Ba-Re-Bop". Wynn's band comprised Stanley Casey (trumpet), David Graha (alto sax), Freddie Simon (tenor sax), Jim Wynn (tenor and baritone sax), Luther "Lord" Luper (piano, vocals), Theodore Shirley (bass), Robert "Snake" Sims (drums), Claude Trenier (vocals), and Pee Wee Wiley (vocals).

The following year, they recorded for Modern Records, and in 1948 for the Specialty and Supreme labels. However, Wynn's records were not commercially successful, and he began working as a sideman in T-Bone Walker's band, mainly playing the baritone saxophone. By the late 1940s, Wynn had developed an innovative performance style, involving dancing, stomping, and playing the saxophone while laying on his back. One reviewer said: "He would kick, dance, shuffle, strut, go down on his knees, roll and literally provide his own mini-show on stage, all the while blowing wild solos on his sax. He was the first of the Los Angeles area sax players to perform these antics on stage...". Wynn himself said: "Jay McNeely was a little kid when he used to come in and watch me play at weekends. Two or three years later he was laying on his back and playing. He's a great musician but he got the clowning from me."

Although Wynn made further recordings as leader in the 1950s, for various labels including Mercury with a band that included saxophonist Eddie "Lockjaw" Davis and guitarist Charles "Chuck" Norris, they were not hits. He worked as a session musician on many blues, R&B, soul and pop records made on independent labels in Los Angeles in the 1950s and 1960s. He toured with Etta James and Richard Berry, and also worked extensively as a member of Johnny Otis' revue band.

Wynn died in Los Angeles in 1977, aged 69.
