= Hey! Ba-Ba-Re-Bop =

Single by Lionel Hampton and his Orchestra
- B-side: "Slide, Hamp, Slide"
- Released: January 1946
- Recorded: Late 1945
- Genre: Swing, jump blues
- Length: 2:57
- Label: Decca (18754)
- Songwriter(s): Lionel Hampton, Curley Hamner

Lionel Hampton and his Orchestra singles chronology
"Beulah's Boogie" (1945)	"Hey! Ba-Ba-Re-Bop" (1946)	"Hamp's Salty Blues" (1946)

"Hey! Ba-Ba-Re-Bop" is a 1946 song by Lionel Hampton and His Orchestra. The song's lead vocals were performed by Lionel Hampton himself and the recording featured Herbie Fields on alto sax. The song went to number one on the R&B Juke Box chart for sixteen non-consecutive weeks and reached number nine on the national pop charts.

Although the writing of "Hey! Ba-Ba-Re-Bop" was credited to Hampton and his drummer Curley Hamner, it was essentially a partial rewriting of Helen Humes' 1945 R&B hit "Be-Baba-Leba", which in turn was closely related to "Ee-Bobaliba" by Jim Wynn.

== Precursors ==
The song "Be-Baba-Leba" was recorded by Helen Humes with the Bill Doggett Octet in August 1945, in Los Angeles, and rose to number 3 on the Billboard R&B chart at the end of the year. The writing of the song was credited to Humes, who wrote the lyrics, such as: "He thrills me in the morning, thrills me in the night, the way he loves me makes me scream with delight, oooh oooh oooh baba-leba....". The vocal choruses are interspersed with saxophone breaks by Wild Bill Moore, who was brought in by Doggett for the session.

Pianist Jelly Roll Morton said that "Be-Baba-Leba"'s riff was "so old it's got whiskers", and it is close to the one on "Boogie Woogie" recorded by Jimmy Rushing with Count Basie in 1937. However, the scat wording apparently derives from "Ee-Bobaliba", a song performed by saxophonist and bandleader Jim Wynn in the early 1940s with his band, the Bobalibans. By that time, the term "bebop" or similar terms like "ba-re-bop" were becoming popular among musicians to describe the new forms of jazz being performed by such musicians as Dizzy Gillespie. Wynn recorded his song, with vocalist Claude Trenier, after Humes recorded "Be-Baba-Leba", and it did not make the chart.

== Lionel Hampton recording ==
Once Humes' record had become a hit, Decca Records rushed Lionel Hampton into the studio to record a similar song, which became "Hey! Ba-Ba-Re-Bop". Their arrangement was similar to Jim Wynn's but added a call and response element between Hampton and his musicians, and replaced Humes' salacious verses with nonsense rhymes like: "Matilda Brown told old King Tut, 'If you can't say rebop keep your big mouth shut', say hey ba-ba-re-bop...". Hampton was already a popular and established musician, at a bigger company than Humes' Philo, and his version soon knocked Humes off the charts and went to number one on the R&B chart for 16 weeks (a record broken at that time only by Joe Liggins' "The Honeydripper" and Louis Jordan's "Choo Choo Ch'Boogie").

The song is viewed in some respects as a precursor to rock and roll. Reviewer Lindsay Planer wrote of Hampton's recording:

The cut immediate gets fired up with Hampton's trademark two-fingered piano lick as it beckons to hipsters of all stripes. He is joined by the rhythm section, which establishes a solid boogie-woogie tempo leading up to the catchy chorus. The verses are offered in a halting style, with the combo accenting the first downbeat, then laying out for the other three in the measure. This effective technique would later show up as a sonic hallmark of blues arrangements. The lyrics are presented in short rhymes... Between the second and final couplet there is an extended instrumental break, giving the trumpet and clarinet room to wail. Hampton returns with some improvised scat vocals and another round of the chorus before heading into the concluding lines and one last coda of the chorus.

== Later versions and influence ==
Hampton was also responsible for recording another version of the song, "Hey-Ba-Ra-Re-Bop", by Wynonie Harris, which was released on his Hamp-Tone label, though Hampton himself did not play on the session. The song was also covered by Tex Beneke with the Glenn Miller Orchestra, as "Hey! Ba-Ba-Re-Bop", which reached number 4 on the pop chart in 1946. Other versions, though technically listed as different songs, included Dizzy Gillespie's "Bob A Lee Ba" and Tina Dixon's "E-Bop-O-Lee-Bop".

The use of nonsense syllables to convey excitement was passed on in later years in such songs as Gene Vincent's "Be-Bop-A-Lula" and Little Richard's "awopbopaloobop alopbamboom" in "Tutti Frutti", both in 1956.

Holger Czukay recorded several versions of a track "Hey! Ba-Ba-Re-Bop", inspired by a live recording of Hampton's performance in Hamburg in the 1950s; Czukay's version appears on the album Rome Remains Rome.

== See also ==
- Billboard Most-Played Race Records of 1946
