= Freddie Mitchell (jazz musician) =

American jazz musician

Freddie Mitchell (April 8, 1918, Tampa, Florida – June 9, 2010, Mount Vernon, New York) was an American jazz musician and bandleader. A multi-instrumentalist, he began his career as a jazz pianist in his early teens and then became a clarinetist and a saxophonist; ultimately becoming most closely associated with the tenor saxophone. By 1941 he was playing in Benny Carter's band with whom he made his earliest recordings. He toured and made recordings with Fletcher Henderson and his band in 1941–1942; after which he worked with Hot Lips Page, Louis Armstrong, and Carter again before joining Ovie Alston's band in late 1942. He remained a part of that group through 1946. He then led his own band with whom he made albums on the Derby Records label, and toured the United States and Europe during the late 1940s and 1950s. He retired from full-time performance in the late 1950s and worked as a taxi driver. He did continue to play professionally part time, going by the nickname Taxi Mitchell.
