= Ovie Alston =

American jazz trumpeter, vocalist, and bandleader (1905–1989)

- Born: Overton Alston; December 14, 1905
- Died: 1989 (aged 83–84)
- Occupations: trumpeter, vocalist, bandleader
- Instruments: trumpet, vocals
- Years active: 1928–1952
- Labels: Brunswick Records

Overton "Ovie" Alston (December 14, 1905 – 1989) was an American jazz trumpeter, vocalist, and bandleader.

Alston played with Bill Brown and His Brownies in New York in 1928, recording with them for Brunswick Records. He was hired by Claude Hopkins in 1931 and remained with him until 1936; it is for this association that he is best known. After leaving Hopkins he started his own band, playing at the Apollo Theater, the Plantation Club, the Ubangi Club and the Roseland Ballroom in the late 1930s and early 1940s. He toured with the band for the armed forces during World War II; Noble Sissle, Freddie Mitchell, and Eubie Blake joined the group during this time.

Alston continued working major New York hotels and ballrooms after the war; his sidemen included, at times, Bobby Sands, Edmond Hall, and Fernando Arbello. Late in his career he did mostly private concerts.
