= Open the Door, Richard! =

"Open the Door, Richard"
- Early sheet music cover

Single by Jack McVea and His All Stars
- B-side: "Lonesome Blues"
- Released: 1946
- Recorded: 1946
- Genre: Rhythm and blues; novelty song
- Length: 2:58
- Label: Black & White
- Composers: John Mason; Don Howell
- Lyricists: Jack McVea; Frank Clarke

"Open the Door, Richard" is a song first recorded by the saxophonist Jack McVea in 1946 for Black & White Records at the suggestion of A&R man Ralph Bass. In 1947, it was the number one song on Billboard's "Honor Roll of Hits".

== Origin ==
"Open the Door, Richard" began as a black vaudeville routine. Pigmeat Markham, one of several who performed the routine, attributed it to his mentor Bob Russell. According to Markham, Russell wrote the piece for a show called Mr. Rareback, in which the comedian John Mason performed it (and presumably expanded it in improvisation). Mason, Russell, and Markham were all African-American comedians; all performed in blackface.

The routine was made famous by Dusty Fletcher on stages such as the Apollo Theater in New York City and in a short film. Dressed in rags, drunk, and with a ladder as his only prop, Fletcher would repeatedly plunk the ladder down stage center, try to climb it to knock on an imaginary door, then crash sprawling on the floor after a few steps while shouting, half-singing "Open the Door, Richard". After this, he would mutter a comic monologue, then try the ladder again and repeat the process, while the audience was imagining what Richard was so occupied doing.

Jack McVea was responsible for the musical riff associated with the phrase "Open the Door, Richard", which became familiar to radio listeners.

== Composition ==
In the song, accompanied by a rhythm section and McVea's expressive tenor honking, the intoxicated, rowdy band members come home late at night, knowing that Richard has the only key to the house. Knocking and repeated calls from McVea and the band members for Richard to open the door get no result. The musical refrain kicks in with the musicians singing in unison:

Open the door, Richard
Open the door and let me in
Open the door, Richard
Richard, why don't you open that door!

The spoken dialogue makes humorous references to negative aspects of urban African-American life, including poverty and police brutality. The narrator explains: "I know he's in there, 'cause I got on the clothes." He also says "I was on relief, but they got short of help and you had to go downtown to pick up the checks, so I gave it up." Later, when a policeman tells him to come down from the ladder and begins hitting his feet, the narrator protests: "You act like one of them police that ain't never arrested nobody before." Although the neighbors are being disturbed, McVea continues knocking as the song fades away.

== Charting versions ==
- Jack McVea recorded the original "Open the Door, Richard" in October 1946 and it was released by Black & White Records. It entered the Billboard Best Seller chart on February 14, 1947, and lasted two weeks there, peaking at number seven. It ends with a fade-out instead of the "cold" or final note ending that had previously been employed on commercial records.
- Count Basie's version was released by RCA Victor Records with vocals by Harry "Sweets" Edison and Bill Johnson. It entered the Billboard Best Seller chart on February 7, 1947, and lasted four weeks there, peaking at number one.
- Dusty Fletcher recorded it for National Records. It entered the Billboard Best Seller chart on January 31, 1947, and lasted five weeks there, peaking at number three.
- The Three Flames's version was released by Columbia Records. It entered the Billboard Best Seller chart on February 14, 1947, and lasted three weeks there, peaking at number four.
- Louis Jordan recorded it for Decca Records. It entered the Billboard Best Seller chart on March 7, 1947, and lasted two weeks there, peaking at number seven.

== Copyright dispute ==
The origins of the piece in a vaudeville routine led to there being several claimants to the copyright. Russell was no longer alive, but both Mason and Fletcher came forth claiming to have written it; Fletcher even claimed that he had written the tune. By the time the dust settled, the official credits read "Words by Dusty Fletcher and John Mason, music by Dusty Fletcher and Don Howell". Howell appears to have been an entirely fictional front through which someone managed to pocket some of the royalties at McVea's expense.

== Bibliography ==
- Dawson, Jim; Propes, Steve (1992). What Was the First Rock'n'Roll Record. Boston, London: Faber and Faber. ISBN 0-571-12939-0.
- Fox, Ted (1993). Showtime at the Apollo (2nd ed.). New York City: Da Capo Press. ISBN 0-306-80503-0.
- Shaw, Arnold (1978). Honkers and Shouters. New York: Macmillan. ISBN 0-02-061740-2.
- Smith, R. J. (2004). "This is Pop". Richard Speaks! Chasing a Tune from the Chitlin Circuit to the Mormon Tabernacle. Harvard University Press. ISBN 0-674-01321-2.
- Whitburn, Joel (1988). Top R&B Singles 1942–1988. Menomonee Falls, Wisconsin: Record Research. ISBN 0-89820-068-7.
