= Percy Mayfield =

American rhythm and blues singer-songwriter (1920–1984)

Background information
- Born: August 12, 1920; Minden, Louisiana, U.S.
- Died: August 11, 1984 (aged 63) Los Angeles, California, U.S.
- Genre: Rhythm and blues
- Occupations: Singer, songwriter
- Instrument: Vocals
- Years active: 1947–1960s
- Labels: Specialty, Chess, Imperial, Tangerine
- Formerly of: Ray Charles

Percy Mayfield (August 12, 1920 – August 11, 1984) was an American rhythm and blues singer with a smooth vocal style. He was also a songwriter, known for the songs "Please Send Me Someone to Love" and "Hit the Road Jack", the latter being a song first recorded by Ray Charles.

== Career ==
Mayfield was born in Minden, Louisiana, the seat of Webster Parish, in the northwestern part of the state. As a youth, he had a talent for poetry, which led him to songwriting and singing. He began his performing career in Texas and then moved to Los Angeles in 1942, but without success as a singer until 1947, when a small record label, Swing Time Records, signed him to record his song "Two Years of Torture," with a band that included the saxophonist Maxwell Davis, the guitarist Chuck Norris, and the pianist Willard McDaniel. The record sold steadily over the next few years, prompting Art Rupe to sign Mayfield to his label, Specialty Records, in 1950.

Mayfield's vocal style was influenced by such stylists as Charles Brown, but unlike many West Coast bluesmen, Mayfield did not focus on the white market. He sang blues ballads, mostly songs he wrote himself, in a gentle vocal style. His most famous song, "Please Send Me Someone to Love", a number one R&B hit single in late 1950, described by the reviewer Bill Dahl as "a multi-layered universal lament", was widely influential and recorded by many other singers. His career flourished as a string of six Top 10 R&B hits followed, like "Lost Love" and "The Big Question", confirming his status as a leading blues ballad singer and "a true master at expressing his innermost feelings, laced with vulnerability and pathos".

Mayfield performed at the 7th Annual Cavalcade of Jazz concert held at Wrigley Field in Los Angeles on July 8, 1951, produced by Leon Hefflin Sr. along with Billy Eckstine, Lionel Hampton, Jimmy Witherspoon, Roy Brown, and Joe Liggins and his Honey Drippers.

In 1952, at the height of his popularity, Mayfield was severely injured in an automobile crash, when he was returning from a performance in Las Vegas to Los Angeles as the front-seat passenger in a chauffeur-driven car. The vehicle hit the back of an unseen stationary truck, and Mayfield was hit by debris. Though pronounced dead at the scene, he eventually recovered but spent two years convalescing. The accident left him with a facial disfigurement that eventually ended his career as a performer but did not halt his prolific songwriting. He continued to write and record for Specialty, and after 1954 he recorded for Chess Records, Cash Records, Imperial Records, and Seven Arts. Mayfield and his Orchestra did appear for his 2nd appearance at the 11th annual Cavalcade of Jazz held at Wrigley Field in Los Angeles on July 24, 1955, along with Lionel Hampton again with another stellar line-up.

In 1961, Mayfield's song "Hit the Road Jack" brought him to the attention of Ray Charles, who signed him to his Tangerine Records, primarily as a songwriter. Mayfield wrote "Hide nor Hair", "At the Club", "Danger Zone", and "But on the Other Hand, Baby" for Tangerine, and Charles, who had him signed to a five-year contract as his private songwriter, recorded at least 15 of his songs. He also had a series of single releases as a vocalist on Tangerine, produced by Charles, including a remake of "River's Invitation", which crept into the Billboard Hot 100 but reached number 25 on the R&B chart in 1963. Two albums were also released, largely compilations of his singles.

Following his Brunswick and RCA recordings in the late 1960s/early 1970s, Mayfield signed briefly with Atlantic Records, for which the soul and blues artist Johnny "Guitar" Watson produced a minor R&B hit for him, "I Don't Want to Be the President", which spent 5 weeks on the charts in 1974, peaking at 64.

In the early 1980s, the Bay Area keyboardist Mark Naftalin discovered that Mayfield was living in the East Bay area and invited him to collaborate in recordings and for live performances in several Marin County and East Bay clubs. The exposure led to a 1982 studio date for the Dutch company Timeless Records with the Phillip Walker Blues Band, recording the album Hit the Road Again, which was released in 1983. Naftalin later produced the videodocumentary "Percy Mayfield: Poet Laureate of the Blues" featuring Mayfield's performances and testimonies from B. B. King and Ray Charles. Recordings of some performances with Naftalin were also released post-humously in the 1992 album Live.

== Personal life ==
Mayfield married three times. His first wife was Dessie Mayfield. His second wife was Willie Mae Atlas Mayfield. His third wife was Tina Mayfield. He began working with Tina, also a blues musician, when she moved to Los Angeles in 1972; they became married in 1984, and he died later that year.

Percy had two children. Percy Mayfield Jr aka Cecil Mayfield and Pamela, now known as Pamela Hobdy.

Percy Mayfield died of a heart attack while at home in Los Angeles on August 11, 1984, one day before his 64th birthday. At his funeral, Little Richard performed "Thank You, Jesus" and "Swing Low, Sweet Chariot".

== Discography ==
=== Albums ===
Year	Album	Label
1966	My Jug and I	Tangerine Records
1969	Walking on a Tightrope	Brunswick Records
1970	Weakness Is a Thing Called Man	RCA Victor Records
1970	Percy Mayfield Sings Percy Mayfield	RCA Victor Records
1971	Blues... and Then Some	RCA Victor Records
1971	Bought Blues	Tangerine Records
1983	Hit the Road Again (with the Phillip Walker Blues Band)	Timeless Records
1990	Percy Mayfield: Poet of the Blues	Specialty Records
1992	Live	Winner Records
1992	Percy Mayfield, Vol. 2: Memory Pain	Specialty Records

=== Singles ===
Year	Single	Peak positions	
Year	Single	US Pop	US R&B
1950	"Please Send Me Someone to Love" / "Strange Things Happening"	26 —	1; 7
1951	"Lost Love"	—	2
1951	"What a Fool I Was"	—	8
1951	"Prayin' for Your Return"	—	9
1952	"Cry Baby"	—	9
1952	"The Big Question"	—	6
1963	"River's Invitation"	99	25
1970	"To Live the Past"	—	41
1974	"I Don't Want to Be the President"	—	64
