= Felix Gross (musician) =

American jazz musician

Felix Gross was an American singer and musician as well as a composer. He was active in the 1940s and 1950s. Down Beat Records Blue Moon collection issued a compilation of his recordings. He also recorded with Chess Records. Gross recorded as Felix Gross & His Sextette and Felix Gross and his Orchestra. Band members he recorded with included Henry Coker, Maxwell Davis, Buddy Floyd, Tiny Webb on guitar, Joe Howard on tenor sax, Minor Robinson on drums, as well as Rolf Beleman, Doug Byers, Albert Elam, Adam Green, and Joe Stone.

== Discography ==
=== Records ===
- "Love for Christmas" from Savoy Jazz Christmas Blues (1949) and also off Felix Gross – Essential Rhythm & Blues (1947–1955) / Felix Gross – The Complete Recordings 1947 – 1955
- "Love For Christmas" Savoy 720, 1146 SLA4434-3
- "Who Can You Be" Regent 1019 SLA4435
- "You Don't Love Me" Savoy 720 SLA4436-3
- "You're Great To Me" Regent 1019 SLA4437
- "Love For Christmas" / "You Don't Love Me" Savoy 720
- "Who Can You Be" / "You're Great To Me" Regent 1019

=== Songs ===
- "Love for Christmas" off Felix Gross 100 Christmas Blues – Songs to Get You Through the Cold
- "Peaceful Lovin'" off Felix Gross Love Songs – Rare Vintage Masters
- "Don't Make Me Late, Baby" off Felix Gross – Essential Rhythm & Blues (1947–1955)
- "Let's Get Together" off Felix Gross – Essential Rhythm & Blues (1947–1955)
- "You Done Me Wrong" off Felix Gross – Essential Rhythm & Blues (1947–1955)
- "F. G. Boogie" off Felix Gross Essential Rhythm & Blues (1947–1955)
- "You're Great To Me" off Felix Gross Essential Rhythm & Blues (1947–1955)
- "You Can't Do That No More" off Felix Gross – Essential Rhythm & Blues (1947–1955)
- "You Don't Love Me" off Felix Gross – Essential Rhythm & Blues (1947–1955)
- "Going To Get Straight off Felix Gross – Essential Rhythm & Blues (1947–1955)
