= Eddie Wilcox =

American jazz musician (1907–1968)

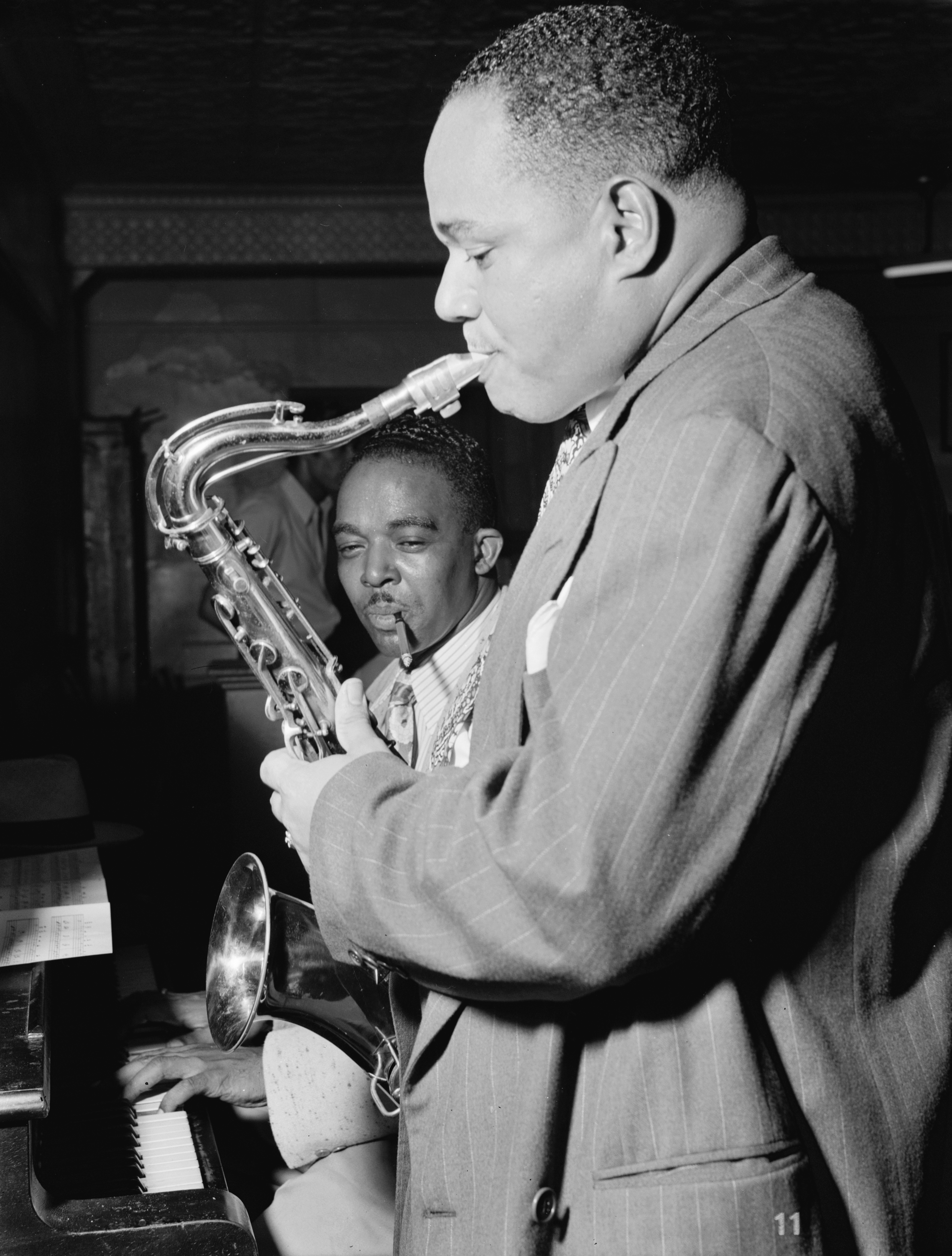
Wilcox (background) and Joe Thomas, New York, Oct. 1947

Eddie Wilcox (December 27, 1907 – September 29, 1968) was an American jazz pianist and arranger.

== Biography ==
Born in Method, North Carolina, Wilcox studied at Fisk University, where he met Jimmie Lunceford. He played with Lunceford in college bands and then professionally in the mid-1920s. In 1929 he became the main arranger for Lunceford's ensemble, and remained so until Lunceford's death in 1947. He was named co-leader with Joe Thomas after Lunceford died, and became sole leader in January 1949, where he remained until the group disbanded early in the 1950s. His 1952 cover version recording of "Wheel of Fortune" became a hit in the U.S., peaking at #14. Following this Wilcox played solo at the Cafe Riviera in New York City for nearly a decade.

He along with Jazz tenor saxophonest Teddy McRae founded the Raecox record label in the 1950s, issuing R&B music. He also worked as an executive for Riviera Records and Derby Records. Shortly before his death he worked with Russell Moore.
