= Willard McDaniel =

American jazz musician

Willard McDaniel (November 15, 1915 – December 13, 1961) was an American jazz and blues singer and pianist.

He was born in Stamps, Arkansas. He started playing the piano at an early age. He lived in California from the mid-1930s, where he began playing in Hollywood with Roy Milton's group, later working as a session musician at Specialty Records. He performed in a distinctive stride piano style that has been compared to Fats Waller. McDaniel released most of his work during the 1950s. In 1958, Crown Records issued his album 88 a la Carte, with McDaniel leading a jazz trio performing standards in an easy listening style.

He died in 1961 in Los Angeles at the age of 46.

His work is also featured on other records, including Singin' the Blues and was a member of the band Gene Phillips & His Rhythm Aces.

He contributed to films such as Young Man with a Horn, Panic in the Streets and The World in His Arms. Compilations include 100 Christmas Blues - Songs To Get You Through The Cold released in 2014, Blues 'N Boogie in 2012, and Specialty Legends of Boogie Woogie released in 1992.

== Discography ==
- 88 A La Carte (Crown, 1958)
- "The Curse of an Aching Heart/My Sin" (Crown, 1954) (single)
- "Ciri-Biri-Bin Boogie" (Specialty Records) (single)
