= Paula Watson =

R&B and jazz vocalist and pianist

Background information
- Born: Pauline Mazeppa Henry; September 9, 1927; Mobile, Alabama, United States
- Died: October 19, 2003 (aged 76) Malmö, Sweden
- Genres: Rhythm and blues, jazz
- Occupation: Singer
- Instrument: Piano
- Years active: c.1948–1970s
- Labels: Supreme, Decca

Paula Watson (née Pauline Mazeppa Henry; September 9, 1927 – October 19, 2003) was an American jazz and R&B singer and pianist.

== Biography ==
Watson was born in Mobile, Alabama. After moving to California, she recorded for the Supreme label in Los Angeles, and her first single, "A Little Bird Told Me", written by jazz pianist Harvey Brooks and featuring guitarist Tiny Webb, reached number 2 on the Billboard R&B chart (then called the "Race Records" chart), and number 6 on the pop chart. The song was covered by Evelyn Knight for Decca Records, with a similar musical arrangement, and Supreme sued Decca for damages. In the meantime, Watson had a second R&B chart hit with "You Broke Your Promise", which reached number 13. However, Supreme lost their case against Decca, and the company went out of business soon afterwards.

She performed as a "rowdy vocalist...[and] vigorous pianist who could lay down a mean boogie-woogie blues". In late 1949 she began recording for Decca in a style similar to Nellie Lutcher and Julia Lee, backed by saxophonist Jerry Jerome's orchestra and the vocal group Four Hits & A Miss. However, her more conservative records were not hits and she moved in 1953 to MGM Records, where her recordings were described as "significantly hipper" and featured saxophonist Sam "The Man" Taylor and bassist Milt Hinton.

In the early 1960s, she left the US, and worked in cabaret in London, England, through the 1960s and early 1970s. By the 1990s, she was based in Hamburg, Germany. She died in Malmö, Sweden, in 2003, aged 76.
