= Ulysses Livingston =

American jazz musician (1912–1988)

Ulysses Livingston (January 29, 1912, Bristol, Tennessee - October 7, 1988, Los Angeles) was an American jazz guitarist and bass guitarist.

Livingston's career in music began in the band of Horace Henderson as a roadie (or, as Henderson called them, "valet"). Prior to this he had played in the band of the West Virginia State College. After his period with Henderson he played in carnival bands on traveling road shows. In the middle of the 1930s he began to get jazz gigs with Lil Armstrong, Frankie Newton, Sammy Price, Coleman Hawkins, and Benny Carter. After moving to New York City, he accompanied Ella Fitzgerald on tour and on record. He served briefly in the military during World War II, but returned to jazz playing on the West Coast in 1943. He played with Cee Pee Johnson in Hawaii in 1947.

Alongside his guitar playing, Livingston also sang with the Spirits of Rhythm, and led a group called the Four Blazes. From the 1950s he did freelance work with West Coast jazz musicians and also became active as a record producer. In the 1970s he took up electric bass alongside the guitar, and recorded with both instruments.

== Discography ==
With Joe Williams

- With Love (Temponic, 1972)
