= The Cardinals =

American R&B group

The Cardinals were an American R&B group of the 1950s. Sharing a legacy with the Orioles, The Cardinals are remembered as one of the best R&B ballad acts to come out of Baltimore.

== Origins ==
The Cardinals’ career began in 1946 (one year before The Orioles) when Leon Hardy and Meredith Brothers convinced Donald Johnson to join them in harmony on the corner of Gay Street and Forest. Johnson drafted his friend Ernie Warren to round out a quartet and the new group on the block became The Mellotones. They did the usual round of Baltimore bars and nightclubs for experience, singing the songs of black and white pop groups such as The Fortunes, The Ink Spots, and The Ames Brothers. They picked up a fifth member, Jack Aydelotte, when he and they were separately scheduled to perform on The Major Baumgartner Show, a local TV talent show. They never got on the air as the show ran overtime, but thanks to the booking they now had five members including an accompanist (Jack also played guitar).

== Recording contract ==
The years passed and a record contract came their way with the help of Super Music Record Shop store owner Sam Azrael. With group member Donald Johnson working in the store for years, Azrael had had plenty of exposure to the crooners. When Herb Abramson, co-founder of Atlantic Records, passed through Baltimore in 1951 on a talent search, Azrael gave the act an audition, and it's reported the group left the shop that very night as the newest artists on Atlantic.

In March 1950 the group came to New York, cutting four sides for their first release and simultaneously becoming The Cardinals. Five months later Shouldn’t I Know peaked at #7 on the Billboard Best Seller R&B chart. It is a pretty ballad that was written by Meredith Brothers, but in a maneuver that was typical of the music business at the time, store owner Azrael wound up listed as a co-writer.

Their next session of songs, recorded on October 6, 1950, included their second single I’ll Always Love You, another ballad that featuring Warren's strong lead ably supported by the warbling Cardinals. They also recorded an R&B version of Wheel of Fortune later to be released as their 3rd single in March 1952. Between February and March 1952, various versions of the song were pop hits for Kay Starr (#1), Bobby Wayne (#6), The Bell Sisters (#10) and Sunny Gale (#13). The Cardinals (#6), along with Dinah Washington (#3), scored R&B hits.

== Member changes ==
Right after the release of Wheel of Fortune, Warren was drafted and replaced by Leander Tarver. The new member led the group through their next single, “The Bump,” released the first week of August 1952.

Toward the end of 1952 Tarver left and James Brown (not James Brown) joined. Warren returned on leave from the military just in time to record You Are My Only Love and three other tunes on January 13, 1953. With James Brown still in the lineup, this session benefited from six very good voices.

== Next releases ==
The group had not had a single in five months and it was beginning to appear that Atlantic was either losing interest or waiting for Warren to return full-time from the army. This is at least one possible explanation for the release of only two singles in two years. They were You Are My Only Love, released the fourth week of May 1953, and Under a Blanket of Blue (a song recorded nearly 2 1/2 years earlier) released the third week of April 1954. Warren rejoined the group full-time in March 1954, but the septet wasn't brought in to record until January 18, 1955, more than two years after their last session. The primary yield of this four-song date was the Chuck Willis-penned The Door Is Still Open to My Heart, which was issued as a single in the fourth week of February 1955.

A stunning vocal interpretation of a deceptively simple melody gave the Cardinals their biggest hit as The Door Is Still Open (To My Heart) reached top 10 R&B Best Seller and #7 Jukebox for a total of 13 weeks. Billboard R&B charts later listed it as the 43rd best seller of 1955.

The Cardinals' records at this time were some of their best, though not their most popular. In July 1955 Atlantic released the group's 8th single, Come Back My Love, a song issued five months earlier by Rama Records artists The Wrens. Neither charted, though both would later become doo wop cult classics. December arrived with Here Goes My Heart to You, an ultra-smooth ballad that somehow escaped notice. The same happened to their all-time best ballad effort Offshore and The End of the Story, their next-to-last Atlantic single.

The group's last Atlantic single was another ballad titled One Love, worth mentioning because of the writing team that created it, Lou Stallman and Joe Shapiro (the same pair who wrote Perry Como’s hit “Round and Round”). It was released in January 1957, just around the time the group called it quits. Warren formed a new group in late 1957 with tenors Sonny Hatchett and Jimmy Ricks (not The Ravens’ bass lead), baritone Richard Williams, and Jim Boone on bass. They recorded several sides, including the early 1950s-sounding ballad Have I Been Gone Too Long. These almost a cappella recordings stayed in the vaults for 17 years until Bim Bam Boom Records released an EP of the songs.

== Group reformed ==
In 1958, Warren re-formed the original Cardinals with Johnson, Brothers, and Johnny Douglas, as well as Jim Boone. After a few months, the group added an all-white backup band, a strange combination for 1958. This backup band featured Bob Passon on bass and Jerry Passon's vocals.

The Cardinals performed into the early 1960s and then drifted apart for the last time. Among rhythm and blues record enthusiasts the group is as popular today as they were in the mid-1950s. Their nine Atlantic recording sessions produced 36 sides of which only 24 have ever been released.
