= Wheel of Fortune (1951 song) =

Composition by Bennie Benjamin and George David Weiss

Single by Kay Starr

from the album The Hits of Kay Starr
- B-side: "I Wanna Love You"
- Released: February 11, 1952
- Recorded: 1952
- Genre: Traditional pop
- Length: 3:04
- Label: Capitol
- Songwriters: Bennie Benjamin, George David Weiss

Kay Starr singles chronology
"On a Honky Tonk Hardwood Floor" (1951)	"Wheel of Fortune" (1952)	"I Waited a Little Too Long" (1952)

"Wheel of Fortune" is a popular song written by Bennie Benjamin and George David Weiss and published in 1951. It is best remembered in the 1952 hit version by Kay Starr.

The song was originally recorded in 1951, for RCA Victor by Johnny Hartman, and about the same time for Crescendo Records by Al Costello with the Walter Scott Orchestra.

Several hit versions of "Wheel of Fortune" were released in 1952. The first chart hit was by the Eddie Wilcox Orchestra featuring Sunny Gale, whose version reached number two on the rhythm and blues (R&B) chart and number 13 on the pop chart.

The most successful version was by Kay Starr, whose recording reached number one on the US pop chart in March 1952, staying there for 10 weeks. In 1998, the 1952 version by Kay Starr was inducted into the Grammy Hall of Fame.

Other hit versions in 1952 came from Dinah Washington (number three, R&B), Bobby Wayne (number six, pop), the Cardinals (number six, R&B), and the Bell Sisters (number 10, pop).

The song was also used as the theme to the television game show Wheel of Fortune.

== Recorded versions ==
- Eddie Wilcox and Sunny Gale's version first reached the Billboard Best Seller chart on February 1, 1952, and lasted six weeks on the chart, peaking at number 14.
- The Bell Sisters with Henri René & His Orchestra's version was recorded in Hollywood on December 18, 1951.
- The Cardinals' version was also released in 1952.
- Bobby Wayne with Joe Reisman's orchestra released a version that first reached the Billboard Best Seller chart on February 15, 1952, and lasted 10 weeks on the chart, peaking at number 13.
- The Knightsbridge Strings had a modest hit with the song in 1959.
- Susan Raye revived the song with a country version in 1972.

The song has also been recorded by The Barry Sisters, Ronnie Dove, Frankie Carle, The Four Flames, Ginny and the Gallions, Johnny Hartman, Helen Humes and Gerald Wiggins, Sammy Kaye's Orchestra, Maurice King's Wolverines, Skeets McDonald, Arthur Prysock, Jimmy Thomason, Dinah Washington, and the Billy Williams Quartet.

== See also ==
- List of number-one singles of 1952 (U.S.)
