= Impulse! Records =

American record label

- Parent company: Universal Music Group
- Founded: 1960
- Founder: Creed Taylor
- Distributor: Verve Records
- Genre: Jazz
- Country of origin: U.S.
- Location: New York, New York
- Official website: www.impulserecords.com

Impulse! Records (occasionally styled as "¡mpulse! Records" and "¡!") is an American jazz record label established by Creed Taylor in 1960. John Coltrane was among Impulse!'s earliest signings. Thanks to consistent sales and positive critiques of his recordings, the label came to be known as "the house that Trane built".

== History ==
Impulse!'s parent company, ABC-Paramount Records, was established in 1955 as the recording division of the American Broadcasting Company (ABC). In the 1940s and 1950s, ABC benefitted from the U.S. government's antitrust actions against broadcasters and film studios who were forced to divest parts of their companies. In the early 1950s, ABC acquired the Blue Network of radio stations from NBC and later merged with the newly independent Paramount Theaters chain, formerly owned by Paramount Pictures.

The new recording division was located at 1501 Broadway, above the Paramount Theatre in Times Square. Under the leadership of Leonard Goldenson, the former head of Paramount Pictures, the company "sought to establish itself as a cross-media force in television, theaters and sound recordings". It enjoyed early success in TV with The Mickey Mouse Club, a joint venture with Disney.

To market music from the successful TV show, ABC-Paramount established the Am-Par Record Corporation and the ABC-Paramount label in early 1955, appointing Sam Clark, a Boston record distributor, as president, with Larry Newton as sales manager and Harry Levine the A&R director. The new recording company enjoyed Goldenson's full support. Sid Feller, a producer and arranger, was the first salaried employee on July 15, 1955. The label achieved early success in pop music with Paul Anka. A young producer named Creed Taylor, who also worked for a period at Bethlehem Records in 1955, produced some of ABC-Paramount/Am-Par's earliest albums for musicians such as Urbie Green, Billy Taylor, Oscar Pettiford, Kenny Dorham and Zoot Sims.

In 1960, Am-Par established a jazz subsidiary and hired Taylor as producer and A&R manager. He chose the name "Pulse" but then learned there was already a label with that name, so he added a prefix. In the mid-1960s, the headquarters of Impulse! was moved to 1130 Avenue of the Americas.

=== Design ===
Impulse!'s albums are known for their visual appeal. The black, orange, and white livery was devised by Fran Attaway (then known as Fran Scott), whom Taylor also credits with establishing the label's tradition of using cutting-edge photographers for its covers. The color scheme was chosen for its brightness and because no other label used this combination.

The label's logo featured the Impulse! name in a heavy, sans-serif, lower-cased font, followed by an exclamation mark that mirrors the lower-case "i" at the beginning. For most of the 1960s, Impulse!'s album covers featured the logo in orange letters in a white circle, with black-and-orange exclamation marks above it, and the catalog number below it. One exception is the album A Love Supreme, which used the design in black and white. In 1968 the circular front-cover badge was replaced by a one-color design featuring a simplified Impulse! logo and the ABC Records logo side by side within a divided rectangular border.

Album covers often featured stylish, large-format photographs or paintings, usually in color, which were typically bled out to the edges of the cover and printed on glossy laminated stock. Many of the best-known Impulse! covers were designed by art director Robert Flynn and photographed by a small group that included Pete Turner, who shot covers for Verve, A&M, and CTI; Chuck Stewart; Arnold Newman; Ted Russell; and Joe Alper, who was known for his early ’60s photographs of Bob Dylan) The sparse black-and-white back covers bore the slogan "The New Wave of Jazz is on IMPULSE!" Most Impulse! LPs were issued in a gatefold sleeve, with photographs, liner notes, and, in some cases, multi-page booklets.

=== Early success ===
Taylor achieved early success by signing Ray Charles, who had just ended his contract with Atlantic Records. Charles's Genius + Soul = Jazz gave the label its first hit and became the fourth-highest charting album of his career. Other early successes included Out of the Cool by Gil Evans. Taylor also signed John Coltrane.

Another significant early release was The Blues and the Abstract Truth by Oliver Nelson, who led an all-star group that featured Freddie Hubbard, Eric Dolphy, Bill Evans, Paul Chambers, and Roy Haynes. Nelson played an important role in the label's early years before relocating to Los Angeles, where he became an arranger for film and television.

Taylor left Impulse! in the summer of 1961 after being approached by MGM to become the head of Verve Records.

=== The Thiele Years: 1961–69 ===
Bob Thiele, Taylor's successor, produced most of the albums in the 1960s. He had worked for Decca Records and its subsidiaries Coral and Brunswick, where his production credits included Alan Dale, the McGuire Sisters, Pearl Bailey, and Theresa Brewer, whom he married. Despite resistance from Decca executives who were suspicious of rock and roll, Thiele signed Buddy Holly in 1957.

Thiele's first Impulse! production was Coltrane's Live! at the Village Vanguard, released in March 1962. Although unfamiliar with the "new jazz" movement, Thiele backed his artists, afforded them unprecedented freedom in their repertoire, and gave leading acts like Coltrane carte blanche in the studio. Impulse! during the Thiele years is recognized as a key outlet for free jazz and the musical movement spearheaded by Coltrane, Freddie Hubbard, Archie Shepp, and McCoy Tyner. In addition to avant-garde releases, Thiele also produced collaborations between Coltrane and two of their mutual heroes, Duke Ellington and Coleman Hawkins. Other notable performers who recorded for Impulse! during this period included Charles Mingus.

Aided ABC-Paramount's well-established distribution chain and promotion, Coltrane enjoyed a high profile and consistent sales. In addition to its artistic influence, Coltrane's 1965 LP A Love Supreme sold over 100,000 copies on its first release. By 1970 it had sold more than half a million. Roger McGuinn of the Byrds has stated that he listened to Coltrane extensively in this period, and that Coltrane's saxophone playing influenced his 12-string guitar playing on the hit "Eight Miles High".

Thiele severed his ties with Impulse! in 1969, setting up a short-lived deal to provide independently produced recordings, before leaving the label entirely to establish his own imprint, Flying Dutchman Records. Thiele's departure was in part precipitated by the breakdown of his relationship with Larry Newton, the president of ABC Records.

One of Thiele's last productions was the Louis Armstrong song "What a Wonderful World", which Thiele co-wrote and produced for ABC's pop division shortly before Armstrong's death. Although the musicians were apparently unaware of the drama, the recording session is reported to have been the scene of a clash between Thiele and Newton. When Newton arrived at the session he became upset when he discovered that Armstrong was recording a ballad rather than a Dixieland-style number like his earlier hit "Hello Dolly". According to Thiele's own account, this led to a screaming match; Newton then had to be locked out of the studio and he stood outside throughout the session, banging on the door and yelling to be let in. The single was released with little promotion from ABC and it sold relatively poorly in the U.S.. In Europe, it sold more than 1.5 million copies and went to #1 in the UK. Demand from ABC's European distributor EMI for an album forced ABC to issue one, but they did not promote the album and it did not chart in the U.S. Twenty years later, it became the most successful recording of both Armstrong's and Thiele's careers, thanks to its inclusion on the soundtrack Good Morning, Vietnam.

=== The 1970s ===
Under the guidance of Ed Michel, Thiele's successor, Impulse! continued to issue significant recordings. The company also acquired LP masters that Sun Ra had recorded for his private label, making them more widely available for the first time.

In the early 1970s, ABC restructured its recording division, merging the ABC label with its other pop-rock subsidiary, Dunhill Records, whose roster included The Mamas & the Papas, Steppenwolf, Three Dog Night, and The Grass Roots. Impulse! was moved to share headquarters with ABC-Dunhill in Los Angeles. By this time, pop-rock acts dominated the company's output, with Impulse! releases accounting for only 5 percent of total sales. It was also during this time that Impulse! became the first all-jazz label to release a rock album when it issued Trespass, the second album by Genesis, in the U.S. in 1970.

In 1974, ABC acquired the Famous Music labels and catalog from Gulf+Western, and subsequently, that company's jazz recordings were incorporated into the Impulse! catalog. New recordings from the label ceased in the late 1970s, but ABC reissued titles until the company was sold to MCA Records in 1979. The label lay dormant until it was resurrected in 1992 as part of MCA’s GRP Records, during which time the label started releasing important titles that had otherwise been unavailable and began signing new artists during the late 1990s. In 1999, Impulse! became part of Universal Music Group's jazz holdings, under the aegis of the Verve Label Group, where it has remained until the present.
