= Evelyn Knight (singer) =

American singer

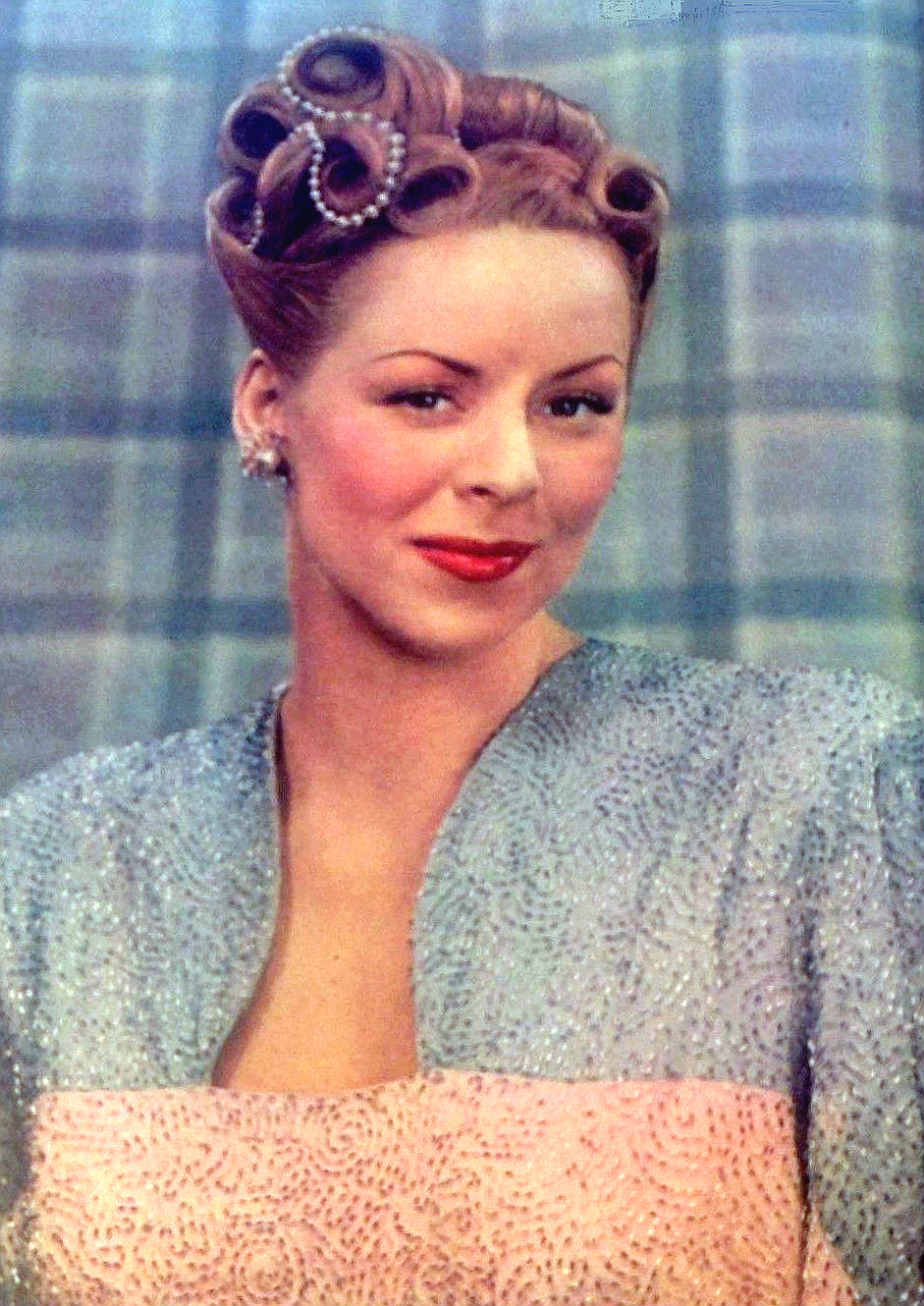
- Born: Evelyn Davis; December 31, 1917; Reedville, Virginia, U.S.
- Died: September 28, 2007 (aged 89); San Jose, California, U.S.
- Occupation: Singer

Evelyn Knight (born Evelyn Davis, December 31, 1917 – September 28, 2007) was an American singer of the 1940s and 1950s. Damon Runyon, in one of his newspaper columns, described Knight as "a lissome blonde lassie with a gentle little voice and a face mother would not mind having brought home to her."

== Early years ==
Knight's father was "head of a geodetic survey for the government". She sang soprano in the young people's choir in a church in her hometown of Reedville, Virginia. After her father's death, Knight and her mother moved to Arlington County, Virginia, in 1926. When she was 16, she sang in Washington nightclubs billed as Honey Davis. At the age of 18, she married Andrew B. Knight, a war photographer for the Washington Post, and became professionally known as Evelyn Knight.

== Recordings ==
During a seven-year span in the late 1940s and 1950, Knight had two No. 1 hit records and 13 that made the Top 40. Her debut recording was "Dance with a Dolly (With a Hole in Her Stocking)" for Decca Records in 1945. It became a Top 10 hit.

In 1948, she recorded the million-seller "A Little Bird Told Me" with The Stardusters, which was number one for seven weeks and stayed on the chart for five months. Later that year she recorded "Powder Your Face with Sunshine"; which also reached number one and remained on the chart into the following year.

She had other hits including "Buttons and Bows" in 1948, which Bob Hope also sang in the film The Paleface. A list of some of her hits appears below. In 1950, she released "Candy and Cake", originally sung by Mindy Carson, and "All Dressed Up to Smile" with the Ray Charles singers. In 1951, she recorded a duet with country singer Red Foley called "My Heart Cries for You", as well as a pair of titles with Bing Crosby.

== Television ==
Knight appeared on The Ed Sullivan Show, The Colgate Comedy Hour and a 1951 television appearance with Abbott & Costello.

== Radio ==
Knight began her career in high school when she would sing at Washington D.C.'s Station WRC as “Honey Davis” twice a week over NBC for $16 a broadcast. Knight was the female vocalist on the Tony Martin Show, which began March 30, 1947. In 1948, she co-starred with Gordon MacRae on Star Theater on CBS. She also was featured on Barry Wood's Million Dollar Band program and starred in a weekly program broadcast over CBS shortwave for Latin America. Knight was also a regular on Club Fifteen, Happy Island, and The Lanny Ross Show.

== Nightclubs ==
One of Knight's early bookings was in the King Cole Room in Washington, D.C. An initial two-week contract eventually turned into a five-year stay. Near the end of that span, a Billboard reviewer wrote, "For five years she has held down the entertainment assignment in this spot and in that five years she has grown into a local tradition ... Cool and with plenty of glamour, this girl delivers her stuff in a sophisticated manner".

Knight moved to New York City, where she began headlining at Manhattan nightclubs the Blue Angel and the Plaza Hotel's Persian Room. She launched her recording career in 1945 by signing with Decca records, and moved to Los Angeles in the late 1940s where she headlined at Ciro's and Coconut Grove.

== Recognition ==
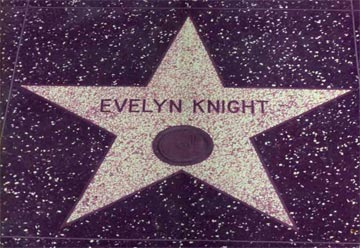
Star on Hollywood Walk of Fame

Knight was among the original 1,500 stars on the Hollywood Walk of Fame. Her star, dedicated February 8, 1960, is at 6136 Hollywood Boulevard, in the "Recording" section. A 1947 newspaper article reported, "She has given three 'command performances' for President Truman."

In 2011, one of Knight's number 1 hits, "A Little Bird Told Me" was featured as a song on the radio in the game, L.A. Noire by Rockstar Games. The song was one of many (appropriate for that era) that would randomly play throughout the game.

A 2018 television advertisement entitled Lucky Guy featured Knight's version of the song "Lucky Lucky Lucky Me". The advertisement promotes the South-Korean automobile manufacturer Hyundai's Tucson car.

== Family ==
Divorced from Knight, she married Johnny Lehmann, a songwriter, in 1951. Her son, Andrew Knight Jr. became a concert tour lighting technician. Her second child, Fran, worked in California radio.

== Last years ==
Knight's obituary in The Washington Post reported, "she abruptly retired from show business in her 30s, never to return to the spotlight." She and her family moved to Phoenix, Arizona in 1969 where she lived until 2007. Following a decline in health in 2007, she moved to San Jose, California to live with her daughter. She died on September 28, 2007, aged 89, from lung cancer.

== Charted singles ==
Year	Single	US Chart
1944	"Dance with a Dolly (With a Hole in Her Stocking)"	6
1945	"Chickery Chick"	10
1948	"A Little Bird Told Me"	1
1948	"Brush Those Tears from Your Eyes"	9
1948	"Buttons and Bows"	14
1948	"Powder Your Face with Sunshine (Smile! Smile! Smile!)"	1
1949	"You're So Understanding"	21
1949	"It's Too Late Now"	22
1949	"A Wonderful Guy"	22
1949	"Be Goody Good Good to Me"	29
1950	"Candy and Cake"	20
1950	"All Dressed Up to Smile"	25
1950	"Lucky, Lucky, Lucky Me"	
1951	"My Heart Cries for You"	28
