= Derby Records =

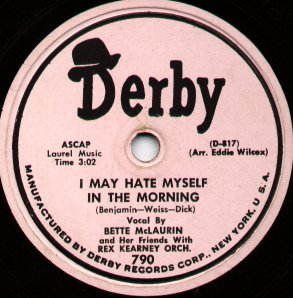
- Founded: 1949
- Founder: Larry Newton
- Defunct: 1964
- Status: Defunct
- Genre: Various
- Country of origin: U.S.
- Location: New York City

Derby Records was an independent record label founded by Larry Newton in 1949.

The label's logo featured a Derby hat. First headquartered in New York City, it moved to Los Angeles shortly before going out of business in 1964. The label offered selections in various styles of pop music of the era, including jazz, rhythm and blues, and Western swing.

Derby recording artists included singer Mel Carter, saxophonist Freddie Mitchell, singer and session artist Billy Preston, and Vann "Piano Man" Walls. Singer Jaye P. Morgan made her recording debut for Derby in 1950. Sunny Gale had a hit for Derby in 1952 with "Wheel of Fortune", which reached No. 13 and sold c. 50,000 copies.

== See also ==
- List of record labels
