= Jack McVea =

American jazz musician (1914–2000)

- Born: John Vivian McVea; November 5, 1914; Los Angeles, California, United States
- Died: December 27, 2000 (aged 86) Los Angeles, California, United States
- Genres: Swing; blues; R&B; Dixieland
- Occupations: Saxophonist, bandleader
- Years active: 1930s–1992

John Vivian McVea (November 5, 1914 – December 27, 2000) was an American swing, blues, and rhythm and blues woodwind player and bandleader. He played clarinet and tenor and baritone saxophone.

== Career ==
Born in Los Angeles, California, his father was the noted banjoist Satchel McVea, and banjo was Jack McVea's first instrument. He played jazz in Los Angeles for several years, and joined Lionel Hampton's orchestra in 1940. From 1944 on he mostly worked as a leader. He performed at the first Jazz at the Philharmonic concert in 1944.

Jack Mc Vea played at the famed Cavalcade of Jazz concert held at Wrigley Field in Los Angeles produced by Leon Hefflin Sr. on October 12, 1946. Lionel Hampton and his Orchestra, Slim Gaillard, T-Bone Walker, The Honeydrippers, Madaline Green, Winnie Brown, Reathis Stevens, Joan Benson and Louis Armstrong were all on the same program.

McVea was leader of the Black & White Records studio band and was responsible for coming up with the musical riff for the words "Open the Door, Richard". Ralph Bass persuaded him to record it in 1946 and it became immensely popular, entering the national charts the following year, and was recorded by many other artists.

From 1966 until his retirement in 1992, he led the Royal Street Bachelors, a group that played Dixieland jazz in New Orleans Square at Disneyland. The trio consisted of McVea on clarinet, Herb Gordy on string bass, Harold Grant and later Ernie McLean on guitar and banjo. According to McVea, he was not much of a clarinetist but learned overnight to play three songs to secure the job.

He is also known for his playing on T-Bone Walker's "Call It Stormy Monday (But Tuesday Is Just As Bad)". In 1945 he played tenor sax in a recording session for Slim Gaillard with Charlie Parker and Dizzy Gillespie.

McVea died at home in Los Angeles in 2000.

== Discography ==
As leader/co-leader

Most of Jack McVea's recordings are available on Blue Moon Records in Barcelona, Spain; Ace Records in London, England; and Delmark Records in Chicago. All are available in the U.S. Blue Moon covers the Black & White years (including "Open the Door, Richard"), Delmark covers his sessions on Apollo Records, and Ace covers his four years with Combo Records. Ace's Fortissimo! CD contains several alternate takes.

=== LP compilations ===
- Open The Door, Richard [rec. 1945–1947] (Jukebox Lil 607, 1984)
- Two Timin' Baby [rec. 1944–1947] (Jukebox Lil 612, 1986)
- New Deal [rec. 1944–1948] (Jukebox Lil 625, 1988)

=== CD compilations ===
- The Complete Recordings, Vol. 1 (1944–1945) (Blue Moon 6031, 2002)
- The Complete Recordings, Vol. 2 (1945–1946) (Blue Moon 6032, 2002)
- The Complete Recordings, Vol. 3 (1946–1947) (Blue Moon 6033, 2002)
- The Complete Recordings, Vol. 4 (1947–1952) (Blue Moon 6034, 2002)
- McVoutie's Central Avenue Blues [McVea's 1945 Apollo recordings] (Delmark 756, 2002)
- Honk! Honk! Honk! [contains 9 of McVea's Combo recordings from 1954 to 1957] (Ace 781, 2000)
- Fortissimo! The Combo Recordings (1954-1957) (Ace 1246, 2010)
- Rarely Was Honkin' Sax So Much Fun: Jack McVea with Alton Redd and George Vann (JSP 77159, 2012) 4-CD set

As sideman
With B.B. King

- Singin' the Blues (Crown, 1956)
