= Shifty Henry =

American musician and songwriter (1921–1958)

John Willie "Shifty" Henry (4 October 1921 – 30 November 1958) was an American musician, double bass and bass guitar player, and blues songwriter. He also played flute, violin, viola, saxophone, and oboe and was in demand as a session musician and arranger in Los Angeles in the 1940s and 1950s. He was also active in Los Angeles' live jazz scene on Central Avenue.

== Career ==
Born in Edna, Texas, Henry received a degree in music from the Prairie View A&M University near Houston, Texas. He played center on the football team, and the football coach gave him his nickname for his speed and agility. He generally performed and recorded as Shifty Henry, but he used a number of transparent pseudonyms for songwriting and producing, including Baron Von Shifte, Esq., Shifte Henri, Shifte' Henre, S. Henry, and Shifti Henri.

His best known song is "Let Me Go Home, Whiskey", which was a hit in the early 1950s for Amos Milburn, was later revived by Asleep at the Wheel, and later performed by Jerre Maynard and his Greazy Gravy Blues Band. Another Henry song, "Hypin' Women Blues", recorded in 1945 for the Enterprise label, later recorded by T-Bone Walker in 1947 for the Black & White label was sampled by DJ Mr. Scruff for his song "Get a Move On", which was used in several TV commercials. This led to a revival of interest in Henry's compositions.

Henry recorded with and arranged for the elite of jazz and rhythm and blues, including Dinah Washington, Billy Eckstine, Dizzy Gillespie, Charles Mingus, The Treniers, Illinois Jacquet, and Miles Davis. Henry maintained strong social as well as professional relations throughout the city and the music industry. The Shifty Henry All-Stars played regularly at New Year's Eve balls thrown by socialite Dorothy Chandler and her husband Otis, publisher of the Los Angeles Times.

He is mentioned by name in a verse of "Jailhouse Rock" by Jerry Leiber and Mike Stoller: "Shifty Henry said to Bugs, for heaven's sake, no one's looking, now's a chance to make a break."

Leo Fender selected Henry to receive an early electric Fender Precision Bass, and Henry ("Shifte Henri") appears in a 1954 Fender advertisement. Henry appeared in the film noir movie, D.O.A. in 1950 as a string bass player in a jazz club. He also played in the house band for the Martin and Lewis television show.

He died in Los Angeles at the age of 37. In 2014 the Killer Blues Headstone Project placed a headstone for John Willie Henry in Paradise Memorial Cemetery in Santee, California.
