= Marion Morgan (singer) =

American jazz musician

Marion Morgan (born Marion Swires; December 14, 1923 – October 21, 2013) was an American vocalist who sang with big band leader Harry James.

== Career ==
Born in Detroit, Michigan, Morgan was billed as Lee Barrie when she sang on the Pacific Coast. She changed her name at the suggestion of bandleader Russ Morgan.

Morgan had a 15-minute Monday to Friday morning program on WMGM radio in New York City in 1951. A review in the trade publication Billboard said that she "exhibited a professional adequacy but little more" on the show. Radio-TV Mirror magazine reported in its May 1952 issue that she "has been concentrating on night-club dates and has been playing the supper club circuit around the country."

In the 1960s, Morgan was "hostess-singer-interviewer" for the Panorama Pacific program on KNXT in Los Angeles, California.

== Personal life ==
While performing with Harry James, Marion Morgan fell in love with Sidney "Sid" J. Beller (1913–1991), the band's road manager, who decided to leave his job just before Morgan left in 1949. Beller and Morgan were married in Las Vegas on October 7, 1949. They had two children: Jay Howard Beller, born November 21, 1957, and Julie Lenore Beller.

== Selected discography ==
- "White Christmas" - with Harry James (Columbia), 1946
- "Heartaches" - with Harry James (Columbia), 1947
