= 1949 in music =

This is a list of notable events in music that took place in the year 1949.

== Specific locations ==
- 1949 in British music
- 1949 in Norwegian music

== Specific genres ==
- 1949 in country music
- 1949 in jazz

== Events ==
- January 12 – Maro Ajemian, to whom the work is dedicated, gives one of the first performances of the complete cycle of John Cage's Sonatas and Interludes at Carnegie Hall.
- February 4 – Ljuba Welitsch makes her Metropolitan Opera début in Salome.
- February 11 – London Mozart Players give their first concert, at the Wigmore Hall.
- April – Goree Carter records "Rock Awhile", which is considered to be the first rock and roll record.
- June 25 – The Philharmonic Piano Quartet make their New York City debut at Lewisohn Stadium
- September 5 – English Wagnerian tenor Walter Widdop appears at The Proms, singing "Lohengrin's Farewell", the day before his sudden death at the age of 51.
- December 15 – Birdland jazz club opens in New York City.
- December 24 – At the start of the Holy Year, Charles Gounod's Inno e Marcia Pontificale is adopted as the new papal anthem.
- December 29 – Les Paul and Mary Ford marry.
- The Boccherini Quintet is formed in Rome.
- Ravi Shankar becomes music director of All India Radio.
- Mitch Miller begins his career as one of the 20th century's most successful record producers at Mercury
- Eddie Fisher is "discovered" by Eddie Cantor and signs with RCA.
- Bob Hope suggests that Anthony Benedetto change his stage name from "Joe Bari" to "Tony Bennett"
- Frankie Laine records "Mule Train", considered by some critics as marking the beginning of the rock era.
- Teresa Brewer makes her first recording on the London label.
- The Ames Brothers become the first artists to record for Coral Records, a subsidiary of Decca.
- Johnnie Ray performs at the Flame Showbar in Detroit.
- The legendary Al Jolson records the soundtrack to "Jolson Sings Again," the sequel to his hugely successful biopic "The Jolson Story" (1946)
- 45 rpm discs are introduced
- Gorni Kramer starts working for musical impresarios Garinei and Giovannini.
- Country singer Bill Haley enters into a partnership with musicians Johnny Grande and Billy Williamson to form Bill Haley and His Saddlemen; in 1952 the group is renamed Bill Haley & His Comets.
- The International Rostrum of Composers is founded.

== Albums released ==
- Goree Carter – Rock Awhile
- Der Bingle – Bing Crosby
- Jerome Kern Songs – Bing Crosby
- Merry Christmas – Bing Crosby
- Stephen Foster Songs – Bing Crosby
- Lights, Cameras, Action – Doris Day
- You're My Thrill – Doris Day
- Frankie Laine – Frankie Laine
- Frankie Laine Favorites – Frankie Laine
- Songs from the Heart – Frankie Laine
- The Return of the Wayfaring Stranger – Burl Ives
- Dinah Shore – Dinah Shore
- Jo Stafford with Gordon MacRae – Jo Stafford & Gordon MacRae

== US No. 1 hit singles ==
These singles reached the top of the US charts in 1949.

| First week | Number of weeks | Title | Artist |
|---|---|---|---|
| January 8, 1949 | 1 | "All I Want for Christmas Is My Two Front Teeth" | Spike Jones |
| January 15, 1949 | 1 | "Buttons and Bows" | Dinah Shore |
| January 22, 1949 | 7 | "A Little Bird Told Me" | Evelyn Knight |
| March 12, 1949 | 2 | "Cruising Down the River" | Blue Barron |
| March 26, 1949 | 7 | "Cruising Down the River" | Russ Morgan |
| May 14, 1949 | 11 | "(Ghost) Riders in the Sky: A Cowboy Legend" | Vaughn Monroe |
| July 30, 1949 | 5 | "Some Enchanted Evening" | Perry Como |
| September 3, 1949 | 4 | "You're Breaking My Heart" | Vic Damone |
| October 1, 1949 | 8 | "That Lucky Old Sun" | Frankie Laine |
| November 26, 1949 | 6 | "Mule Train" | Frankie Laine |

== Top popular records ==
Before the Hot100 was implemented in 1958, Billboard magazine measured a record's performance with three charts, 'Best-Selling Popular Retail Records', 'Records Most Played By Disk Jockeys' and 'Most-Played Juke Box Records'. We use the same data, with several modifications. Having no commercial deadlines, year-end data does not end December 31, chart-runs are ever truncated, and every hit song has a year to call home. With few exceptions, records included entered the charts between November 1948 and December 1949. Each week fifteen points were awarded to the number one record, then nine points for number two, eight points for number three, and so on. This system rewards songs that reach the highest positions, as well as those that had the longest chart runs. Each record's three point totals are combined, with that number determining the year-end rank. Number of weeks at number one or total weeks on the chart do not include duplicates; if a record was #1 on all 3 charts on July 15, that counts as one week, not three. Additional information from other sources is reported, but not used for ranking. This includes dates from the "Discography of American Historical Recordings" website, cross-over information from R&B and Country charts, 'Cashbox', and other sources as noted.

| Rank | Artist | Title | Label | Recorded | Released | Chart positions |
|---|---|---|---|---|---|---|
| 1 | Vaughn Monroe and His Orchestra | "Riders in the Sky (A Cowboy Legend)" | RCA Victor 20-3411 | March 14, 1949 | May 14, 1949 | US Billboard 1949 #1, US #1 for 12 weeks, 22 total weeks, US Country 1949 #43, USHB #2 for 1 weeks, 3 total weeks, 627 points, CashBox #1 |
| 2 | Frankie Laine | "That Lucky Old Sun" | Mercury 5316 | June 14, 1949 | August 19, 1949 | US Billboard 1949 #2, US #1 for 8 weeks, 22 total weeks, 510 points, CashBox #4 |
| 3 | The Andrews Sisters with Gordon Jenkins Orchestra | "I Can Dream, Can't I?" | Decca 24705 | July 15, 1949 | August 22, 1949 | US Billboard 1949 #3, US #1 for 5 weeks, 25 total weeks, 496 points |
| 4 | Evelyn Knight | "A Little Bird Told Me" | Decca 24514 | October 12, 1948 | November 1948 | US Billboard 1949 #4, US #1 for 7 weeks, 21 total weeks, 473 points, CashBox #8 |
| 5 | Perry Como | "Some Enchanted Evening" | RCA Victor 20-3402 | March 1, 1949 | April 1949 | US Billboard 1949 #7, US #1 for 5 weeks, 26 total weeks, 468 points, CashBox #2 |
| 6 | Vic Damone | "You're Breaking My Heart" | Mercury 5271 | February 15, 1949 | May 1949 | US Billboard 1949 #6, US #1 for 4 weeks, 26 total weeks, 467 points, CashBox #7 |
| 7 | Margaret Whiting and Jimmy Wakely | "Slippin' Around" | Capitol 40224 | September 5, 1949 | September 10, 1949 | US Billboard 1949 #10, US #1 for 3 weeks, 23 total weeks, US Country 1949 #2, USHB #1 for 16 weeks, 32 total weeks, 428 points |
| 8 | Blue Barron and His Orchestra | "Cruising Down the River" | MGM 10346 | December 15, 1948 | January 1949 | US Billboard 1949 #8, US #1 for 7 weeks, 20 total weeks, 409 points, CashBox #5 |
| 9 | Frankie Laine | "Mule Train" | Mercury 5345 | October 2, 1949 | October 28, 1949 | US Billboard 1949 #6, US #1 for 6 weeks, 13 total weeks, 385 points, CashBox #9 |
| 10 | Russ Morgan and His Orchestra | "Cruising Down The River" | Decca 24568 | January 20, 1949 | February 1949 | US Billboard 1949 #10, US #1 for 7 weeks, 22 total weeks, 360 points, CashBox #3 |
| 11 | Gordon Jenkins and His Orchestra | "Again" | Decca 24602 | February 17, 1949 | April 1949 | US Billboard 1949 #11, US #2 for 3 weeks, 23 total weeks, 295 points |
| 12 | Vaughn Monroe and His Orchestra | "Someday (You'll Want Me To Want You)" | RCA Victor 20-3510 | July 1949 | August 1, 1949 | US Billboard 1949 #12, US #1 for 2 weeks, 18 total weeks, 287 points |
| 13 | Russ Morgan and His Orchestra | "Forever and Ever" | Decca 24569 | January 20, 1949 | February 1949 | US Billboard 1949 #13, US #1 for 3 weeks, 26 total weeks, 263 points |
| 14 | Perry Como | "Forever and Ever" | RCA Victor 20-3347 | January 13, 1949 | March 1949 | US Billboard 1949 #14, US #2 for 1 weeks, 25 total weeks, 245 points |
| 15 | Swing And Sway With Sammy Kaye (Vocal Don Cornell) | "Room Full of Roses" | RCA Victor 20-3441 | March 8, 1949 | May 1949 | US Billboard 1949 #15, US #2 for 1 weeks, 24 total weeks, 220 points |
| 16 | Evelyn Knight | "Powder Your Face with Sunshine" | Decca 24530 | November 16, 1948 | December 1948 | US Billboard 1949 #16, US #1 for 1 week, 20 total weeks, 208 points |
| 17 | Gordon Jenkins and His Orchestra | "Don't Cry, Joe (Let Her Go, Let Her Go, Let Her Go)" | Decca 24720 | August 12, 1949 | September 1949 | US Billboard 1949 #17, US #3 for 1 week, 19 total weeks, 181 points |
| 18 | Bing Crosby | "Far Away Places" | Decca 24532 | November 25, 1948 | January 5, 1949 | US Billboard 1949 #18, US #2 for 3 weeks, 19 total weeks, 171 points |
| 19 | Al Morgan | "Jealous Heart" | London 30001 | 1949 | July 1949 | US Billboard 1949 #19, US #4 for 5 weeks, 26 total weeks, 166 points |
| 20 | Margaret Whiting | "Far Away Places" | Capitol 15278 | October 1, 1948 | November 1948 | US Billboard 1949 #20, US #2 for 6 weeks, 23 total weeks, 152 points |
| 21 | Russ Morgan | "So Tired" | Decca 24521 | October 11, 1945 | November 1948 | US Billboard 1949 #21, US #3 for 1 weeks, 25 total weeks, 146 points |
| 22 | Perry Como and the Fontane Sisters | ""A" – You're Adorable (The Alphabet Song)" | RCA Victor 20-3381 | March 1, 1949 | March 25, 1949 | US Billboard 1949 #22, US #1 for 2 weeks, 15 total weeks, 144 points |
| 23 | Vaughn Monroe and His Orchestra | "Red Roses for a Blue Lady" | RCA Victor 20-3319 | December 15, 1948 | January 1949 | US Billboard 1949 #23, US #3 for 2 weeks, 22 total weeks, 131 points |
| 24 | Perry Como and the Fontane Sisters | "A Dreamer's Holiday" | RCA Victor 20-3543 | August 11, 1949 | September 12, 1949 | US Billboard 1949 #24, US #3 for 1 week, 19 total weeks, 118 points |
| 25 | Bing Crosby | "Mule Train" | Decca 24798 | October 26, 1949 | November 12, 1949 | US Billboard 1949 #25, US #4 for 2 weeks, 12 total weeks, 109 points |
| 40 | Gene Autry and the Pinafores | "Rudolph, the Red-Nosed Reindeer" | Columbia 38610 | June 27, 1949 | September 1, 1949 | US Billboard 1949 #40, US #1 for 1 week, 6 total weeks, US Country 1949 #25, USHB #1 for 4 weeks, 5 total weeks, 55 points, Grammy Hall of Fame 1985, 7,000,000 sold by 1969 |
| 248 | Gene Autry | "Here Comes Santa Claus (Right Down Santa Claus Lane)" | Columbia 20377 | August 28, 1947 | November 7, 1949 | US Billboard 1949 #248, US #24 for 1 week, 1 total weeks, US Country 1949 #61, USHB #8 for 1 week, 3 total weeks, 3 points, 1,000,000 sales |

== Top R&B and country hit records ==
- Don't Rob Another Man's Castle performed by Eddy Arnold; words and music by Jenny Lou Carson
- The Fat Man, by Fats Domino, first record with back beat all the way through
- My Bucket's Got a Hole in It by Hank Williams and later by T. Texas Tyler
- "When Things Go Wrong With You (It Hurts Me Too)" by Tampa Red, later covered by Elmore James among others

== Published popular music ==
- "Again", words: Dorcas Cochran, music: Lionel Newman
- "Bali Ha'i" w. Oscar Hammerstein II m. Richard Rodgers introduced by Juanita Hall in the musical South Pacific
- "Beyond the Reef" w.m. Jack Pitman
- "Blame My Absent-Minded Heart" w. Sammy Cahn m. Jule Styne
- "Bloody Mary" w. Oscar Hammerstein II m. Richard Rodgers from the musical South Pacific
- "Blue Ribbon Gal" Irwin Dash & Ross Parker
- "Bluebird on Your Windowsill" w.m. Elizabeth Clarke & Robert Mellin
- "Bonaparte's Retreat" w.m. Pee Wee King
- "Bye Bye Baby" w. Leo Robin m. Jule Styne introduced by Carol Channing and Jack McCauley in the musical Gentlemen Prefer Blondes. Performed in the film version by Marilyn Monroe.
- "Cafe Mozart Waltz" m. Anton Karas played by Karas on the soundtrack of the film The Third Man.
- "Clopin Clopant" Bruno Coquatrix, Pierre Dudan & Kermit Goell
- "A Cock-Eyed Optimist" w. Oscar Hammerstein II m. Richard Rodgers introduced by Mary Martin in the musical South Pacific. Mitzi Gaynor sang it in the film version.
- "Count Every Star" w. Sammy Gallop m. Bruno Coquatrix
- "Crazy, He Calls Me" w. Bob Russell m. Carl Sigman
- "Daddy's Little Girl" w.m. Bobby Burke & Horace Gerlach
- "Dear Hearts and Gentle People" w. Bob Hilliard m. Sammy Fain
- "Diamonds Are A Girl's Best Friend" w. Leo Robin m. Jule Styne. Introduced by Carol Channing in the musical Gentlemen Prefer Blondes. Marilyn Monroe performed the number in the film version.
- "Did You See Jackie Robinson Hit That Ball?" w.m. Buddy Johnson
- "Dirty Old Town" w.m. Ewan MacColl
- "Dites-Moi" w. Oscar Hammerstein II m. Richard Rodgers introduced by Michael de Leon and Barbara Luna in the musical South Pacific
- "Don't Cry, Joe (Let Her Go, Let Her Go, Let Her Go)" w.m. Joe Marsala
- "A Dream Is A Wish Your Heart Makes" w.m. Mack David, Al Hoffman & Jerry Livingston. Ilene Woods provided the vocal for the animated film Cinderella.
- "A Dreamer's Holiday" w. Kim Gannon m. Mabel Wayne
- "Enjoy Yourself (It's Later than You Think)" w. Herb Magidson m. Carl Sigman
- "The Fat Man" w. Antoine Domino m. Dave Bartholomew
- "The Four Winds And The Seven Seas" w. Hal David m. Don Rodney
- "Happy Talk" w. Oscar Hammerstein II m. Richard Rodgers introduced by Juanita Hall in the musical South Pacific.
- "He's a Real Gone Guy" w.m. Nellie Lutcher
- "Homework" w.m. Irving Berlin
- "Honey Bun" w. Oscar Hammerstein II m. Richard Rodgers. Introduced by Mary Martin in the musical South Pacific. Performed in the 1958 film version by Mitzi Gaynor.
- "Hop-Scotch Polka" w.m. William "Billy" Whitlock, Carl Sigman & Gene Rayburn
- "The Horse Told Me" w. Johnny Burke m. Jimmy Van Heusen introduced by Bing Crosby in the film Riding High.
- "How Can You Buy Killarney?" Hamilton Kennedy, Ted Steels, Freddie Grant (Grundland) & Gerard Morrison
- "How It Lies, How It Lies, How It Lies!" w. Paul Francis Webster m. Sonny Burke
- "The Hucklebuck" w. Roy Alfred m. Andy Gibson
- "Hymne à l'amour" w. Édith Piaf m. Marguerite Monnot
- "I Didn't Know the Gun Was Loaded" w.m. Hank Fort & Herb Leighton
- "I Don't See Me in Your Eyes Anymore" w.m. Bennie Benjamin & George David Weiss
- "I Love You Because" w.m. Leon Payne
- "I Said My Pajamas" w.m. Edward Pola & George Wyle
- "I'm Gonna Wash That Man Right Outa My Hair" w. Oscar Hammerstein II m. Richard Rodgers introduced by Mary Martin in the musical South Pacific.
- "I'm So Lonesome I Could Cry" w.m. Hank Williams
- "It's a Great Feeling" w. Sammy Cahn m. Jule Styne introduced by Doris Day in the film It's a Great Feeling
- "It's So Nice to Have a Man Around The House" w. John Elliot m. Harold Spina
- "Just One Way to Say I Love You" w.m. Irving Berlin introduced by Eddie Albert and Allyn Ann McLerie in the musical Miss Liberty.
- "Let's Take An Old Fashioned Walk" w.m. Irving Berlin introduced by Eddie Albert and Allyn Ann McLerie in the musical Miss Liberty
- "A Little Girl from Little Rock" w. Leo Robin m. Jule Styne introduced by Carol Channing in the musical Gentlemen Prefer Blondes. Jane Russell and Marilyn Monroe were just two little girls in the film version.
- "Lush Life" w.m. Billy Strayhorn
- "Maybe It's Because" w. Harry Ruby m. Johnnie Scott
- "Melodie d'Amour" w.(Eng) Leo Johns m. Henri Salvador
- "Mona Lisa" w.m. Ray Evans & Jay Livingston
- "Mule Train" w.m. Johnny Lange, Hy Heath & Fred Glickman
- "Music! Music! Music!" w.m. Stephen Weiss & Bernie Baum
- "My Foolish Heart" w. Ned Washington m. Victor Young introduced by Susan Hayward in the film My Foolish Heart
- "My One and Only Highland Fling" w. Ira Gershwin m. Harry Warren introduced by Fred Astaire and Ginger Rogers in the film The Barkleys of Broadway.
- "Now That I Need You" w.m. Frank Loesser introduced by Betty Hutton in the film Red, Hot and Blue.
- "The Old Master Painter" w. Haven Gillespie m. Beasley Smith
- "Paris Wakes up and Smiles" w.m. Irving Berlin introduced by Johnny V. R. Thompson and Allyn Ann McLerie in the musical Miss Liberty
- "Peter Cottontail" w.m. Jack Rollins & Steve Nelson
- "Pigalle" w.m. Georges Konyn, Charles Newman & Georges Ulmer
- "Portrait of Jennie" w. Gordon Burge m. J. Russell Robinson
- "Quicksilver" w.m. Irving Taylor, George Wyle & Edward Pola
- "Rag Mop" w.m. Johnnie Lee Wills & Deacon Anderson
- "(Ghost) Riders in the Sky: A Cowboy Legend" w.m. Stan Jones
- "The Right Girl for Me" w. Betty Comden & Adolph Green m. Roger Edens introduced by Frank Sinatra in the film Take Me Out to the Ball Game
- "The River Seine" w. (Eng) Allan Roberts & Alan Holt m. Guy La Forge
- "Rudolph, The Red Nosed Reindeer" w.m. Johnny Marks
- "Saturday Night Fish Fry" w.m. Louis Jordan, Ellis Walsh & Al Carters
- "Scarlet Ribbons" w. Jack Segal m. Evelyn Danzig
- "La Seine" w. Geoffrey Parsons m. Berkeley Fase
- "Sentimental Me" w.m. James T. Morehead & James Cassin
- "Sing Soft, Sing Sweet, Sing Gentle" w.m. Jimmy Durante & Jack Barnett
- "Slippin' Around" w.m. Floyd Tillman
- "Some Day My Heart Will Awake" w. Christopher Hassall m. Ivor Novello. Introduced by Vanessa Lee in the musical King's Rhapsody.
- "Some Enchanted Evening" w. Oscar Hammerstein II m. Richard Rodgers introduced by Ezio Pinza in the musical South Pacific. Giorgio Tozzi dubbed for Rossano Brazzi in the film.
- "A Strawberry Moon (In A Blueberry Sky)" Bob Hilliard & Sammy Mysels
- "Sunshine Cake" w. Johnny Burke m. Jimmy Van Heusen
- "Swamp Girl" w.m. Michael Brown
- "That Lucky Old Sun" w. Haven Gillespie m. Beasley Smith
- "There Is Nothin' Like a Dame" w. Oscar Hammerstein II m. Richard Rodgers from the musical South Pacific.
- "Third Man Theme" m. Anton Karas played by Karas on the soundtrack of the film The Third Man. Also known as "The Harry Lime Theme".
- "This Nearly Was Mine" w. Oscar Hammerstein II m. Richard Rodgers introduced by Ezio Pinza in the musical South Pacific. Giorgio Tozzi dubbed for Rossano Brazzi in the film.
- "Through a Long and Sleepless Night" w. Mack Gordon m. Alfred Newman
- "Too-Whit! Too-Whoo!" Billy Reid
- "Twenty-Four Hours of Sunshine" w. Carl Sigman m. Peter De Rose
- "Up Above My Head" w.m. Sister Rosetta Tharpe
- "The Wedding Of Lili Marlene" w.m. Tommie Connor & Johnny Reine
- "A Wonderful Guy" w. Oscar Hammerstein II m. Richard Rodgers introduced by Mary Martin in the musical South Pacific
- "You Can Have Him" w.m. Irving Berlin from the musical Miss Liberty
- "Younger Than Springtime" w. Oscar Hammerstein II m. Richard Rodgers introduced by William Tabbert in the musical South Pacific
- "You've Got to Be Carefully Taught" w. Oscar Hammerstein II m. Richard Rodgers introduced by William Tabbert in the musical South Pacific

== Classical music ==
=== Premieres ===
| Composer | Composition | Date | Location | Performers |
|---|---|---|---|---|
| Barber, Samuel | Piano Sonata | 1949-12-09 | Havana, Cuba | Horowitz |
| Bartók, Béla | Viola Concerto (1945) | 1949-12-02 | Minneapolis | Primrose / Minneapolis Symphony – Dorati |
| Bernstein, Leonard | The Age of Anxiety (Symphony No. 2) | 1949-04-08 | Boston | Bernstein / Boston Symphony – Koussevitzky |
| Britten, Benjamin | Spring Symphony | 1949-07-09 | Amsterdam (Holland Festival) | Vincent, Ferrier, Pears / Netherlands Radio Choir, Concertgebouw Orchestra – Van Beinum |
| Bush, Alan | Nottingham Symphony (Symphony No. 2) | 1949-06-27 | Nottingham, UK | London Philharmonic – Ellenberg |
| Carter, Elliott | Wind Quintet | 1949-02-27 | New York City | Orenstein, Abosch, Paul, Bobo, Popkin |
| Copland, Aaron | Preamble for a Solemn Occasion | 1949-12-19 | New York City | Olivier / Boston Symphony – Bernstein |
| Cowell, Henry | Symphony No. 5 (1948) | 1949-01-05 | Washington DC | USA National Symphony – Kindler |
| Delius, Frederick | Summer Evening; Winter Night; Spring Morning (1890) | 1949-01-02 | London | [unknown orchestra] – Beecham |
| Dello Joio, Norman | Concertante for Clarinet and Orchestra | 1949-05-22 | Chautauqua, New York | Shaw / Chautauqua Symphony – Autori |
| Egge, Klaus | Sinfonia giocosa (Symphony No. 2) (1947) | 1949-07-09 | Oslo | [unknown orchestra] – Grüner-Hegge |
| Einem, Gottfried von | Orchestral Suite from Dantons Tod | 1949-02-09 | Baden-Baden, Germany | SWF Symphony – Rosbaud |
| Enescu, George | Romanian Concert Overture (1948) | 1949-01-23 | Washington DC | USA National Symphony – Enescu |
| Ghedini, Giorgio Federico | Concerto funebre in memoria di Duccio Galimberti (1948) | 1949-03-02 | Rome | Accademia di Santa Cecilia Orchestra – Rossi |
| Ginastera, Alberto | Ollantay (1947) | 1949-10-29 | Buenos Aires | Teatro Colón Regular Orchestra – E. Kleiber |
| Ginastera, Alberto | String Quartet No. 1 (1948) | 1949-10-24 | Buenos Aires | Mozart Quartet |
| Glinka, Mikhail | String Quartet (1824) | 1949-02-27 | Moscow | Beethoven Quartet |
| Harris, Roy | Kentucky Spring | 1949-04-05 | Louisville, US | Louisville Philharmonic – Whitney |
| Henze, Hans Werner | Apollo und Hyazintus | 1949-06-26 | Frankfurt | Plümacher, Picht-Axenfeld / Members of the HR Symphony – Henze |
| Henze, Hans Werner | Ballett-Variationen | 1949-09-26 | Düsseldorf | NWDR Symphony – Romansky |
| Henze, Hans Werner | Chor gefangener Trojer (1948) | 1949-02-06 | Bielefeld, Germany | Bieleld Musikverein Choir, Stadtorchester Bielefeld – Hoffmann |
| Henze, Hans Werner | Symphony No. 2 | 1949-12-01 | Stuttgart | SDR Radio Symphony – Müller-Kray |
| Henze, Hans Werner | Variations for Piano | 1949-06-17 | Frankfurt | Kaul |
| Hindemith, Paul | Concerto for Woodwinds, Harp and Orchestra | 1949-05-15 | New York City | CBS Symphony – Johnson |
| Honegger, Arthur | Concerto da camera | 1949-05-06 | Zürich | Jaunet, Saillet / Collegium Musicum Zürich – Sacher |
| Howells, Herbert | Music for a Prince (1948) | 1949-01-23 | London | BBC Symphony – Sargent |
| Jolivet, André | Étude sur les modes antiques (1944) | 1949-06-09 | Paris | Haloua |
| Jolivet, André | Symphonic Suite from Guignol et Pandore (1943) | 1949-12-11 | Paris | Colonne Orchestra – Fourestier |
| Landowski, Marcel | Jean de la Peur (Symphony No. 1) | 1949-04-03 | Paris | Pasdeloup Orchestra – Wolff |
| Lutosławski, Witold | Overture for Strings | 1949-11-09 | Prague | Prague Radio Symphony – Fitelberg |
| Malipiero, Gian Francesco | Mondi celesti (1947) | 1949-02-03 | Capri, Italy | [unknown ensemble] – Giulini |
| Malipiero, Gian Francesco | Sinfonia degli archi (Symphony No. 6) | 1949-02-11 | Basel | Basel Chamber Orchestra – Sacher |
| Martinů, Bohuslav | Piano Concerto No. 3 | 1949-11-20 | Dallas | Firkusny / Dallas Symphony – Hendl |
| Mennin, Peter | The Cycle (Symphony No. 4) | 1949-03-18 | New York City | Collegiate Chorale, New York Philharmonic – Shaw |
| Messiaen, Olivier | Turangalîla-Symphonie (1948) | 1949-12-02 | Boston | Loriod, Martenot / Boston Symphony – Bernstein |
| Milhaud, Darius | Concerto for Marimba and Vibraphone | 1949-02-12 | St. Louis, US | Connor / St. Louis Symphony – Golschmann |
| Milhaud, Darius | Kentuckiana (1948) | 1949-01-04 | Louisville, US | Louisville Orchestra – Whitney |
| Myaskovsky, Nikolai | Cello Sonata No. 2 | 1949-03-05 | Moscow | Rostropovich, Dedyukhin |
| Nystroem, Gösta | Sinfonia del mare (Symphony No. 3) (1948) | 1949-03-24 | Gothenburg, Sweden | Eksell / Gothenburg Symphony – Eckerberg |
| Ohana, Maurice | La venta encantada (1940) | 1949-04-29 | Paris | Girard Orchestra – Girard |
| Panufnik, Andrzej | Sinfonia rustica (Symphony No. 1) (1948) | 1949-05-13 | Warsaw | Warsaw Philharmonic – Panufnik |
| Poulenc, Francis | Cello Sonata (1948) | 1949-05-18 | Paris | Fournier, Poulenc |
| Rubbra, Edmund | Symphony No. 5 (1947) | 1949-01-26 | London | BBC Symphony – Boult |
| Scelsi, Giacinto | La nascita del Verbo | 1949-10-28 | Paris | RTF National Orchestra and Chorus – Desormière |
| Schoenberg, Arnold | Phantasy for Violin and Piano | 1949-09-13 | Los Angeles | Koldofsky, Stein |
| Schuman, William | Symphony No. 6 (1948) | 1949-02-26 | Dallas | Dallas Symphony – Dorati |
| Seiber, Mátyás | Ulysses | 1949-05-27 | London | Lewis / Morley College Choir, Kalmar Orchestra – Goehr |
| Shostakovich, Dmitri | Song of the Forests | 1949-12-11 | Leningrad | [unknown chorus], Leningrad Philharmonic – Mravinsky |
| Tansman, Alexandre | Music for Strings (1947) | 1949-01-24 | Barcelona | Barcelona Chamber Orchestra – Tansman |
| Thompson, Randall | Symphony No. 3 | 1949-05-15 | New York City | CBS Symphony – Johnson |
| Ustvolskaya, Galina | The Dream of Stepan Razin | 1949-10-08 | Leningrad | [unknown baritone] / Leningrad Philharmonic – Mravinsky |
| Weinberg, Mieczysław | Moldavian Rhapsody | 1949-11-30 | Moscow (USC Plenum) | USSR Radio Symphony – Gauk |
| Zimmermann, Bernd Alois | Concerto for Strings | 1949-07-25 | Cologne | NWDR Symphony – Meylan |
| Zimmermann, Bernd Alois | Symphonic Variations and Fugue on In dulci jubilo | 1949-12-10 | Koblenz, Germany | Southwest German Radio Symphony – Gerdes |

=== Compositions ===
- Malcolm Arnold – Symphony No. 1
- Aaron Avshalomov – Second Symphony
- Henk Badings – Symphony No. 5
- Samuel Barber – Piano Sonata, Op. 26
- Marcel Bitsch – Six Esquisses symphoniques
- Pierre Boulez – Piano Sonata No. 1
- Havergal Brian – Symphony No. 8 in B-flat Minor
- Benjamin Britten – Spring Symphony
- Jani Christou – Phoenix Music, for orchestra
- George Crumb – Sonata for violin and piano
- Ferenc Farkas – Finnish Popular Dances
- Hans Werner Henze – Symphony No. 2
- Paul Hindemith
  - Sonata for Double Bass and Piano
  - Sinfonietta in E major
- Vagn Holmboe
  - String Quartet No. 2
  - Cantata No. 7
- André Jolivet – Flute Concerto
- Dmitry Kabalevsky – Cello Concerto No. 1 in G Minor, Op. 49 (1948–9)
- Wojciech Kilar – Suite for piano
- Ernst Krenek – Symphony No. 5
- Rued Langgaard – Symphony No. 15 Søstormen, BVN 375
- Olivier Messiaen – "Neumes rythmiques" and "Mode de valeurs et d'intensités", for piano (later incorporated as two of the Quatre études de rythme)
- Bruno Maderna – Composition No. 1
- Nikolai Myaskovsky
  - Cello Sonata No. 2 in A Minor, Op. 81 (1948–9)
  - Piano Sonatas 7–9, Opp. 82–4
  - Symphony No. 27 in C Minor, Op. 85
  - String Quartet No. 13 in A Minor, Op. 86
- Allan Pettersson – Violin Concerto No. 1
- Gavriil Popov – Symphony No. 4 (completed; premiere 2023)
- Sergei Prokofiev – Sonata for Cello and Piano, Op. 119
- Othmar Schoeck – Vision, Op. 63 for Men's Chorus and Orchestra
- Arnold Schoenberg
  - 5 Pieces for Orchestra, Op. 16 (second version)
  - Fantasy for Violin and Piano, Op. 47
- Dmitri Shostakovich
  - Song of the Forests (oratorio)
  - String Quartet No. 4 in D major, Op. 83
- Kaikhosru Shapurji Sorabji – Sequentia cyclica super "Dies irae" ex Missa pro defunctis
- Galina Ustvolskaya
  - Piano Sonata No. 2
  - Trio for clarinet, violin and piano
- Fartein Valen – Symphony No.4, Op. 43
- Edgard Varèse – Dance for Burgess
- Heitor Villa-Lobos
  - Guia prático, for piano
  - Homenagem a Chopin, for piano
- William Walton – Violin Sonata
- Mieczysław Weinberg – Rhapsody on Moldavian Themes, Op. 47 No. 1
- Stefan Wolpe – Sonata for Violin and Piano

== Opera ==
- Category:1949 operas

== Film ==
- Aaron Copland – The Heiress
- Aaron Copland – The Red Pony
- Anton Karas – The Third Man (featuring "The Harry Lime Theme")
- Aram Khachaturian – The Battle of Stalingrad
- Miklós Rózsa – Madame Bovary

== Musical theatre ==
- Belinda Fair London production opened at the Strand Theatre on June 30 and ran for 131 performances. Starring Adele Dixon
- Brigadoon London production opened at His Majesty's Theatre on April 14 and ran for 685 performances
- Gentlemen Prefer Blondes Broadway production opened at the Ziegfeld Theatre on December 8 and ran for 740 performances
- Her Excellency London production opened at the London Hippodrome on 22 June and ran for 252 performances. Starring Cicely Courtneidge
- King's Rhapsody London production opened at the Palace Theatre on September 15 and ran for 838 performances
- Lost in the Stars (Maxwell Anderson and Kurt Weill) – Broadway production opened at the Music Box Theatre on October 30 and ran for 273 performances
- Miss Liberty Broadway production opened at the Imperial Theatre on July 15 and ran for 308 performances. Starring Eddie Albert, Allyn Ann McLerie and Mary McCarty
- South Pacific (Richard Rodgers and Oscar Hammerstein II) – Broadway production opened at the Majestic Theatre on April 7 and ran for 1925 performances

== Musical films ==
- The Adventures of Ichabod and Mr. Toad animated film
- The Barkleys of Broadway starring Fred Astaire and Ginger Rogers
- A Connecticut Yankee in King Arthur's Court starring Bing Crosby, Rhonda Fleming, Cedric Hardwicke and William Bendix
- Dancing in the Dark
- Holiday in Havana starring Desi Arnaz and Mary Hatcher.
- In the Good Old Summertime starring Judy Garland, Van Johnson, S. Z. Sakall and Buster Keaton.
- The Inspector General starring Danny Kaye
- It's a Wonderful Day
- Look for the Silver Lining starring June Haver, Ray Bolger and Gordon MacRae
- Make Believe Ballroom starring Jerome Courtland and Ruth Warrick and featuring the King Cole Trio and Frankie Carle & His Orchestra. Directed by Joseph Santley.
- Make Mine Laughs starring Ray Bolger, Anne Shirley, Dennis Day, Joan Davis, Jack Haley, Leon Errol, Frances Langford and Frankie Carle & his Orchestra. Directed by Richard Fleischer.
- Maytime in Mayfair starring Anna Neagle and Michael Wilding.
- My Dream Is Yours starring Jack Carson and Doris Day and featuring Bugs Bunny. Directed by Michael Curtiz.
- Neptune's Daughter starring Esther Williams, Red Skelton, Ricardo Montalbán and Betty Garrett. Directed by Eddie Buzzell.
- Oh, You Beautiful Doll starring June Haver, Mark Stevens and S. Z. Sakall.
- An Old-Fashioned Girl starring Gloria Jean and Jimmy Lydon. Directed by Arthur Dreifuss.
- On the Town starring Gene Kelly, Frank Sinatra, Betty Garrett, Ann Miller, Jules Munshin and Vera-Ellen.
- Red, Hot and Blue starring Betty Hutton, Victor Mature, William Demarest, June Havoc and Frank Loesser.
- Slightly French starring Dorothy Lamour and Don Ameche.
- Take Me Out to the Ball Game starring Frank Sinatra, Gene Kelly, Betty Garrett, Esther Williams and Jules Munshin.
- That Midnight Kiss starring Kathryn Grayson, José Iturbi, Ethel Barrymore, Mario Lanza and Jules Munshin.
- Top o' the Morning starring Bing Crosby, Ann Blyth, Barry Fitzgerald and Hume Cronyn. Directed by David Miller.

== Births ==
- January 1 – Paula Tsui, Hong Kong singer and actress
- January 2 – Chick Churchill, blues rock keyboardist (Ten Years After and the Jaybirds)
- January 11 – Denny Greene, doo-wop singer and choreographer (Sha Na Na) (died 2015)
- January 12 – Andrzej Zaucha, singer
- January 15 – George Brown (Kool & the Gang)
- January 17 – Mick Taylor, rock guitarist (John Mayall's Bluesbreakers, The Rolling Stones)
- January 19 – Robert Palmer, singer (died 2003)
- January 22
  - Joseph Hill, reggae singer (died 2006)
  - Steve Perry, rock singer-songwriter (Journey)
  - Mike Westhues, American-Finnish singer-songwriter and guitarist (died 2013)
- January 24 – John Belushi, comedian, actor and singer (died 1982)
- January 27 – Djavan, Brazilian singer
- January 29
  - Leroy Sibbles (The Heptones)
  - Tommy Ramone, Hungarian-American drummer and producer (The Ramones) (died 2014)
- February 3 – Arthur Kane, American bass player (New York Dolls) (died 2004)
- February 5 – Nigel Olsson, drummer
- February 7
  - Joe English, American drummer (Wings and Sea Level)
  - Alan Lancaster, English bass player and songwriter (died 2021)
- February 12
  - Stanley Knight (Black Oak Arkansas)
  - Joaquín Sabina, singer-songwriter and poet
- February 21 – Jerry Harrison, American musician, songwriter, producer and entrepreneur (Talking Heads, The Modern Lovers)
- February 22 – Joseph Hill (Culture) (died 2006)
- February 23 – Terry Comer (Ace)
- February 25 – Esmeray, singer (died 2002)
- March 6 – Mariko Takahashi, pop singer
- March 8 – Antonello Venditti, singer-songwriter
- March 9 – Kalevi Aho, Finnish composer
- March 13
  - Julia Migenes, operatic soprano
  - Donald York (Sha Na Na)
- March 14 – Han Jin-hee, South Korean actor
- March 17 – Daniel Lavoie, singer-songwriter
- March 19 – Valery Leontiev, singer
- March 21
  - Åge Aleksandersen, singer-songwriter and guitarist
  - Eddie Money, guitarist, Saxophonist and singer-songwriter (died 2019)
- March 24
  - Nick Lowe, singer-songwriter
  - Carl Rütti, composer
- March 26
  - Vicki Lawrence, comic performer and pop singer
  - Fran Sheehan, rock bassist (Boston)
- March 27 – Poul Ruders, composer, songwriter, singer
- March 29 – Dave Greenfield, rock keyboard player (The Stranglers)
- March 30 – Lene Lovich, singer
- April 1 – Gil Scott-Heron, poet, musician and author (died 2011)
- April 3 – Richard Thompson, folk musician
- April 15 – Alla Pugacheva, Soviet and Russian singer
- April 21 – Patti LuPone, singer
- April 23 - John Miles, rock music vocalist, guitarist and keyboardist
- May 8 – Stella Parton, American country singer and songwriter (Mother of Dolly Parton)
- May 9 – Billy Joel, pianist and singer-songwriter
- May 17 – Bill Bruford, drummer (Yes and King Crimson)
- May 18
  - Rick Wakeman, multi-instrumentalist and composer
  - Bill Wallace, Canadian bass player (The Guess Who and Brother)
- May 19 – Dusty Hill, blues rock bass guitarist and singer-songwriter (ZZ Top) (died 2021)
- May 26 – Hank Williams Jr., country musician (Monday Night Football theme)
- May 29 – Francis Rossi, guitarist and singer (Status Quo)
- June 7 – Holly Near, American singer-songwriter, producer and actress
- June 11 – Frank Beard, rock drummer (ZZ Top) (died 2026)
- June 13 – Dennis Locorriere, rock singer-guitarist (Dr. Hook) (died 2026)
- June 14
  - Papa Wemba (Jules Shungu Wembadio Pene Kikumba), soukous musician (died 2016)
  - Alan White, drummer (Plastic Ono Band, Yes) (died 2022)
- June 15
  - Russell Hitchcock, singer (Air Supply)
  - Mike Lut, guitarist, singer-songwriter and producer (Brownsville Station)
- June 20 – Lionel Richie, singer
- June 22
  - Jaroslav Filip, polymath (died 2000)
  - Larry Junstrom (Lynyrd Skynyrd, 38 Special) (died 2019)
  - Alan Osmond (The Osmonds) (died 2026)
- June 26
  - John Illsley (Dire Straits)
  - Larry Taylor (Canned Heat)
- June 30 – Andrew Scott (Sweet)
- July 2
  - Roy Bittan, American keyboard player and songwriter (E Street Band)
  - Greg Brown, American singer-songwriter and guitarist
- July 3
  - Fontella Bass, singer
  - John Verity, Argent
- July 6
  - Phyllis Hyman, soul singer (died 1995)
  - Michael Shrieve, drummer (Santana)
- July 10 – Dave Smalley, guitarist (The Raspberries)
- July 11 – Liona Boyd, English-Canadian singer-songwriter and guitarist
- July 12 – John Wetton, bass guitarist (King Crimson, Roxy Music) (died 2017)
- July 15 – Trevor Horn, producer
- July 16 – Ray Major, lead guitarist (Mott the Hoople)
- July 17 – Geezer Butler, bass guitarist and songwriter (Black Sabbath)
- July 18 – Wally Bryson, guitarist (The Raspberries)
- July 26 – Roger Taylor, drummer (Queen)
- July 27
  - Maureen McGovern, singer and actress
  - Henry "H Bomb" Weck, drummer (Brownsville Station)
- July 28
  - Simon Kirke (Free, Bad Company)
  - Steve Peregrin Took (T. Rex) (died 1980)
- August 3 – B. B. Dickerson (War)
- August 11 – Eric Carmen, pop rock singer-songwriter (died 2024)
- August 12 – Mark Knopfler, guitarist and singer (Dire Straits)
- August 16 – Bill Spooner (The Tubes)
- August 17
  - Sue Draheim, American folk violinist (d. 2013)
  - Sib Hashian, rock drummer (Boston)
- August 20 – Phil Lynott, singer (Thin Lizzy, Grand Slam (died 1986)
- August 23
  - Rick Springfield, singer-songwriter and actor
  - Vicky Leandros, Greek singer
- August 25
  - Fariborz Lachini, film score composer
  - Gene Simmons (Kiss)
- August 26 – Bob Cowsill (The Cowsills)
- August 27 – Jeff Cook (Alabama) (died 2022)
- August 28 – Hugh Cornwell (The Stranglers)
- September 1 – Greg Errico (Sly & the Family Stone)
- September 5 – Clem Clempson (Humble Pie)
- September 9 – John Reid, manager
- September 10 – Barriemore Barlow, drummer (Jethro Tull)
- September 14
  - Steve Gaines (Lynyrd Skynyrd) (died 1977)
  - Fred "Sonic" Smith (MC5)
- September 18 – Kerry Livgren (Kansas)
- September 20 – Chuck Panozzo and John Panozzo (Styx)
- September 23 – Bruce Springsteen, singer-songwriter
- September 25 – Angie Bowie, American model, actress and journalist
- September 26 – Wendy Saddington (Gandharvika Dasi), blues, soul and jazz singer (died 2013)
- September 27 – Jahn Teigen, singer (died 2020)
- September 30 – Eleanor Alberga, Jamaican-British composer
- October 1 – André Rieu, violinist, conductor and composer
- October 3 – Lindsey Buckingham, guitarist, singer, composer and producer
- October 5 – B. W. Stevenson, progressive country musician (died 1988)
- October 6
  - Bobby Farrell, West Indian-born Dutch dancer (Boney M.) (died 2010)
  - Thomas McClary (The Commodores)
- October 8 – Michael Rosen (Average White Band)
- October 13 – Gary Richrath, rock guitarist and songwriter (REO Speedwagon) (died 2015)
- October 17 – Bill Hudson, pop singer (The Hudson Brothers) and actor
- October 19 – George Fenton, theme music composer (died 2026)
- October 23 – Würzel, heavy metal guitarist (Motörhead) (died 2011)
- October 27 – Garry Tallent, rock bassist (E Street Band)
- November 6 – Arturo Sandoval, jazz performer
- November 8 – Bonnie Raitt, blues singer-songwriter
- November 12 – Cândida Branca Flor, Portuguese traditional singer and entertainer (died 2001)
- November 13 – Terry Reid, singer, guitarist
- November 14 – James Young (Styx)
- November 23 – Marcia Griffiths, reggae singer
- November 28 – Paul Shaffer, bandleader, composer and actor (Late Show with David Letterman)
- December 7 – Tom Waits, singer, composer, actor
- December 8 – Ray Shulman, progressive rock musician (Gentle Giant)
- December 13
  - Randy Owen, country singer (Alabama)
  - Tom Verlaine, rock singer (Television) (died 2023)
- December 14
  - Ronnie McNeir, Motown singer (The Four Tops)
  - Cliff Williams, hard rock bassist and backing singer (Home, AC/DC)
- December 16 – Billy Gibbons, rock singer and guitarist (ZZ Top)
- December 17 – Paul Rodgers, vocalist (Free, Bad Company, Queen)
- December 19 – Lenny White, jazz drummer (Return to Forever)
- December 22 – Robin Gibb (died 2012) and Maurice Gibb (died 2003) (Bee Gees)
- December 23
  - Adrian Belew, guitarist, singer-songwriter, multi-instrumentalist and record producer
  - Luther Grosvenor (Spooky Tooth, Mott the Hoople)
- date unknown
  - Jang Sa-ik, singer
  - Eduardo Gatti, singer-songwriter
  - Anup Ghoshal, playback singer

== Deaths ==
- January 14 – Joaquín Turina, composer, 66
- January 19 – Charles Price Jones, hymn-writer, 83
- February 1 – Herbert Stothart, conductor and composer, 63
- February 1 – George Botsford, composer, 74
- February 11 – Giovanni Zenatello, opera tenor, 73
- March 7 – Sol Bloom, music industry entrepreneur, 78
- March 20 – Irving Fazola, jazz clarinetist, 36 (heart attack)
- March 28 – Grigoraş Dinicu, violinist and composer, 59
- April 3 – Basil Harwood, organist and composer, 89
- April 21 – John Garris, German operatic tenor, 37 (murdered)
- May 6 – Maurice Maeterlinck, translator and lyricist, 86
- May 10 – Emilio de Gogorza, operatic baritone, 74
- May 22 – Hans Pfitzner, German composer (born 1869)
- June 2 – Dynam-Victor Fumet, organist and composer, 82
- June 4 – Erwin Lendvai, composer and conductor, 66
- June 9 – Maria Cebotari, operatic soprano, 39 (cancer)
- June 20 – Ramón Montoya, flamenco guitarist, 69
- July 7 – Bunk Johnson, jazz trumpeter, exact age unknown
- July 9 – Fritz Hart, composer, 75
- July 18 – Vítězslav Novák, composer, 78
- August 30 – Hans Kindler, cellist, 57
- September 5 – Walter Widdop, operatic tenor, 51
- September 8 – Richard Strauss, composer, 85
- September 11 – Michael Hayvoronsky, violinist, conductor and composer (born 1892)
- September 12 – Harry T. Burleigh, composer and singer
- September 19 – Nikos Skalkottas, Greek composer, student of Arnold Schoenberg
- September 24 – Pierre de Bréville, composer, 88
- September 28 – Nancy Dalberg, Danish composer, 68
- October 1 – Buddy Clark, American singer, 38 (plane crash)
- October 4
  - Edmund Eysler, Austrian composer, 75
  - Chris Smith, composer, 69
- October 20 – Sam Collins, blues singer and guitarist, 62
- October 27 – Ginette Neveu, violin virtuoso, 30 (plane crash)
- October 28 – Rosalie Housman, composer, 61
- November 25 – Bill "Bojangles" Robinson, American tap dancer, singer and actor
- December 6 – Lead Belly, folk and blues musician, 61
- December 11 – Fiddlin' John Carson, country musician, 81
- December 17 – David Stanley Smith, composer and arranger (born 1877)
- December 28 – Ivie Anderson, jazz singer, 44 (asthma)
- date unknown
  - Alice Cucini, operatic contralto (born 1870)
  - King Solomon Hill (Joe Holmes), blues musician (born 1897)
  - Lee S. Roberts, composer and pianist (born 1885)
  - Hooper Brewster-Jones composer and pianist
