= Westhues =

Westhues is a surname. Notable people with the surname include:

- Alfons Lütke-Westhues (1930–2004), German equestrian
- August Lütke-Westhues (1926–2000), German equestrian
- Jonathan Westhues, American software engineer
- Kenneth Westhues, Canadian sociologist
- Mike Westhues (1949–2013), American-born Finnish singer-songwriter and guitarist
