= Op. 17 =

In music, Op. 17 stands for Opus number 17. Compositions that are assigned this number include:

- Adès – Asyla
- Beethoven – Horn Sonata
- Britten – Paul Bunyan
- Busoni – Concerto for Piano and String Quartet
- Chopin – Mazurkas, Op. 17
- Clara Schumann – Piano Trio
- Dvořák – The Stubborn Lovers
- Enescu – Symphony No. 2
- Ginastera – Ollantay
- Hovhaness – Symphony No. 1
- Karetnikov – Symphony No. 4
- Korngold – Piano Concerto for the Left Hand
- Larsson – Symphony No. 2 in E minor (1937)
- Nielsen – Helios Overture
- Oswald – String Quartet No. 2
- Paderewski – Piano Concerto
- Prokofiev – Sarcasms
- Rachmaninoff – Suite No. 2
- Roussel – The Spider's Feast
- Saint-Saëns – Piano Concerto No. 1
- Schoenberg – Erwartung
- Schumann – Fantasie in C
- Sibelius – Seven Songs, Op. 17, collection of art songs (1891–1904)
- Tchaikovsky – Symphony No. 2
- Wieniawski – Légende
- Zemlinsky – Der Zwerg
