= Kim Gannon =

American songwriter (1900–1974)

- Born: James Kimball Gannon; November 18, 1900; Brooklyn, New York, U.S.
- Died: April 29, 1974 (aged 73); Lake Worth, Florida, U.S.
- Occupation: Songwriter

James Kimball "Kim" Gannon (November 18, 1900 – April 29, 1974) was an American songwriter, often working as a lyricist. His best known song may be the Christmas standard "I'll Be Home for Christmas," first popularized in 1943, with Gannon writing the lyrics and Walter Kent composing the music.

== Biography ==
Gannon was born in Brooklyn, New York to an Irish-American family from Fort Ann in upstate New York, but grew up in New Jersey where he attended Montclair High School and was a member of Omega Gamma Delta fraternity. He graduated from St. Lawrence University and, intending to become a lawyer, attended the Albany Law School, passing the bar examination in New York State in 1934.

In 1939 he wrote his first song, "For Tonight". His 1942 song, "Moonlight Cocktail", was recorded by the Glenn Miller Orchestra and was the best-selling record in the United States for 10 weeks. In 1942 he began writing songs for films, beginning with the lyrics of the title song for Always in My Heart. He subsequently contributed songs to other films, including The Powers Girl and If Winter Comes. In 1951 he turned to the Broadway stage, joining with composer Walter Kent to write the score for Seventeen.

Gannon collaborated with a number of writers, including, J. Fred Coots, Walter Kent, Josef Myrow, Max Steiner, Jule Styne, Mabel Wayne, and Luckey Roberts.

He died in Lake Worth, Florida, at the age of 73.

=== Songs ===
Among songs which Gannon wrote or co-wrote are the following:

- "Alma Mater (St. Lawrence University)"
- "Always in My Heart"
- "Angel in Disguise"
- "Autumn Nocturne"
- "Croce di Oro"
- "Don't Worry"
- "A Dreamer's Holiday"
- "Easy as Pie"
- "Five O'clock Whistle"
- "The Gentleman Needs a Shave"
- "Hey Doc!"
- "I'll Be Home for Christmas"
- "I Understand"
- "I Want to Be Wanted", his final hit
- "Johnny Appleseed"
- "Make Love to Me" (not the 1954 song of that title, but an earlier one)
- "Moonlight Cocktail"
- "Pioneer Song"
- "Romance a la Mode" (with Arthur Altman)
- "Under Paris Skies" (English lyrics)
