= A Dreamer's Holiday =

Song
- Published: 1949
- Composer: Mabel Wayne
- Lyricist: Kim Gannon

"A Dreamer's Holiday" is a popular song. The music was written by Mabel Wayne, the lyrics by Kim Gannon. The song was published in 1949. Hit versions of the song were recorded by Perry Como and Buddy Clark.

== 1949 versions ==
- The version by Perry Como and The Fontane Sisters was recorded on August 11, 1949 with the Mitchell Ayres Orchestra and released by RCA Victor as catalog numbers 20-3543 (78 rpm) and 47-3036 (45 rpm). It first reached the Billboard magazine charts on October 14, 1949, and lasted 19 weeks on the chart, peaking at #4.
- The version by Buddy Clark with The Girl Friends and orchestra conducted by Ted Dale was recorded on September 6, 1949 and was released by Columbia Records as catalog number 38599. It first reached the Billboard magazine charts on November 4, 1949, and lasted 10 weeks on the chart, peaking at #15. The song was the last charted hit for Clark, reaching the charts after his death on October 1.

== Cover versions ==
- In 1983, Willie Nelson covered it on his Without a Song album.
- In 1992, Leon Redbone covered it on his Lazy River album.
- In 2020, Julien Baker covered it in a Spotify Singles album.
