= Symphony No. 1 (Arnold) =

Symphony by Malcolm Arnold

Decca collection of Malcolm Arnold's Symphonies Nos 1 to 9 plus the Symphony for Brass and the Symphony for Strings

The Symphony No. 1, Op. 22, is a symphony written by Malcolm Arnold in 1949. Arnold conducted the first performance at the Cheltenham Music Festival in 1951, with The Hallé Orchestra. A miniature score was published in 1952.

The work is in three movements:

1. Allegro (in D minor)
2. Andantino (in C major)
3. Vivace con fuoco (in D major)

== Commercial recordings ==
- 1980: Malcolm Arnold and the Bournemouth Symphony Orchestra on EMI Classics HMV ASD 3823 (LP) (latest re-release on EMI 382 1462)
- 1995: Richard Hickox and the London Symphony Orchestra on Chandos Records CHAN 9335
- 1996: Vernon Handley and the Royal Philharmonic Orchestra on Conifer 75605-51257-2 (re-released on Decca 4765337)
- 1996: Andrew Penny and the RTÉ National Symphony Orchestra on Naxos Records 8.553406 (recorded 10–11 April 1995, in the presence of the composer)
- 2012: Keith Lockhart and the BBC Concert Orchestra on BBC Music Magazine V20N11 (recorded 7 May 2012)
