= Luckey Roberts =

American jazz pianist and composer (1887–1968)

- Roberts in 1958; by Art Kane
- Born: Charles Luckyth Roberts; August 7, 1887; Philadelphia, Pennsylvania, U.S.
- Died: February 5, 1968 (aged 80); New York City, U.S.
- Burial place: Frederick Douglass Memorial Park, Staten Island, New York
- Other names: Charles Luckeyth Roberts; C. Luckeyth Roberts; Luckey Roberts; Lucky Roberts
- Occupations: Musician; composer
- Spouse: Lena Sanford Roberts (m. 1911; died 1958)
- Relatives: William L. Roberts (father); Elizabeth Williams (mother)
- Musical career
- Genres: Stride; jazz; ragtime; blues
- Instrument: Piano

Charles Luckyth Roberts (August 7, 1887 – February 5, 1968), better known as Luckey Roberts, was an American stride pianist and composer who worked in the jazz, ragtime, and blues styles. Roberts performed as musician, bandleader, and dancer. He taught music and dance. He also owned a restaurant and bar in New York City and in Washington, D.C. Luckey Roberts noted compositions include "Junk Man Rag", "Moonlight Cocktail", "Pork and Beans" (1913), and "Railroad Blues".

== Life and career ==
=== Childhood with traveling vaudeville acts ===
Luckey Roberts was born in Philadelphia, Pennsylvania, United States, and was playing piano and acting professionally with traveling Vaudeville and Negro minstrel shows in his childhood. His father, William Roberts, an unaccredited self-taught veterinarian, was overwhelmed by the responsibility of single parenthood when his mother, Elizabeth Williams Roberts, died just three weeks after his birth. His father engaged the Ringolds, a show-business family, to raise him. With the Ringolds influence, he became a lifelong Quaker, teetotaler (Teetotalism), and abstained from using tobacco. His first stage performance was as a toddler with a troupe performing Uncle Tom's Cabin. His vaudeville career began at age 5.

By the age of 7, he had taught himself to play piano, but only in the key of F-sharp, which is based on the black keys. As a child, he was paid to sing and dance with Gus Sulky (sometimes spelled Gus Selke) and his Pickaninnies in theater work as a picaninny. His father was involved in his childhood, ensuring his health and happiness. One biographer reports: "One night his father saw him perform for the first time dressed only in a raffia shirt. Enraged, Roberts Sr. stopped the show. The packed house roared, thinking the scene was part of the show."

Reconciliation was made, and Roberts' father financed a visit to Lonnie Hicks (Hoofers Club), a leading ragtime pianist, who Roberts later credited with mentoring his early career in music. Roberts also performed with Mayme Remington's Black Buster Brownies Ethiopian Prodigies. For about a 10-year period, Roberts toured Europe three times in addition to many USA performances which showcased his childhood talents of singing, dancing, tumbling, and juggling. Mayme Remington's troupe paid him $1.25 weekly plus room and board and tutoring (from the team Prevost, Rice & Prevost), and sent his father $5 weekly for five years. Roberts accompanied the drum corps at Philadelphia's First Regiment Armoury one summer.

Roberts performed at Billy William's restaurant, in Baltimore, Maryland, in the summer of 1905. Roberts took fighting lessons from Joe Gans, a former lightweight champion boxer. During this time he and pianist Eubie Blake, a lifelong friend, at Joe Gans's saloon, collaborated on ideas for piano composition. During another vacation from annual vaudeville touring, he performed at the Green Dragon saloon in Philadelphia.

=== 1910 and the origins of stride ===
Roberts settled in New York City about 1910. He became one of the leading pianists in Harlem and started publishing some of his original rags, assisted by Artie Matthews although he regularly won cutting contests he was still learning how to annotate music:

- "Nothin'" (1908) originally entitled "Park Avenue Polka"
- "Shoo Fly" (c. 1910s)
- "Ripples of the Nile" (c. 1912)Roberts, Charles Luckeyth (January 25, 2014). "Watch: Luckey Roberts - Ripples Of The Nile [May 21, 1946]" (video). youtube.com. 12probandoprobando.

On December 28, 1911, he married his lifelong partner Lena Sanford Roberts, a musical comedy actress, who he met while they were traveling with J. Leubrie Hill in the My Friend from Dixie company. Lena frequently performed as a soloist in Roberts's bands in the Harlem Renaissance and throughout his career.

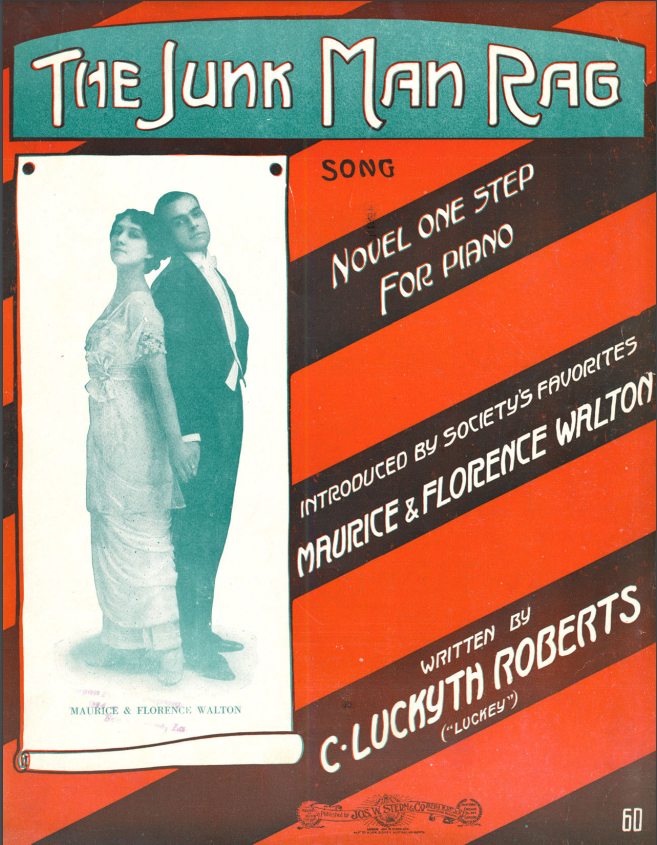
"The Junk Man Rag" by C. Luckyth "Luckey" Roberts was a popular ragtime piece in the early 1900s.

In 1911, Roberts composed "The Junk Man Rag", but since he could not yet notate music, he elicited ragtime pianist Artie Matthews's help to create publishable sheet music. In 1913, "The Junk Man Rag," a one-step, with lyrics Chris Smith and Ferd Mierisch, for Turkey Trot Opera written by Will Marion Cook. "The Junk Man Rag" was subsequently published both as an instrumental (piano) solo and as a song (with lyrics by Chris Smith (composer) (1879–1949) and Ferd E. Mierisch (fl. 1911–1914), by Jos. W. Stern & Co., 102-104 W. 38th St., N.Y., 1913 Roberts sheet music was often annotated as being 'simplified' since the complex ornamentation and decoration that he and the other ragtime performers embellished into their pieces were not easily scored or played by others. Fortunately, there are existing recordings and piano rolls of Roberts and contemporaries performing "The Junk Man Rag".

- YouTube: Junk Man Rag (1914) played by the composer
- YouTube: C. Luckyth Roberts The Junk Man Rag 1910s piano roll on 1912 by pump player piano artist Artis Wodehouse. This Piano roll was arranged and played by Leland Stanford Roberts (1884–1949) (aka Stanford Robar) on a 1912 foot-pump player piano.
- YouTube: Lucky Roberts "Junk Man Rag" the original Connorized Piano roll played on the W. W. Kimball player piano at the Scott Joplin House State Historic Site, St. Louis, MO
- Library of Congress Audio Recording: The junk-man rag, one-step or two-step, performed by the Victor Military Band on November 11, 1913
- Library of Congress Audio Recording: Junk man rag with Fred Van Eps as solo banjo player and orchestra recorded September 6, 1913
- YouTube: Junk Man Rag (1913) - Very early hand-played Piano roll Junk Man Rag, recorded in 1913 in Chicago as a duet by Sallie Heibronner and Mabel Avery Cripe (born in 1879 and 1881, respectively). Features syncopated embellishments in the primo part.

A complete analysis of Roberts work would therefore necessarily entail an in-depth analysis of the published scores, a study of any existing piano rolls (which don't always capture the dynamics) and recordings (which at the time had difficulty capturing rapid embellishments), as well as a consideration of interviews and contemporary commentary which give insight into the performance improvisation and reading the room whether for stage performance, a cutting competition, or private dance entertainment.

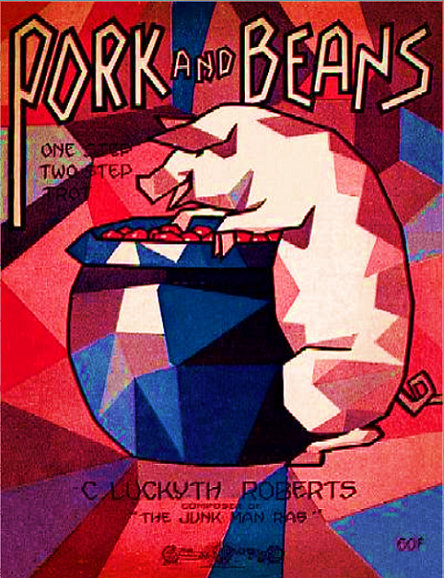
Named for one of his favorite dishes, Luckey Roberts published "Pork and Beans" on June 24, 1913, and recorded the work in May 1946.

Roberts next big hit was "Pork and Beans", annotated as a One-Step or Two-Step and recognized as a Fox Trot, and an early example of Stride (music) style. Some notable recordings of "Pork and Beans" exist at the Library of Congress and on YouTube:

- YouTube: "Pork and Beans" (1913)
- YouTube: "Pork and Beans" played by James P. Johnson
- YouTube: Pork and Beans, Charles Luckeyth Roberts (1913) - Piano Roll (Scott Joplin House, rec. 2012)
- YouTube: Donald Lambert Plays Luckey Roberts' Pork And Beans 1961 (Fast Stride Piano Synthesia). This is the first track on the International Association of Jazz Record Collectors (IAJ2RC) LP 23, and was recorded in Wallace's Hill Tavern, West Orange, NJ, on August 21, 1961. Lambert plays in key of F♯ minor, then F♯(=G♭) major for the trio.
- Library of Congress Audio: Pork and beans, composed by Luckey Roberts. Dance Music: Fox trot. Performed by the Rector Novelty Orchestra led by Earl Fuller
- Sheet music online: Pork and Beans, One Step-Two Step or Turkey Trot. By C. Luckyth Roberts. Composer of "The Junk Man" Copyright 1913 by Jos. W. Stern & Co. https://levysheetmusic.mse.jhu.edu/sites/default/files/collection-pdfs/levy-172-065.pdf

From 1911 to 1919, among other work, Roberts served as the music director with producers Homer Tutt and Salem Tutt Whitney in their Southern Smart Set Company, an off-broadway troupe, that produced the Smart Set musical comedy Together they formed the Roberts & Tutts Publishing Company, 110 West 130th St. New York City, and some of Robert's compositions were published as sheet music from Smart Set Company musical comedies. Tutt Brothers hired Roberts to write some musical comedies:

- My People, Roberts' first broadway show (c. 1917)
- Smart Set (1919) yielding sheet music published by Roberts and Tutts Pub. Co.:
  - "Little Boy - Little Soldier"
  - YouTube: "The Irresistible Blues" (1918)
  - "Keep On Smiling"
- Darkest Americans (1919), a musical comedy with cast of characters: Abraham Dubois Washington (Salem Tutt Whitney), Gabriel Douglass (Homer Tutt), Professor at Howard University (Alonzo Fenderson), Dean Kelly Miller, Howard University (Alfred E. Watts), R. Vernon, a journalist (Wilber White), President of the U.S.A. (Ed Tollier), Vice President of the U.S.A. (Nat Cash), Red Cap (Sammie Lewin), and others (Lena Sanford Roberts, Estelle Cash, Edna Gibbs, Emma Jackson, Virginia Wheeler). Synopsis: Dean Miller goes on an archeological research trip in the interest of his university. Abe and Gabe enter Howard University under false pretenses. Dean Miller is missing; Abe and Gabe are hired to search for him. Their global escapade includes many exciting and ludicrous adventures. The dean is found, they return home, and everything ends happily.

These successes led to a series of very popular compositions by Roberts for solo piano and song (vocalist and piano):

- "Music Box Rag" (1914).
  - YouTube and Library of Congress Audio: 'Metropolitan Dance Band - Music Box Rag - 1914 - 1910s Ragtime music' played by the Victor Military Band, directed by Edward T. King recorded Dec. 3, 1914 in New York.
  - The Music Box Rag Jaudas' Society Orchestra with Eugene A. Jaudas (conductor) recorded Feb. 2, 2015 on Edison Label.
  - Sheet Music online: Music Box Rag, Fox Trot, published by Jos W. Stern and Co., 1914, F major, Moderato https://yorkspace.library.yorku.ca/bitstreams/e44d0f7b-db59-4841-a39b-5e5c167c78cd/download
  - Roberts, Charles Luckeyth (February 26, 2023). "Watch: Music Box Rag by C. Luckyth Roberts (1914)" (video). youtube.com. Compukats.
- "Tremelo Trot" (1914)
- "Palm Beach" (1915), published by Joseph W. Stern Roberts, Charles Luckeyth (May 5, 2023). "Watch: Palm Beach by Luckyth Roberts (1915, Fox Trot piano)" (video). youtube.com. RagtimeDorianHenry (piano).
- Helter Skelter, One Step Polka (1915)
- "Spanish Fandango" (1915)
- "Bon Ton" (1915), an instrumental one-step, arranged by J. Louis von der Mehden and performed by Patrick Conway Band on Aug. 3, 2015 by Victor Talking Machine Company
- "Blue Fever" (1919)
- "Spanish Venus" (c. 1920)
- "Lonesome Longin' Blues" (1922)

In 1913, through the encouragement of Lester Walton, Roberts teamed up with lyricist Alex Rogers to produce Broadway musicals, many of which resulted in subsequent publication of popular sheet music. Roberts successful partnership with Rogers lasted until 1930 when Rogers died.

For many years, Roberts held side jobs: doubled as a pool hustler, taught music and dance, and taught boxing and swimming at the YMCA.

=== World War I (1914–1918) ===
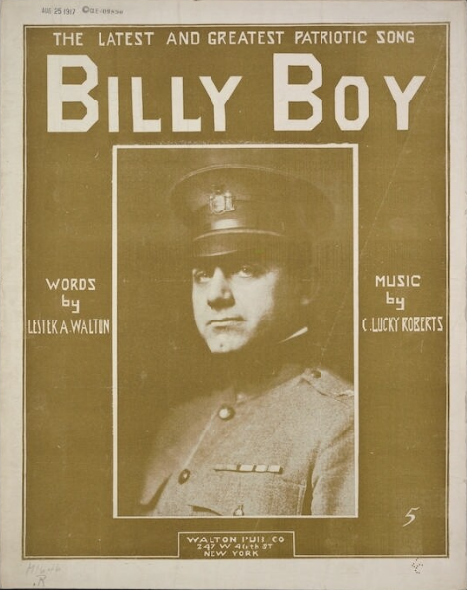
1917 sheet music cover for "Billy Boy"

During World War I, he served with the 369th Infantry Regiment (United States) "Hellfighters" platoon and band. Roberts toured France and the UK with James Reese Europe during World War I.

Notable war-themed works:

- "The Little Corporal" (1914)
- "Billy Boy" (1917) a ragtime march dedicated to Col. William Hayward (American attorney) of the 15th Infantry Regiment (United States). Composed by Luckey Roberts with Lyrics by Lester A. Walton. Published by Walton Publishing Co., 102-104 Est 38th St. New York (1917).
- "When the 'Yanks' Yank the 'Germ' out of 'German'" (1918) a ragtime march. Composed by Luckey Roberts with Lyrics by Alex Rogers and Lester A. Walton. (unpublished handwritten monograph).
- "The Navy Blues" (1918) a ragtime march. Composed by Luckey Roberts with Lyrics by Alex Rogers and Lester A. Walton. (unpublished handwritten monograph; copyrighted 1918 by McCarthy & Fisher Inc. 224 West 46th St. New York, N.Y.).

Through these associations he became an occasional performer for the Vernon and Irene Castle dance team.

=== 1920s ===
When Roberts returned to New York, where he wrote music for various shows and recorded piano rolls.

With James P. Johnson, Roberts developed the stride piano style of playing about 1919. Roberts' reach on the keyboard was unusually large (he could reach a fourteenth), leading to a rumor that he had the webbing between his fingers surgically cut, which those who knew him and saw him play live denounce as false; Roberts simply had naturally large hands with wide finger spread.

Roberts was the orchestra director of Shuffle Inn (165 West 131st Street, New York), named after hit musical revue Shuffle Along, by Noble Sissle and Eubie Blake, a venue that opened in November 1921 and was managed by Jack Goldberg. In 1923, the Shuffle Inn moved to basement next door to the Lafayette Theatre and was renamed Connie's Inn.

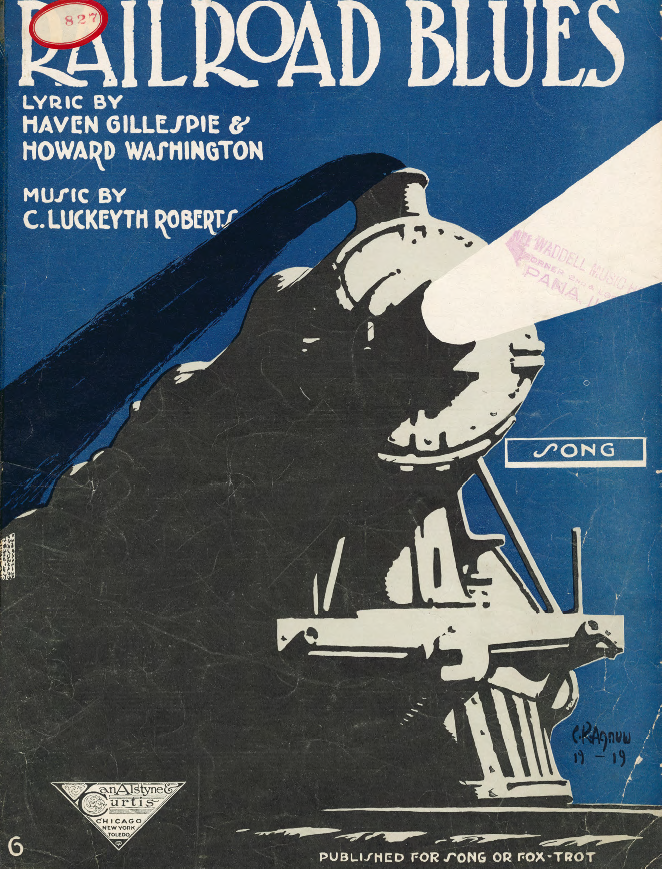
Sheet music cover for "Railroad Blues", a song composed by C. Luckeyth Roberts with lyrics by Howard Washington and Haven Gillespie, edited by Roy Bargy, published by Van Alstyne and Curtis, Chicago (1920).

Roberts 1920s hit "Railroad Blues", a fox trot, was published and recorded for solo piano, as a song with vocalist and piano, and as an orchestration. In "Railroad Blues", Roberts mimics the sounds of a train using his stride (music) techniques:

- Roberts punched a Piano Roll of "Railroad Blues" for the Vocalstyle company in 1919.
- YouTube: Examples of "Railroad Blues" with composer performing in 1946 and 1958.
- Sheet Music: "Railroad Blues" a song with Lyrics by Howard Washington and Haven Gillespie, edited by Roy Bargy, published by Van Alstyne and Curtis, Chicago (1920).
- Library of Congress Audio File: "Railroad Blues", Arranged by Roy Bargy for orchestra. Recorded on Victor Label on September 32, 1920, as performed by Benson Orchestra of Chicago featuring Matthew Amaturo (clarinet, alto saxophone, soprano saxophone), Rick Adkins (trumpet), Thomas Thatcher (tenor saxophone), Roy Bargy (piano, orchestra conductor), Guy Carey (Trombone), Joe Baum (Violin), Joe Miller (Banjo), and William Foeste (Bass Saxophone).
- Railroad Blues performed by Harry Raderman's Jazz Orchestra, Edison Cylinder Recording: Edison 4156 "WATCH: Railroad Blues performed by Harry Raderman's Jazz Orchestra, Edison Cylinder Recording". YouTube. August 28, 2020.

His other 1920s notable solo works with various lyricists include:

- "Tallahassee"
- "Goo Googily Goo"
- "I Want a Good Baby Bad", with Sam M. Lewis and Joe Young (1923)

In the 1920s Roberts toured with, Luckey Roberts and His 12 Browns on Vaudeville.

=== Roberts and Rogers collaboration (1913–1930) ===
In 1920, Roberts and Alex Rogers started the publishing company, Rogers & Roberts at 386 Cumberland Street in Brooklyn, at first releasing songs from their musical comedy Baby Blues. Throughout the 1920s, Roberts composed music and co-wrote Broadway musicals, generally credited with contributing to 23 musicals, as well as radio comedy shows. Many of their successful numbers were performed by famous show celebrities include They wrote successful numbers for such famous show folk as Molly Williams, Nora Bayes, Bert Williams, Al Jolson, Sophie Tucker, and Marie Cahill.

==== Radio comedy ====
Alex Rogers and Roberts wrote all the material for the radio comedy show Two Black Crows, featuring Moran and Mack, broadcast every Sunday night at 9 p.m. over station WABC for several months. They collaborated to write the sketch. Roberts played piano solos and Alex Rogers played a character in the skit. A few recordings are available online as audio files at the University of California, Santa Barbara, Library:

- "Two black crows Part 3" (Aug. 7, 1927)
- "Two black crows Part 4" (Nov. 7, 1927)
- "Two black crows Part 7" (Dec. 23, 1927)
- "Elder Eatmore's Sermon On Throwing Stones" (Dec. 21, 1927)

==== Broadway and Off-Broadway musicals ====
- Shy and Sly (1915)
  - "Shy & Sly". Roberts, Charles Luckeyth (December 25, 2014). "Watch: Shy & Sly" (video). youtube.com. Luckey Roberts - Topic.
- This and That (1916) West End in collaboration with Alex Rogers and written for the Quality Amusement Company.
- Baby Blues (1920) a musical collaboration with Alex Rogers and written for the Quality Amusement Company included:
  - "Baby Blues"
  - "Rock-a-bye Baby Blues"
  - "Any Old Dance is a Wonderful Dance, When You Dance with a Wonderful Girl"
  - "Jewel of the Big Blue Nile"
- Follies of the Stroll
- Go! Go! (1923), written for John Cort (impresario). There were 138 performances Apollo Theatre (New York, NY) 6/25/1923 - 7/14/1923, Daly's 63rd Street Theatre (New York, NY) 3/12/1923 - 6/24/1923
  Synopsis: Jack Locksmith (Bernard Granville), a young doughboy in World War I, falls passionately in love with Isabelle Parker (Josephine Stevens), a nurse treating wounded in France. After the war, he searches for her hometown New York City, only to confuse her identity with Florence Parker (also played by Stevens) and becomes disillusioned by this new personality. Eventually, their boyfriends learn that they are identical twins and all is resolved and happy.
  Reviewers loved the show and lasted 4 months on Broadway.
  The numbers below with "**" were also published as sheet music by Shapiro, Bernstein & Co., Inc., Corner of Broadway & 47th Street, New York, 1923:
  - "New York Town"
  - **"Doggone Whippoorwill"
  - "Good Bye, Honey Falls"
  - "Have You Any Little Thing"
  - "Any Old Time at All"
  - "I'm Scared of You"
  - **"Rosetime and You"
  - "Happy"
  - **"Strutting the Blues Away"
  - "Honey"
  - **"When You Dance With a Wonderful Girl", a Waltz
    - YouTube: Edison Recording "WATCH: When You Dance With A Wonderful Girl, Edison 51256-R, performed by Steven's Trio". YouTube. July 29, 2016.
  - **"Mo'lasses"
    - "Mo'Lasses" played by the composer, Charles Luckeyth (Luckey) Roberts, on QRS 2306, pumped on a 1917 Cable Carola Inner Player player piano. Roberts, Charles Luckeyth (August 27, 2023). "Watch: Mo'Lasses by Luckey Roberts" (video). youtube.com. metaphorce42.
  - "Indian Moon"
  - **"Uno"
  - **"Isabel"
  - "Lolly-Papa"
  - **"Go Go Bug"
  - "Pat Your Feet"
- Sharlee (1923), 36 performances Daly's 63rd Street Theatre (New York, NY) 11/22/1923 - 12/22/1923 Synopsis: Manhattan cabaret performer Sharlee Saunders (Juliette Day), gives up both her successful career and the affection a wealthy man to marry a live in the country where she marries a young man who turns out to be untrustworthy.
  Numbers included:
  - "Loving is a Habit"
  - "Sharlee"
  - "Little Drops of Water"
  - "Princess Nicotine"
  - "Heart Beats"
  - "Cry Baby"
  - "Love Today"
  - "Broadway Rose"
  - "Toodle Oo"
  - "My Caveman - My Venus"
  - "My Sunshine"
  - "Love is the Bunk"
  - "Honeymoon Row"
  - "Daddy" (not listed in program)
  - "Leaping Leopards" (not listed in program)
- Steppin' Time (1924)
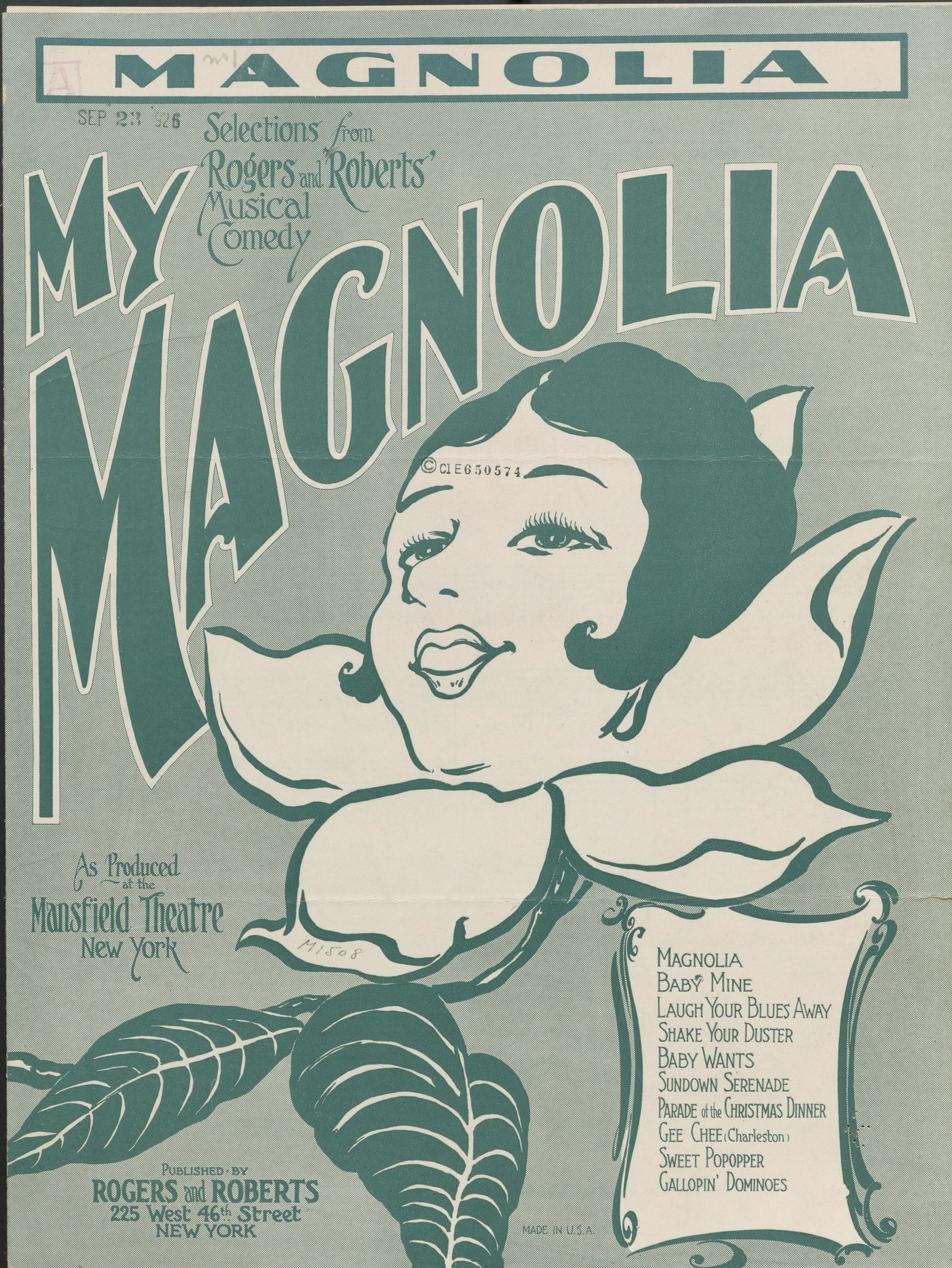
  Sheet music cover for the musical My Magnolia with lyrics by Alex C. Rogers and music by C. Luckey Roberts) published by Rogers & Roberts in 1926
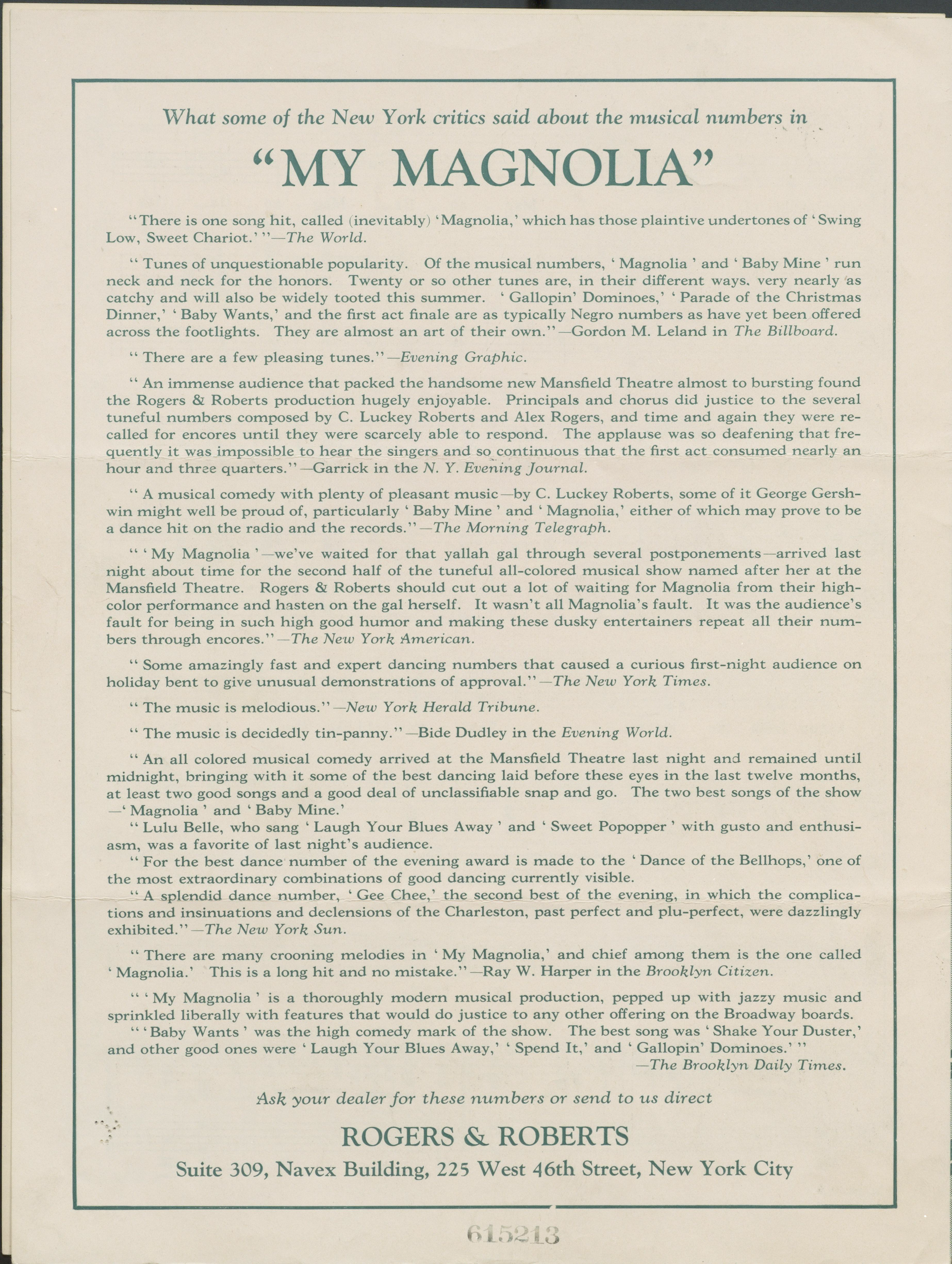
  Sheet music back cover to "Magnolia" from the musical My Magnolia (Lyrics by Alex C. Rogers and Music by C. Luckey Roberts) published by Rogers & Roberts in 1926.
- My Magnolia (1926), a musical comedy with book and lyrics by Alex Rogers and Eddie Hunter, which opened at the Sam H. Harris Theater and starred Adelaide Hall, a major black revue star. Producers: Alex Rogers, Luckey Roberts. Book, Lyrics: Alex Rogers. Music: Luckey Roberts. Dances: Charley Davis. Cast of Characters: Peggy Switch (Hilda Rogers), Harvey (Paul Bass), Jody (Percy Coiston), Mr. Workem (Lionel Monagas), Jasper Downson (Barrington Carter), Johnny Page (George Randol), Chief (Claude Lawson), Dusty Snow (Alberta Perkins), Sherman (Eddie Hunter (performer)), Jerry (Estelle Floyd), Widow Love (Lena Sanford Roberts), Geraldine (Mabel Grant), Magnolia (Catherine Parker). My Magnolia played at Mansfield Theatre, 256 W 47th St., New York, NY. Dances arranged by Charles "Charlie" Davis. The show opened 12 July 1926 at the Mansfield Theatre and closed 16 July 1926 after 6 performances.
  Synopsis: A group of friends and family moved "with disturbing frequency" throughout New York City's Harlem clubs, Hotel Strutt, the corner of Lenox Avenue and 135th Street, the "Gallopin’ Dominoes" Association, a railroad station in Jersey City, and end in New Orleans residence. To compare the performance to modern comedy, it was somewhat of a Seinfeld show about nothing, but situations wherein comedians can interact in a series of sketches. In summary, based on a book by Alex Rogers and Eddie Hunter, the show was a revenue with setting was in and around Harlem's Black Belt in New York and New Orleans.
  Although reviewers criticized it as a comedy musical, saying the plot was long and rambling and Eddie Hunter was not amusing, newspapers delighted in the performers dance and music: "amazingly fast and expert dancing numbers" were rewarded with "unusual demonstrations of approbation";: "The chorus of men and women, individually and collectively, seemed to look upon dancing as a breath of life. They performed Charlestons, taps, and other convolutions with frenzied expertness."; "There are one or two good tunes by C. Luckey Roberts as other items for the credit side of the ledger." Despite the Broadway reviews, the musical was performed for 20 weeks on Vaudeville circuits with the title Strutting Time.
  To avoid confliction or charges of plagiarism for the use of the name Magnolia in Show Boat, Ziegfeld purchased the rights to My Magnoilia in November 1926.
  The numbers below with "**" were also published as sheet music by published in 1926 by the Rogers & Roberts publishing company, Suite 309, Navex Building, 225 West 46th Street, New York City, NY.
  Numbers included:
  - "At Your Service"
  - **"Baby Mine"
  - **"Shake Your Duster"
  - "Pay Day"
  - **"Magnolia"
  - "Hard Times"
  - "Spend It"
  - "Jazz Land Ball"
  - **"Laugh Your Blues Away"
  - **"Gallopin' Dominoes"
  - "Headin' South"
  - "Merry Christmas"
  - "Struttin' Time"
  - "Our Child"
  - **"Gee Chee"
  - **"Sundown Serenade"
  - **"Parade of the Christmas Dinner"
  - **"Baby Wants"
  - "The Oof Dah Man"
  - **"Sweet Popopper"
- Sadie Lou (1928) announced, but lacks clear record of whether or not it was performed.

==== Hit singles ====
Among the hit singles with music by Roberts and lyrics by Rogers were:

- "The Robin and the Red, Red Rose" (1915)
- "Rockaway", The swaying rag song rage! by Luckey Roberts (composer) with Alex Rogers and Howard E. Johnson (lyrics) Published by Leo Feist, New York. (1917).
  - Sheet Music: Rockaway, composed by Luckey Roberts, with Howard E. Johnson and Alex Rogers (librettists), F major
  - Library of Congress Audio: "Rockaway" performed by Irving Kaufman (singer) (tenor) on Columbia Label on August 8, 1917.
- "My Little Hush-a-bye Lady" (1920)
- "Lonesome Longin' Blues" (1922)
- "Mamie" (1923)
- "I Want a Good Baby Bad" (1923) with Sam M. Lewis and Joe Young
- "Bon Bon Buddy"
- "Why Adam Sinned"
- "Porto Rico Maid" (c. 1930)

==== Comedy phonographic (monologue, sketch, song) ====
The Library of Congress National Jukebox archive and the University of California San Diego's Discography of American Historical Recordings Collection include a number of routines written by Rogers and Roberts. These are often performed by Rogers with Roberts accompanying on piano. Eddie Hunter, a comedian and the star of Broadway show How Come recorded and sold several commercially.

- "Elder Eatmore's Sermon" (famously performed by Bert Williams)
- "I Got" (recorded on Victor Label August 22, 1923, featuring Eddie Hunter (performer) and Rosario Bourdon as conductor of the orchestra).
- "I'm done" recorded on Victor Label Dec. 17, 1923, featuring Luckey Roberts (piano instrumentalist), Alex Rogers (vocalist), and Eddie Hunter (performer) (vocalist)
- "Entangled, part 1" a Monologue, with male vocal quartet and piano, recorded July 19, 1922 on Victor B-26700, performed by Alex Rogers, Tennessee Four, and Luckey Roberts (piano)
- "Entangled, part 2" a Monologue, with male vocal quartet and piano, recorded July 19, 1922 on Victor B-26700, performed by Alex Rogers, Tennessee Four, and Luckey Roberts (piano)
- "Complainin' (It's human nature to complain)"
  - "Complainin' (It's human nature to complain)" Male vocal solo, with orchestra, recorded July 25, 1923 on Victor B-28419, performed by Eddie Hunter
  - "Complainin' (It's human nature to complain)" Female vocal solo, with orchestra, recorded July 25, 1923 on OKeh S-70565, performed by Sophie Tucker "WATCH: Sophie Tucker... Complaining...It's human nature to complain... OKeh Record 4617A". Jack Stanley. September 27, 2017.
- "Hard times" Male vocal solo, with orchestra, recorded November 16, 1923 on Victor B-28897, performed by Eddie Hunter and Lucky Roberts (piano) "WATCH: HARD TIMES by Eddie Hunter 1923". cdbpdx. August 21, 2023.
- "Mamie" Male vocal solo, with orchestra, recorded November 16, 1923 on Victor B-28898, performed by Eddie Hunter and Lucky Roberts (piano) "WATCH: MAMIE by Eddie Hunter 1923". cdbpdx. August 21, 2023.
- "Bootleggers' ball" Comic dialogue and male vocal solo, with piano, recorded November 16, 1923 on Victor B-29010, performed by Eddie Hunter, Alex Rogers, and Lucky Roberts (piano) "AUDIO: Victor matrix B-29010. Bootleggers' ball / Eddie Hunter; Alex Rogers". UCSD ADP.
- "Baby Wants" Male vocal duet, with piano, recorded July 19, 1927 on Victor BVE-39674 and a trial recording was made March 12, 1924 on Victor Trial 1924-03-12-01, performed by Eddie Hunter, Alex Rogers, and Lucky Roberts (piano)
- "Gallopin' dominoes" Male vocal duet, with piano, recorded July 19, 1927 on Victor BVE-39675, performed by Eddie Hunter, Alex Rogers, and Lucky Roberts (piano)
- "Peace of mind" Male vocal duet, with piano, recorded July 19, 1927 on Victor BVE-39676 and March 12, 1924, on Victor Trial 1924-03-12-03, performed by Eddie Hunter, Alex Rogers, and Lucky Roberts (piano)
- "Gravy" Male vocal duet, with piano, recorded July 19, 1927 on Victor BVE-39677, performed by Eddie Hunter, Alex Rogers, and Lucky Roberts (piano)
- "Up in my sweetie's suite" Male vocal duet, with piano, recorded July 19, 1927 on Victor BVE-39678, performed by Eddie Hunter, Alex Rogers, and Lucky Roberts (piano)
- "Satin finish" Male vocal duet, with piano, recorded March 12, 1924 on Victor Trial 1924-03-12-02, performed by Eddie Hunter, Alex Rogers, and Lucky Roberts (piano)

==== Contributions to the Ziegfeld Follies ====
Having been introduced to Florenz Ziegfeld Jr. by Will Marion Cook, Roberts composed numbers for Bert Williams, then the star of the Ziegfeld Follies.

Roberts created and performed "Midnight Frolic Glide", the finale of Florenz Ziegfeld Jr.'s two-season (1916–1917) Follies, that clicked on the New Amsterdam Roof. A recording (Victor 35645-A, recorded July 2, 1917, Conway's Band, Patrick Conway, Conductor) includes "Midnight Frolic - Medley Fox Trot" likely this piece, although generally the entire show music is credited to David Stamper.

The records are scarce for determining exactly which comedy routines written by Roberts and Rogers were performed in the Ziegfeld Follies by comedians like Bert Williams and Eddie Cantor, but their comedy sketches featuring Eddie Hunter are representative. For example, Bert Williams performed "Elder Eatmore's Sermon".

Around August 1927, Florenz Ziegfeld hired Rogers and Roberts to select and work with a chorus of 40 performers for Show Boat.

=== Entertainer for social registered aristocracy ===
In 1924, Luckey accepted an elite social-function gig at the Everglades Club in Palm Beach, a resort for New York Society "snowbirds". He moved his band seasonally to Palm Beach to accept the many requests for private entertainment for their various social functions. At the time, he charged about $1,700 for a single engagement, and his musicians were among the highest paid in the profession. It was noted in that the foxtrot and the Charleston were commonly danced at these parties. Elmer Snowden, a banjo player in Robert's group, recalled playing for millionaires as late as 1935 to 1939. Although Society was hit hard by the Great Depression, Roberts, admired for his generosity, was resilient and reported to have anonymously given away Christmas baskets during the hardest years.

Roberts performed in Palm Beach and New York City Society Dinner Parties. Roberts frequently helped New York Society ladies with charity entertainment both by performing at charity events and by instructing society ladies in dance for their own benefit performances.

More than 100 guests was a dinner-dance enjoyed Roberts playing in the dining salon and then on the top deck of the floating hotel, Amphitrite, at a party given by Mrs. James Deering in honor of Princess Rospigliosi. In addition to playing the piano and leading his band, Roberts would sometimes dance for guests, with mentions of such at parties of Mrs. W. K. Vanderbilt 2d particularly noted in newspapers.

Throughout his life, Roberts earned money through side occupations of dancing, playing pool, and giving instruction in music, dance, boxing, and swimming. The records of these engagements are scarce; however, the New York Times and the New York Daily News featured articles about his tutelage of the New York Society in dance, particularly to learn the Charleston. New York Society ladies, while at their summer homes in Palm Beach, were putting on a special charity event version of the Ziegfeld Follies, with Society Ladies performing alongside a few Ziegfeld girls in dance routines. Roberts was employed to teach dance to these members of the Social Registered Aristocracy.

Among his students were Mr. and Mrs. Joshua S. Cosden, Mrs. Louis G. Kaufman, Mrs. William K. Dick (Madeleine Force, the former widow Mrs. John Jacob Astor), Mrs. Theodore Frelinghuysen, Mr. and Mrs. Edward F. Hutton, Countess Salm, Mr. and Mrs. J. J. O'Brien, Florenz Ziegfeld, Billie Burke, wife of Florenz Ziegfeld Jr., Harold Vanderbilt, Mrs. A. J. Drexel Jr. and Major and Mrs. Barclay Warburton, Mrs. Frederick Frelinghuysen, Mr. and Mrs. Robert Breese, Mrs. Ernest Gagne, Rodman Wanamaker, Paris Singer, Mrs. Edward Shearson, Mrs. Gurne Munn, and Marilyn Miller.

Roberts returned to New York after the season, and resumed teaching society there alongside Paul Bass. Grace Robinson, of the New York Times wrote:

“Magnolia” was linked to the Charleston dance style and enjoyed popularity among the elite residents in Fifth Avenue, creating royalty streams for the song’s co-composers, Lucky Roberts and Paul Bass.

Roberts relayed that Mrs. Louis G. Kaufman was his most proficient pupil, and was learning the 30 original Charleston steps and their 1000 variations, including the camel walk, the Charleston kick, the scissors step, and falling off the log and tap.

Roberts suggested that Palm Beach lessons were easier because the Palm Beachites practiced in bathing suits after their morning dip, a costume that "afforded freedom of movement". Roberts explained when the number called on dancers to "droop their knees" that the ladies "knocked their kneebones together almost as well as Paul or I could do it." Roberts is quoted: "It takes a lot of patience to teach these here society folks," admits Lucky. "But once they get the swing of it, there's no stopping them."

=== World War II (1939–1945) ===
Thirty years after composing the syncopated tune "Ripple of the Nile" (1912), which proved too difficult for most players of the day and was not copyrighted or published, Roberts drastically slowed the tempo around 1940 to teach it to a student. Realizing that it sounded good as a ballad, he collaborated with Kim Gannon to add lyrics and published it under a new title, "Moonlight Cocktail".

MOONLIGHT COCKTAILS

Couple of jiggers of moonlight and add a star
Pour in the blue of a June night and one guitar
Mix in a couple of dreamers and there you are
Lovers hail the Moonlight Cocktail
Now add a couple of flowers, a drop of dew
Stir for a couple of hours 'til dreams come true
Adds to the number of kisses, it's up to you
Moonlight Cocktail, need a few
Cool it in the summer breeze
Serve it in the starlight underneath the trees
You'll discover tricks like these 
Are sure to make your Moonlight Cocktail please
Follow the simple directions and they will bring
Life of another complexion where you'll be king
You will awake in the morning and start to sing
Moonlight Cocktails are the thing
Follow the simple directions and they will bring
Life of another complexion where you'll be king
You will awake in the morning and start to sing
Moonlight Cocktails are the thing

Glenn Miller and his orchestra performed the number first on New York's station WABC, and it rapidly became among top ten on Hit Parade. "Moonlight Cocktail" was recorded by the Glenn Miller Orchestra with vocal support by Ray Eberle and the Modernaires, and was the best selling record in the United States for ten weeks in 1942. "Moonlight Cocktail" was the number one American song hit of World War II and sold over one million recordings by Bing Crosby and Glenn Miller.

- "WATCH: Moonlight Cocktail, Glenn Miller and his Orchestra, Bluebird B-11401-A". Phonograph Man. September 18, 2017.
- "WATCH: Moonlight Cocktail, Glen Gray and the Casa Loma Orchestra, Decca 4114-B". Phonograph Man. September 18, 2017.

Its fast rise from No. 9 in March 1942 to No. 1 by May 1942 was hailed by Variety (magazine) as "No. 1 all over the nation"; Billboard (magazine), gave it a leading position for several weeks; and New York Enquirer, listed it as no. 1 in sheet music sales of the eastern states and the West Coast, and no. 2 in the Middle West. "Moonlight Cocktail" became the song of wartime America.

Through cards and letters, the armed forces voted Glenn Miller's recording of "Moonlight Cocktail" as No. 1 Hit of America, prompting an April 11, 1942 thank you from Glenn Miller. Mary Martin sang it on-air radio for Hollywood to the armed forces of the nation on April 18, 1942; soon after many celebrities performed and recorded it, including Horace Heidt, Tommy Tucker (bandleader), Joe Reichman and his orchestra, Dolly Dawn and Her Dawn Patrol.

=== 1940s–1960s ===
Roberts remained an active composer and performer his entire life. Notable compositions from his later years:

- "I Wonder (If You Can Be Happy Without Me)" (1936) collaboration with Louis B. Baratt
- "Teasin' Tessie Brown" (1938) Andy Razaf (lyric) collaboration with Jimmy Mundy
- "Whistlin' Pete" (1939)
- "Rainbow Land" (1942), Andy Razaf (lyrics)
- "Massachusetts", a Fox Trot (1942), Andy Razaf (lyrics)
  - "WATCH: Massachusetts 1942 Gene Krupa - Massachusetts (Anita O'Day, vocal)". The78Prof. June 25, 2019.
  - "WATCH: Massachusetts · Maxine Sullivan · Andy Razaf · Charles Luckeyth Roberts". Maxine Sullivan - Topic. February 4, 2020.
- "Lost in the Midnight Blue" (1942), a collaboration with J. C. Johnson
- "Exclusively With You" (1949)
- "Park Avenue Polka" (1949)
- "Inner Space" (c. 1950s)
- "Outer Space" (c. 1950s)

Reportedly with the income he earned from the sales of "Moonlight Cocktail" and another semi-popular song "Massachusetts", Roberts opened Luckey's Rendezvous [Rendezvous Inn, Rendezvous Club], (773 St. Nicholas Avenue) which quickly became an active as a venue for many styles of music, employing opera singers as waiters who also performed, jazz musicians, and a feature point of the evening entertainment being a solo piano performance by Roberts himself. He sold the venue in 1954. It's been said that Roberts had big hands, and an even bigger heart. Rumor was that he gave away so many free drinks that the business eventually failed.

Robert composed a classical, a three-movement Spanish Suite (1939), reworking earlier work "Spanish Fandango" as a movement. "Spanish Suite" was performed with symphonic orchestra in his Carnegie Hall concert, August 1939. Eleanore Roosevelt (Mrs. Franklin D. Roosevelt) was among his patrons.

July 1, 1940, Roberts was severely injured in an automobile accident: his jaw, his right hand, and both feet were broken.

Roberts composed "miniature syncopated rhapsody" for piano and orchestra called "Whistlin' Pete" (1941). Despite recent injuries and strokes, Roberts performed a full concert of his own compositions at the New York City Town Hall on May 28, 1941.

On 18 January and 8 February 1946, Roberts performed as pianist with an all-star traditional jazz group for the first two shows in the radio series This Is Jazz; and the following he recorded "Railroad Blues" and his five durable compositions: "Ripples of the Nile," "Pork and Beans," "Shy and Sly," "Music Box Rag," and "Junk Man Rag" for Blesh's Circle label.

His wife Lena Sanford Roberts died in 1958. In 1958, Roberts suffered a stroke shortly before recording an album, Harlem Piano Solos. Later, a second stroke impaired his control of his left hand.

As a businessman, Roberts became a millionaire twice through real estate dealings. He reportedly owned a bar in New York City and a restaurant in Washington, D. C. He was very generous throughout his life and had paid for a medical library at Harlem Hospital.

Very late in life, Roberts wrote two more musicals:

- Emalina
- Old Golden Brown

He died before they could be completed.

On February 5, 1968, Roberts died in New York City. He is buried at the Frederick Douglass Memorial Gardens in Bay Terrace on Staten Island, New York.

== See also ==
- List of ragtime composers

== Bibliography ==
- Jasen, David A.; Jones, Gene (2002). Black Bottom Stomp: Eight Masters of Ragtime and Early Jazz. Routledge. pp. 51–66. ISBN 0-415-93641-1.
- Scivales Riccardo (ed.), Harlem Stride Piano Solos, Katonah, New York, Ekay Music, 1990.
- Sampson, Henry T. (2014). Blacks in Blackface: A Source Book on Early Black Musical Shows 2nd Edition. The Scarecrow Press. ISBN 978-0-8108-8350-5.
- Roberts, C. Lucky, and Lester A Walton. Billy Boy. [, monographic. Walton Pub. Co., New York:, 1917] Notated Music. Retrieved from the Library of Congress, <www.loc.gov/item/2009371658/>.
- Fuller, Earl, Rector Novelty Orchestra, and Luckey Roberts. Pork and Beans. 1917. Audio. Retrieved from the Library of Congress, <www.loc.gov/item/jukebox-657116/>.
- Rogers, Alex, et al. I Got. 1923. Audio. Retrieved from the Library of Congress, <www.loc.gov/item/jukebox-67746/>.
- Hunter, Eddie, et al. I'm Done. 1923. Audio. Retrieved from the Library of Congress, <www.loc.gov/item/jukebox-68482/>.
- Amaturo, Matthew, et al. Railroad Blues. 1920. Audio. Retrieved from the Library of Congress, <www.loc.gov/item/jukebox-38055/>.
- Rogers, Alex, et al. Bootleggers' Ball. 1923. Audio. Retrieved from the Library of Congress, <www.loc.gov/item/jukebox-68611/>.
- Roberts, Luckey, et al. Rockaway. 1917. Audio. Retrieved from the Library of Congress, <www.loc.gov/item/jukebox-657190/>.
