= Moonlight Cocktail =

- Sheet music for Moonlight Cocktail

Song by Glenn Miller
- Released: 1941
- Recorded: 1941
- Genre: Jazz, Big Band
- Label: RCA Victor
- Composer: Luckey Roberts
- Lyricist: Kim Gannon

"Moonlight Cocktail" is a 1941 big band song recorded by Glenn Miller during World War II. The music was composed by Luckey Roberts and the lyrics by Kim Gannon.

RCA Bluebird 78, B-11401-A, 1941.

== Background ==
The song was originally recorded by Glenn Miller and his Orchestra on December 8, 1941, the day after the attack on Pearl Harbor. The 78 rpm disc was released by Bluebird Records as #11401. Vocals were by Ray Eberle and The Modernaires. "Happy in Love" was on the B-side. The song had its first public performance in January 1942 on WABC radio in New York City. It was the best-selling record in the United States for ten weeks, from February 28, 1942 to May 2, 1942, and was the number two record for that year after Bing Crosby's "White Christmas".

== Music ==
The music originated three decades earlier as a 1912 ragtime composition by Charles Luckeyeth Roberts called "Ripples of the Nile", described as "a syncopated tune that baffled the arrangers of the day". Roberts, known by his nickname of "Luckey" or "Lucky", was a composer with a career that lasted many decades. "Ripples of the Nile" was a musical challenge: "a fast number with right hand figuration of the greatest technical difficulty, and none of Luckey's pupils, including the great James P. Johnson, could execute it perfectly. Subsequently, he found it necessary to score it as a slow number, and publish it as 'Moonlight Cocktail'".

== Lyrics ==
The lyrics were written by New York attorney James Kimball "Kim" Gannon, who had dabbled with songwriting and poetry for years, before becoming a full-time songwriter when about 40 years old. Gannon, who wrote under the nickname "Kim", compared the development of a romantic relationship to the mixing of an alcoholic beverage in "Moonlight Cocktail". The following year, he wrote the lyrics to an even more enduring hit song, "I'll Be Home for Christmas".

== Critical reception ==
Billboard called "Moonlight Cocktail" a "smash hit" and wrote "It's one of the smoothest, danceable discs we've reviewed in many a moon. A rippling piano and tenor sax feature the orchestral arrangement and Ray Eberle and the Modernaires take care of the vocal". In a later issue, Billboard wrote that the song was "imaginative and colorful" and featured a "sweet harmony with a dish of romance".

During World War II, the BBC initiated a program called "Victory Through Harmony" that sought to use musical radio broadcasts to maintain wartime morale and increase weapons production. Some types of music were seen as a hindrance to such goals. Along with many other popular songs of the era, "Moonlight Cocktail" was banned by the BBC as "sentimental slush" in August 1942.

== Cover versions ==
Mary Martin sang the song on the radio for the troops. Within six months, cover versions were recorded by Bing Crosby (on January 27, 1942), Horace Heidt, Tommy Tucker, Dolly Dawn and her Dawn Patrol, Glen Gray, and Joe Reichman and his Orchestra.

Chico Marx performed the music on piano in the Marx Brothers 1946 film, A Night in Casablanca.

The song was later covered by Mel Tormé for his 1960 album Swingin' on the Moon, Michael Holliday for his album To Bing - from Mike (1962) and Stanley Black.

Nearly sixty years later, Andrea Marcovicci performed the song in her cabaret show "Double Old Fashioned", described as "piercing nostalgia leavened with humor".
