= Linda (1946 song) =

Popular song by Jack Lawrence

"Linda" is a popular song written and published in 1946 by Jack Lawrence. The song is notable for being named after then-one-year-old Linda McCartney.

== Composition ==
The song was written in 1942 when Lawrence was in the service during World War II, taking its name from the then one-year-old daughter of his attorney, Lee Eastman. (His daughter was Linda Eastman McCartney, future first wife of the Beatle Paul McCartney.)

The song did not get published until after Lawrence left the military, and was then recorded by a number of performers, but the biggest hit was by Ray Noble's orchestra (with a vocal by Buddy Clark). Other charted versions were by Charlie Spivak (vocal by Tommy Mercer); Paul Weston (vocal by Matt Dennis); and by Larry Douglas.

== Recordings ==
The recording by Ray Noble and Buddy Clark was recorded on November 15, 1946, and released by Columbia Records. It first reached the Billboard Best Sellers chart on March 21, 1947, and lasted thirteen weeks on the chart, peaking at number two.

The recording by Charlie Spivak was recorded on November 19, 1946, and released by RCA Victor Records. It first reached the Billboard on March 28, 1947, and lasted nine weeks on the chart, peaking at number six.

In 1962, Jan & Dean did a version of the song for Liberty Records that reached #28 on the Billboard Hot 100. Their next song, the #1 "Surf City", made them a surf duo but their previous work was primarily doo-wop/teen appeal.

== Namesake ==
Note: There is another song titled "Linda", written by Ann Ronell for the film score of The Story of G.I. Joe (1945). It was nominated for an Oscar.

== Recorded versions ==
- Marcus Belgrave
- Sam Butera
- Jimmy Clanton
- Perry Como – for his album Como Swings (1959)
- Priscilla Cory performed the song in the movie Deadman's Curve, the story based on Jan and Dean in 1978. Priscilla is the great-granddaughter of inventor Nathan B. Stubblefield.
- Bing Crosby – sang the song on three occasions on his radio show in 1947.
- King Curtis
- Dennis Day
- Dale Hawkins
- Jan and Dean – Jan & Dean Take Linda Surfin' (1963).
- Willie Nelson
- Ray Noble and His Orchestra (Buddy Clark vocal)
- Paul Petersen
- Jim Reeves – Girls I Have Known (1958).
- Line Renaud
- Frank Rosolino
- Bob Scobey
- Frank Sinatra
- Jerry Vale – I Remember Buddy (1958).
- Adam Wade
