= Buddy Clark =

American singer (1912–1949)

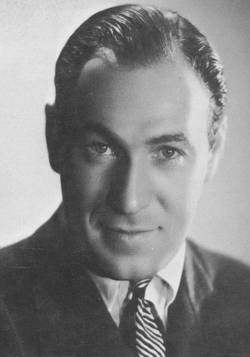
- Clark in a 1942 advertisement

Background information
- Born: Samuel Goldberg; July 26, 1912; Boston, Massachusetts, U.S.
- Died: October 1, 1949 (aged 37) Los Angeles, California, U.S.
- Genres: Traditional pop
- Years active: 1934–1949
- Label: Columbia
- Website: Buddy Clark biography on the Interlude Era site

Buddy Clark (born Samuel Goldberg, July 26, 1912 – October 1, 1949) was an American popular singer of the Big Band era. He had some success in the 1930s, but his career truly blossomed in the late 1940s, after his return from service in World War II, and he became one of the nation's top crooners. He died in a plane crash in 1949.

== Life and career ==
Clark was born to Jewish parents in Dorchester, Massachusetts, Tillie (Leibowitz), from Romania, and Nathan Goldberg, from Russia. He made his Big Band singing debut in 1932 as a tenor, with Gus Arnheim's orchestra, but was not successful. Singing baritone, he gained wider notice in 1934, with Benny Goodman on the Let's Dance radio program. In 1936 he began performing on the show Your Hit Parade, and remained until 1938. In the mid-1930s he signed with Vocalion Records, having a top-20 hit with "Spring Is Here". He continued recording, appearing in movies, and dubbing other actors' voices until he entered the military, but did not have another hit until the late 1940s.

In 1946 he signed with Columbia Records and scored his biggest hit with the song "Linda", recorded in November of that year, but hitting its peak in the following spring. "Linda" was written especially for the six-year-old daughter of a show business lawyer named Lee Eastman, whose client, songwriter Jack Lawrence, wrote the song at Lee's request. Linda Eastman grew up and married Beatle Paul McCartney.

1947 also saw hits for Clark with such titles as "How Are Things in Glocca Morra?" (from the musical Finian's Rainbow), which made the Top Ten, "Peg O' My Heart", "An Apple Blossom Wedding", and "I'll Dance at Your Wedding". The following year he had another major hit with "Love Somebody" (a duet with Doris Day, selling a million and reaching No. 1 on the charts) and nine more chart hits, and extended his success into 1949 with a number of hits, both solo and duetting with Day and Dinah Shore. He was also the narrator of the 1948 Disney musical anthology, Melody Time. A month after his death, his recording of "A Dreamer's Holiday" hit the charts.

== Death and legacy ==
On Saturday, October 1, 1949, hours after the 37-year-old had completed a Club Fifteen broadcast on CBS Radio with The Andrews Sisters—subbing for ailing host Dick Haymes—Clark joined five friends in renting a small plane to attend a University of Michigan vs. Stanford University college football game in Stanford, California. On the way back to Los Angeles after the game, the plane ran out of fuel, lost altitude, and crashed on Beverly Boulevard in West Los Angeles. Clark did not survive the crash. Clark's last radio broadcast found him in very high spirits, clowning with Maxene, LaVerne, and Patty Andrews. He joined them for a comical rendition of "Baby Face," during which Buddy amused the CBS studio audience, as well as the famous swing trio of sisters, with his spot-on Al Jolson impression.

The plane's pilot, James L. Hayter, later joined the U.S. Air Force and was involved in another accident in 1956. He later retired as a Lt Colonel and died in 2012.

Clark is buried at Forest Lawn Memorial Park in Glendale, California, near his widow and daughter.

Clark had previously been married to Louise Hitz, stepdaughter of famed hotelier Ralph Hitz in 1935. They had two children (Tommy and Katherine) together before divorcing in 1941.

Jerry Vale's first album, I Remember Buddy (1958), was a tribute to Clark.

For his contributions to the music industry, he has a star on the Hollywood Walk of Fame on 6800 Hollywood Boulevard.

== Hit songs ==
- "An Apple Blossom Wedding" (1947)
- "Baby, It's Cold Outside" (1949) (duet with Dinah Shore)
- "Ballerina" (1948)
- "Confess" (1948) (Duet with Doris Day, flip side of Love Somebody, Columbia 38174; also a hit for Patti Page)
- "Don't You Love Me Anymore" (1947)
- "A Dreamer's Holiday" (1949) (bigger hit for Perry Como)
- "Girl Of My Dreams" (with Mitchell Ayres and His Orchestra)
- "How Are Things in Glocca Morra?" (1947) (bigger hit for Dick Haymes)
- "I'll Dance at Your Wedding" (1947) (flip side of These Things Money Can't Buy)
- "I'll Get By (As Long as I Have You)" (with Mitchell Ayres & His Orchestra)
- "I Love You So Much It Hurts" (1949)
- "It's a Big, Wide, Wonderful World" (1949) (with Mitchell Ayres and His Orchestra)
- "Linda" (1947)
- "Love Somebody" (1948) (Duet with Doris Day)
- "Matinee" (1948)
- "May I Have the Next Romance?" (1936)
- "My Darling, My Darling" (1948) (Duet with Doris Day)
- "Now Is the Hour" (1948) (bigger hit for both Bing Crosby and Gracie Fields)
- "Peg O' My Heart" (1947) (bigger hit for Jerry Murad and the Harmonicats)
- "Powder Your Face with Sunshine" (1949) (Duet with Doris Day)
- "Rosalie" (with Mitchell Ayres & His Orchestra)
- "The Rhythm of the Rhumba" (Duet with Joe Host and the Lud Gluskin orchestra) (1936)
- "Serenade" (1948)
- "She Shall Have Music" (1936)
- "South America, Take It Away!" (with Xavier Cugat and His Orchestra)
- "Spring Is Here" (1938)
- "Take My Heart" (1936) (flip side of These Foolish Things)
- "These Foolish Things" (1936)
- "These Things Money Can't Buy" (1947) (flip side of I'll Dance at Your Wedding)
- "The One I Love (Belongs to Somebody Else)"
- "The Treasure of Sierra Madre" (1948)
- "Until Today" (1936)
- "Where the Apple Blossoms Fall" (1948)
- "You Are Never Away" (1948)
- "You're Breaking My Heart" (Orchestra & Chorus Conducted by Harry Zimmerman)
