= Symphony No. 2 (Henze) =

1949 symphony by Hans Werner Henze

Symphony No. 2 by Hans Werner Henze was composed in 1949 and premiered on 1 December that year in Stuttgart by the South German Radio Symphony Orchestra conducted by Hans Müller-Kray. The symphony is dedicated to the conductor Hermann Scherchen.

== Background ==
Henze began contemplating a new symphony early in 1949 and wrote to Wolfgang Steinecke, organiser of the Darmstadt Summer Courses for New Music, hoping for a performance at the course that year. Henze missed the deadline but a commission from South German Radio allowed him to continue and complete work on the symphony, which he did between May and August.

== Structure and style ==
For a New Year's Day 1961 performance, drastic cuts were made to the first and second movements. Henze later claimed that he "never undertook changes" to the symphony, but they persisted into the published score.

The final movement is in four sections: 1) slow and melodic, mainly for strings, 2) a march-like ostinato for the winds, 3) a second ostinato based on the B-A-C-H motif and 4) a final allegro which quotes Bach's cantata Wie schön leuchtet der Morgenstern. It concludes in a coda featuring a slowing of the tempo and finally four fortissimo chords made up of all 12 pitches of the chromatic scale.

Henze himself said that the symphony is "music for a winter's day, utterly grey and gloomy".
