= Rosalie Housman =

- Born: June 25, 1888; San Francisco, California, US
- Died: October 28, 1949 (aged 61) New York City, US
- Occupation: Composer
- Instruments: Piano, violin, viola, flute, and gong

Rosalie Housman (June 25, 1888 – October 28, 1949) was an American composer of mostly songs and chamber music, journalist, and lecturer. Many of her compositions were sung by notable musicians. She received praise and some criticism of her work.

== Personal life ==
Housman was born on June 25, 1888, in San Francisco. She studied at the University of California and in England. She was a pupil of Arthur Foote, Ernest Bloch, Oscar Weil, and Walter Henry Rothwell. Housman later lectured in the Eastern United States. She traveled back to San Francisco to visit until her death. She died on October 28, 1949, in New York City, at age 61.

== Career ==
Housman wrote more than 100 compositions, which were performed in a variety of concerts and on the radio in the United States and England. Three songs that Housman had composed were sung by Clarinda Smith, a soprano from New York, at the National American Music Festival. Some of her other compositions were sung by Florence Macbeth, Florence Easton, Greta Masson, Sara Teasdale, and Mary Jordan.

Housman interviewed composer E. Robert Schmitz for The Music News in 1921.

== Compositions ==
Housman wrote chamber music for the violin and piano, as well as wrote songs for the piano that also included choral music. She composed music for an entire synagogue service. Her composition Pieces of Jade was made for violin, viola, flute, gong, harp and soprano.

She wrote compositions for the poem Tora-Binder by Dhan Gopal Mukerji, the poem The Look by Sara Teasdale, and the Irish song The Rim of the Moon. Her compositions were sung by prominent musicians of the time.

Tora-Binder was written for a medium voice in multiple variations of tones and The Musical Monitor stated that, "The modulations in this song are quite remarkable; in fact, the whole harmonic design is full of color". The Look is for a coloratura voice and The Rim of the Moon is for a low voice.

== Reception ==
After reviewing three of Housman's songs, The Musical Monitor concluded with "All three songs spell success". Her work was praised by various musicians and publications, with reviews from The Music News, a Lockport daily newspaper, and from Carrie Jacobs-Bond, a composer who was the first woman to sell over a million copies of her own sheet music. Critics have stated that Housman "shows much originality in composition, adhering to the modern idiom, though occasionally reverting too strongly to change of key."
