= The Return of the Wayfaring Stranger =

Studio album by Burl Ives
- Released: 1949
- Genre: Folk
- Label: Columbia

The Return of the Wayfaring Stranger (Columbia Records C-186) is a 78-rpm set consisting of four 10-inch discs. Released in 1949, the album was concurrently presented as a 10-inch LP, assigned the catalog number CL-6058. On February 28, 1955, Columbia expanded to 12 inches The Wayfaring Stranger (monaural catalog number: CL 628; 1964 simulated-stereo catalog number: CS 9041), a Burl Ives album dating back to 1941, originally containing twelve tunes and initially called Okeh Presents the Wayfaring Stranger. Included in the 1955 collection were all nine songs from The Return of the Wayfaring Stranger. In August 1960, Columbia, using a slightly shortened title, Return of the Wayfaring Stranger, released a 12-inch LP of 13 different selections recorded by Burl Ives between 1949 and 1951. The 12-inch versions of The Wayfaring Stranger and Return of the Wayfaring Stranger were transferred to CD format by Collectables Records on November 14, 2000. Each disc contains bonus tracks. Currently, both CDs are in print.

== Track listing ==
The Return of the Wayfaring Stranger record 1 track listing
Side	Track	Song Title
1.	1.	On Springfield Mountain
2.	1.	Little Mohee

The Return of the Wayfaring Stranger record 2 track listing
Side	Track	Song Title
1.	1.	Troubador Song
2.	1.	Lord Randall

The Return of the Wayfaring Stranger record 3 track listing
Side	Track	Song Title
1.	1.	Bonnie Wee Lassie
2.	1.	Colorado Trail
2.	2.	Roving Gambler

The Return of the Wayfaring Stranger record 4 track listing
Side	Track	Song Title
1.	1.	John Hardy
2.	1.	The Divil and the Farmer
