= Alice Cucini =

Italian opera singer

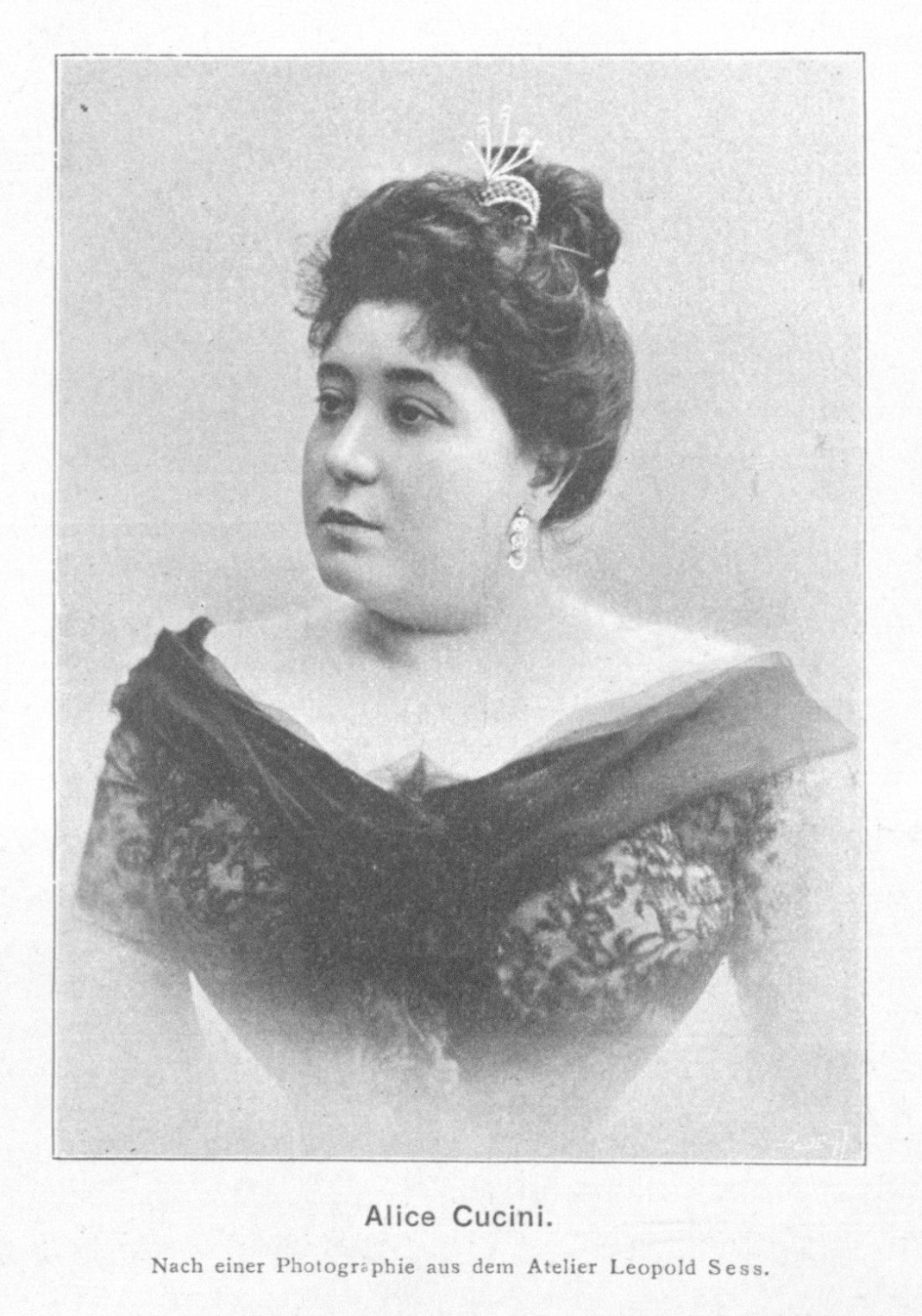
Alice Cucini in 1903

Alice Cucini (1870–1949) was an Italian contralto who had a prolific opera career in Europe and South America between 1891 and 1915. She was particularly associated with the role of Dalila in Camille Saint-Saëns's Samson et Dalila, which she sang in numerous houses internationally. Among the first generation of musicians to be recorded, her voice is preserved on some of the first Zonophone records ever made (1900), some Pathé recordings from 1902, and some His Master's Voice recordings made in 1906 and 1910.

== Biography ==
Cucini made her professional opera debut in 1891 at the Teatro di San Carlo in Naples as Lola in Cavalleria rusticana, a role which she repeated later that year at the Teatro Costanzi in Rome. She spent the next several years singing in performances throughout Italy, including productions in Trieste, Milan, Venice, and Florence. In 1897 she sang the role of Dalila in Camille Saint-Saëns's Samson et Dalila at the Teatro Regio di Torino to great acclaim. Cucini became particularly associated with this role and portrayed in numerous productions throughout the next fourteen years, including the Teatro Comunale di Bologna (1899), Teatro Donizetti di Bergamo (1900), Teatro Regio di Parma (1902), Teatro Colón (1910), and a few performances of the role in Spain.

In 1898 Cucini traveled to Russia where she sang in several operas in Saint Petersburg and portrayed the role of Gertrude in Ambroise Thomas's Hamlet in Odessa. In 1901 and 1902 she sang at the Teatro Colón in Buenos Aires and the Solís Theatre in Montevideo, notably portraying Amneris in Giuseppe Verdi's Aida and as Azucena in Verdi's Il Trovatore. This was the beginning of a fruitful career in South America that lasted until 1910. In 1903 Cucini made an extensive tour of South America with lauded soprano Hariclea Darclée. Over the next seven years she made frequent appearances in operas and concerts in major cities throughout South America. Her last season on that continent was in 1910 and was spent mainly at the Teatro Colón. That year she notably sang the title role in Gaspare Spontini's La Vestale and sang in the world premiere of Giocondo Fino's Il Battista along with Adelina Agostinelli and Giuseppe de Luca.

After 1910, Cucini spent the remaining part of her career singing in major opera houses throughout Italy. During the final four years of her career, the only major opera house In Italy she did not appear in was La Scala. She retired from the stage not too long after the outbreak of World War I. She spent her last few years at a rest home for aged musicians that Verdi had donated to the city of Milan. She died there in 1949 after a long illness.

== Sources ==
- Biography of Alice Cucini on Operissimo.com (in German). Accessed March 4, 2009.
