= David Stanley Smith (composer) =

American classical composer

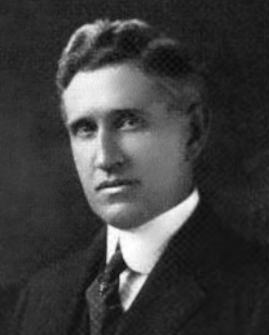
- Born: July 6, 1877; Toledo, Ohio, US
- Died: December 17, 1949 (aged 72); New Haven, Connecticut, US
- Education: Yale University
- Occupation: Composer

David Stanley Smith (July 6, 1877 – December 17, 1949) was an American composer.

== Biography ==
David Stanley Smith was born in Toledo, Ohio on July 6, 1877. He started his studies with Horatio Parker in 1895 at Yale University, where his friends included Charles Ives, and was appointed organist at the Center Church in New Haven. He traveled to Europe, and became the pupil of Ludwig Thuille in Munich and Vincent d'Indy in Paris. He returned to the United States in 1902.

On his return to New Haven in 1903, he taught music theory at Yale and succeeded Parker as the Dean of the School of Music, as well as the conductor of the New Haven Symphony Orchestra. Smith retired from Yale in 1946.

His compositions include: one opera, Merrymount; five symphonies (the last his opus 99, published in 1947); rhapsodies and impressions for orchestra; chamber music (including ten string quartets); choral music; anthems; songs; two violin concertos; and song cycles. He was a member of Phi Mu Alpha Sinfonia fraternity.
