= Ollantay (Ginastera) =

1949 orchestral triptych by Alberto Ginastera

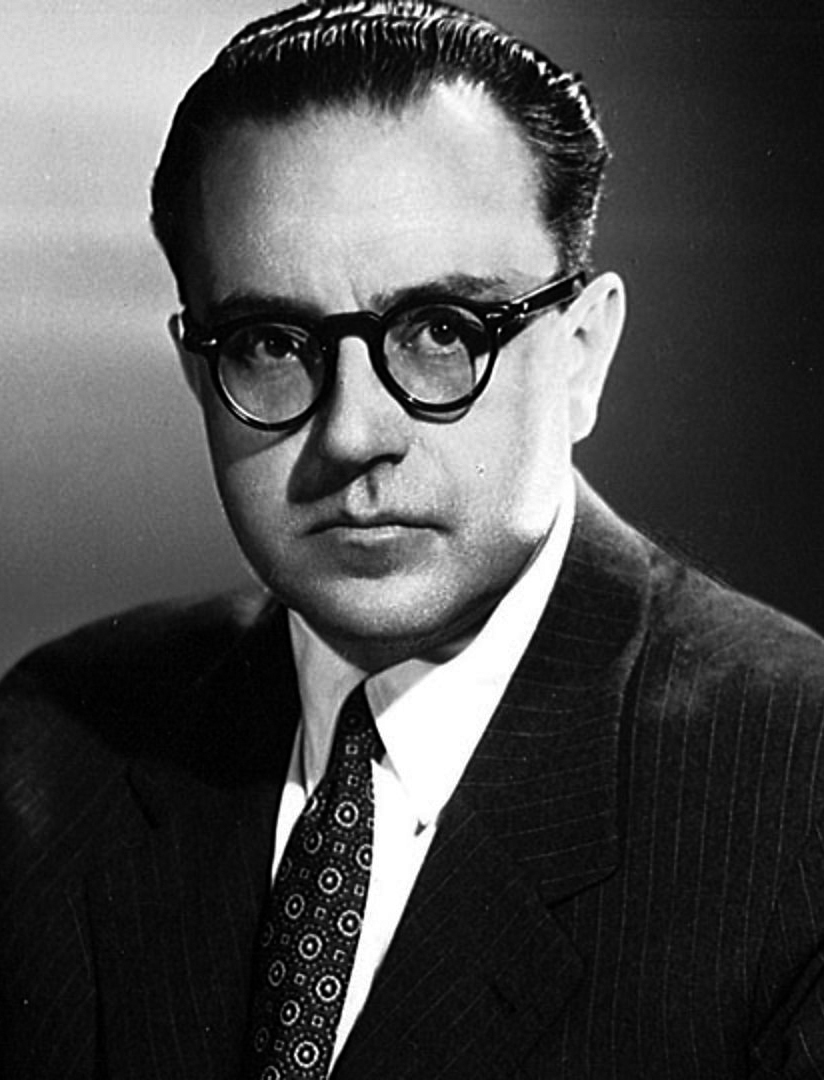
Alberto Ginastera

Ollantay: Tres movimientos sinfónicos, Op. 17, is an orchestral triptych by Alberto Ginastera written in 1947. It is one of the last compositions of his first period, objective nationalism (1934–48). It was premiered on October 29, 1949 in Buenos Aires by the Regular Orchestra of the Teatro Colón conducted by Erich Kleiber.

It has been described as a three-movement symphonic poem. Inspired in the Quiché mythological corpus Popol Vuh like his later homonymous cantata, Ollantay depicts the confrontation of the sons of the Earth and the Sun, commanded by Ollantay and Inca respectively, which ends in the defeat of the former after a long siege.

The work consists of three movements, to which Ginastera provided a short programme:

1. "Paisaje de Ollantaytambo". In the lonely night of Ollantaytambo, Ollantay emerges evoking the outcry of disappeared cities.
2. "Los guerreros". The warriors of Ollantay dance while they prepare for war. Excited, they imitate the armies in battle.
3. "La muerte de Ollantay". Prisoner of Inca, Ollantay forecasts the destruction of the Empire and the disappearance of the race of the sons of the Sun. Ollantay dies and solitude invades the Andine valleys.

== Critical evaluation ==
Guy Rickards from Gramophone describes it as a "darkly colourful and dramatic folk-triptych that could be thought of as an Argentinian Taras Bulba." Hubert Culot from MusicWeb International considers the work as "too little known, unjustly so," considering it "one of Ginastera's most appealing works."

== Discography ==
- BBC National Orchestra of Wales – Gisele Ben-Dor (Naxos)
- Louisville Orchestra – Louisville Orchestra – Jorge Mester (First Edition)
- Odense Symphony – Jan Wagner (Bridge)
- Poznan Philharmonic – Andrey Boreyko (Largo)
- BBC Philharmonic Orchestra - Juanjo Mena- Chandos Records (2015).
- Deutsche Staatsphilharmonie Rheinland-Pfalz - Karl-Heinz Steffens (Capriccio)
