= Mike Westhues =

American singer-songwriter

- Born: Michael Westhues; January 22, 1949; Moberly, Missouri, US
- Died: February 17, 2013 (aged 64) Espoo, Finland
- Genres: blues, folk, country, rock, jazz
- Instruments: guitar, vocal
- Years active: 1971–2013
- Labels: EMI, Love, RFD, Humble House
- Website: www.mikewesthues.com

Michael "Mike" David Westhues (January 22, 1949 – February 17, 2013) was an American singer-songwriter and guitarist, who made his home in Finland for 15 years.

Westhues was born in Moberly, Missouri. In 1971, he set off to see the world, ending up in Finland, where he was extremely active in the Finnish music scene, working with such groups as the Finnish progressive rock band Wigwam, its lead vocalist Jim Pembroke and Finnish blues artist Dave Lindholm. A couple of years later, Westhues moved to Uppsala, Sweden, then on to London and then back to Finland. At the end of the 1970s, he moved back to the US, to Indianapolis, with his Finnish wife and son. In 2004, they decided to move back to Finland, where he lived until his death in Espoo, on February 17, 2013.

== Discography ==
- New Morning Train, EMI Records, 1972
- A Man Name A' Jones, Love Records, 1974
- Good-Bye Rosalita, Love Records, 1976
- Jim/Mike And The Leadswingers, Love Records, 1977
- Vanha Isäntä, Hi-Hat Records, 1978
- Missin' Bill Blues, Tenex Records, 1982
- Frozen Hay, RFD Records, 1991
- Streetlight Reflections, RFD Records, 1993
- See Your Eyes, RFD Records, 1997
- Ain't No Money In Love, Instant Records, 2001
- Shades of Blue, Bluelight Records, 2007
- Dumbflakes for Breakfast, Humble House Records, 2008
- Alder Hill, Humble House Records, 2013
