= List of songs with lyrics by Johnny Mercer =

Johnny Mercer was known principally as a lyricist, but he also wrote music, even composing music for other lyricists. He had number one hits singing his own and other people's songs. Because Mercer wrote the lyrics to more than 1,200 songs, this is a partial list of his songs.

Year	Song title	Composer	Notable recordings
1944	Ac-Cent-Tchu-Ate the Positive	Harold Arlen	Bing Crosby and The Andrews Sisters No. 2 Billboard Charts 1945
1946	Any Place I Hang My Hat Is Home	Harold Arlen	
1945	Autumn Leaves	Joseph Kosma, original French lyrics by Jacques Prévert (English lyrics written by Mercer)	Title song sung by Nat King Cole from the film of the same name Autumn Leaves; Roger Williams No. 1 Billboard Charts 1955
1957	Bernadine	Johnny Mercer	Pat Boone (#1 Billboard charts for 1 week 1957
1941	Blues in the Night	Harold Arlen	
1946	Come Rain or Come Shine	Harold Arlen	
1939	Cuckoo in the Clock	Walter Donaldson	
1939	Day In, Day Out	Rube Bloom	
1962	Days of Wine and Roses	Henry Mancini	
1944	Dream	Johnny Mercer	The Pied Pipers (Billboard charts in 1945); Betty Johnson No. 9 Billboard charts 1958
1967	Drinking Again	Doris Tauber	
1946	Early Autumn	Ralph Burns and Woody Herman	Woody Herman, 1946
1940	Fools Rush In (Where Angels Fear to Tread)	Rube Bloom	
1902	The Glow-Worm	Paul Lincke, the original German lyrics by Heinz Bolten-Backers, English lyrics by Johnny Mercer	The Mills Brothers 3 weeks at No. 1 in 1952 (Billboard charts)
1936	Goody Goody	Matty Malneck	Frankie Lymon (#20 in the US and No. 24 in the UK
1943	Hit the Road to Dreamland	Harold Arlen	Featured in the film, Star Spangled Rhythm
1937	Hooray for Hollywood	Richard A. Whiting	
1941	I Remember You	Victor Schertzinger	Frank Ifield in 1962; No. 1 on the UK Singles Chart, No. 1 on the US "Easy Listening chart"
1942	I'm Old Fashioned	Jerome Kern	
1936	I'm an Old Cowhand from the Rio Grande	Johnny Mercer	
1951	In the Cool, Cool, Cool of the Evening	Hoagy Carmichael	
1938	Jeepers Creepers	Harry Warren	
1961	Love with the Proper Stranger	Elmer Bernstein	From the film of the same name, Love with the Proper Stranger
1954	Lonesome Polecat	Gene de Paul	From the film Seven Brides for Seven Brothers
?	Once Upon a Summertime	Eddie Barclay, Michel Legrand, Eddy Marnay	
1973	The Phony King of England	Johnny Mercer	From the Disney film, Robin Hood
1942	Skylark (song)	Hoagy Carmichael	Glenn Miller & His Orchestra with vocals by Ray Eberle; No. 7 on the charts in 1942.
1949	Moon Dreams	Chummy MacGregor, Johnny Mercer,	On the seminal Miles Davis album, Birth of the Cool
1975	I'm Shadowing You	Blossom Dearie	
1939	I Thought About You	Jimmy Van Heusen	
1954	Something's Gotta Give	Johnny Mercer	In 1955 both The McGuire Sisters, reaching No. 5 and Sammy Davis, Jr., reaching No. 9 in the Billboard charts
1944	How Little We Know	Hoagy Carmichael	Featured in the film To Have and Have Not
1944	On the Atchison, Topeka and the Santa Fe	Harry Warren	Johnny Mercer version of the song reached No. 1 on the Billboard magazine charts in 1946
1943	I'm Doing It for Defense	Harold Arlen	Featured in the film, Star Spangled Rhythm
1943	Old Glory	Harold Arlen	Featured in the film, Star Spangled Rhythm
1943	He Loved Me Till the All-Clear Came	Harold Arlen	Featured in the film, Star Spangled Rhythm
1943	On the Swing Shift	Harold Arlen	Featured in the film, Star Spangled Rhythm
1943	Sharp as a Tack	Harold Arlen	Featured in the film, Star Spangled Rhythm
1943	A Sweater, Sarong and a Peek-A-Boo Bang	Harold Arlen	Featured in the film, Star Spangled Rhythm
1958	Pipes of Pan	Saul Chaplin	From the film Merry Andrew
1958	Chin Up, Stout Fellow	Saul Chaplin	From the film, Merry Andrew
1958	Everything is Ticketty-Boo	Saul Chaplin	From the film, Merry Andrew
1958	You Can't Always Have What You Want	Saul Chaplin	From the film, Merry Andrew
1958	The Square of the Hypotenuse	Saul Chaplin	From the film, Merry Andrew
1958	Salud (Buona Fortuna)	Saul Chaplin	From the film, Merry Andrew
1944	G.I. Jive	Johnny Mercer	Johnny Mercer with Paul Weston And His Orchestra No. 1 for week
1935	Old Man Rhythm	Lewis Gensler	From the Astaire-Rogers film Old Man Rhythm
1947	Midnight Sun	Lionel Hampton and Sonny Burke lyrics written subsequently by Johnny Mercer	
1961	Moon River	Henry Mancini	From the film Breakfast at Tiffany's
1943	My Shining Hour	Harold Arlen	
1943	One for My Baby (and One More for the Road)	Harold Arlen	
1945	Out of This World	Harold Arlen	
1933	Lazybones	Hoagy Carmichael	Jay Wilbur, Paul Robeson, the Mills Brothers, Jonathan King
1941	Strip Polka	Johnny Mercer	
