= Stardusters =

American jazz vocalists

The Stardusters
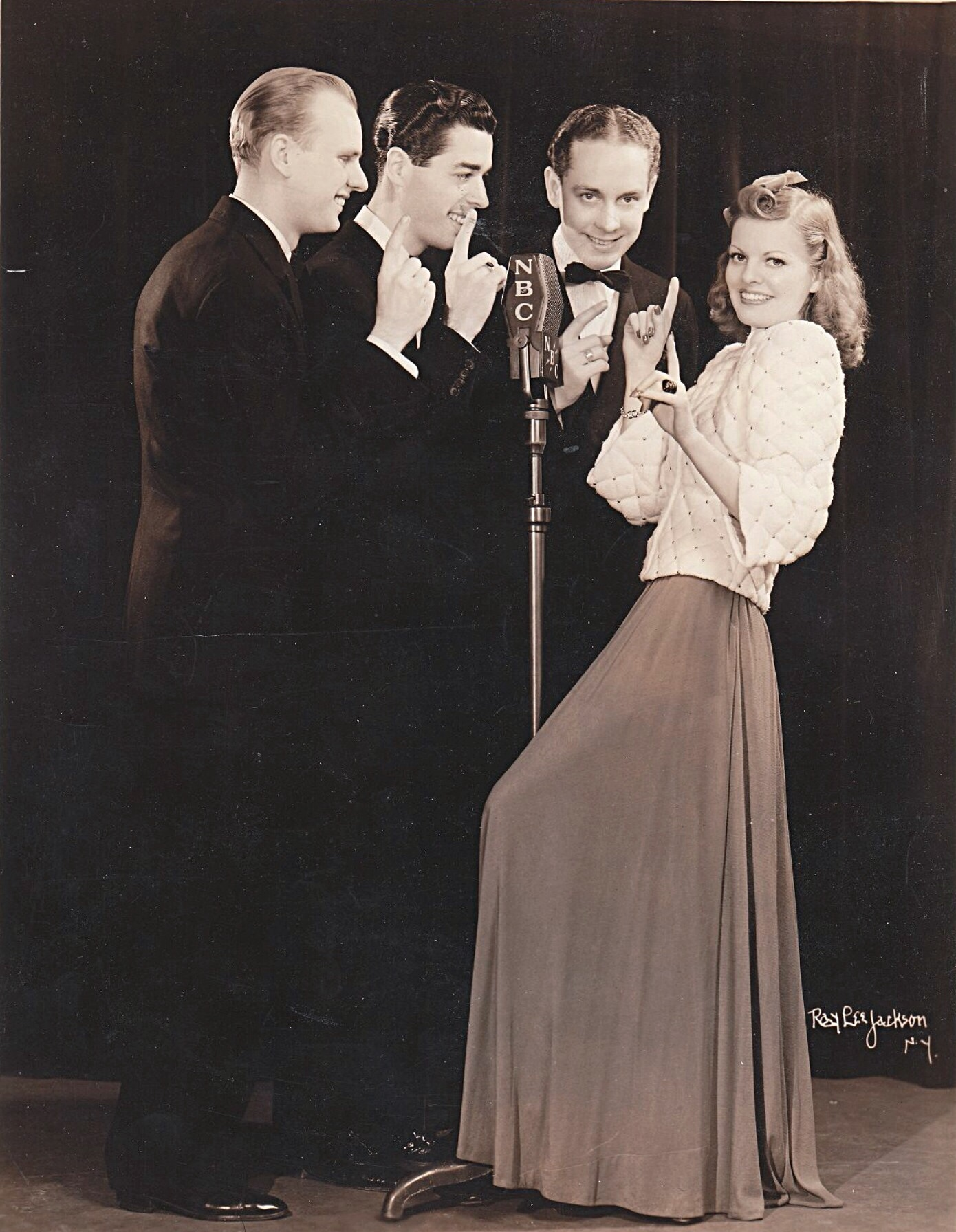
- The Stardusters with May McKim about 1940. From left: Glen Galyon, Curt Purnell, Dick Wylder, and May McKim

Background information
- Genres: Vocal jazz
- Labels: Swan, Decca
- Past members: June Hutton (1920–1973); Harry Glen Galyon (1914–1988); Ira Curtis "Curt" Purnell (1911–1982); Harry Richard "Dick" Wylder (1910–1963); Maureen O'Connor; Helen O'Connell (1920–1993); Irene Daye (1918–1971)

The Stardusters were American jazz vocalists.

== History ==
The Stardusters were founded as a male trio in the mid-1930s. Glen Galyon, Curt Purnell, and Dick Wylder had already established themselves in 1936 as the Stardusters, and in 1939, were featured on NBC radio: The Vitalis Show, featuring George Jessel and his Celebrated Guests. They were also featured in late 1939 and early 1940 with Frank Novak and his Music Creators on the Chiclets program heard over NBC.

May McKim — who had been a singer with an orchestra when she met Curt Purnell, married him on August 10, 1936, in Boston, and settled down to a non-professional home life — eventually joined the trio as a permanent member sometime around 1939. May and Curt divorced in August 1941.

In 1941, Charlie Spivak hired the group, but added June Hutton. The arrangements featured Hutton backed by the trio. While with Spivak's Orchestra, the Stardusters recorded with Glenn Miller (1941), Jimmy Dorsey (1941), and Jack Teagarden and His Orchestra (1941). The group later went on to record with Billie Holiday (1948) and Stan Kenton (1957).

The Stardusters had two notable hits, Brother Bill, and This is no Laughing Matter. And, they sang backup for Evelyn Knight's hit, A Little Bird Told Me, Decca Records, which became the subject of a landmark court case over covering.

- see Federal court case over "covering"

== Personnel ==
- May McKim (née Arvilla May McKim; 1917–2004), vocal
- June Hutton (1920–1973), vocal †
- Harry Glen Galyon (1914–1988), vocal
- Ira Curtis "Curt" Purnell (1911–1982), vocal
- Harry Richard "Dick" Wylder (1910–1963), vocal
- Sonny Burke (1914–1980), arranger

Also

- Maureen O'Connor, vocal
- Helen O'Connell (1920–1993), vocal
- Irene Daye (1918–1971), vocal

† When Hutton left The Stardusters in 1944, Spivak brought in Gene Krupa's vocalist, Irene Daye, whom he later married.

== Selected discography ==
- The Stardusters, Swan 8000–8001 (1946)

1. Brother Bill
2. Crystal Paradise
3. Weekend In Havana
4. I Surrender Dear

- The Stardusters, Swan 8002–8003 (1947)

1. What Happened, Joe?
2. I Wasn't Born in Ireland
3. Yes, Yes, Honey
4. When You're Not There

- Billie Holiday with Bobby Tucker And His Trio, New York, December 10, 1948 Decca (original release)

Billie Holiday (vocal), accompanied by Bobby Tucker (piano), John Levy (bass), Denzil Best (drums), Mundell Lowe (guitar), The Stardusters (vocal quartet that included Johnny Eager, aka Johnny Parker)

W74650-A – Weep no More
W74651-A – Girls Were Made to Take Care of Boys
(other tracks did not include The Stardusters)

== Filmography ==
- Pin Up Girl (1944 film) Wikipedia page

Re-released by 20th Century Fox Home Entertainment (DVD) (2006); OCLC 63542807
Re-released by 20th Century Fox Home Entertainment (DVD) (2007); OCLC 859424016

- Trocadero (1944 film) Wikipedia page

Re-released by Mill Creek Entertainment (DVD) (2005); OCLC 182760657
Re-released by Mill Creek Entertainment (DVD) (2009); OCLC 688501088

- Slightly Terrific (1944 film) IMDb: Slightly Terrific
- Beauty Shoppe (1938 short feature) at IMDb (currently a Lost Film); OCLC 79297256
- Salt Shakers (1938 short feature) at IMDb (currently a Lost Film)
- Dave Apollon and His Club Casanova Orchestra (1939 short feature) at IMDb; OCLC 82681200
