= Corky Cornelius =

American jazz musician

Edward "Corky" Cornelius (December 3, 1914 – August 3, 1943) was an American jazz trumpeter.

Cornelius's father was a drummer who worked regionally in dance bands in Texas. He was born in Indiana and raised in Binghamton, New York, and began his career in the early 1930s, playing with Les Brown, Buddy Rogers, and Frank Dailey. He joined Benny Goodman's band early in 1939, and went with Gene Krupa when the drummer split off to form his own group.

While there, Cornelius met singer Irene Daye, whom he married soon after. He played with the Casa Loma Orchestra from 1941 until 1943, when he died suddenly of kidney failure. His widow, Daye, married Charlie Spivak, in 1950.

== General references ==
- Eugene Chadbourne, Corky Cornelius at Allmusic
