= Tony Pastor (bandleader) =

Italian American novelty singer and tenor saxophonist (1907–1969)

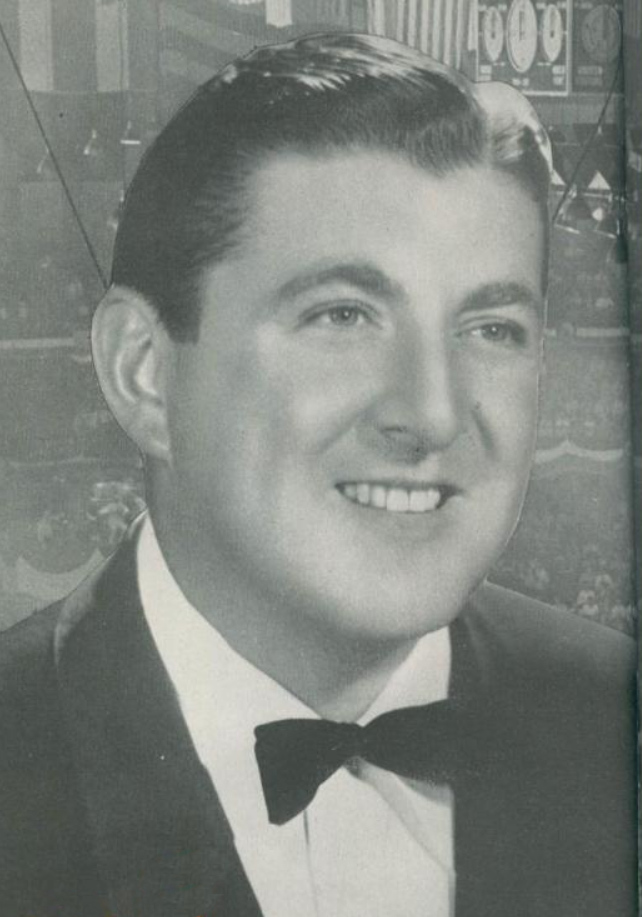
- Pastor in 1944

Background information
- Born: Antonio Pestritto; October 26, 1907; Middletown, Connecticut, U.S.
- Died: October 31, 1969 (aged 62) Old Lyme, Connecticut, U.S.
- Genres: Jazz, novelty songs
- Occupations: Singer, musician, bandleader
- Instrument: Saxophone

Tony Pastor (born Antonio Pestritto; October 26, 1907 – October 31, 1969) was an Italian American novelty singer and tenor saxophonist.

== Career ==
He was born in Middletown, Connecticut, United States. Pastor began playing saxophone when he was sixteen. He played tenor sax with John Cavallaro (1927), Irving Aaronson (1928–30), and Austin Wylie (1930), then opened his own night club in Hartford, Connecticut and led the band there for three years. After that, he played with Smith Ballew (1934), Joe Venuti, Paul Fredricks, Vincent Lopez, and Artie Shaw's first (1936–37) and second (1937–39) orchestras. In November 1939, when Shaw walked off the bandstand in the Cafe Rouge located inside the Hotel Pennsylvania (essentially quitting his own band), Pastor was soon coaxed into leading his own big band, which he did from 1939 to 1959.

== Radio ==
Soon after going out on his own, Pastor and his orchestra played at the Hotel Lincoln in New York City for seven months. That engagement included five broadcasts per week on NBC.

== Death ==
Pastor died of a heart attack in Old Lyme, Connecticut, at the age of 62.
