= The Pied Pipers =

American popular singing group (formed in the late 1930s)

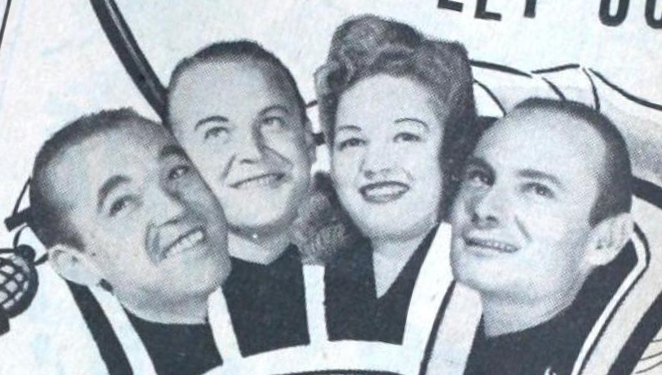
- The Pied Pipers in a 1945 advertisement (from left to right: Hal Hopper, Clark Yocum, June Hutton, Chuck Lowry)

Background information
- Origin: California, United States
- Genres: Popular music; big band
- Years active: 1938–present
- Labels: RCA Victor; Capitol
- Members: Nancy Knorr; Don Lucas; Kevin Kennard; Chris Sanders; David Zack
- Past members: Jo Stafford; John Huddleston; Chuck Lowry; Hal Hopper; Bud Hervey; George Tait; Woody Newbury; Dick Whittinghill; Spencer Clark; Billy Wilson; Clark Yocum; Frank Sinatra; June Hutton; Sue Allen; Virginia Marcy; Arthur Lambert; Louanne Hogan; Lee Gotch; Allan Davies

The Pied Pipers are an American popular singing group originally formed in the late 1930s. They had several chart hits throughout the 1940s, both under their own name and in association with Tommy Dorsey, with Johnny Mercer and with Frank Sinatra.

== Origins ==
Originally, the group consisted of eight members who had belonged to three separate groups: Jo Stafford from The Stafford Sisters, and seven male singers: John Huddleston, Hal Hopper, Chuck Lowry, Bud Hervey, George Tait, Woody Newbury, and Dick Whittinghill, who had belonged to two groups named The Four Esquires and The Three Rhythm Kings, all of whom were contributing to the 1938 movie Alexander's Ragtime Band.

Paul Weston and Axel Stordahl, who were arrangers for Tommy Dorsey's big band, heard of the group through two of The King Sisters, Alyce and Yvonne. Weston had a jam session at his home and a visiting advertising executive signed the octet for Dorsey's radio program, broadcast in New York City. They sang with Dorsey's orchestra for about six weeks before a British representative of the sponsor objected to some of the songs in their repertoire and fired them. They went back to California, but in the time they had been in New York had recorded two records for RCA Victor Records.

== Formation of the Pied Pipers quartet ==
While in Los Angeles, the group was on the threshold of disbanding when they received a call from Tommy Dorsey in Chicago who said he could not afford to hire eight Pipers. Instead, he would have them join his orchestra under the condition they cut the number of members down to a quartet. The group eagerly agreed. The quartet afterwards consisted of members Jo Stafford, her then-husband John Huddleston, and Chuck Lowry from the original eight, as well as a new addition: Billy Wilson.

In 1939, they moved to Chicago, with Clark Yocum, who had played guitar and sung for Dorsey, replacing Wilson. Although Paul Weston left Dorsey to become Dinah Shore's music director about that time, he was to figure in the fortunes of the group again.

In 1940, Dorsey hired another vocalist, Frank Sinatra, who had previously sung in a quartet, The Hoboken Four, and later with Harry James' orchestra. Sinatra and the Pipers teamed to record a major hit, "I'll Never Smile Again", in that year. The group had twelve more chart hits with Dorsey, ten of them with Sinatra. Also, Jo Stafford herself had a solo hit, "Yes Indeed" in 1941.

== Los Angeles years ==
Around Thanksgiving 1942, Tommy Dorsey (who was prone to incidents of bad temper) became angry at one of the Pipers for sending him in the wrong direction at a railroad station in Portland, Oregon, and fired him. The Pipers, out of "team loyalty," resigned en masse. At that moment, the No. 1 record on the charts was "There Are Such Things" sung by Frank Sinatra and the Pied Pipers, the last RCA record they did with Dorsey.

They returned to Los Angeles and signed with Capitol Records, where Paul Weston was now working, and he became the arranger and orchestra leader for most of the Pipers' recordings. Huddleston left to join the war effort (he was divorced from Stafford around that time), and Hal Hopper rejoined the group to replace him. The group also backed Johnny Mercer on a number of sides. In 1944 Jo Stafford had a hit on her own, ahead of the Pipers, and after a couple more hits, she left for good to pursue a solo career. She was replaced in May by June Hutton, who had been singing with the Stardusters.

The Pipers had twelve charted hit singles on Capitol, including "Dream" and ending with "My Happiness" (biggest hit version by Jon and Sondra Steele, later made popular again by Connie Francis) in 1948. They also continued a relationship with Frank Sinatra, doing several tours with him starting in 1945 and becoming a regular on his radio program from 1945 to 1947.

== Radio ==
In 1944, The Pied Pipers were regulars on Johnny Mercer’s Chesterfield Music Shop on the NBC Radio Network Monday through Friday nights. Beginning March 30, 1948, the group became a part of Club Fifteen on CBS. They sang on the program's Tuesday and Thursday episodes, alternating with The Andrews Sisters, who sang on Mondays, Wednesdays, and Fridays.

== Modern era ==
In 1950, June Hutton left the group and was replaced by Sue Allen and later by Virginia Marcy. (However, the trade publication Billboard reported that Virginia Maxie replaced Hutton in December 1949.) Hutton married Axel Stordahl, the other half of Dorsey's original arranging team. Just as Jo Stafford (who had married Paul Weston) had her husband's orchestra accompany her on her solo hits, June Hutton's solo hits on Capitol in the 1950s featured Stordahl's orchestra as backing group.

Louanne Hogan, who was the dubbed singing voice behind several movie stars, was briefly a member of The Pied Pipers in 1951. Lee Gotch, who had sung in the 1940s with the swing group Six Hits and a Miss, joined the Pied Pipers from 1954 to 1967, during which time he recorded an LP by Lee Gotch's Ivy Barflies. The Pied Pipers appeared on the December 12, 1955 episode "Ricky's European Booking" on TV's I Love Lucy.

The Pied Pipers sang on a few tracks of Frank Sinatra's 1950s studio albums, and backed up Sam Cooke on his No. 1 hit, "You Send Me".

Around the early 1970s Lynn Roberts sang with the group under the newly acquired name by Warren Covington in 1973.

=== 21st century group ===
The current Pied Pipers are Nancy Knorr, Don Lucas, Kevin Kennard, Chris Sanders, and David Zack. The group frequently performs with the Jimmy Dorsey Orchestra.

== Recognition ==
In 1944 and 1945, the group won awards from Down Beat magazine as the best and most popular group of the year. The group was inducted into the Vocal Group Hall of Fame in 2001.

== Recordings ==
The group was one of the early artists to return to recording at the end of the American Federation of Musicians' recording ban. Under the musical leadership of Johnny Mercer and Paul Weston, the Pied Pipers recorded singles and albums for Capitol Records in the mid and latter 1940s.

In the 1950s they recorded for Tops Records. In the 1960s they recorded for Warner Bros. Records and other companies.

=== Compilations in the modern era ===
- Capitol Collectors Series (Capitol, 1992)
- The Best of the Pied Pipers (Collectors Music, 1997)
- Whatcha Know, Joe? The Best of the Dorsey Years (Razor&Tie/BMG Special Products, 1999)
- Dream with the Pied Pipers (Living Era, 2005)
- Dreams from the Sunny Side of the Street (Jasmine Records, 2005)
