= Dream (1944 song) =

"Dream (When You're Feeling Blue)"

Song
- Written: 1944
- Published: 1945 by Capitol Songs
- Genre: Jazz
- Songwriter: Johnny Mercer

"Dream", sometimes referred to as "Dream (When You're Feeling Blue)", is a jazz and pop standard with words and music written by Johnny Mercer in 1944. He originally wrote it as a theme for his radio program. It has been and performed by many artists, with the most popular versions of this song recorded by The Pied Pipers, Frank Sinatra, and Roy Orbison.

== 1945 Recordings ==
- For Capitol Records, The Pied Pipers, with lead singer June Hutton, made a version of "Dream" (catalog number 185, with the flip side "Tabby the Cat") which became a major hit in 1945.
- A best-selling single by Frank Sinatra on Columbia Records (with the Axel Stordahl Orchestra and the Ken Lane singers; originally catalog number 36797, with the flip side "There's No You"; reissued as catalog number 40522, with flip side "American Beauty Rose") which spent 7 weeks on the charts, peaking at #5 in 1945,

== Other recordings ==
- Vocal group The Four Aces released a mid-tempo version in 1954.
- Vocal group The Skylines, singing with Ray Anthony's orchestra, revived this ballad in the 1955 Fred Astaire–Leslie Caron musical film, Daddy Long Legs.
- "Dream" was also recorded (on April 14, 1958) by Betty Johnson (issued by Atlantic Records as catalog number 1186, with the flip side "How Much") in a version that spent seven weeks on the charts: #19 on the Billboard chart of songs most played by disc jockeys and #58 on the Billboard top 100 chart. Roy Orbison included a cover of the song on his popular and critically acclaimed 1963 album for Monument Records, In Dreams. More recently, Orbison's version was resurrected for the soundtrack to the 1998 film, You've Got Mail.
- A lush version, with orchestrations and arrangements by Nelson Riddle can be heard on the 1964 Verve release Ella Fitzgerald Sings the Johnny Mercer Songbook
- A recording by Dean Martin was included on his 1958 album, Sleep Warm
- Frank Sinatra also recorded a new version of the song on his 1960 album for Capitol, Nice 'n' Easy
- Etta James on her 1961 album The Second Time Around
- Ringo Starr's version in 1970 album Sentimental Journey,
- Canadian jazz pianist and singer Diana Krall included the song in her 2017 studio album Turn Up the Quiet.
- John C. Reilly included the song in his 2025 album What's Not to Love?.
