= Trocadero (film) =

1944 film by William Nigh

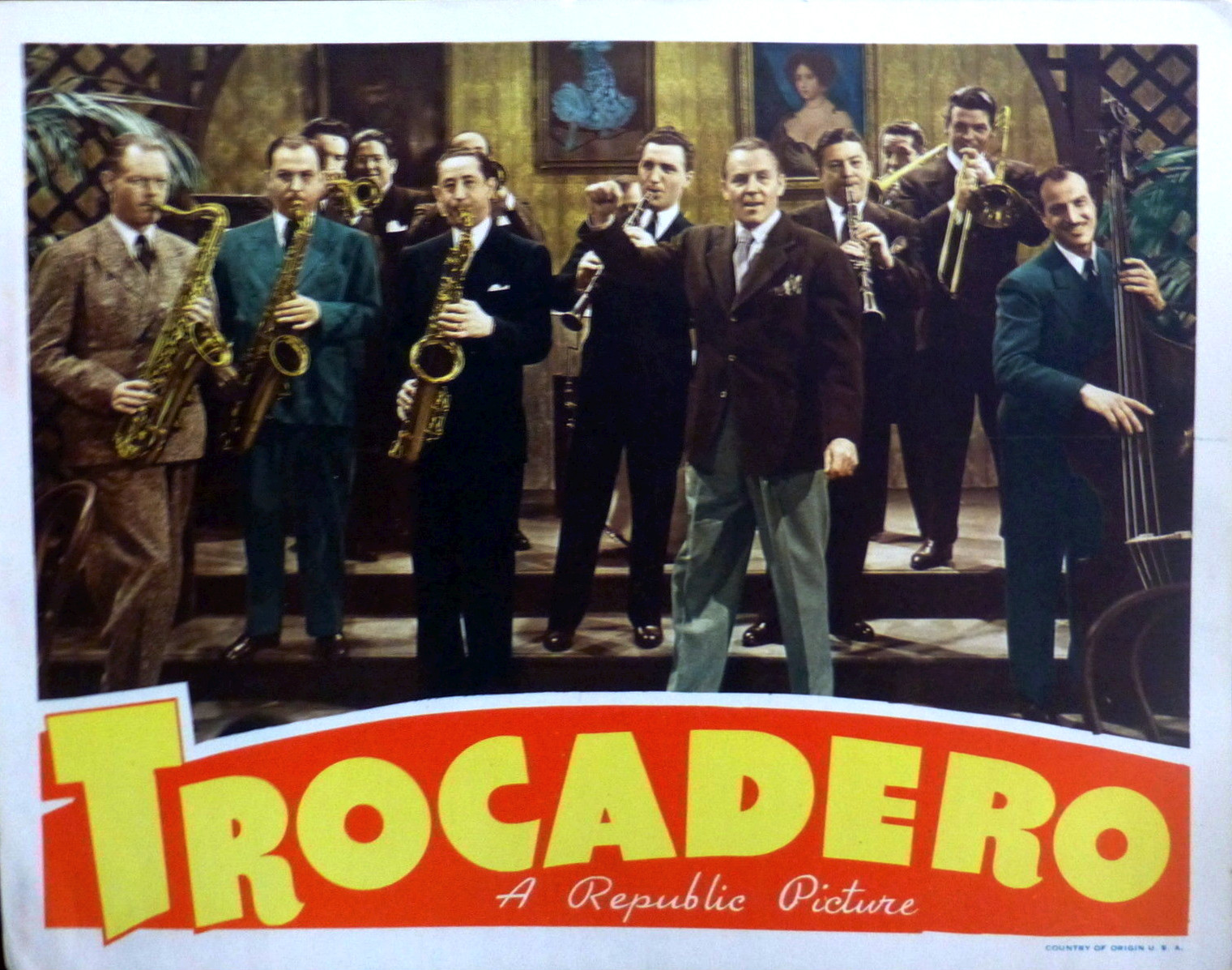
- Bob Chester and his Orchestra
- Directed by: William Nigh
- Written by: Charles F. Chaplin (story); Allan Gale (screenplay); Garret Holmes (story)
- Produced by: Walter Colmes (producer)
- Starring: Rosemary Lane; Johnny Downs; Ralph Morgan; Dick Purcell; Sheldon Leonard; Cliff Nazarro; Marjorie Manners; Erskine Johnson
- Cinematography: Jackson Rose
- Edited by: Robert O. Crandall
- Production company: Walter Colmes Productions
- Distributed by: Republic Pictures
- Release date: April 24, 1944 (United States)
- Running time: 74 minutes
- Country: United States
- Language: English

Trocadero is a 1944 American musical comedy film directed by William Nigh and starring Rosemary Lane, and Johnny Downs, Ralph Morgan, Dick Purcell, Sheldon Leonard, Cliff Nazarro, Marjorie Manners, and Erskine Johnson.

== Plot summary ==
The film is a fictional story of the creation of the Trocadero night club with the two foster children of Tony Rocadero erecting the club in their late father's memory. The film is meant to feature a variety of performers doing their act in the club, including an animated character from Dave Fleischer.

== Cast ==
- Rosemary Lane as Judy Edwards
- Johnny Downs as Johnny Edwards
- Ralph Morgan as Sam Wallace
- Dick Purcell as Spike Nelson
- Sheldon Leonard as Mickey Jones
- Marjorie Manners as Marge Carson
- Cliff Nazarro as Cliff
- Erskine Johnson as Erskine Johnson, Hollywood Columnist
- Dave Fleischer as himself
- Emmett Vogan as Carson
- Charles Calvert as Tony Rocadero
- Dewey Robinson as Bullfrog
- Ruth Hilliard as Nancy - cigarette girl
- Eddie Bartell as Master of Ceremonies and Radio Rogue member
- Bob Chester and His Orchestra as Themselves
- Matty Malneck as Matty Malneck
- Gus Arnheim as himself
- Eddie LeBaron and His Orchestra as Themselves
- Wingy Manone and His Orchestra as Themselves
- The Radio Rogues as Themselves
- Jimmy Hollywood as Radio Rogues Member
- Dick Carlton as Radio Rogues Member
- The Stardusters as Themselves
- Betty Bradley as Stardusters Member
- Jane Ellison as Stardusters Member
- Patricia Kay as Stardusters Member
- Ida James as herself
- Snippy as Animated Character created by Dave Fleischer

== Soundtrack ==
- "Trocadero" (Played over the opening titles and played by four orchestras in the finale)
- Cliff Nazarro - "Roundabout Way" (Written by Sidney Clare and Lew Porter)
- the Stardusters with Gus Arnheim and his orchestra - "Roundabout Way"
- Betty Bradley and Bob Chester and His Orchestra - "Bullfrog Jump" (Written by Lew Porter)
- Rosemary Lane and Johnny Downs - "How Could You Do That To Me" (Written by Lew Porter)
- Rosemary Lane and Matty Malneck and his orchestra - "Louisiana Lulu" (Written by Teepee Mitchell and Lew Porter)
- Wingy Manone and His Orchestra - "The Music Goes Round and Round"
- Rosemary Lane - "Trying to Forget" (Written by Tony Romano)
- "The King Was Doing the Rhumba" (Written by Lew Porter)
- Ida James with Bob Chester and His Orchestra - "Shoo Shoo Baby" (Written by Phil Moore)
