= Dick Whittinghill =

American actor and disc jockey (1913–2001)

- Publicity Photo of Dick Whittinghill
- Born: Noral Edwin Whittinghill; March 5, 1913
- Died: January 24, 2001 (aged 87)

Noral Edwin "Dick" Whittinghill (March 5, 1913 – January 24, 2001) was an American film and television actor, recording artist and radio DJ in the United States. His early music career included membership in The Pied Pipers vocal group which sang with Tommy Dorsey's big band.

Beginning in 1950, Whittinghill was for three decades the popular morning drive disc jockey at radio station KMPC in Los Angeles. During KMPC's heyday in the 1950s and 1960s, his fellow announcers included Ira Cook, Roger Carroll, Johnny Grant, Gary Owens, Johnny Magnus and Geoff Edwards. After his retirement, he was heard on a recorded Sunday program on KMPC, and later as afternoon drive personality at KPRZ, Los Angeles, reversing his traditional KMPC role, as former KMPC afternoon DJ Gary Owens was then KPRZ morning man.

Among the features of his program were the "story records," sent in by listeners, in which a short anecdote was completed with a line from a song. For example, the spider told Little Miss Muffet, "You can keep the curds but give me...All the Way (whey). (using Frank Sinatra's song).

Whittinghill had a minor national chart record. His narration "The Square" reached #144 on the Record World chart in May, 1965.

== Helen Trump ==
Whittinghill also spoofed the long-running radio serial, "The Romance of Helen Trent" with "The Romance of Helen Trump", written and narrated by Whittinghill and Foster Brooks. "Helen Trump" was "The story that asks the question 'Can a woman of 35?... 'Find love and romance with a man twice her age?'" One of Helen's suitors was a politician named C. Dewey Detterwick, with whom, Whittinghill said, Helen doesn't drive any more, because when C. Dewey drives, he sees spots—lonely spots.

== Television appearances ==
Whittinghill made television appearances as well, including a number of appearances on Dragnet in the 1960s, once as himself. A favorite of producer Jack Webb, he also appeared in a 1971 episode of Webb's Adam-12. He always signed off from his morning show with "I'm walkin' out the door, with you on my mind..." from the Nat King Cole record, "Walkin'". A sly punster and a master of double-entendre, longtime listeners knew that Montana-born Whittinghill was really "walkin' out the door with ewe on [his] mind".

His morning traffic reporter was Paul Pierce. Dick nicknamed him Panther Pierce. Whittinghill made great use of Freddy Fill and his Orchestra to fill the last few seconds of air time before news broadcasts. Upon his retirement from KMPC in August 1980, he was succeeded in morning drive by another legendary Los Angeles radio voice, Robert W. Morgan.

Whittinghill was inducted into the Radio Hall of Fame as of November 8, 2008.

== Discography ==
- The Romance of Helen Trump (A Soap Opera) (Dobre Records DR1062, 1978)

== Filmography ==
Year	Title	Role	Notes
1957	Calypso Heat Wave	Himself	
1957	Will Success Spoil Rock Hunter?	T.V. Interviewer	
1957	Short Cut to Hell	Mike Norden	Uncredited
1957	Jamboree	Disk Jockey KMPC Hollywood	
1958	The Geisha Boy	Reporter	Uncredited
1959	Say One for Me	Lou Christy	Uncredited
1959	The Five Pennies	Announcer	Uncredited
1959	A Private's Affair	Cpl. Henderson	Uncredited
1959	-30-	Fred Kendall	
1961	The Ladies Man	Man on Date	(scenes deleted)
1961	Bachelor in Paradise	Bruce Freedman	Uncredited
1961	The Errand Boy	Man in Screening Room	Uncredited
1961	Bachelor Flat	Radio D.J.	Voice, Uncredited
1962	Moon Pilot	Col. Briggs	
1962	It's Only Money	T.V. Speaker	Uncredited
1963	The Courtship of Eddie's Father	Radio Engineer	Uncredited
1964	The Lively Set	Himself	
1966	The Swinger	Television Crewman	Uncredited
