= Johnny Mercer =

American lyricist, songwriter, singer (1909–1976)

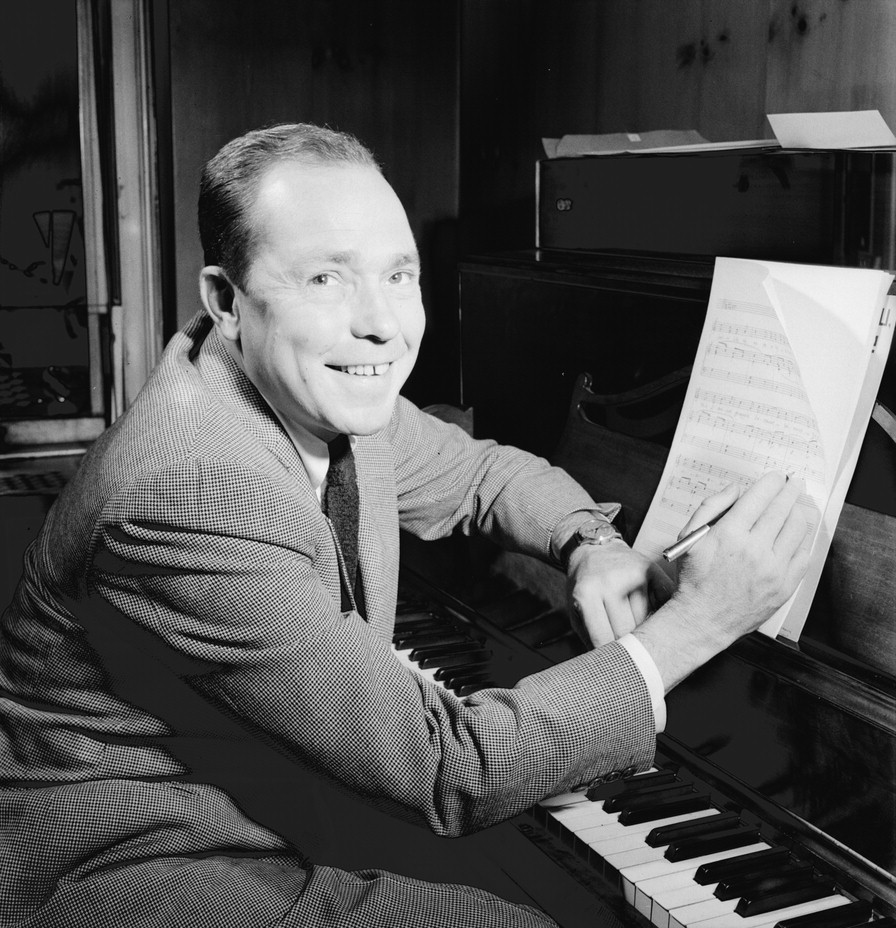
- Mercer, c. 1947

Background information
- Born: John Herndon Mercer; November 18, 1909; Savannah, Georgia, U.S.
- Died: June 25, 1976 (aged 66) Los Angeles, California, U.S.
- Occupations: Lyricist; songwriter; record producer; record label owner
- Instrument: Vocals
- Years active: 1930–1976
- Children: 2

John Herndon Mercer (November 18, 1909 – June 25, 1976) was an American lyricist, songwriter, and singer, as well as a record label executive who co-founded Capitol Records with music industry businessmen Buddy DeSylva and Glenn E. Wallichs.

He is best known as a Tin Pan Alley lyricist, but he sometimes composed music, despite not knowing piano or standard musical notation, and was a popular singer who recorded his own as well as others' songs from the mid-1930s through the mid-1970s. Mercer wrote the lyrics to more than 1,200 songs, including compositions for movies, Broadway shows, and well-known standards of the time, including "Autumn Leaves", "Days of Wine and Roses", "Hooray for Hollywood", "I'm an Old Cowhand" (music & lyrics), and "Moon River". He received eighteen Oscar nominations and won four Best Original Song Oscars.

== Early life ==
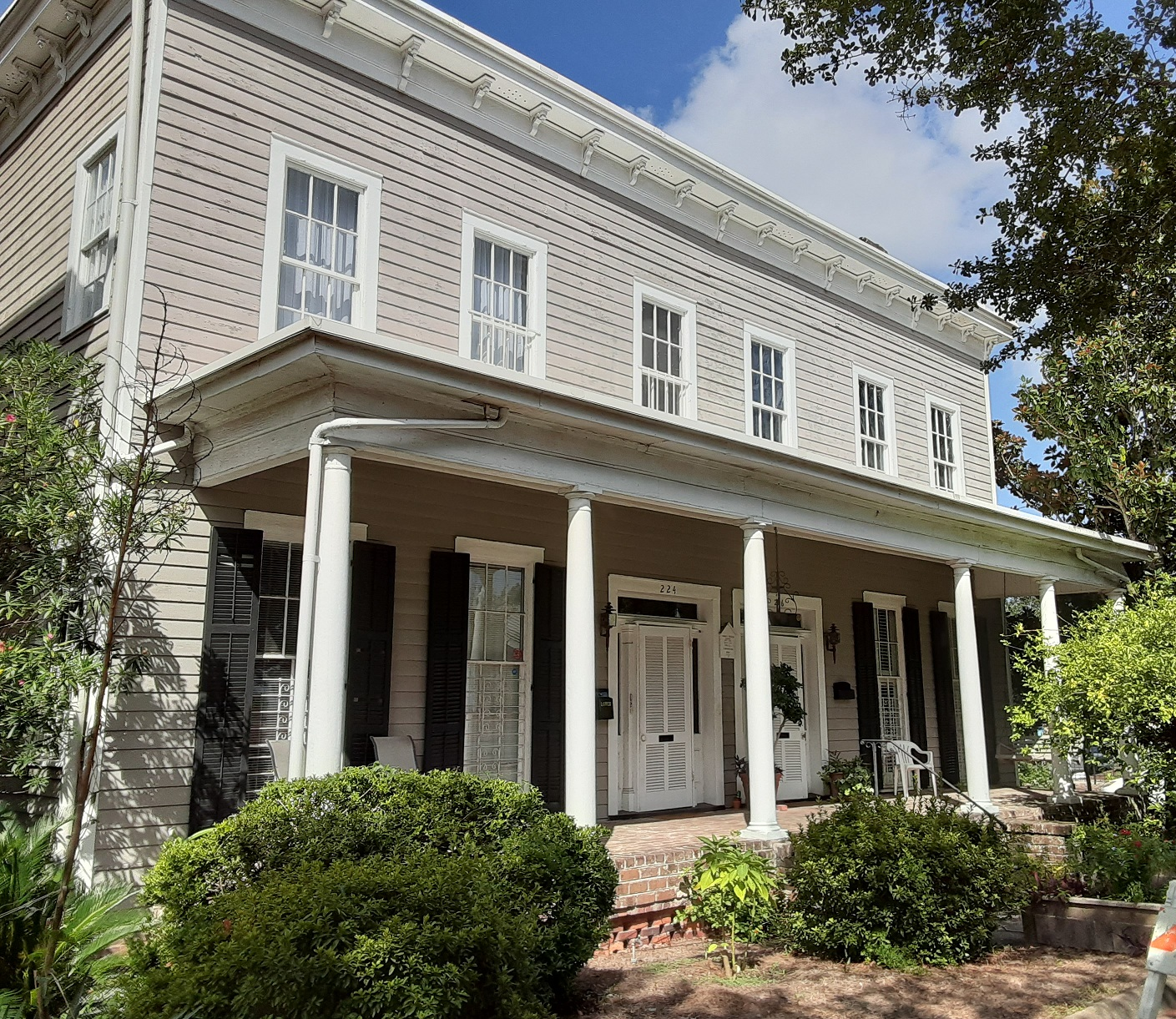
Mercer's childhood home, 224–226 East Gwinnett Street

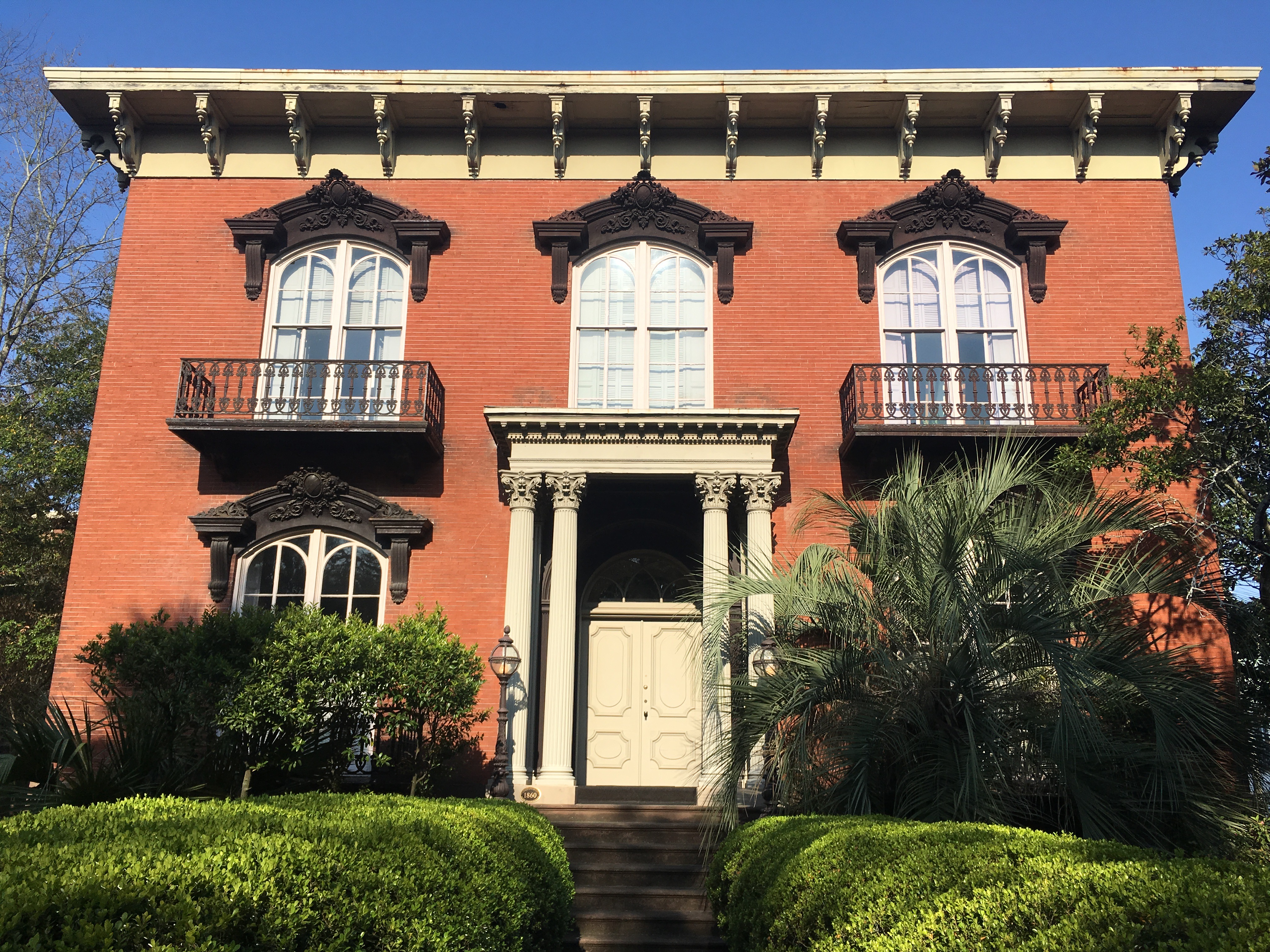
The historic Mercer House in Savannah, Georgia, built for the songwriter's great-grandfather. (Mercer did not live there.)

Mercer was born in 1909, in Savannah, Georgia, where one of his first jobs, aged 10, was sweeping floors at the original 1919 location of Leopold's Ice Cream. Mercer lived on Lincoln Street, a block away from the store's East Gwinnett and Habersham location.

Mercer's father, George Anderson Mercer, was a prominent attorney and real-estate developer. Mercer's mother, Lillian Elizabeth (née Ciucevich), was the daughter of a Croatian immigrant father and a mother with Irish ancestry. Lillian was the senior Mercer's secretary and second wife. Lillian's father, born in Lastovo, in 1834 to Ivana Cucevic and Marijo Dundovic, was a merchant seaman who ran the Union blockade during the Civil War. Mercer was George's fourth son and Lillian’s first. His great-grandfather was Confederate General Hugh Weedon Mercer and he was a direct descendant of American Revolutionary War General Hugh Mercer, a Scottish soldier-physician who died at the Battle of Princeton. Mercer was also a fourth cousin of General George S. Patton.

Mercer liked music as a small child and attributed his musical talent to his mother, who would sing sentimental ballads. Mercer's father also sang, mostly old Scottish songs. His aunt told him he was humming music when he was six months old and later she took him to see minstrel and vaudeville shows where he heard "coon songs" and ragtime. The family's summer home, "Vernon View", was on the tidal waters and Mercer's long summers there among mossy trees, saltwater marshes, and soft, starry nights inspired him years later.

As a child, Mercer had African-American playmates and servants, and he listened to the fishermen and vendors about him, who spoke and sang in the Gullah language. He was also attracted to Black church services. Mercer later stated, "Songs always fascinated me more than anything." He had no formal musical training but was singing in a choir by six and at 11 or 12 he had memorized almost all of the songs he had heard and became curious about who wrote them. He once asked his brother who the best Tin Pan Alley songwriter was, and his brother said Irving Berlin.

Despite Mercer's early exposure to music, his talent was clearly in creating the words and singing, not in playing music, though early on he had hoped to become a composer. In addition to the lyrics that Mercer memorized, he was an avid reader and wrote adventure stories. His attempts to play the trumpet and piano were not successful, and he never could read musical scores with any facility, relying instead on his own notation system.

As a teenager in the Jazz Era, he searched for records by early blues/jazz figures including Ma Rainey, Bessie Smith, and Louis Armstrong. His father owned the first car in town, and Mercer's teenage social life was enhanced by his driving privilege, which sometimes verged on recklessness. The family would motor to the mountains near Asheville, North Carolina, to escape the Savannah heat and there Mercer learned to dance (from Arthur Murray himself) and to flirt with Southern belles, his natural sense of rhythm helping him on both accounts. (Later, Mercer wrote a humorous song called "Arthur Murray Taught Me Dancing in a Hurry".)

Mercer attended the exclusive Woodberry Forest School in Virginia until 1927. Although not a top student, he was active in literary and poetry societies and as a humor writer for the school's publications. In addition, his exposure to classic literature augmented his already rich store of vocabulary and phraseology. He began to scribble ingenious, sometimes strained, rhymed phrases for later use. Mercer was also the class clown and a prankster, and member of the "hop" committee that booked musical entertainment on campus.

Mercer was already somewhat of an authority on jazz at an early age. His yearbook stated: "No orchestra or new production can be authoritatively termed 'good' until Johnny's stamp of approval has been placed upon it. His ability to 'get hot' under all conditions and at all times is uncanny." Mercer began to write songs, an early effort being "Sister Susie, Strut Your Stuff".

Given his family's long association with Princeton, New Jersey, and Princeton University, Mercer was groomed to go to school there, but those ambitions were dashed by his father's financial setbacks in the late 1920s. He went to work in his father's recovering business, collecting rent and running errands, but soon grew bored with the routine and with Savannah.

== Career ==
=== Starting out ===
Mercer moved to New York in 1928, when he was 19. His first few jobs were as a bit actor (billed as John Mercer). Holed up in a Greenwich Village apartment with time on his hands and a beat-up piano to play, Mercer soon returned to music. He secured a day job at a brokerage house and sang at night. Pooling his meager income with that of his roommates, Mercer managed to keep going, sometimes on little more than oatmeal. One night he dropped in on Eddie Cantor backstage to offer a comic song, but although Cantor did not use the song, he began encouraging Mercer's career. Mercer's first lyric, for the song "Out of Breath (and Scared to Death of You)", composed by friend Everett Miller, appeared in a musical revue The Garrick Gaieties in 1930. (Mercer met his future wife at the show, chorus girl Ginger Meehan; she had earlier been one of the many chorus girls pursued by the young crooner Bing Crosby.) Through Miller's father, an executive at the prominent music publisher T. B. Harms, Mercer's first song was published. It was recorded by Joe Venuti and his New Yorkers.

The 20-year-old Mercer began to frequent the company of other songwriters and to learn the trade. He traveled to California to undertake a lyric writing assignment for the musical Paris in the Spring and met his idols Bing Crosby and Louis Armstrong. Mercer found the experience sobering and realized that he much preferred free-standing lyric writing to writing on demand for musicals. Upon his return, he got a job as staff lyricist for Miller Music for a $25-a-week draw, which give him a base income and enough prospects to win over and marry Ginger in 1931. The new Mrs. Mercer quit the chorus line and became a seamstress, and to save money the newlyweds moved in with Ginger's mother in Brooklyn. Johnny did not inform his parents of his marriage until after the fact. In 1932, Mercer won a contest to sing with the Paul Whiteman orchestra, but singing with the band did not help his situation significantly. He made his recording debut, singing with Frank Trumbauer's Orchestra, on April 5 of that year. Mercer then apprenticed with Yip Harburg on the score for Americana, a Depression-flavored revue famous for "Brother, Can You Spare a Dime?" (not a Mercer composition), which gave Mercer invaluable training. While with Whiteman, he recorded two duets with fellow band member Jack Teagarden, "Fare Thee Well to Harlem" and "Christmas Night in Harlem". The latter was a best-selling record. After several songs which did not catch fire during his time with Whiteman, he wrote and sang "Pardon My Southern Accent" (1934). Mercer's fortunes improved dramatically with a chance pairing with Indiana-born Hoagy Carmichael, already famous for the standard "Stardust", who was intrigued by the "young, bouncy butterball of a man from Georgia." Mercer, later well known for rapidly writing lyrics, spent a year laboring over the ones for "Lazybones", which became a hit one week after its first radio broadcast, and each received a large royalty check of $1250. Mercer became a member of ASCAP and a recognized "brother" in the Tin Pan Alley fraternity, receiving congratulations from Irving Berlin, George Gershwin, and Cole Porter among others. Whiteman lured Mercer back to his orchestra, temporarily breaking up the working team with Carmichael.

During the golden age of sophisticated popular song of the late 1920s and early '30s, songs were put into revues with minimal regard for plot integration. The 1930s saw a shift from revues to stage and movie musicals using song to further the plot. Demand diminished accordingly for the pure stand-alone songs that Mercer preferred. Thus, although he had established himself in the New York music world, when he was offered a job in Hollywood to compose songs and perform in low-budget musicals for RKO, he accepted and followed idol Bing Crosby west.

=== Hollywood years ===
Mercer moved to Hollywood in 1935, and began writing music for films. His first Hollywood assignment was a B-movie college musical, Old Man Rhythm, to which he contributed two songs and appeared in a small role. His next project, To Beat the Band, was a commercial flop, but it led to a meeting and a collaboration with Fred Astaire on the moderately successful song "I'm Building Up to an Awful Let-Down".

Mercer landed into a hard-drinking circle, and began to drink more at parties and was prone to vicious outbursts when under the influence of alcohol, contrasting sharply with his ordinarily genial and gentlemanly behavior. Often he would assuage the guilt he felt for this behavior by sending roses the following day to the friend or acquaintance he had treated unkindly while drunk. Ironically, he would later say that he found the Hollywood nightlife lacking: "Hollywood was never much of a night town. Everybody had to get up too early ... the movie people were in bed with the chickens (or each other)."

Mercer's first big Hollywood song, the satirical "I'm an Old Cowhand from the Rio Grande", was inspired by a road trip through Texas (he wrote both the music and the lyrics). It was performed by Crosby in the film Rhythm on the Range in 1936, and from then on the demand for Mercer as a lyricist took off. His second hit that year was "Goody Goody", music by Matty Malneck. In 1937, Mercer began working for Warner Bros., working with the composer Richard Whiting, soon producing his standard, "Too Marvelous for Words", followed by "Hooray for Hollywood", the opening number in the film Hollywood Hotel (1937). After Whiting's sudden death from a heart attack, Mercer collaborated with Harry Warren and wrote "Jeepers Creepers", which earned Mercer his first Oscar nomination for Best Song (1938). Another hit with Warren in 1938 was "You Must Have Been a Beautiful Baby". The pair also created "Hooray for Spinach", a comic song produced for the film Naughty but Nice in 1939.

During a lull at Warners, Mercer revived his singing career. He joined Crosby's informal minstrel shows put on by the "Westwood Marching and Chowder Club", which included many Hollywood luminaries. Mercer worked on numerous duets for himself and Crosby to perform: several were recorded, and two, "Mr. Gallagher and Mr. Shean" (1938) a reworking of an old vaudville song, and "Mister Meadowlark" (1940), became hits.

In 1939, Mercer wrote the lyrics to a melody by Ziggy Elman, a trumpet player with Benny Goodman. The song was "And the Angels Sing" and, although recorded by Crosby and Count Basie, it was the Goodman version with vocal by Martha Tilton and klezmer style trumpet solo by Elman that became a major hit. Years later, the title was inscribed on Mercer's tombstone.

Mercer was invited to the Camel Caravan radio show in New York to sing his hits and create satirical songs, like "You Ought to be in Pittsburgh", a parody of "You Ought to be in Pictures", with the Benny Goodman orchestra, then becoming the emcee of the nationally broadcast show for several months. Two more hits followed shortly, "Day In, Day Out" and "Fools Rush In" (both with music by Rube Bloom), and Mercer in short order had five of the top ten songs on the popular radio show Your Hit Parade. Mercer also started a short-lived publishing company during his stay in New York. Mercer undertook a musical, Walk with Music (originally called Three After Three), with Hoagy Carmichael, but it was critically panned and commercially unsuccessful.

Shortly thereafter, Mercer began working with Harold Arlen, who wrote jazz and blues-influenced compositions while Mercer wrote lyrics. Their first hit was "Blues in the Night" (1941), which Arthur Schwartz called "probably the greatest blues song ever written." They went on to compose "One for My Baby (and One More for the Road)" (1941), "Ac-Cent-Tchu-Ate the Positive" (1944), "That Old Black Magic" (1942), and "Come Rain or Come Shine" (1946), among others. "Come Rain" was Mercer's only Broadway hit, composed for the show St. Louis Woman with Pearl Bailey.

"On the Atchison, Topeka and the Santa Fe" with music by Harry Warren, was a big smash for Judy Garland in the 1946 film The Harvey Girls, and earned Mercer the first of his four Academy Awards for Best Song, after eight unsuccessful nominations.

Mercer re-united with Hoagy Carmichael with "Skylark" (1941). Ten years later, they wrote the Oscar-winning "In the Cool, Cool, Cool of the Evening" (1951).

With Jerome Kern, Mercer created You Were Never Lovelier for Fred Astaire and Rita Hayworth in the movie of the same name, as well as "I'm Old Fashioned".

Mercer founded Capitol Records in Hollywood in 1942, with the help of producer Buddy DeSylva and record store owner Glen Wallichs. He also co-founded Cowboy Records. As the founder active in the management of Capitol during the 40s, he signed many of its important recording artists, including Nat "King" Cole. It also gave him an outlet for his own recordings. His hit "Strip Polka" was its third release. But Mercer recorded not only his own songs but ones by others as well. His four million-sellers were his own "Ac-Cent-Tchu-Ate the Positive" and "On the Atchison, Topeka, and the Santa Fe", and two by other composers, "Candy" and "Personality". One recording of a song that has lived on is his recording of "Zip-a-Dee-Doo-Dah", written by Allie Wrubel and Ray Gailbert for Disney's 1946 movie, Song of the South. Mercer's recording was a top hit for eight weeks in December 1947 and January 1948, reaching number 8. Today it continues to be the version most played on Sirius's 40s satellite channel.

Mercer by the mid-1940s enjoyed a reputation as one of the premier Hollywood lyricists. He was adaptable, listening carefully and absorbing a tune and then transforming it into his own style. Like Irving Berlin, he was a close follower of cultural fashion and changing language, which in part accounted for the long tenure of his success. He loved many words (Too Marvelous for Words), including puns (Strip Polka), and current terms ("G. I. Jive"). He employed sound effects, as well, such as the train whistle sounds in "Blues in the Night" and "On the Atchison, Topeka, and the Santa Fe".

Mercer preferred to have the music first, taking it home and working on it. He claimed composers had no problem with this method provided that he returned with the lyrics.

Mercer was often asked to write new lyrics to already popular songs. The lyrics to "Laura", "Midnight Sun", and "Satin Doll" were all written after the melodies had become hits. He was also asked to compose English lyrics to foreign songs, the most famous example being "Autumn Leaves", based on the French song "Les Feuilles Mortes".

=== Radio programs ===
In 1943, Johnny Mercer's Music Shop was a summer replacement for The Pepsodent Show on NBC. Ella Mae Morse and Jo Stafford were regulars on the program, with musical support from The Pied Pipers and Paul Weston and his orchestra. The Chesterfield Music Shop, a similar program in a 15-minute version, was broadcast in 1944.

=== 1950s–1970s ===
In the 1950s, the advent of rock and roll cut deeply into Mercer's natural audience, and dramatically reduced venues for his songs. Mercer wrote for several MGM films, including Seven Brides for Seven Brothers (1954) and Merry Andrew (1958). He collaborated on three Broadway musicals in the 1950s—Top Banana (1951), Li'l Abner (1956), and Saratoga (1959).

His more successful songs of the 1950s include "The Glow-Worm" (sung by the Mills Brothers) and "Something's Gotta Give". In 1961, he wrote the lyrics to "Moon River" for Audrey Hepburn in Breakfast at Tiffany's and for Days of Wine and Roses, both with music by Henry Mancini, and Mercer received his third and fourth Oscars for Best Song. The back-to-back Oscars were the first time a songwriting team had achieved that feat. Mercer, also with Mancini, wrote "Charade" for the 1963 romantic thriller of the same name. The Tony Bennett classic "I Wanna Be Around" was written by Mercer in 1962, as was the Frank Sinatra hit "Summer Wind" in 1965.

Mercer was humble about his work, attributing much of his success to luck and timing. He was fond of telling the story of how he was offered the job of doing the lyrics for Johnny Mandel's music on The Sandpiper, only to have the producer turn his lyrics down. The producer offered the commission to Paul Francis Webster and the result was "The Shadow of Your Smile", which became a huge hit, winning the 1965 Oscar for Best Original Song. However, Mercer and Mandel did collaborate on the 1964 song "Emily" from the film The Americanization of Emily starring Julie Andrews.

In 1969, Mercer helped publishers Abe Olman and Howie Richmond found the National Academy of Popular Music's Songwriters Hall of Fame. In 1971, Mercer presented a retrospective of his career for the "Lyrics and Lyricists Series" in New York, including an omnibus of his "greatest hits" and a performance by Margaret Whiting. It was recorded live as An Evening with Johnny Mercer. In 1974, he collaborated on the West End production The Good Companions. He also recorded two albums of his songs in London in 1974, with the Pete Moore Orchestra and with the Harry Roche Constellation, later compiled into a single album and released as ...My Huckleberry Friend: Johnny Mercer Sings the Songs of Johnny Mercer.

Late in his life, Mercer became friends with pianist Emma Kelly. He gave her the nickname "The Lady of Six-Thousand Songs" after challenging her, over several years, to play numerous songs he named. He kept track of the requests, and estimated she knew 6,000 songs from memory.

=== Posthumous success ===
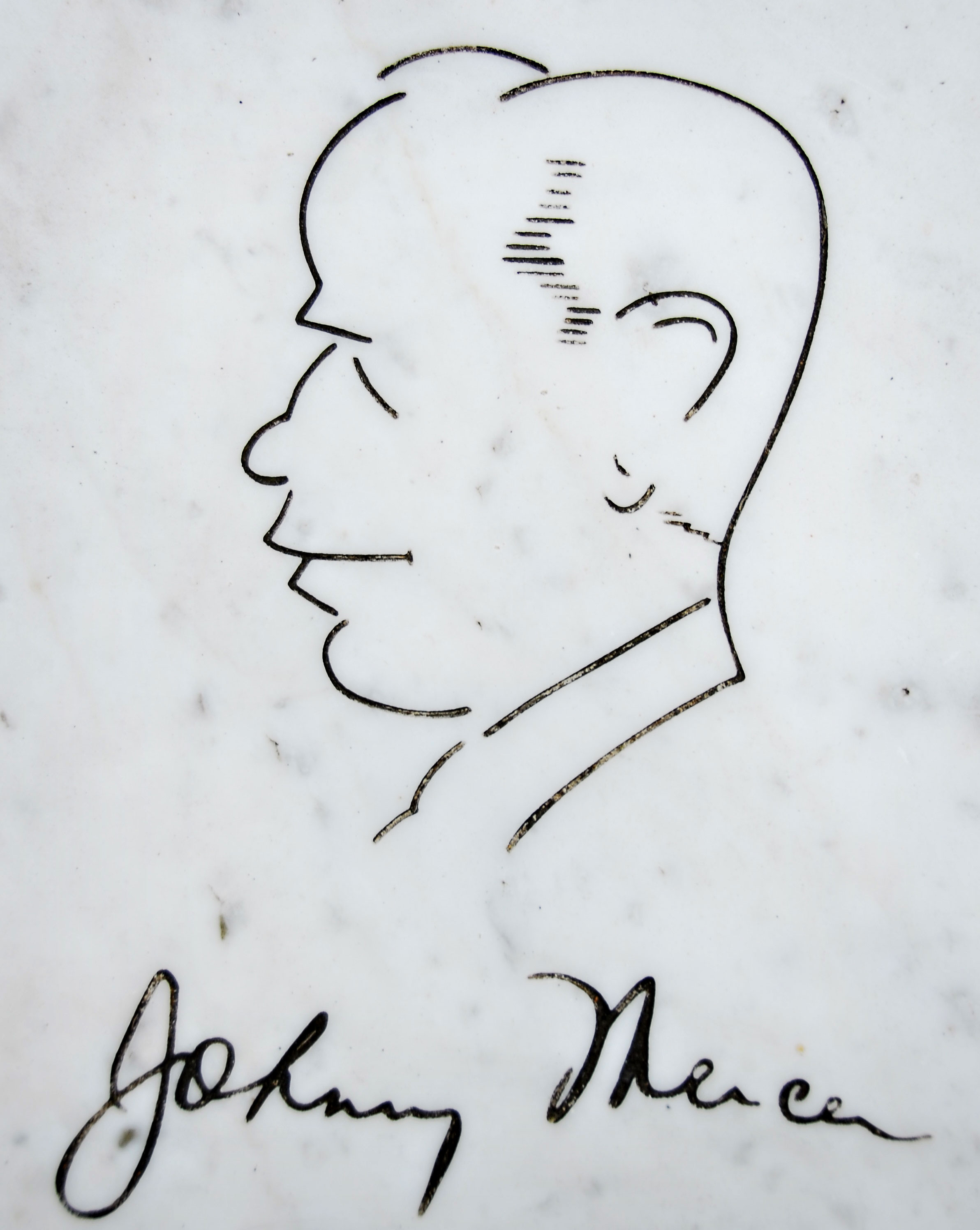
Self-portrait and signature of Johnny Mercer from bench at his grave in Bonaventure Cemetery in Savannah, Georgia

In the last year of his life, Mercer became fond of pop singer Barry Manilow, in part because Manilow's first hit record was "Mandy", which was also the nickname of Mercer's daughter Amanda. After Mercer's death, his widow, Ginger Mehan Mercer, arranged to give some unfinished lyrics he had written to Manilow to possibly develop into complete songs. Among these was a piece titled "When October Goes", a melancholy remembrance of lost love. Manilow applied his own melody to the lyric and issued it as a single in 1984, when it became a top 10 Adult Contemporary hit in the United States. The song has since become a jazz standard, with notable recordings by Rosemary Clooney, Nancy Wilson, and Megon McDonough, among other performers.

== Singing style ==
Well regarded also as a singer with a folksy quality, Mercer was a natural for his own songs such as "Ac-Cent-Tchu-Ate the Positive", "On the Atchison, Topeka and the Santa Fe", "One for My Baby (and One More for the Road)", and "Lazybones". He was considered a first-rate performer of his own work.

It has been said that he penned "One for My Baby (and One More for the Road)"—one of the great torch laments of all times—on a napkin while sitting at the bar at P. J. Clarke's when Tommy Joyce was the bartender. The next day Mercer called Joyce to apologize for the line "So, set 'em up, Joe," explaining "I couldn't get your name to rhyme."

ATCO Records issued Two of a Kind in 1961, a duet album by Bobby Darin and Johnny Mercer with Billy May and his Orchestra, produced by Ahmet Ertegun.

== Personal life ==
In 1931, Mercer married Ginger Meltzer, a chorus girl, later a seamstress. In 1940 the Mercers adopted a daughter, Amanda ("Mandy"). In 1960, Mandy married Bob Corwin, who was a pianist for Peggy Lee, Anita O'Day, and Carmen McRae, and also Mercer's long-time accompanist. They had a son, Jim Corwin, in 1961.

In 1941, Mercer began an affair with 19-year-old Judy Garland, while she was engaged to composer David Rose. Garland ended the involvement when she married Rose. In later years, Garland and Mercer rekindled their affair. Mercer stated that his song "I Remember You" was the most direct expression of his feelings for Garland.

Mercer died in 1976, aged 66, from an inoperable brain tumor, in the Bel Air neighborhood of Los Angeles, California. He was buried in Savannah's historic Bonaventure Cemetery. The line-drawing caricature adorning his memorial bench is a reproduction of a self-portrait.

== Awards and legacy ==
=== Academy Awards ===
Mercer won four Academy Awards on eighteen nominations for Best Original Song:

- 1946: "On the Atchison, Topeka and the Santa Fe" (music by Harry Warren) for The Harvey Girls
- 1951: "In the Cool, Cool, Cool of the Evening" (music by Hoagy Carmichael) for Here Comes the Groom
- 1961: "Moon River" (music by Henry Mancini) for Breakfast at Tiffany's
- 1962: "Days of Wine and Roses" (music by Henry Mancini) for Days of Wine and Roses

Mercer was also nominated for Best Original Song Score for the 1970 Mancini collaboration Darling Lili.

=== Other ===
In 1980, the Songwriters Hall of Fame established the annual Johnny Mercer Award as its highest honor, for songwriters with a history of outstanding creative works. Mercer was honored by the United States Postal Service with his portrait placed on a stamp in 1996. Mercer's star on the Hollywood Walk of Fame at 1628 Vine Street is a block away from the Capitol Records building at 1750 Vine Street.

In 1983, Mercer earned a posthumous nomination for a Tony Award for Best Original Score for his original lyrics and for Gene de Paul's original music and score with new songs by Al Kasha and Joel Hirschhorn for the stage musical Seven Brides for Seven Brothers at the 37th Tony Awards, but lost to Andrew Lloyd Webber and T. S. Eliot for Cats.

Mercer was given tribute in John Berendt's 1994 novel Midnight in the Garden of Good and Evil. The 1997 film adaptation directed by Clint Eastwood features prominently Hoagy Carmichael/Johnny Mercer song "Skylark", sung by k.d. lang. The movie soundtrack contains 14 Mercer songs performed by artists such as Alison Krauss, Paula Cole, and Cassandra Wilson; the film's star, Kevin Spacey, sang Mercer's 1942 hit "That Old Black Magic".

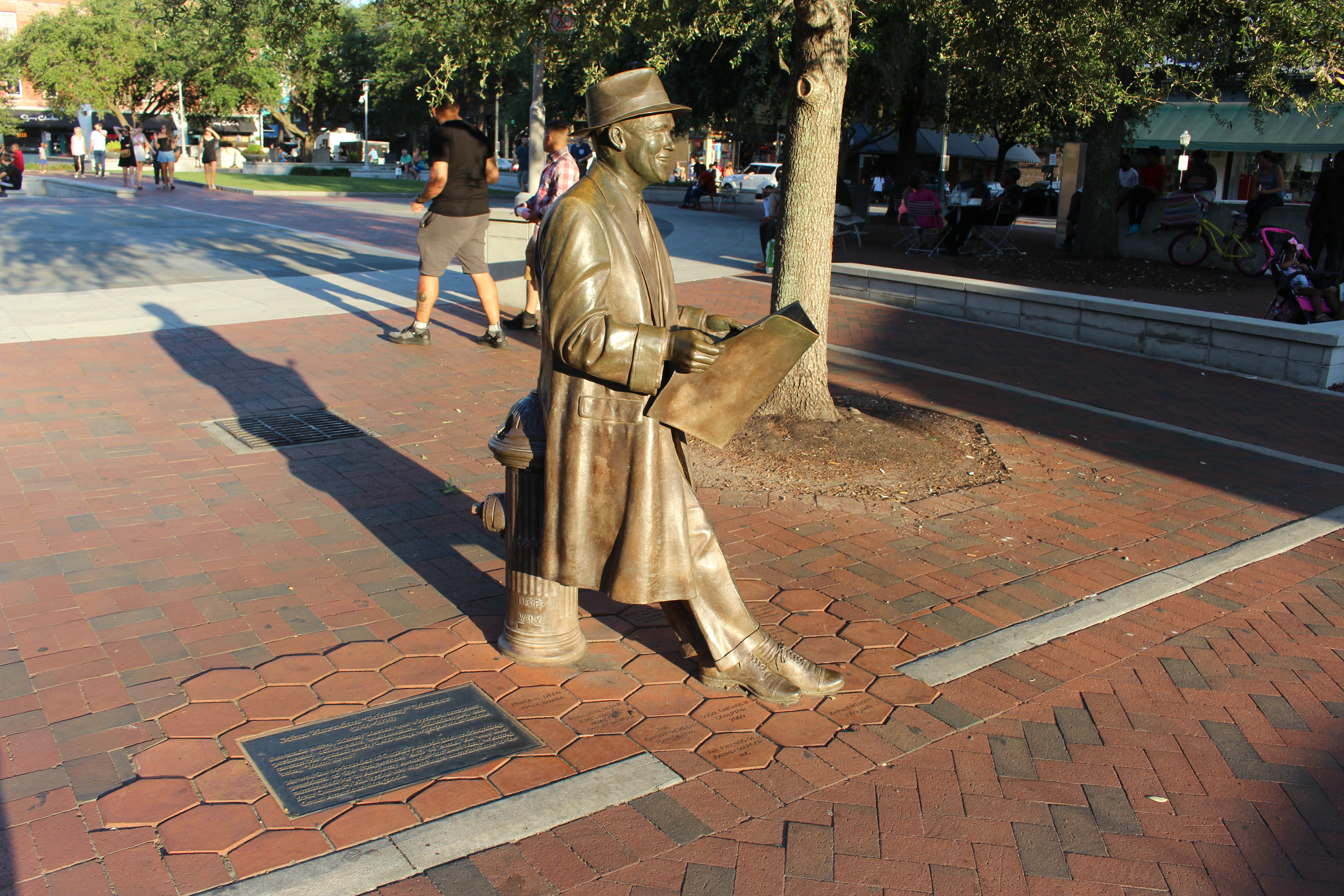
A bronze statue of Mercer stands in Savannah's Ellis Square.

For the occasion of Mercer's 100th birthday in 2009, Eastwood produced a documentary film about Mercer's life and work called The Dream's on Me (Turner Classic Movies). The film was nominated for a Primetime Emmy in the category of Outstanding Nonfiction Special.

The Complete Lyrics of Johnny Mercer was published by Knopf in October 2009. The Complete Lyrics contains the texts to nearly 1,500 of his lyrics, several hundred of them appearing in print for the first time.

In November 2009, a bronze statue of Mercer was unveiled in Ellis Square in Savannah, Georgia, his hometown and birthplace. It was commissioned by the Friends of Johnny Mercer.

The Johnny Mercer Collections, including his papers and memorabilia, are preserved in the library of Georgia State University in Atlanta. GSU occasionally holds events showcasing Mercer's works.

On March 25, 2015, it was announced that Mercer's version of the popular song "Ac-Cent-Tchu-Ate the Positive" would be inducted into the Library of Congress's National Recording Registry for the song's "cultural, artistic and/or historical significance to American society and the nation's audio legacy". The music was written by Harold Arlen and the lyrics by Mercer. The song was nominated for the "Academy Award for Best Original Song" at the 18th Academy Awards in 1945 after being used in the film "Here Come the Waves". In describing his inspiration for the lyrics, Mercer told the "Pop Chronicles" radio documentary "[my] publicity agent ... went to hear Father Divine and he had a sermon and his subject was 'you got to accentuate the positive and eliminate the negative.' And I said, 'Wow, that's a colorful phrase!'"

== Songs ==
Date	Song title	Music by	Notes
1933	"Lazy Bones"	Hoagy Carmichael	
1933	"Riffin' the Scotch"	Benny Goodman, Dick McDonough, Buck Washington	
1934	"P.S. I Love You"	Gordon Jenkins	
1936	"Goody Goody"	Matty Malneck	
1936	"I'm an Old Cowhand from the Rio Grande"	Johnny Mercer	
1937	"Hooray for Hollywood"	Richard A. Whiting	
1937	"Too Marvelous for Words"	Richard A. Whiting	
1938	"Jeepers, Creepers!"	Harry Warren	Film - Going Places Nominated Best Original Song
1938	"You Must Have Been a Beautiful Baby"	Harry Warren	
1938	"When a Woman Loves a Man"	Bernie Hanighen, Gordon Jenkins	
1939	"And the Angels Sing"	Ziggy Elman	
1939	"Cuckoo in the Clock"	Walter Donaldson	
1939	"Day In, Day Out"	Rube Bloom	
1939	"I Thought About You"	Jimmy Van Heusen	
1939	"Wings Over the Navy"	Harry Warren	
1940	"Love of My Life"	Artie Shaw	Film - Second Chorus Nominated Best Original Song
1940	"I'd Know You Anywhere"	Jimmy McHugh	Film - You'll Find Out Nominated Best Original Song
1940	"Fools Rush In"	Rube Bloom	
1941	"Blues in the Night"	Harold Arlen	Blues in the Night Nominated Best Original Song
1941	"I Remember You"	Victor Schertzinger	
1941	"Tangerine"	Victor Schertzinger	
1941	"This Time the Dream's on Me"	Harold Arlen	
1942	"Moon Dreams"	Chummy MacGregor (co-writer)	
1942	"Dearly Beloved"	Jerome Kern	You Were Never Lovelier Nominated Best Original Song
1942	"Hit the Road to Dreamland"	Harold Arlen	
1942	"I'm Old Fashioned"	Jerome Kern	
1942	"Skylark"	Hoagy Carmichael	
1942	"That Old Black Magic"	Harold Arlen	Star Spangled Rhythm Nominated Best Original Song
1942	"Trav'lin' Light"	Jimmy Mundy, Trummy Young	
1943	"Dream"	Johnny Mercer	
1943	"My Shining Hour"	Harold Arlen	The Sky's the Limit Nominated Best Original Song
1943	"One for My Baby (and One More for the Road)"	Harold Arlen	
1944	"Ac-Cent-Tchu-Ate the Positive"	Harold Arlen	Here Come the Waves Nominated Best Original Song
1944	"G.I. Jive"	Johnny Mercer	
1944	"How Little We Know"	Hoagy Carmichael	For the film To Have and Have Not
1945	"Laura"	David Raksin	
1945	"Out of This World"	Harold Arlen	
1946	"Any Place I Hang My Hat Is Home"	Harold Arlen	
1946	"I Had Myself a True Love"	Harold Arlen	
1946	"Come Rain or Come Shine"	Harold Arlen	
1946	"On the Atchison, Topeka and the Santa Fe"	Harry Warren	For the film The Harvey Girls WON Oscar
1946	"Two Hearts Are Better Than One"	Jerome Kern	For the film Centennial Summer
1948	"Hills of California"	Johnny Mercer	
1949	"Early Autumn"	Ralph Burns, Woody Herman	
1949	"Truly"	Antone Iavello	
1950	"Autumn Leaves"	Joseph Kosma	Mercer relyricized the 1945 song "Les Feuilles mortes" by Kosma and French lyricist Jacques Prévert
1951	"In the Cool, Cool, Cool of the Evening"	Hoagy Carmichael	For the film Here Comes the Groom WON Oscar
1952	"I Wanna Be a Dancing Man"	Harry Warren	
1952	"The Glow-Worm"	Paul Lincke	
1953	"Satin Doll"	Duke Ellington, Billy Strayhorn	
1954	"Midnight Sun"	Lionel Hampton, Sonny Burke	
1955	"Something's Gotta Give"	Johnny Mercer	Daddy Long Legs Nominated Best Original Song
1956	"I'm Past My Prime"	Gene de Paul	
1956	"Jubilation T. Cornpone"	Gene de Paul	
1956	"Bernardine"	Johnny Mercer	For the film Bernardine
1956	"Technique"	Johnny Mercer	For the film Bernardine
1959	"I Wanna Be Around"	Johnny Mercer, Sadie Vimmerstedt	
1960	"The Facts of Life"	Johnny Mercer	The Facts of Life Nominated Best Original Song
1961	"Moon River"	Henry Mancini	For the film Breakfast at Tiffany's WON Oscar
1962	"Days of Wine and Roses"	Henry Mancini	For the film Days of Wine and Roses WON Oscar
1962	"Drinking Again"	Doris Tauber	
1963	"Charade"	Henry Mancini	For the film Charade Nominated Best Original Song
1963	"Meglio Stasera" ("It Had Better Be Tonight")	Henry Mancini	For the film The Pink Panther
1964	"Emily"	Johnny Mandel	
1964	"Lorna"	Mort Lindsey	
1965	"The Sweetheart Tree"	Henry Mancini	The Great Race Nominated Best Original Song
1964	"Talk to Me, Baby"	Bobby Dolan	For the Broadway musical comedy Foxy
1965	"Summer Wind"	Henry Mayer	
1970	"Whistling Away the Dark"	Henry Mancini	For the film Darling Lili Nominated Best Original Song & Best Original Song Score
1971	"Life Is What You Make It"	Marvin Hamlisch	For the film Kotch Nominated Best Original Song
1973	"The Phony King of England"	Johnny Mercer	For the Disney film Robin Hood
1973	"The Long Goodbye"	John Williams	For the film The Long Goodbye (film)

== Discography ==
- Johnny Mercer Sings (Capitol, 1950)
- Two of a Kind with Bobby Darin (Atco, 1961)
- Johnny Mercer with Paul Weston's Orchestra 1944 (Hindsight, 1980)
- Sweet Georgia Brown with Paul Weston (Hindsight, 1995)
- Johnny Mercer Sings Personality (ASV-Living Era, 2002)
- Johnny Mercer: Mosaic Select #28 (Mosaic, 2007)
- Mercer Sings Mercer (Capitol, 2009)

== Further reading and listening ==
- Bach, Bob; Mercer, Ginger (1982). Our Huckleberry Friend: The Life, Times, and Lyrics of Johnny Mercer. Lyle Stuart.
- Eskew, Glenn T. (2013). Johnny Mercer: Southern Songwriter for the World. University of Georgia Press.
- Eskew, Glenn T. (2013). "A Southern Spin on Consensus America: Johnny Mercer Skewers Politics on Broadway". Georgia Historical Quarterly. 97 (3): 322–346.
- Furia, Philip (1990). Poets of Tin Pan Alley. Oxford University Press.
- Furia, Philip (2003). Skylark: The Life and Times of Johnny Mercer. St. Martin's Press.
- Gilliland, John (1994). Pop Chronicles the 40s: The Lively Story of Pop Music in the 40s (audiobook). ISBN 978-1-55935-147-8. OCLC 31611854. Mercer interviewed 1971.
- Kimball, Robert; et al. (2009). The Complete Lyrics of Johnny Mercer. Knopf.
- Lees, Gene (2004). Portrait of Johnny: The Life of John Herndon Mercer. Hal Leonard.
- Wilder, Alec (1990). American Popular Song. Oxford University Press.
