= You Must Have Been a Beautiful Baby =

1938 song by Harry Warren and Johnny Mercer

- Featured in the 1938 film Hard to Get

Song by Dick Powell
- Published: 1938
- Composer: Harry Warren
- Lyricist: Johnny Mercer

"You Must Have Been a Beautiful Baby" is a popular song with music by Harry Warren and lyrics by Johnny Mercer, written in 1938 for the Warner Brothers movie Hard to Get, released November 1938, in which it was sung by Dick Powell.

The biggest-selling hit version was recorded by Bing Crosby, with Bob Crosby and his orchestra while other contemporaneous hit versions included recordings by Tommy Dorsey (with vocal by Edythe Wright) and Russ Morgan. It was also revived by Bobby Darin in 1961, reaching the charts again that year. The song has been recorded by many other artists (see below for a partial list) and is considered a popular standard. It was used frequently in the Looney Tunes and Merrie Melodies cartoons, also produced by Warner Brothers, under the musical direction of Carl W. Stalling. It was also used in the MGM Cartoon Baby Puss, starring Tom and Jerry, released on Christmas Day in 1943.

== Recorded versions ==
- Russ Morgan and his orchestra (recorded August 26, 1938, released by Decca Records as catalog number 2125A, with the flip side "This Is Madness")
- Tommy Dorsey and his Clambake 7 with vocal by Edythe Wright (recorded September 29, 1938, released by Victor Records as catalog number 26066, with the flip side "Sailing at Midnight")
- Blue Barron and his orchestra (recorded October 1, 1938, released by Bluebird Records as catalog number 7886 and by Montgomery Ward Records as catalog number 7537, both with the flip side "It's Time to Say Aloha")
- Bing Crosby with Bob Crosby and his orchestra (recorded October 14, 1938, released by Decca Records as catalog number 2147A, with the flip side "Summertime")
- Chick Bullock (recorded October 20, 1938, released by Conqueror Records as catalog number 9149, with the flip side "I Won't Tell a Soul")
- Dorothy Carless and Sam Costa ("two voices and a piano") in February 1939, released by Regal Zonophone (MR 2984).
- Robert Clary (released by Capitol Records as catalog number 891, with the flip side "Alouette")(1950)
- Perry Como (recorded March 21, 1946, released by RCA Victor Records as catalog number 20-1916, with the flip side "A Garden in the Rain")
- Bobby Darin (recorded on June 19, 1961, released as Atco 6206, with the flip side "Sorrow Tomorrow"; the biggest hit version, reaching U.S. #5, UK #10, and #2 in Canada)
- Joe Loss & his Band with vocal by Chick Henderson (recorded January 21, 1939 released on Regal Zonophone MR-2992)
- The Dave Clark Five (released in 1967 as a U.S. single on Epic Records, catalog number 10179, with the flip side "Man in the Pin-Stripe Suit"). Their version peaked at number thirty-five and was their seventeenth and final Top 40 hit In Canada the song reached number thirty-seven.
- Johnny Mercer (recorded January 1974, released on the album My Huckleberry Friend.)
- Red Norvo and his orchestra (vocal: Mildred Bailey; released by Brunswick Records as catalog number 8240, with the flip side "Just You, Just Me")
- Bob Smith and the Herman Chittison Trio (released by RCA Victor Records as catalog number 20-2266, with the flip side "Where's Sam?")
- Sung on Sharon, Lois & Bram's Elephant Show by Sharon, Lois & Bram (Season 4 - Snow White Elephant - 1987) with Jayne Eastwood
- A cover by Dr. John appears during the end credits of The Little Rascals (1994).
