= My Huckleberry Friend =

"...My Huckleberry Friend": Johnny Mercer Sings the Songs of Johnny Mercer

Studio album by Johnny Mercer
- Released: 1974
- Recorded: January–February 1974 Pye Studios, London
- Genre: Classic pop
- Length: 80:09
- Label: Pye Records
- Producer: Ken Barnes

"...My Huckleberry Friend": Johnny Mercer Sings the Songs of Johnny Mercer is an album by songwriter Johnny Mercer, released in 1974. It was his first solo album, which he made at age 64.

Recorded just two years before his death, ...My Huckleberry Friend features, by and large, updated arrangements of most of Mercer's most popular tunes as interpreted by the author himself. The instrumentation relies heavily (but not exclusively) on a flute-lead horn section, electric piano and Latin tinged percussion. Some of the songs, however, such as "One For My Baby", "Any Place I Hang My Hat Is Home" and "Midnight Sun" feature more classic arrangements in the ballad style.

The album's title comes from the song responsible for relaunching Mercer's career, "Moon River". The recording of "Satin Doll", the classic hit he wrote with Duke Ellington, includes Mercer's rewrite of the last eight bars.

== Track listing ==
1. "You Must Have Been a Beautiful Baby" (Harry Warren) – 2:54
2. "Little Ol' Tune" (Johnny Mercer) – 3:05
3. "Moon River" (Henry Mancini) – 3:43
4. "I Wanna Be In Love Again" (Johnny Mercer) – 2:34
5. "Days of Wine and Roses" (Henry Mancini) – 3:16
6. "Talk to Me Baby" (Robert E. Dolan) – 3:19
7. "Goody Goody" (Matt Melnick) – 2:31
8. "Summer Wind" (Heinz Meier, Hans Bradtke) – 3:39
9. "Little Ingenue" (Johnny Mercer) – 3:19
10. "Something's Gotta Give" (Johnny Mercer) – 2:34
11. "Satin Doll" (Duke Ellington, Billy Strayhorn) – 2:53
12. "It's Great to Be Alive" (Robert E. Dolan) – 2:32
13. "That Old Black Magic" (Harold Arlen) – 2:47
14. "Tangerine" (Victor Schertzinger) – 2:56
15. "The What-Cha-Ma-Call-It" (Gene DePaul) – 2:44
16. "Midnight Sun" (Francis J. Burke) – 4:15
17. "I'm Old Fashioned" (Jerome Kern) – 3:18
18. "Come Rain or Come Shine" (Harold Arlen) – 3:22
19. "Too Marvelous For Words" (Richard Whiting) – 2:39
20. "Autumn Leaves" (Joseph Kosma, Andre Jacques Prevert) – 3:52
21. "Any Place I Hang My Hat Is Home" (Harold Arlen) – 3:41
22. "The Air-Minded Executive" (Bernard Hanighen) – 2:49
23. "Pineapple Pete" (Harold David Aloma, Al Jacobs) – 2:44
24. "I Thought About You" (Jimmy Van Heusen) – 2:54
25. "One for My Baby (and One More for the Road)" (Harold Arlen) – 3:58

All songs co-written by Johnny Mercer unless otherwise noted.

== Personnel ==
- Johnny Mercer - vocals, composer
- Pete Moore - arranger, conductor
