= June Hutton =

American singer (1919–1973)

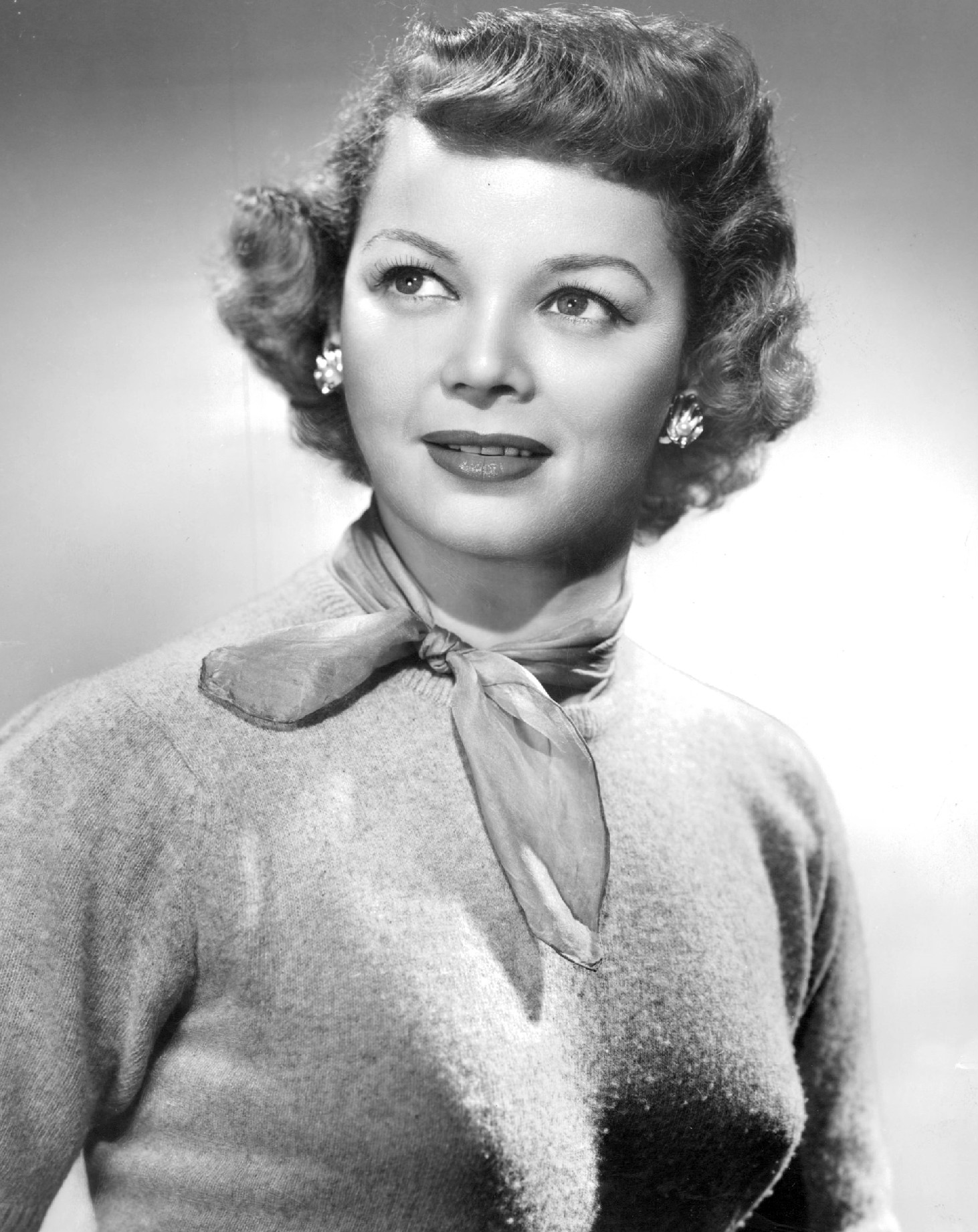
- Hutton in 1951
- Born: June Marvel Cowan; August 11, 1919; Bloomington, Illinois, U.S.
- Died: May 2, 1973 (aged 53); Los Angeles, California, U.S.
- Occupation: Singer
- Spouses: Axel Stordahl (m. 1951; died 1963) Kenneth Tobey (m. 1968)
- Children: 2

June Hutton (born June Marvel Cowan; August 11, 1919 – May 2, 1973) was an American vocalist, popular with big bands during the 1940s. She was the younger sister of Ina Ray Hutton.

== Early years ==
Hutton was born in Bloomington, Illinois. Her parents were Marvel Svea Williams and Odie Daniel Cowan. She and her older sister, Ina Ray Hutton, both grew up to be entertainers and performers during the Big Band era.

When she was 15, she left home to join her sister in pursuit of a singing career.

== Career ==
In her early days, she sang at the Astor Roof in New York City. After singing with her sister's orchestra in 1938, she was part of the Winston Trio, the Quintones, and the Sande Williams Band. She appeared with the Quintones in Hi Ya, Gentlemen, a failed musical with boxer Max Baer. In 1941, she became the female vocalist for the Stardusters, the singing group of Charlie Spivak & His Orchestra.

After Jo Stafford left The Pied Pipers in 1944, Hutton replaced her, joining the group in May. She performed with the Pied Pipers for six years, recording several hit records including the song "Dream." In 1950, Hutton left the Pied Pipers, going solo on Decca Records. (However, the trade publication Billboard reported in its December 10, 1949, issue that Hutton had already left the Pied Pipers and signed with Decca Records.)

Hutton's post-Pipers solo career included her debut in New York at the Copacabana nightclub November 16, 1950.

In 1951, Hutton married Axel Stordahl, a musical arranger for Tommy Dorsey. In 1952, she went to Capitol Records, backed by an orchestra led by her husband. She recorded three hit records at Capitol: "Say You're Mine Again", "No Stone Unturned", and "For the First Time". They also recorded a well-regarded 1955 album, Afterglow, featuring lush arrangements and the vocal group Boys Next Door.

== Later years ==
Stordahl died in 1963, and Hutton married actor Kenneth Tobey in 1968. Hutton died in Encino, Los Angeles, on May 2, 1973, at the age of 53. She is buried beside Stordahl at Forest Lawn Memorial Park in Glendale, California.

== Partial discography ==
- If You've Got the Money I've Got the Time/Tear Drops From My Eyes (1950, Decca #27329 with the Lee Gordon Singers.)
- My Sweetie Went Away/More Than I Should (1950, Decca 27061)
- All the Bees Are Buzzin' Round My Honey/For You, My Love (1950, Decca 24056)
- Nothing/Bye, Honey, Bye-Bye (1951 Decca 27833)
- Keep It a Secret/I Miss You So (1952, Capitol 2268)
- For the First Time/If It's the Last Thing I Do (1953, Capitol 2667)
- By the Light of the Silvery Moon (1953 Capitol with Gordon MacRae)
- Full Dimensional Sound -- A Study in High Fidelity (1953 Capitol) Hutton was one of several artists included on a long-playing album to "demonstrate to audiophiles the full range and capabilities of sound reproducing systems."
- The Lights of Home/You Are My Love (1953 Capitol 2369)
- I Had a Little Too Much to Dream Last Night/Song of the Sleigh Bells (1953 Capitol 2318)
- Coney Island Boat/Open Your Arms (1954 Capitol 2784)
- Gee/Too Little Time (1954 Capitol 2727)
