= Paul Fredricks =

American brass player (1918–2010)

- Born: Paul Gerald Fredricks; July 14, 1918
- Died: July 4, 2010 (aged 91)
- Occupation: Jazz musician
- Years active: 1936–2001
- Spouse: Theresa Elnicky (1924–2004) (her death)

Paul G. Fredricks (July 14, 1918 – July 4, 2010) was an American brass musician of the Big Bands Era of the 1930s and 1940s. He is known for his unique skills as a trumpeter and left his mark on a range of larger bands such as the orchestras of Alvino Rey, Charlie Spivak, Les Brown's Band of Renown, and Mel Torme's Mel-Tones, in the jazz music scene of the period surrounding World War II . He later ventured off with his own New Orleans-style Dixieland jazz band The Paul Fredricks Orchestra, later The Crescent City Stompers. He was featured in some Hollywood films including A. Edward Sutherland and RKO Pictures' Sing Your Worries Away (1942), starring Buddy Ebsen, Patsy Kelly and Bert Lahr.

== Early life and career ==
Fredricks' grandparents were members of the German migration to the States in the 19th century. Raised near Philadelphia, Pennsylvania, he received his first trumpet as a gift from his parents at the age of nine. He developed his skills playing on his own and in several local bands as a young boy until he left home at 16 to pursue his dreams in New York City's music scene of the time.

Throughout his eight decades as a professional musician, he cultivated a versatile career and recognized musical style. Fredricks began his professional music career in New York City at the age of 16 playing gigs at the Lincoln Hotel in New York City and the Rustic Cabin in Englewood Cliffs, New Jersey, a launch pad of Frank Sinatra. He continued playing with big bands before and after the war, during which he voluntarily entered to serve in the United States Army in the Asia-Pacific Arena. In the years surrounding the war, he toured across the country and was featured in shows in Hollywood, California; The Roseland Ballroom, The Paramount Theater and The Palladium/Academy of Music in New York. In 1941, after Alvino Rey's group played at New York's Paramount Theater, which led to greater exposure, they became one of the most popular acts in the country, recording top ten hits and making appearances in Hollywood films including A. Edward Sutherland and RKO Pictures' Sing Your Worries Away (1942), and others. Rey re-organized the orchestra, expanding the brass section including Paul Fredricks.

== WWII and Beyond ==
Fredricks served in the U.S. Army and toured the Asia-Pacific Arena serving his country in a number of roles. After the war, Fredricks was scouted by Charlie Spivak and played with his orchestra between 1946 and 1948. Paul retired from work with Charlie Spivak's Orchestra to start his own New Orlean's style jazz band The Paul Fredricks Orchestra, later The Crescent City Stompers, for which he led tours for many years to come.

== Personal life ==
Fredricks met and married his wife of 57 years, Austrian beauty Theresa Elnicky. Although Spivak approached him to contribute to the brass section of his orchestra while he was still in the service, Fredricks completed his duty before Theresa joined him on tour in 1947. The couple toured together for years to come including with Spivak and his own band The Crescent City Stompers (formerly The Paul Fredricks Orchestra) Theresa herself turned down opportunities to pursue a Hollywood career in order to focus on her marriage and three children with a home base near Philadelphia, Pennsylvania. His granddaughter is a fashion model and humanitarian Kate Gibbs.
