= The Bastard King of England =

Vulgar English folk song

"The Bastard King of England" is a bawdy English folk song commonly falsely attributed to Rudyard Kipling, or less commonly Lord Tennyson, Charles Dickens, Walt Whitman, or Charles Whistler. The earliest known appearance of the song was in 1927. The song depicts various sexual escapades involving the title character, an unnamed Queen of Spain, a French king named Phillip, and the "Duke of Zippity-Zap" who gives the King a case of the clap. The song has a number of historical inaccuracies, since the last French king to bear the name Philip died in the 14th century, but Spain would not become a united kingdom until the 15th, while the last King of England to be illegitimate was William I (reigned 1066–1087), although it was alleged during the reign of Edward IV (1461–1483) that Edward was illegitimate. Also, it would be quite impossible to drag anyone from France to England behind a horse before the Channel Tunnel was dug.

According to Ed Cray, author of Bawdy Ballads, "As the story goes, Rudyard Kipling wrote 'The Bastard King of England' (pronounced En-ga-land') and that authorship cost him his poet laureate's knighthood. It is too bad that the attribution is apparently spurious; 'The Bastard King' would undoubtedly be Kipling's most popular work" if he had actually written it.

In the first episode of Z: The Beginning of Everything, Zelda Fitzgerald sings a verse from the ballad before diving off a dock. A very similar song with family-friendly lyrics by Johnny Mercer, called "The Phony King of England", appears in Disney's 1973 animated film Robin Hood, performed by Phil Harris in a sequence where characters make fun of King John.
