= Irene Daye =

American jazz musician

- Born: January 17, 1918; Lawrence, Massachusetts
- Died: November 1, 1971 (aged 53); Greenville, South Carolina
- Resting place: Woodlawn Park Cemetery, South Miami, Florida

Irene Daye (January 17, 1918, Lawrence, Massachusetts – November 1, 1971, Greenville, South Carolina) was an American jazz singer.

== Early life ==
Daye began her career at age 17 by singing in Dan Murphy's Musical Skippers big band while still in high school in 1935, continuing with Murphy through 1937. She then worked briefly with Mal Hallett before beginning work with Gene Krupa, with whose orchestra she sang from 1938 to 1941. Krupa and Daye recorded 63 titles together, with her biggest hit being "Drum Boogie", which was recorded in the last session she did with Krupa.

After leaving Krupa, Daye retired from music at the age of 23, marrying Corky Cornelius. Anita O'Day took her spot in Krupa's orchestra. Daye had a daughter in 1943, but Cornelius (then in the Casa Loma Orchestra) died suddenly later that year, after which she returned to her singing career.

== Marriage and death ==
From 1944 to 1950, she sang with Charlie Spivak, then married him in 1950 and retired from performance, working as her husband's manager until her death in 1971 at age 53 from cancer, in Greenville, South Carolina.

== Discography ==
- Gene Krupa, Gene Krupa and His Orchestra 1939–1940 (Classics, 1995)
- Charlie Spivak, Charlie Spivak and His Orchestra 1943–1946 (Hindsight, 1994)
