= Swan Records (jazz label) =

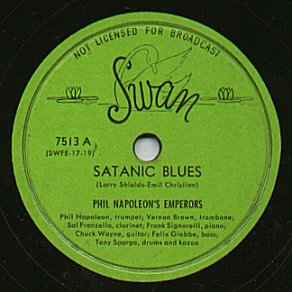
- Label of 78rpm Swan Record by Phil Napoleon's jazz band, recorded in April 1946
- Founded: 1946
- Country of origin: United States
- Location: New York

Swan Records (aka Swan Recording Co. Inc.) was an American record company and label that was founded in 1946 and closed the same year. Sometime before 1959, Swan went out of business. In 1950, Mercury acquired 16 masters once owned by Swan, all being of Phil Napoleon. In 1946, Swan listed its address at 1600 Broadway, Room 1003, New York, New York.

== History ==
The Jazz Discography by Tom Lord lists 18 recording sessions that took place from January to April 1946. Les Schriber Sr., who had founded Black & White Records in 1943 and sold it in 1945, went to work for Swan, but left sometime around October 1946. Sometime around November 1946, Swan appointed Jesse J. Trilling as Secretary-Treasurer of Swan.

== Artists ==
Emperors of Jazz

- Tony Spargo (1897–1969) (director)
- Phil Napoleon (1901–1900) (trumpet)
- Lou McGarity (1917–1971) (trombone)
- Joe Dixon (1917–1998)
- Peanuts Hucko (1918–2003) (clarinet)
- Frank Signorelli (1901–1975) (piano)
- Chuck Wayne (1923–1997) (guitar)
- Felix Giobbe (double bass)

Sal Franzella Quintet

- Sal Franzella (de) (1915–1968) Quintet
- Tony Mottola (1918–2004) (guitar)
- Buddy Weed (1918–1997) (piano)

Napoleon Emperors

- Phil Napoleon (1901–1900) (trumpet)
- Vernon Brown (1907–1979) (trombone)
- Sal Franzella (de) (1915–1968) (clarinet)
- Frank Signorelli (1901–1975) (piano)
- Chuck Wayne (1923–1997) (guitar)
- Felix Giobbe (1914–1985) (double bass)
- Tony Spargo (1897–1969) (drums)

Don Redman and His Orchestra

- Hot Lips Page (1908–1954) (trumpet)
- Dick Vance (1915–1985) (trumpet)
- Harold Johnson (1918–1978) (trumpet)
- Henry Glover (1921–1991) (trumpet)
- Henderson Chambers (1908–1967) (trombone)
- Don Redman (1900–1964) (alto saxophone)
- Burnie Peacock (alto saxophone)
- Don Byas (1912–1972) (tenor saxophone)
- Bob Wyatt (piano)
- Cozy Cole (1909–1981) (drums)

Rhythmaires

- Ben Roberson (piano)
- Aaron Smith (guitar)
- George Duvivier (1920–1985) (double bass)

== Selected extant discography ==
Don Redman and His Orchestra

- 7501, Studio recording, January 1, 1946, New York City

Side A: "Midnight Moods"
Side B: "Mickey Finn"

Released on Onyx (nl) LP 220; OCLC 3585846
Released on PickUp 1002

- 7502, Studio recording, January 1, 1946, New York City

Side A: "Carrie Mae Blues"
Side B: "Dark Glasses"

Sides A & B released on Onyx (nl) LP 220; OCLC 3585846
Sides A & B released on PickUp 1003
Sides A & B released on Foxy 9007

Rhythmaires

- 7503

Side A: "On The Level"
Side B: "Russian Lullaby"

- 7504

Side A: "Say, Old Man, Watcha Ya Doin'?"
Side B: "I Got Rhythm"

- 7505

Side A: "Sweet Lorraine"
Side B: "Just Jammin'"

Emperors of Jazz

- 7506

Side A: SWFD-12-7 (matrix) "Royal Garden Blues"; OCLC 27986148
Side B: SWFD-12-6 (matrix) "Nobody's Sweetheart"

- 7507 (1946)

Side A: SWFD-10-4 (matrix) "Muskrat Ramble"; OCLC 27977258
Side B: SWFD-10-2 (matrix) "Clarinet Marmalade"

- 7508 (1946)

Side A: SWFD-10-1 (matrix) "At The Jazz Band Ball"; OCLC 27977486
Side B: SWFD-12-5 (matrix) "Figety Feet"

- 7509 (1946)

Side A: SWFD-12-8 (matrix) "Tiger Rag"; OCLC 27986112
Side B: SWFD-10-3 (matrix) "Little Emperor Blues"

Phil Napoleon's Emperors

- 7510 (1946)

Side A: "I Wish I Could Shimmy Like My Sister Kate"
Side B: "I'll Never Be The Same"

== See also ==
- Les Schriber Sr. of Black & White Records
- List of record labels
