= Lazybones (song) =

1933 song by Hoagy Carmichael and Johnny Mercer

Lazybones or "Lazy Bones" is a Tin Pan Alley song written in 1933, with lyrics by Johnny Mercer (1909-1976), and music by Hoagy Carmichael (1899-1981).

Mercer was from Savannah, Georgia, and resented the Tin Pan Alley attitude of rejecting Southern regional vernacular in favor of artificial Southern songs written by people who had never been to the South. Alex Wilder attributes much of the popularity of this song to Mercer's perfect regional lyric. He wrote the lyrics to "Lazybones" as a protest against those artificial "Dixies", announcing the song's authenticity at the start with "Long as there is chicken gravy on your rice".

== Recordings ==
"Lazybones"

Single by Jonathan King
- B-side: "I Just Want to Say "Thank You""
- Released: 1971
- Genre: Soft rock, easy listening
- Length: 2:10
- Label: Decca Records 13177
- Songwriters: Johnny Mercer, Hoagy Carmichael
- Producer: Jonathan King

Jonathan King singles chronology
"Cherry Cherry" (1970)	"Lazybones" (1971)	"Hooked on a Feeling" (1971)

Official audio
- "Lazy Bones" on YouTube

The song has been recorded scores of times over the years: Recordings were released as early as 1933 by Jay Wilbur, Paul Robeson, and 1934 by the Mills Brothers.

== Later recordings ==
It has been recorded by a variety of artists in a variety of genres:

- Hank Snow on the album Old Doc Brown in 1955,
- The Supremes on their 1965 album The Supremes Sing Country, Western and Pop
- Leon Redbone on his 1975 album On the Track.
- Jonathan King's 1971 revival was a top 20 hit in the UK and was played on US soft rock stations, earning a position on Billboard's Easy Listening chart, reached #34. King's version sold over a million copies around the world.
- In 2018, it was recorded by Nellie McKay.

== Popular culture ==
- The song was performed by the fictional Electric Mayhem band on The Muppet Show in 1977.
- The Jerry Garcia Band performed the song in concert 11 times, from 1991-1995.
