= Moon River =

Song from the 1961 film Breakfast at Tiffany's

Single by Henry Mancini & Orchestra

from the album Breakfast at Tiffany's: Music from the Motion Picture
- B-side: "Breakfast at Tiffany's"
- Released: September 1961
- Recorded: 1960
- Studio: RCA Music Center of the World, Hollywood, California
- Genre: Traditional pop
- Length: 2:41
- Label: RCA Victor
- Composer: Henry Mancini
- Lyricist: Johnny Mercer
- Producers: Dick Peirce, Joe Reisman

Audio sample
- file; help

"Moon River" is a song composed by Henry Mancini with lyrics by Johnny Mercer. It was originally performed by Audrey Hepburn in the 1961 film Breakfast at Tiffany's, winning an Academy Award for Best Original Song. The song also won the 1962 Grammy Awards for Record of the Year and Song of the Year. In 1999, Mancini's recording was inducted into the Grammy Hall of Fame.

The song has been recorded by many other artists. It became the theme song for Andy Williams, who first recorded it in 1962 (and performed it at the Academy Awards ceremony that year). He sang the first eight bars of the song at the beginning of each episode of his eponymous television show and named his production company and venue in Branson, Missouri, after it; his autobiography is called "Moon River" and Me. Williams' version was included in a LP that he recorded for Columbia on a hit album of 1962, Moon River and Other Great Movie Themes. In 2022, Williams' rendition of the song was selected for preservation in the Library of Congress. CBS News included the song in its 2026 list of the 250 essential American songs of the past 250 years.

The song's success was responsible for relaunching Mercer's career as a songwriter, which had stalled in the mid-1950s because rock and roll had replaced jazz standards as the popular music of the time. The song's popularity is such that it has been used as a test sample in a study on people's memories of popular songs. Comments about the lyrics have noted that they are particularly reminiscent of Mercer's youth in the Southern United States and his longing to expand his horizons. Robert Wright wrote in The Atlantic Monthly, "This is a love sung [sic] to wanderlust. Or a romantic song in which the romantic partner is the idea of romance." An inlet near Savannah, Georgia, Johnny Mercer's hometown, was named Moon River in honor of him and this song.

== Versions ==
=== Original ===
Mercer and Mancini wrote the song for Audrey Hepburn to sing in the film Breakfast at Tiffany's. The lyrics, written by Mercer, are reminiscent of his childhood in Savannah, Georgia, including its waterways. As a child, he had picked huckleberries in summer, and he connected them with a carefree childhood and Mark Twain's Huckleberry Finn. Mercer's original title for the song was "Blue River", reflecting the color of huckleberries. Although an instrumental version is played over the film's opening titles, the lyrics are first heard in a scene where Paul "Fred" Varjak (George Peppard) discovers Holly Golightly (Hepburn) singing the song, accompanying herself on the guitar while sitting on the fire escape outside their apartments.

There was an eruption of behind-the-scenes consternation when a Paramount Pictures executive, Martin Rackin, suggested removing the song from the film after a tepid Los Angeles preview. Hepburn's reaction was described by Mancini and others in degrees varying from her saying, "Over my dead body!" to her using more colorful language to make the same point.

An album version was recorded by Mancini and his orchestra and chorus (without Hepburn's vocal) on December 8, 1960. It was released as a single in 1961 and became a number 11 hit in December of that year. Due to unpublished charts in Billboard, Joel Whitburn's Top Adult (Contemporary) Songs variously reported the song as a number 3 or number 1 easy listening hit. Mancini's original version was also featured in the film Born on the Fourth of July (1989). In 1993, following Hepburn's death, her version was released on an album titled Music from the Films of Audrey Hepburn. In 2004, Hepburn's version finished at number 4 on AFI's 100 Years...100 Songs survey of top tunes in American cinema.

=== Early recordings ===
"Moon River"

Single by Jerry Butler

from the album Moon River
- A-side: "Aware of Love"
- Released: 1961
- Recorded: 1961
- Studio: Universal (Chicago)
- Genre: Pop, R&B
- Length: 2:45
- Label: Vee-Jay
- Composer: Henry Mancini
- Lyricist: Johnny Mercer
- Producer: Riley C. Hampton

Jerry Butler singles chronology
"I'm a Telling You" (1961)	"Moon River" (1961)	"Aware of Love" (1961)

"Moon River" was a hit single for Jerry Butler in late 1961. Released simultaneously with Mancini's, it reached number 11 on the Billboard Hot 100 chart and number 3 Easy Listening in December, two weeks before Mancini's recording reached the same chart ranking. In Canada the song reached number 14, co-charting with the Mancini version. British singer Danny Williams had a hit version of the song that reached number one in the UK in the final week of 1961.

Although Andy Williams never released the song as a single, his LP Moon River and Other Great Movie Themes (1962), was certified gold in 1963 for selling one million units. The album reached number 3 on the Billboard Top 200, eventually selling more than two million copies by 1967. In 2002, a 74-year-old Andy Williams sang the song at the conclusion of the live NBC special telecast celebrating the network's 75th anniversary. In 2018, Andy Williams' version on Columbia Records was inducted into the Grammy Hall of Fame. In 2022, Andy Williams' recording of the song was selected by the Library of Congress for preservation in the National Recording Registry.

=== Chart history ===
Henry Mancini & Orchestra

Chart (1961–62)	Peak position
Canada (CHUM Hit Parade)	14
UK Singles Chart	46
U.S. Billboard Hot 100	11
U.S. Billboard Easy Listening	3
U.S. Cash Box Top 100	5

Jerry Butler

Chart (1961–62)	Peak position
Canada (CHUM Hit Parade)	14
New Zealand (Listener)	1
U.S. Billboard Hot 100	11
U.S. Billboard Easy Listening	3
U.S. Cash Box Top 100	5

Danny Williams

Chart (1961–62)	Peak position
UK Singles Chart	1

== Later versions ==
Hundreds of versions of the song have been recorded and it has been featured in many media. Mercer recorded the song in 1974 for his album My Huckleberry Friend. In 2007, saxophonist Dave Koz recorded a version from his standards music album, At the Movies, sung by Barry Manilow. In 2013, Neil Finn and Paul Kelly performed the song on their Goin' Your Way Tour, during which their performance at the Sydney Opera House Concert Hall was recorded for the live album, Goin' Your Way, released the same year. The title of the album comes from a phrase in the song's chorus: "Wherever you're goin', I'm goin' your way". Lawrence Welk's 1961 instrumental version was featured in Mad Men season 6, episode 13, "In Care Of" (2013). A version of the song was featured in Asif Kapadia's documentary film, Amy (2015), about Amy Winehouse. Winehouse's version, sung at age 16 with the National Youth Jazz Orchestra in 2000, is the opening song in the film.

The Telegraph listed, among prominent covers of the song, those by Frank Sinatra, Judy Garland, Sarah Vaughan, Louis Armstrong, Sarah Brightman and Chevy Chase (in the comedy film Fletch). Other stars who have covered the song include Rod Stewart in Fly Me to the Moon... The Great American Songbook Volume V (2010), which charted at No. 4 on the Billboard 200, Barbra Streisand in The Movie Album (2003), a Grammy-nominated gold album, and Frank Ocean, who released a cover on Valentine's Day 2018 that debuted in the Top 10 of the Billboard Hot R&B chart. Diffuser.fm named these the "Top 5 Alt-Rock" versions of the song: Morrissey, Glasvegas, R.E.M., The Killers and Josh Ritter. Jacob Collier's a capella cover won the 2020 Grammy Award for Best Arrangement, Instrumental or A Cappella.

=== Certifications ===
Certifications for "Moon River" (Frank Ocean's version)
Region	Certification	Certified units/sales
New Zealand (RMNZ)	Platinum	30,000^{‡}
^{‡} Sales+streaming figures based on certification alone.

== See also ==
- "Charade" (1963 song)
- The Sweetheart Tree
- "Days of Wine and Roses" (song)
- Moon River radio program
- List of UK Singles Chart number ones of the 1960s
