= Johnny Mercer's Music Shop =

1943 radio program with Johnny Mercer

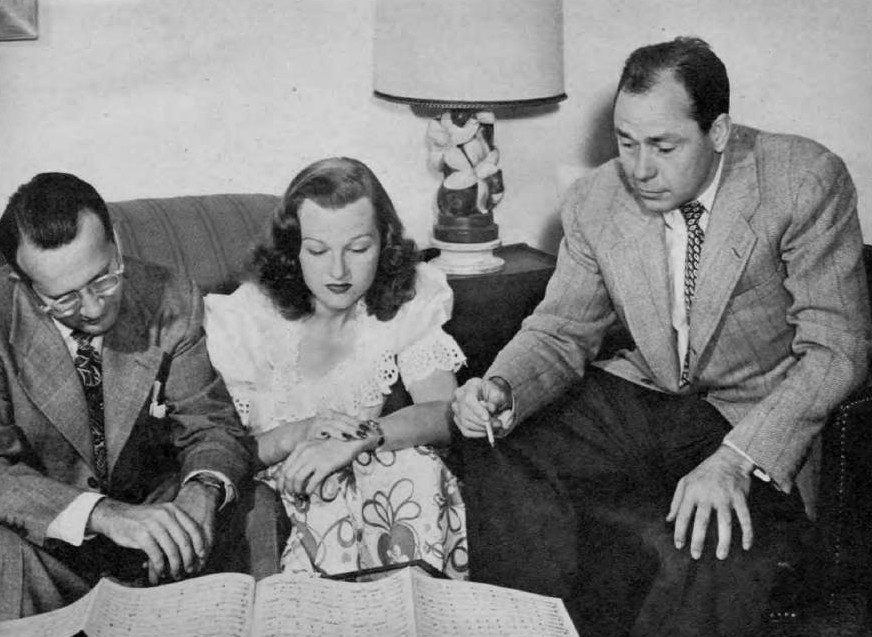
- Paul Weston, Jo Stafford and Johnny Mercer were featured in Johnny Mercer's Music Shop.
- Genre: Popular music
- Running time: 30 minutes
- Country of origin: United States
- Language: English
- Home station: WEAF
- Syndicates: NBC
- Starring: Johnny Mercer
- Original release: June 22 – September 14, 1943
- Sponsored by: Pepsodent

Johnny Mercer's Music Shop is an old-time radio program that featured popular songs. It was broadcast on NBC from June 22, 1943, until September 14, 1943, as a summer replacement for The Pepsodent Show. A similar program with a slightly different title was broadcast in 1944.

Mercer was a guest on The Pepsodent Show's season finale, providing a transition to the premiere of his own program the following week. The show originated from WEAF and was sponsored by Pepsodent toothpaste.

Singers Ella Mae Morse and Jo Stafford were regulars on the program, with musical support from The Pied Pipers and Paul Weston and his orchestra. Although the program's cast was white, episodes sometimes presented a black image. For example, the first episode included both the song "Louisville Lou (That Vampin' Lady)", which is about a black stripper, and a minstrel show skit.

A review in the trade publication Billboard praised the program's musical performances but noted that its comedy components needed to be improved to better match Mercer's personality, which the Encyclopedia of Music in the 20th Century commented was "so suited to the medium."

== Critical response ==
A review in the trade publication Billboard indicated that the program's main flaw was in Mercer's attempts at comedy; otherwise, he "aptly and unaffectedly handled the triple role of star, emsee [sic] and vocalist." It complimented the performances of Morse, Stafford, and The Pied Pipers.

== The Chesterfield Music Shop (1944) ==
As the title implies, Chesterfield cigarettes sponsored this 15-minute program, which ran from June 12, 1944, until December 8, 1944 on NBC. Members of the cast were the same as those in the 1943 program, except for the addition of Wendell Niles as announcer. In addition to the NBC broadcasts, the show was also carried by the Armed Forces Radio Service for transmission to United States military personnel.
