= Charlie Spivak =

Ukrainian-American trumpeter and bandleader (1904–1982)

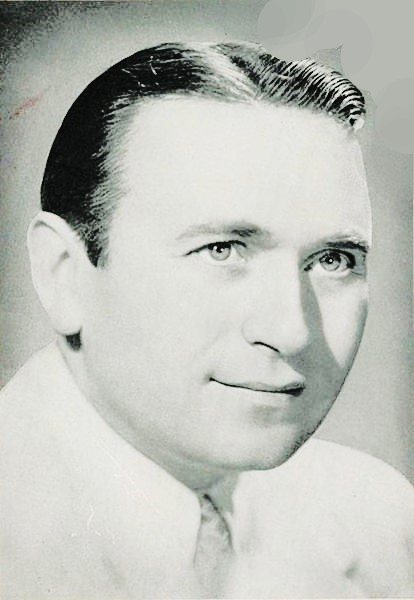
- Charlie Spivak (1944)

Background information
- Born: Сендер Співаковський (Sender Spivakovsky) c. February 17, 1904; Trilisy, Kiev Governorate, Russian Empire (now Ukraine)
- Died: March 1, 1982 (aged 78)
- Genres: Jazz, big band
- Occupations: Bandleader, musician
- Instrument: Trumpet

Charlie Spivak (c. February 17, 1904 – March 1, 1982) was an American trumpeter and bandleader, best known for his big band in the 1940s.

== Early life ==
According to his immigration record, Sender Spivakovsky was born around 1904 in the village of Trilisy, Kiev Governorate, Russian Empire (now Ukraine). He arrived with his family at Ellis Island on 31 August 1910 (age 6), bound for New Haven, Connecticut to meet his older brother. By the time of the 10 January 1920 census (age 15), his family anglicized his name into "Charlie Spivak". As a Ukrainian-Jew, recorded details of Spivak's birth are unclear. Later sources place it in 1907. His personal papers claim the latter scenario. He learned to play trumpet and played in his high school band, going on to work with local groups before joining Johnny Cavallaro's orchestra.

== Big band era and style ==
He played with Paul Specht's band for most of 1924 to 1930, then spent time with Ben Pollack (1931–1934), the brothers Tommy and Jimmy Dorsey (1934–1935), and Ray Noble (1935–1936). He played on "Solo Hop" in 1935 by Glenn Miller and the Glenn Miller Orchestra. He spent 1936 and 1937 mostly working as a studio musician with Gus Arnheim, Glenn Miller, Raymond Scott's radio orchestra, and others, followed by periods with Bob Crosby (1938), Tommy Dorsey (1938–1939), and Jack Teagarden (1939).

Finally, with the encouragement and financial backing of Glenn Miller, he formed his own band in November 1939. Though it failed within a year, he tried again shortly afterwards, this time taking over the existing band of Bill Downer and making a success of it. Spivak's band was one of the most successful in the 1940s, and survived until 1959. He scouted top trumpeter Paul Fredricks (formerly of Alvino Rey's Orchestra) just as Fredricks left the service at the end of World War II, in 1946. Fredricks was instrumental in the band's success in the coming years as it reached its peak.

His theme song was "Stardreams", which he co-wrote with Sonny Burke and Sylvia Dee, released as a Okeh Records 78 in 1942.

Popular recordings during the 1940s included:

- "This Is No Laughing Matter" (vocal by Garry Stevens) (1941)
- "I Left My Heart at the Stage Door Canteen" (vocal by Garry Stevens)( 1942)
- "My Devotion" (vocal by Garry Stevens) (1942)
- "You Belong to My Heart" (vocal by Jimmy Saunders) (1945)
- "It's Been a Long, Long Time" (vocal by Irene Daye) (1945)
- "Oh! What It Seemed to Be" (vocal by Jimmy Saunders) (1946)
- "I Love You (For Sentimental Reasons) (vocal by Jimmy Saunders) (1946)
- "Linda" (vocal by Tommy Mercer) (1947)

Spivak's experience playing with jazz musicians had little effect on his own band's style, which was straight dance music, made up mainly of ballads and popular tunes. Spivak himself (known as "Cheery, Chubby Charlie") had been noted for his trumpet's sweet tone and his strength for playing lead parts, rather than for any improvisational ability. He was also known as "The Man Who Plays The Sweetest Trumpet In The World".

A number of the band's musicians were to make names for themselves, including drummer Dave Tough, bassist Jimmy Middleton, trumpeters Les Elgart and Paul Fredricks, saxophonist Don Raffell, trombonist Nelson Riddle, trombonist Jimmy Knepper, and singers June Hutton and Irene Daye. (Daye and Spivak married in 1950.). Riddle was also responsible for many of the band's arrangements, together with Sonny Burke. The late Manny Albam also arranged for the Spivak band.

== Later career ==
When the Spivak orchestra broke up, he went to live in Florida, where he continued to lead a band until illness led to his temporary retirement in 1963. On his recovery, he continued to lead large and small bands, first in Las Vegas, then in South Carolina. In Greenville, South Carolina in 1967, he led a small group featuring his wife as vocalist. She died in 1971 after a long illness with cancer.

During this time, Spivak was also resident band leader for a restaurant-nightclub, "Ye Olde Fireplace", in Greenville, South Carolina. He played trumpet in the dance band that included a drummer, saxophonist, bass player and pianist. The band played standards from the big band era, but also took requests from the audience.

Spivak continued to play and record until his death in Greenville in 1982, shortly after his 75th birthday.

== Family ==
Spivak first married Freda Braverman in 1932. The marriage ended in divorce in 1947. He subsequently married his vocalist, Irene Daye, in 1950. He married Wilma (Dubby) Hayes in 1974 - the third marriage for both of them. Wilma died in 2023. Spivak's eldest son, Joel A. Spivak, was a television and radio broadcaster primarily in the Philadelphia, Los Angeles, and Washington, D.C. areas. Spivak's younger son, Steven Glenn Spivak, is a public relations manager in northern California. Spivak's stepson, Kevin Ingram, lives in Greenville, South Carolina. He is the owner of The Charlie Spivak Orchestra.

== Discography ==
- 1958: Pinciana (Design)
- 1977: Charlie Spivak and His Orchestra 1943–46 (Hindsight)
- 1985: Charlie Spivak and His Orchestra (Ranwood)
- 1993: For Sentimental Reasons (Vintage Jazz Classics)
- 2002: Dance Date (Collectors' Choice)
- 2005: What's Cookin' Charlie '41–'47
