= Honky-tonk =

Type of bar that provides musical entertainment and a style of music played there

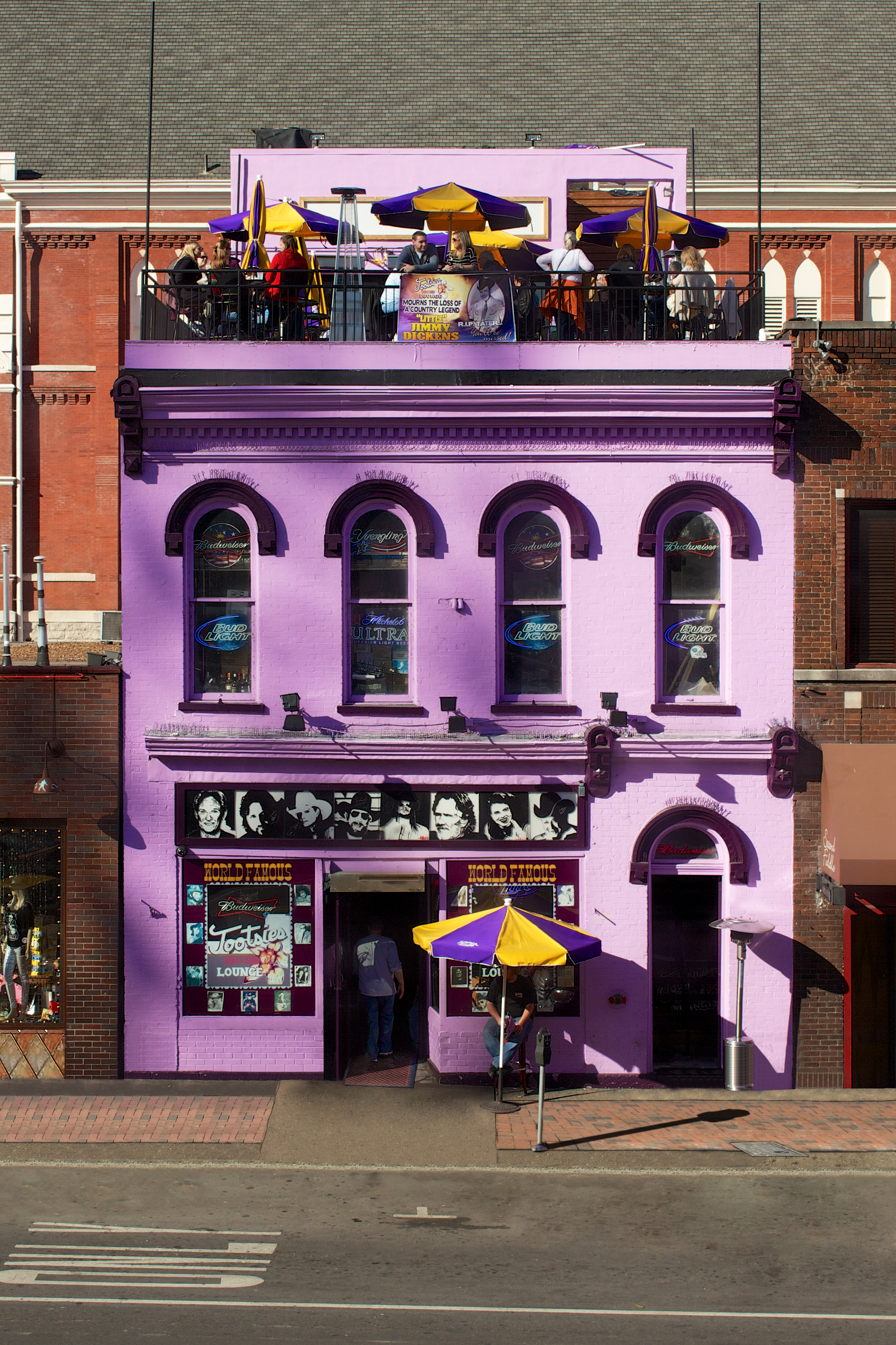
Tootsie's Orchid Lounge is the oldest honky-tonk in Nashville, Tennessee.

The term honky-tonk (also called honkatonk, honkey-tonk, honky tonk, or tonk) refers either to a bar that provides country music for the entertainment of its patrons, or to the particular genre of music which is played at such establishments itself. It can also refer to the type of piano (a tack piano) used to play such music. Bars of this kind are common in the American South and Southwest. Many prominent country music artists such as Jimmie Rodgers, Ernest Tubb, Lefty Frizzell, Hank Williams, Patsy Cline, Johnny Horton and Merle Haggard began their careers as amateur musicians in honky-tonks.

The origin of the term "honky-tonk" is disputed, originally referring to bawdy variety shows in areas of the Old West (Oklahoma, the Indian Territories, and mostly Texas) and to the actual theaters showing them.

The first music genre to be commonly known as honky-tonk was a style of piano playing related to ragtime but emphasizing rhythm more than melody or harmony; the style evolved in response to an environment in which pianos were often poorly maintained, tending to be out of tune and having some nonfunctioning keys. This honky-tonk music was an important influence on the boogie-woogie piano style. Before World War II, the music industry began to refer to hillbilly music being played from Texas and Oklahoma to the West Coast as "honky-tonk" music. In the 1950s, honky-tonk entered its golden age, with the popularity of Webb Pierce, Hank Locklin, Lefty Frizzell, Faron Young, George Jones, and Hank Williams.

== Etymology ==
The origin of the term honky-tonk is unknown. The earliest known use in print is an article in the Peoria Journal dated June 28, 1874, stating, "The police spent a busy day today raiding the bagnios and honkytonks."

There are subsequent citations from 1890 in The Dallas Morning News, 1892 in the Galveston Daily News (Galveston, Texas) (which used the term to refer to an adult establishment in Fort Worth), and in 1894 in The Daily Ardmoreite in Oklahoma. Early uses of the term in print mostly appear along a corridor roughly coinciding with cattle drive trails extending from Dallas and Fort Worth, Texas, into south central Oklahoma, suggesting that the term may have been a localism spread by cowboys driving cattle to market. The sound of honky-tonk (or honk-a-tonk) and the types of places that were called honky-tonks suggests that the term may be an onomatopoeic reference to the loud, boisterous music and noise heard at these establishments.

One theory is that the "tonk" portion of the name may have come from the brand name of piano made by William Tonk & Bros., an American manufacturer of large upright pianos (established 1881), which made a piano with the decal "Ernest A. Tonk". The Tonk brothers, William and Max, established the Tonk Bros. Manufacturing Company in 1873, so such an etymology is possible; however, these pianos were not manufactured until 1889, at which point the term seems to have already been established.

An early source purporting to explain the derivation of the term (spelled honkatonk) was an article published in 1900 by the New York Sun and widely reprinted in other newspapers.

== History ==
An article in the Los Angeles Times of July 28, 1929, with the headline "'Honky-Tonk' Origin Told", which was probably in response to the Sophie Tucker movie musical, Honky Tonk (1929), reads:

Do you know what a honky tonk is?

Seafaring men of a few years ago knew very well, as the honky-tonks of San Francisco's Barbary Coast constituted perhaps the most vivid spots in their generally uneventful lives.

The name originated on the Barbary Coast and was applied to the low "dives" which formed so great a part of this notorious district. In these establishments, which were often of enormous size, much liquor was dispensed at the tables which crowded the floor, and entertainment of doubtful quality was given on a stage at one end of the room.

The honky tonk, as a matter of fact, was the predecessor of the present-day cabaret or night club, the principal differences being that the prices were lower and that the former establishment made no pretense of "class."

In this context of the term’s meaning and its possible origin, an example from roughly the same period is the Harvey Oliver Brooks song “They Call Me Sister Honky-Tonk,” sung by Mae West in the 1933 film I’m No Angel.

Honky-tonks were rough establishments, providing country music in the Deep South and Southwest and serving alcoholic beverages to a working-class clientele. Some honky-tonks offered dancing to music played by pianists or small bands, and some were centers of prostitution. Katrina Hazzard-Gordon wrote that the honky-tonk was "the first urban manifestation of the jook", and that "the name itself became synonymous with a style of music. Related to the classic blues in tonal structure, honky-tonk has a tempo that is slightly stepped up. It is rhythmically suited for many African-American dance."

As Chris Smith and Charles McCarron wrote in their 1916 hit song "Down in Honky Tonk Town", "It's underneath the ground, where all the fun is found."

=== Origins of the establishment ===
Although the derivation of the term is unknown, honky tonk originally referred to bawdy variety shows in the West (Oklahoma and Indian Territories and Texas) and to the theaters housing them. The earliest mention of them in print refers to them as "variety theaters" and describe the entertainment as "variety shows". The theaters often had an attached gambling house and always a bar.

In recollections long after the frontiers closed, writers such as Wyatt Earp and E.C. Abbott referred to honky-tonks in the cowtowns of Kansas, Nebraska, and Montana in the 1870s and 1880s. Their recollections contain lurid accounts of the women and violence accompanying the shows. However, in contemporary accounts these were nearly always called hurdy-gurdy shows, possibly derived from the term hurdy-gurdy, which was sometimes mistakenly applied to a small, portable barrel organ that was frequently played by organ grinders and buskers.

As late as 1913, Col. Edwin Emerson, a former Rough Rider commander, hosted a honky-tonk party in New York City. The Rough Riders were recruited from the ranches of Texas, New Mexico, Oklahoma and Indian Territories, so the term was still in popular use during the Spanish–American War.

=== Regional variations ===
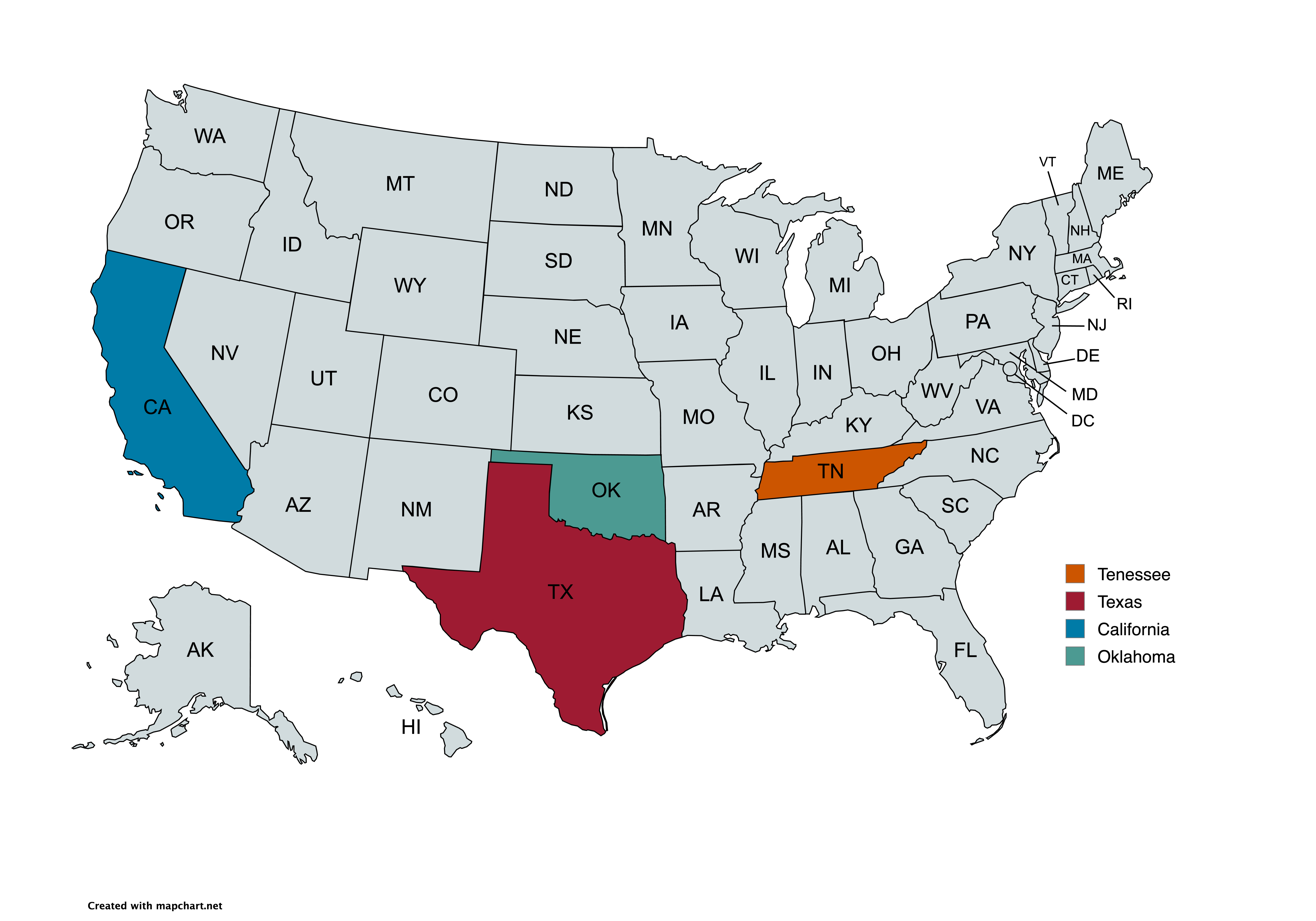
A USA map featuring the four states that influenced Honky Tonk: Texas, Oklahoma, Tennessee, and California

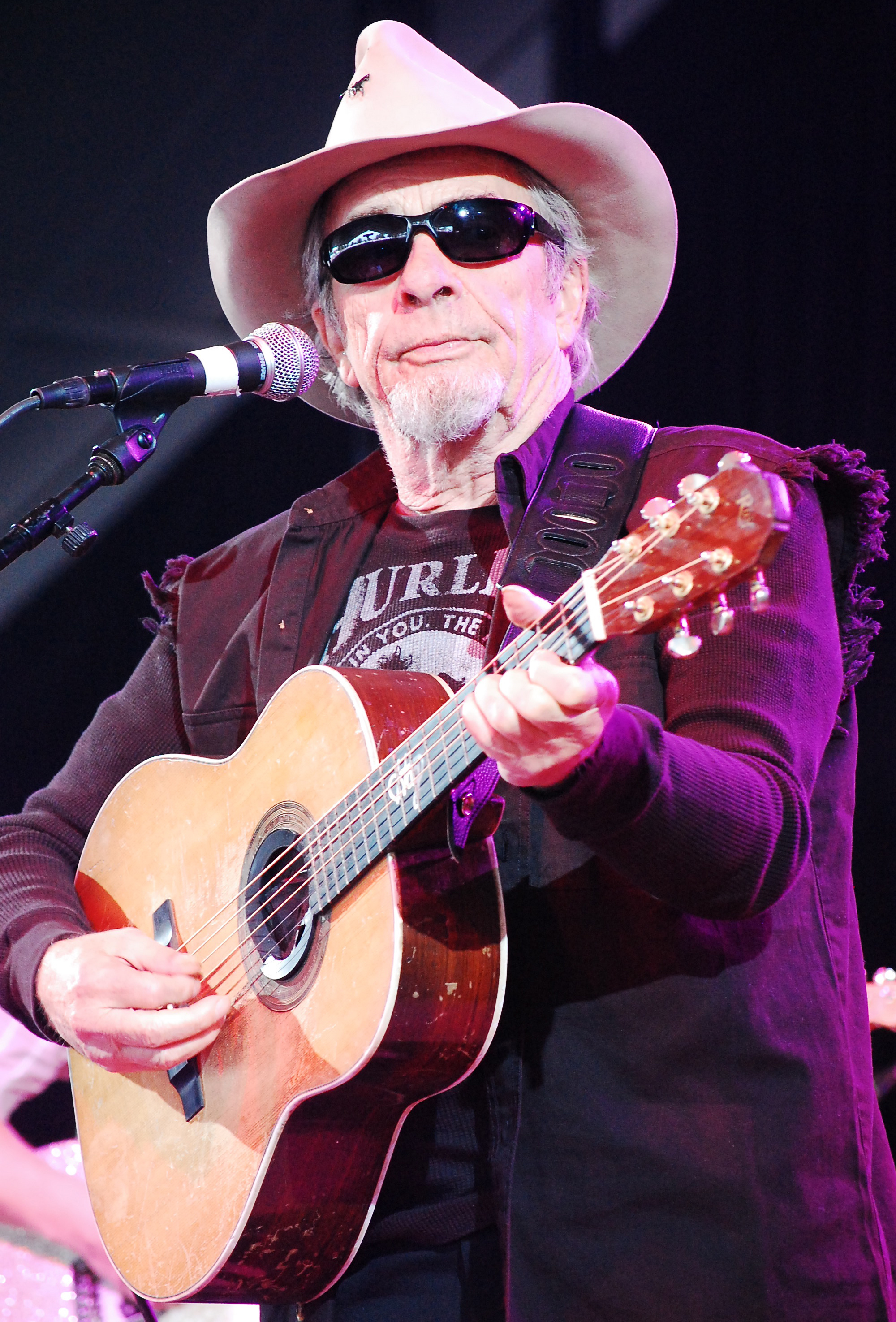
Merle Haggard, an American country music songwriter, singer, and musician (1937–2016)

Although honky tonk music is often associated with the American South, it took on unique regional characteristics in different parts of the United States. Those characteristics were manifested from how local cultures, histories, and migration patterns influenced the sound, style, and settings of honky tonk in key areas.

Honky tonk made its first appearance in the oil boom towns and cattle-driving regions of Texas, Oklahoma, and Louisiana. Over time, it spread west to California and gained national attention through the music industry which was centered in Nashville, Tennessee. Ranging from lyrical themes to dance styles, each of these regions contributed unique features to the honky tonk tradition.

1. Oklahoma – Dust Bowl migration and multi-ethnic musical influences shaped the honky tonk sound in this region. Electric instruments were adopted early on to cut through bar noise, and artists like Johnny Bond and Wanda Jackson began their careers here.
2. Texas – Texas honky tonk evolved around rural dance halls and cowboy culture. Bob Wills, Ernest Tubb, and many others defined the electrified, rhythm-driven sound here. Dance hall traditions and Texas two-step also played a major role in shaping the Texas honky tonk identity.
3. California (Bakersfield) – In the 1960s, children of Oklahoma and Texas migrants living in California pushed back against the polished Nashville Sound and created the grittier Bakersfield Sound. Artists like Merle Haggard became known for their stripped-down, working-class take on honky tonk.
4. Tennessee (Nashville) – While honky tonk was born in bars, Nashville helped bring it to national audiences through venues like the Grand Ole Opry. Over time, however, the rise of the Nashville Sound led to a more polished and commercial version of country music that some saw as a departure from honky tonk’s roots.

=== Evolution of venues ===
Honky-tonks originated in the late 19th century. They were often in the Texas-Oklahoma area, with mostly working-class individuals. The venues were associated with having a rough atmosphere with activities such as drinking and gambling. By the middle of the 20th century, they had a similar reputation, but it changed from the blue-collar crowd into an atmosphere more focused on music and dancing. Today honkey-tonk bars are a mix of music clubs and tourist-friendly bars with some of the aspects of the mid-20th century, including neon beer signs and wooden dance floors.

== Notable bars and landmarks ==
=== Tootsie's Orchid Lounge ===
Tootsie's is located in downtown Nashville Tennessee behind the Ryman Auditorium. Tootsie's is noted as one of the most famous honky tonk bars in the history of honky tonk. The bar was originally opened by Hattie Louise “Tootsie” Bess, the bar got its name after a painter accidentally covered the bar in orchid colored paint. Tootsies quickly became a central location for notable country stars such as Willie Nelson, Patsy Cline, Kris Kristofferson, and Loretta Lynn. Though it declined in popularity after the Grand Ole Opry moved in 1974, it was revived in the 1990s by Steve Smith and is still open to the public to this day.

=== Gilley's Nightclub ===
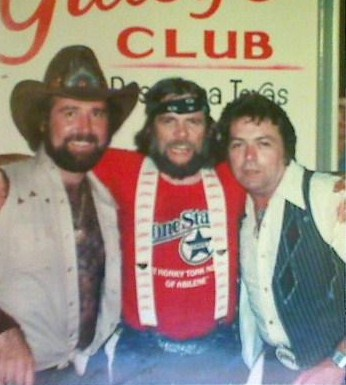
Gilley's Nightclub

Originally named Sherwood Cryer, Gilley’s Nightclub in Pasadena, Texas was opened in 1970. The Nightclub featured a shooting gallery, showers for truckers, a rodeo arena with mechanical bulls, pool tables, punching bags, and a dance floor big enough for thousands. Gilley’s hosted many different musical artists such as Loretta Lynn, Ernest Tubb, Emmylou Harris, and Roseanne Cash, and launched the career of Mickey Gilley. However, in 1988 Mickey Gilley became frustrated with the Nightclub saying the previous owners refused to make renovations, clean the bathroom, and address parking lot issues. This led to him gaining control of the Nightclub after a lawsuit. Later in 1989, the Nightclub had to be closed down due to loss of profits. Then in 1990 the Nightclub burned down and is now no longer operational.

=== Billy Bob's Texas ===
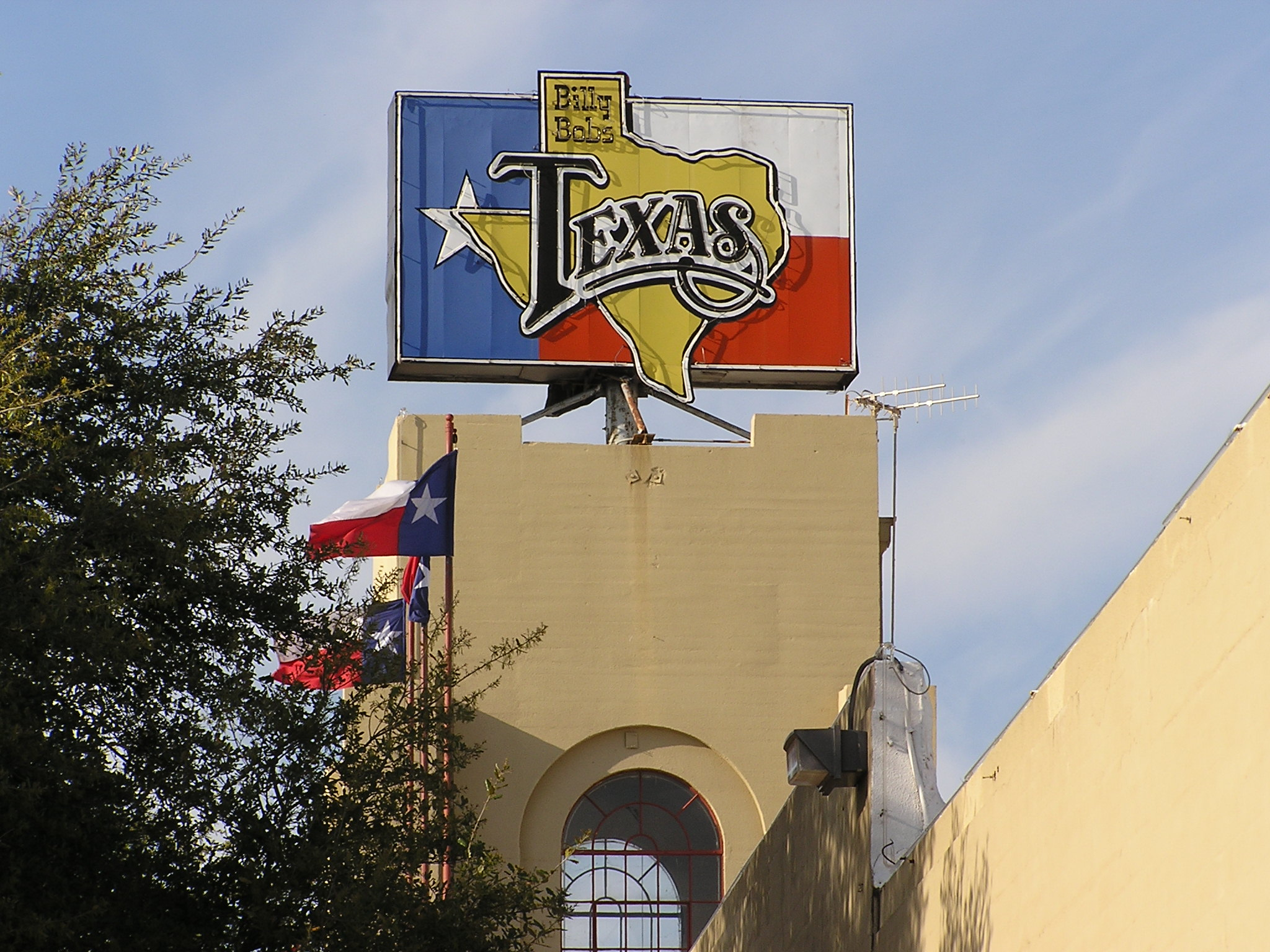
Billy Bob's Texas

Opened in 1981 by Texas A&M graduate and professional football character Billy Bob Barnett, Billy Bob's Texas is located in a former cattle barn in the Fort Worth Stockyards and is known as the World's Largest Honky-Tonk. This building spanned over 100,000 square feet (9,300 m^{2}) and contained multiple dance floors, stages for concerts, and an indoor rodeo arena. Billy Bob's hosted some of the biggest names in country music and even boosted the careers of people such as George Strait, Reba McEntire, Travis Tritt, and many others. Despite all of this success, Billy Bob's Texas closed its doors on January 8, 1988 due to bankruptcy. This was a significant hit to tourism for Fort Worth, TX as Billy Bob's Texas was a major attraction. However, by November 28, 1988, the establishment was saved as some of its original investors returned to help manage it. Billy Bob's Texas remains open today and continues to be a major tourist attraction for country fans.

=== Gruene Hall ===
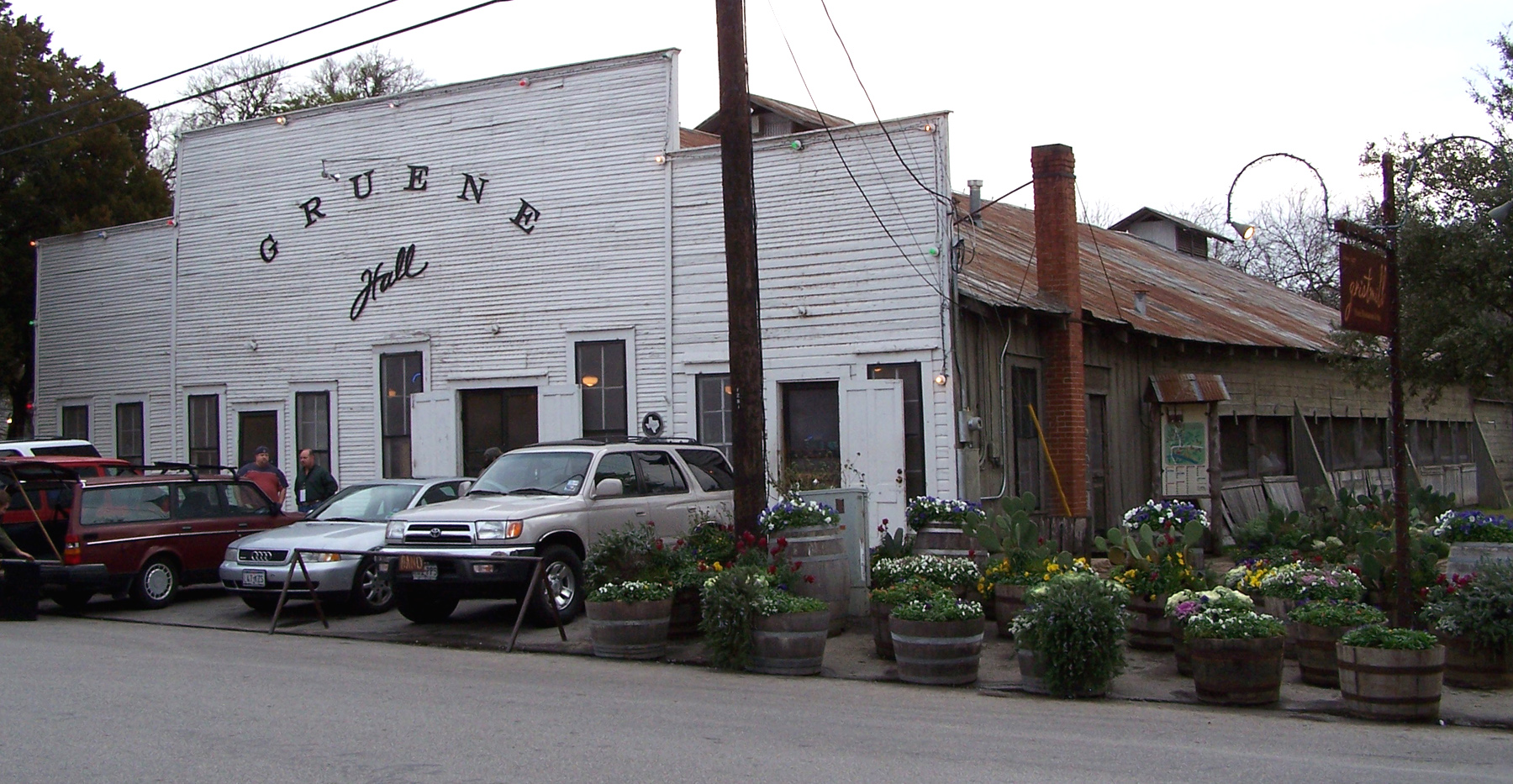
Gruene Hall

Although it may not be labeled as a “honky tonk” Gruene Hall was(and still is) a very influential dance hall for many artist who are considered to be in the Honky Tonk genre. Gruene Hall is known as the oldest dance hall in Texas that is still operational today. Although it was open in 1878, ownership has preserved it over the years, even keeping the same layout as when it first opened. Gruene Hall is a massive 6,000 square foot dance hall that has hosted musicians such as Garth Brooks, Willie Nelson, Merle Haggard, LeAnn Rimes, George Strait, Townes Van Zandt, Jerry Jeff Walker, Lyle Lovett, Hal Ketchum, and Gregg Allman. Gruene hall have been a staple for many Honky Tonk artist and living history for all tourist and Honky Tonk fans to enjoy.

== Dancing and cultural significance ==
Dance has been the centerpiece of the honky-tonk culture for a long time. This genre has more upbeat suited for dancing, typically two-stepping and the jitterbug.

Typically, in the Texas honky-tonks, there are a multitude of folk dances that are done in the halls. Those being the Texas Two-Step, the waltz, and the polka. A Texas historian, Christian Wallace says that "Everything that's important about Texas culture: barbecue, beer, two-steps, waltzes and polkas" (Wallace 2019). Wallace means that these dances foster social connection not just entertainment.

In 1980, the film Urban Cowboy was released. This movie was set in a honkey-tonk, and began a nationwide spread of the country line dancing. The movie portrayed typical honky-tonk dances and mechanical bull rides, spreading the honky-tonk culture as a whole.

== Music ==
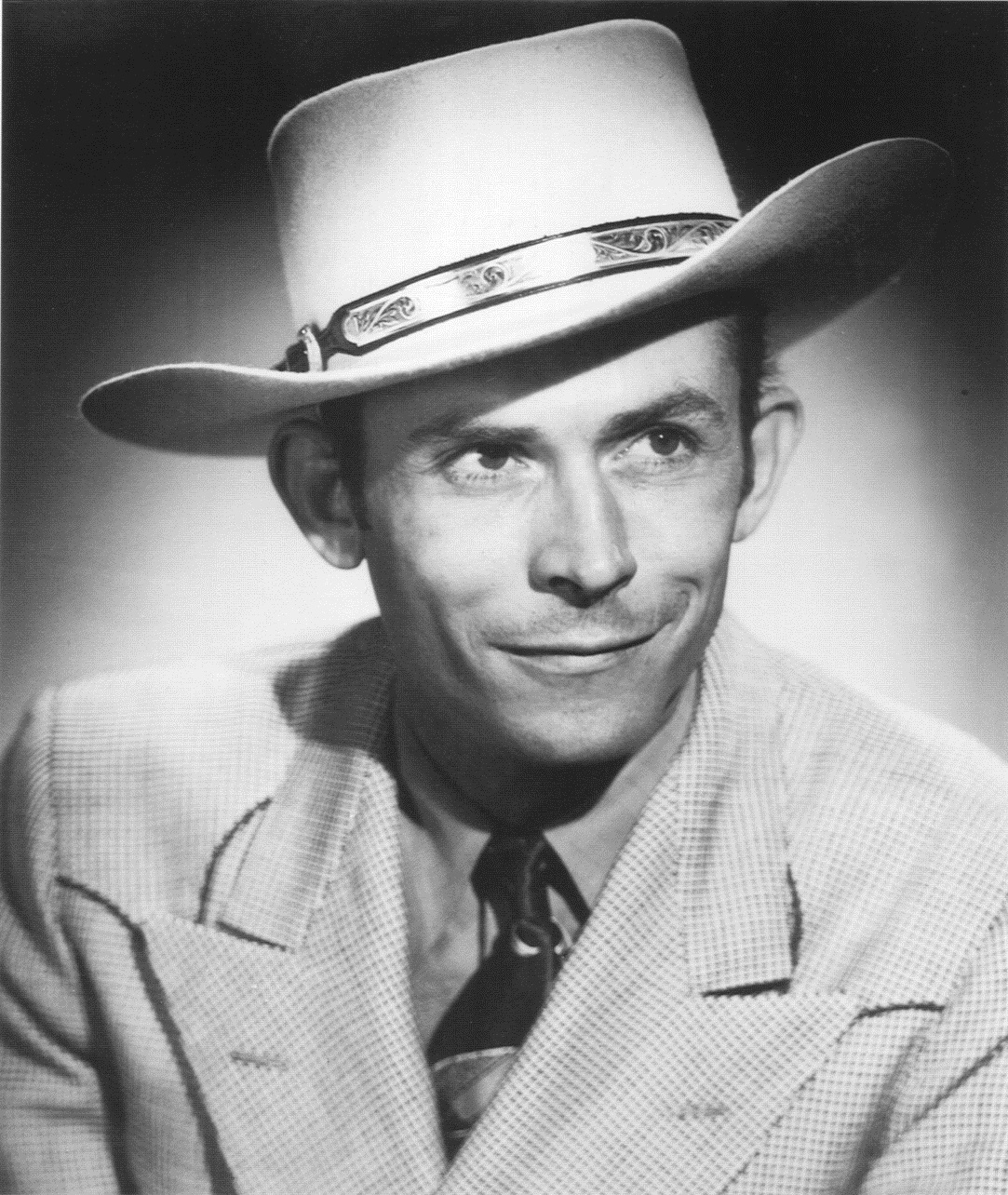
Hank Williams, an influential honky-tonker from the 1940s and early 1950s

The honky-tonk sound has a full rhythm section playing a two-beat rhythm with a crisp backbeat. Steel guitar and fiddle are the dominant instruments.

The first music genre to be commonly known as honky-tonk music was a style of piano playing related to ragtime but emphasizing rhythm more than melody or harmony; the style evolved in response to an environment in which the pianos were often poorly maintained, tending to be out of tune and having some nonfunctioning keys.

Honky-tonk music influenced the boogie-woogie piano style, as indicated by Jelly Roll Morton's 1938 record "Honky Tonk Music" and Meade Lux Lewis's hit "Honky Tonk Train Blues." Lewis recorded the latter many times from 1927 into the 1950s, and the song was covered by many other musicians, including Oscar Peterson.

The twelve-bar blues instrumental "Honky Tonk" by the Bill Doggett Combo, with a sinuous saxophone line and driving, slow beat, was an early rock and roll hit. New Orleans native Fats Domino was another honky-tonk piano man, whose "Blueberry Hill" and "Walkin' to New Orleans" were hits on the popular music charts.

In the years before World War II, the music industry began to refer to honky-tonk music played from Texas and Oklahoma to the West Coast as hillbilly music. More recently, the term has come to refer to the primary sound in country music, developing in Nashville as Western swing became accepted there. Originally, it featured the guitar, fiddle, string bass, and steel guitar (imported from Hawaiian folk music). The vocals were originally rough and nasal, as exemplified by the singer-songwriters Floyd Tillman and Hank Williams, but later developed a clear and sharp sound, such as that of George Jones and Faron Young. Lyrics tended to focus on working-class life, with frequently tragic themes of lost love, adultery, loneliness, alcoholism, and self-pity.

Copyrighted and released in 1941, "Walking the Floor Over You", by Ernest Tubb, his sixth release for Decca, helped establish the honky-tonk style and Tubb as one of its foremost practitioners. Tubb, from Crisp, Texas, was a fan of Jimmie Rodgers and fused Western swing, which had been using electric guitars for years, with other "country" sounds.

He took the sound to Nashville, where he was the first musician to play electric guitar on Grand Ole Opry. In the 1950s, honky tonk entered its golden age, with the popularity of Webb Pierce, Hank Locklin, Lefty Frizzell, Faron Young, George Jones, and Hank Williams. In the mid- to late 1950s, rockabilly (which melded honky-tonk country with rhythm and blues) and the slick country music of the Nashville sound ended honky-tonk's initial period of dominance.

The Rolling Stones' number-one single and gold record "Honky Tonk Women" (1969) was based on the sound of 1940s honky-tonk artists like Hank Williams and referred to the reputation of honky-tonk bars as centres of prostitution. In the 1970s, outlaw country's brand of rough honky-tonk was represented by artists such as Gary Stewart, Waylon Jennings, Willie Nelson, David Allan Coe, and Billy Joe Shaver.

== See also ==
- Dive bar
- Juke joint
- List of public house topics
- Country music
- Honky

== Bibliography ==
- Abbott, E.C. (2000). We Pointed Them North: Recollections of a Cowpuncher. Norman: University of Oklahoma Press. ISBN 0-8061-1366-9.
- American Dialect Society (2005). "Honkatonk (1900, from wild geese?)". American Dialect Society. Retrieved July 16, 2006.
- Boyd, Jean Ann (1998). Jazz of the Southwest: An Oral History of Western Swing. Austin: University of Texas Press. ISBN 0-292-70860-2.
- Dary, David (1989). Cowboy Culture: A Saga of Five Centuries. University Press of Kansas. Reprint ed. ISBN 0-7006-0390-5.
- Hunter, J. Marvin (ed.) (1993). Trail Drivers of Texas: Interesting Sketches of Early Cowboys. Austin: University of Texas Press. Reprint of 1925 edition. ISBN 0-292-73076-4.
- Kienzle, Rich (2003). Southwest Shuffle: Pioneers of Honky Tonk, Western Swing, and Country Jazz. New York: Routledge. ISBN 0-415-94102-4.
- Lake, Stuart (1994). Wyatt Earp: Frontier Marshal. Pocket. Reprint ed. ISBN 0-671-88537-5.
- Pierce, Bob; Ashley, Larry (1996). Pierce Piano Atlas (10th ed.). ISBN 0-911138-02-1.
- Shay, Anthony. Boys Night Out in Leadville. Retrieved July 16, 2006.
- Tennessean Tootsies' 56th Birthday Bash October 2016
- "What is a "Honky-Tonk?" The History & Surprising Facts'". Country Dancing Tonight. January 2025.
- Oklahoma Historical Society. "Country Music." Encyclopedia of Oklahoma History and Culture. (Author: John W. Troutman)
- TMLIRP (2019). "10 Legendary Texas Dance Halls and Honky-Tonks." Via Texas Monthly. (Author: Christian Wallace)
- World, Our Music (2023). "Honky-Tonk Music: A Full Exploration."
- University of Texas. "The Nashville Sound – The History of Country Music." Department of Rhetoric & Writing, University of Texas. Accessed April 5, 2025.
- EBSCO. "Nashville Sound – Music Research Starter." EBSCO Research Starters. Accessed April 5, 2025.
- Visit Bakersfield. "The Bakersfield Sound." Official Tourism Site for Bakersfield. Accessed April 5, 2025.
- PBS. "The Bakersfield Sound – Branches of Country Music." PBS Country Music Series. Accessed April 5, 2025.
