= George Orendorff =

American jazz musician

George Robert Orendorff (March 18, 1906 - June 28, 1984) was an American jazz trumpeter.

Orendorff was born in Atlanta but his family moved to Chicago when he was nine years old. He learned guitar before picking up cornet, and played early in his career in Chicago dance bands. In 1925 he moved to Los Angeles, where he played with Paul Howard from 1925 to 1930. He played with Les Hite for most of the 1930s and recorded with Louis Armstrong in 1930-1931. In the 1940s he accompanied Ceele Burke, and worked with Maxwell Davis, Ike Lloyd, and T-Bone Walker among others later in his career.
