= Red Mack (musician) =

American jazz musician

Morris McClure, better known under the stage name Red Mack (born January 18, 1912, Memphis, Tennessee - June 14, 1993, Los Angeles, California) was an American jazz trumpeter and vocalist.

Mack was raised in Los Angeles and was a pianist for his local Church of God in Christ as a youth. After learning trumpet as a teenager, he played with Sonny Clay and Les Hite, the latter alongside Louis Armstrong. From 1931 to 1933 he worked with Charlie Echols, then joined Gene Coy's band in Chicago; around this time he also played with Erskine Tate. He moved back to Los Angeles and worked again with Echols as a drummer in 1934, and worked later in the decade with Floyd Ray, Alton Redd, Lorenzo Flennoy, and Lionel Hampton. He also appeared in several Hollywood films.

Around 1940 he joined Will Osborne's band; as a black musician, Mack's arrival made the group interracial, and Mack was often treated poorly as a result. The group disbanded in 1941, and Mack moved back to Los Angeles once again, working there with Lee Young, Monette Moore, Barney Bigard, and Kid Ory. He toured Alaska with Luke Jones in 1945 and worked with him for several years thereafter, as well as with Jimmy Mundy and with his own ensembles. A group led by Mack was the house band at The Downbeat, a Los Angeles jazz club, late in the 1950s. He was cast as a bandmember of Kid Ory's in the 1955 film The Benny Goodman Story, but he does not play on the soundtrack; his on-screen trumpeting is actually performed by Alvin Alcorn. He was less active as a trumpeter later in his career but continued to perform on keyboards into the 1970s.

== Filmography ==
- Every Day's a Holiday (1937)
- Going Places (1938)
- You'll Never Get Rich (1941)
- The Benny Goodman Story (1955)
