= Love in the First Degree =

Love in the First Degree may refer to:

- "Love in the First Degree" (Alabama song), 1981
- "Love in the First Degree" (Bananarama song), 1987
- "Love in the first degree", a 1936 song written by Harvey Brooks
- Love in the First Degree, 2004 Australian comedy film with Joy Smithers and Alexandra Fowler
