= Harvey Brooks (composer) =

American pianist, composer, and bandleader

- Born: February 17, 1899 Philadelphia, Pennsylvania, U.S.
- Died: June 17, 1968 (aged 69) Los Angeles, California, U.S.
- Genres: Jazz
- Instruments: Piano

Harvey Oliver Brooks (February 17, 1899 – June 17, 1968) was an American pianist and composer. He is the first black American to have written a complete score for a major motion picture: Mae West's film I'm No Angel (1933).

== Career ==
Brooks toured and recorded with Mamie Smith in the early-1920s, then settled in California. Beginning in 1923, he and Paul Howard co-led the Quality Four, a quartet with vocalist named after the Quality Cafe at 12th and Central in Los Angeles. Its members included Paul Howard on clarinet and tenor saxophone.

Brooks recorded with the Quality Four and Howard's Quality Serenaders. He remained a member of both until 1930. Brooks was the music director for Les Hite’s orchestra from 1931 to 1935. In this role, he worked for Hollywood film studios, composing soundtrack music. Brooks later worked as a leader of his own band, played in Kid Ory’s band (from 1952), and performed and recorded with Teddy Buckner (1955–1956) and Joe Darensbourg (1957–1960). Beginning 1961, he became a member of the Young Men of New Orleans (dixieland jazz group), which he led in the last year of his life.

In season three of the Netflix TV series Big Mouth, Brooks is shown mentoring a young Duke Ellington.

== Selected discography ==
- Paul Howard's Quality Serenaders, recorded in Culver City, California April 29, 1929

50877-1 – Stuff (stomp), Lionel Hampton (vocal), music by Brooks, Victor (V–38122–B)
George Orendorff (trumpet), Lawrence Brown (trombone, arranger), Charlie Lawrence (clarinet, alto sax, arranger), Paul Howard (tenor sax, director), Harvey Brooks (piano), Thomas Valentine (banjo, guitar), James Jackson (tuba), Lionel Hampton (drums, vocal)

- Joe Darensbourg and his Dixie Flyers, recorded live at The Lark, Los Angeles, October 1957

Live, American Music Records (1957) (re-released 1997) OCLC 48525562
Musicians: Mike Delay (trumpet), Warren Smith (trombone), Joe Darensbourg (clarinet, soprano sax, vocal), Harvey O. Brooks (piano), Al Morgan (bass), George Vann (drums, vocal), Richard Kenner (vocal)

== Filmography ==
- I'm No Angel (1933)
- I Found A New Way To Go To Town (1933)
  music by Harvey O. Brooks
  lyrics by Gladys DuBois and Ben Ellison
  (uncredited)
  sung by Mae West
- I Want You, I Need You (1933)
  music by Harvey O. Brooks
  lyrics by Ben Ellison
  (uncredited)
  played on a piano and sung by Mae West
- I'm No Angel (1933)
  music by Harvey Brooks
  lyrics by Gladys DuBois and Ben Ellison
  (uncredited)
  sung by Mae West at the end and during the closing credits
- (No One Love Me Like) That Dallas Man (1933)
  music by Harvey O. Brooks
  lyrics by Gladys DuBois and Ben Ellison
  (uncredited)
  played on a record on which Mae West sings
- They Call Me Sister Honky Tonk (1933)
  music by Harvey O. Brooks
  lyrics by Gladys DuBois and Ben Ellison
  (uncredited)
  sung by Mae West
- Dark Manhattan, with Ben Ellison

== Other selected compositions ==
- Blow, Man, Blow!
  words & music by Harvey O. Brooks & Ellis Lawrence Walsh
- Finger Wave (1936)
  music by Harvey O. Brooks
- It's A Mighty Pretty Night For Love
  music by Harvey O. Brooks
- A Little Bird Told Me (1947)
  music by Harvey O. Brooks
  see Federal court case over "covering"
- Love In The First Degree (1936)
  music by Harvey O. Brooks
- Shack In The Back (1936)
  music by Harvey O. Brooks
- That's The One For Me
  music by Harvey O. Brooks & Ellis Lawrence Walsh
