= Eddie Beal =

American jazz pianist (1910–1984)

Eddie Beal (June 13, 1910, Redlands, California – December 15, 1984, Los Angeles) was an American jazz pianist. He was the brother of Charlie Beal.

Beal started on drums but switched to piano in his teens. Early in the 1930s he worked in the orchestras of Earl Dancer and Charlie Echols. From 1933 to 1936 he toured China with Buck Clayton, then freelanced in California (with Maxine Sullivan, among others) until 1941. After military service from 1943–45, he accompanied Ivie Anderson, and led his own trio which accompanied Billie Holiday at one point. Beal composed the kiss sequence in the Merrie Melodies cartoon Coal Black and de Sebben Dwarfs. He also worked in the Spirits of Rhythm. As a composer, he penned the tunes "Softly" (covered by Holliday) and "Bye and Bye", a hit for The Turbans. He plays on the soundtrack to the 1951 film The Strip; he also makes an appearance in the film. Later recording credits include work with Jimmy Mundy, Herb Jeffries, Helen Humes, Red Callender, and others. He led his own group in Las Vegas, Nevada in 1973-74, and in 1974-75 he played with Tommy Dorsey.

== Discography ==
Track Performances

- Married Man Blues (1946) By Helen Humes And All Stars
- Lost Love (1951) by Percy Mayfield And Orchestra
- Swingin' Suite (1956) By Red Callender And His Modern Octet
- The Lowest (1958) By Red Callender
- The Rising Surf (1963) By Richie Allen (AKA Richard Allen) And The Pacific Surfers
- The Hunt Is On (1982) By Percy Mayfield With Monroe Tucker & His Orchestra
- Hopeless (1982) By Percy Mayfield With Monroe Tucker & His Orchestra
- Two Hearts Are Greater Than One (1982) By Percy Mayfield With Monroe Tucker & His Orchestra
- Candy Store Blues (1988) By Toni Harper
- Sam's Song (The Happy Tune) (1988) By Toni Harper
- Happy Feet (1988) By Toni Harper
- The Dish Rag (Rub A Dub Dub) (1988) By Toni Harper
- Get Up (1988) By Toni Harper
- Dolly's Lullaby (1988) By Toni Harper
- I Dream Of Jeanie With The Light Brown Hair (1998) By Maxine Sullivan
- I'm Happy About The Whole Thing (1998) By Maxine Sullivan
- Surfers' Slide (2006) By Richie Allen And The Pacific Surfers
- If I Had You By Flora Washington With Eddie Beal Trio
- What Will I Tell My Heart By Flora Washington With Eddie Beal Trio

Writing and Compositions

- Sweet Riley O'Toole (1954) By Ken Hanna And His Orchestra
- Move On (1957) By The Blossoms
- Young Heartaches (1958) By Ben Joe Zeppa
- Who Slammed The Door (1958) By Little Caesar With Eddie Beal And His Orchestra
- I'm Reachin' (1958) By Little Caesar With Eddie Beal And His Orchestra
- Let's Close The Door (1964) By Georgia Carr
- Softly (1964) By Georgia Carr
- Once To Ev'ry Girl (1964) By Georgia Carr
- Skoot (1972) By Stan Kenton And His Orchestra
- Candy Store Blues (1988) By Toni Harper
- You're Too Tall, I'm Too Small (1988) By Toni Harper
- All Because Of You (1989) By Dinah Washington
- Softly (Baby) (1989) By Dinah Washington
- Softly (1990) By Billie Holiday
- Bye and Bye (1992) By The Turbans

Arrangements

- When Does Friendship End And True Love Start (1962) By Debbie Stuart
- Does Your Heart Beat For Me (1962) By Debbie Stuart
