= Charlie Echols =

American jazz trumpeter and bandleader (active 1930s)

Charlie Echols was an American jazz trumpeter and bandleader. He led several California-based dance bands in the 1930s that featured a large number of important early jazz and swing sidemen.

Almost nothing is known of Echols's own life, including his birth and death dates; most of what is known about him is reconstructed from oral history interviews done by Albert McCarthy with musicians who had played in his bands, though the group did receive coverage in contemporaneous newspapers. Echols led a band based in Los Angeles starting in 1931, whose membership included Babe Carter, Herman Pettis, Lorenzo Flennoy, Lawrence Brown, Red Mack, and Peppy Prince. The group was revamped in 1932 with Prince remaining and Bumps Myers and Kid Ory joining; soon after Jack McVea, Eddie Beal, Buddy Banks, and Alton Redd were added to the lineup. Echols left this ensemble and Flennoy became its leader in 1934; Echols then formed a new group with Red Mack, Andy Blakeney, Paul Howard, Johnny Miller, and Lionel Hampton, which played at Los Angeles's Cotton Club. Echols then retook leadership of the previous ensemble in 1935, again with an altered lineup - McVea remained with the group, and Buck Clayton, Tyree Glenn, Don Byas, and Herschel Evans all played with it. Later in the 1930s, he led yet another band which included Ernie Royal, Al Morgan, and Lee Young, alongside Bumps Myers and Paul Howard. By the early 1940s he appears to have left music. Because he never recorded, his bands were never heralded by later jazz scholars and critics, but "many of the musicians who played in bands led by Echols recalled it with great affection and admiration".
