= The Benny Goodman Story =

1956 film by Valentine Davies

- Directed by: Valentine Davies
- Written by: Valentine Davies
- Produced by: Aaron Rosenberg
- Starring: Steve Allen; Donna Reed; Gene Krupa; Lionel Hampton; Ben Pollack; Teddy Wilson; Edward "Kid" Ory; Harry James; Martha Tilton; Ziggy Elman
- Cinematography: William H. Daniels
- Edited by: Russell Schoengarth
- Music by: Joseph Gershenson; Henry Mancini; Sol Yaged; Alan Harding; Harold Brown
- Distributed by: Universal-International
- Release date: February 2, 1956
- Running time: 116 minutes
- Country: United States
- Language: English
- Box office: $2.7 million (US)

The Benny Goodman Story is a 1956 American musical biographical film starring Steve Allen and Donna Reed, written and directed by Valentine Davies, and released by Universal-International. The film was intended as a follow-up to Universal's 1954 hit The Glenn Miller Story, dramatizing a popular bandleader's life.

== Plot ==
The young Benny Goodman is taught classical clarinet by a Chicago music professor. He is advised by bandleader Kid Ory to play whichever kind of music he likes best. Benny begins his professional career by joining the Ben Pollack traveling band.

Later in New York, where his new band gets a lukewarm reception, Benny meets jazz lover John Hammond and his sister Alice. He is invited to the stately Hammond home to perform Mozart's Clarinet Concerto. Alice fears he will be embarrassed, but his playing is impeccable and Benny appreciates her concern.

Benny's performances on a popular Saturday night radio program result in Fletcher Henderson volunteering to do some arrangements for him. On the west coast, the radio show's early start has made Benny's music a sensation with a younger generation. He puts together a quartet featuring Gene Krupa on drums, Teddy Wilson on piano and Lionel Hampton on vibraphone.

The romance with society girl Alice is disconcerting to Benny's mother, but by the time her son plays Carnegie Hall, all is well and Mrs. Goodman has personally invited her future daughter-in-law to sit by her side.

== Cast ==
- Steve Allen as Benny Goodman
- Donna Reed as Alice Hammond
- Berta Gersten as Dora Goodman
- Herbert Anderson as John Hammond
- Robert F. Simon as David Goodman
- Sammy Davis Sr. as Fletcher Henderson
- Dick Winslow as Gil Rodin
- David Kasday as 10-year-old Benny Goodman
- Barry Truex as 16-year-old Benny Goodman
- Hy Averback as Willard Alexander
- Wilton Graff as Mr. Hammond
- Shep Menken as Harry Goodman

The following people appeared in the film as themselves:

- Harry James
- Gene Krupa
- Martha Tilton
- Lionel Hampton
- Ziggy Elman
- Ben Pollack
- Teddy Wilson
- Edward "Kid" Ory
- Stan Getz

== Production ==
Benny Goodman recorded most of the clarinet for the soundtrack—except for the opening scenes, where the juvenile Goodman is shown practicing the instrument. Goodman was by then so accomplished that he could no longer reproduce the sound of an amateur clarinetist. The film's star, Steve Allen, was himself a pianist but had never played clarinet, and the squeaky attempts of a beginner were the only sounds Allen could make on a clarinet. Thus the clarinet heard during the film's first scenes was played by Steve Allen.

Many of Goodman's contemporaries made appearances in this film. However, while Ziggy Elman appeared on screen recreating his trumpet solo on "And the Angels Sing", he was unable to record his portion for the soundtrack; Mannie Klein performed it, off-camera. Similarly, Red Mack's performance in the film is played by Alvin Alcorn.

Fletcher Henderson is portrayed by Sammy Davis Sr., father of Sammy Davis Jr.

Talent scout John Hammond was dissatisfied with the way he and the rest of the Hammond family, including his sister Alice, were portrayed in the movie. He objected and the next version of the script saw his character completely removed, with all of his actions given over to another character, Willard Alexander, Goodman's manager. Hammond objected even more strenuously, pointing out that, among many other things, Willard Alexander did not host the party in the Hammond mansion where Goodman first played Mozart publicly, nor did he introduce Alice to Benny. In the end, Hammond reluctantly agreed to leave his portrayal in the film, though he sued for $50,000 for being portrayed in what he thought was an unflattering manner.

The film captures several major moments in Goodman's life but has been described as less than accurate in details. Goodman's Jewish background is mentioned only implicitly, despite its playing a part in his artistic and personal endeavors for decades. In one scene, where his mother tries to talk him out of a romance with Alice Hammond (played by Donna Reed), whom Goodman eventually married, she says, "Bagels and caviar don't mix."
