= Ivie Anderson =

American jazz singer (1905–1949)

Background information
- Also known as: Ivy Anderson
- Born: July 10, 1905; Gilroy, California, U.S.
- Died: December 28, 1949 (aged 44) Los Angeles, California, U.S.
- Genre: Jazz
- Occupation: Singer
- Instrument: Vocals
- Formerly of: Duke Ellington Orchestra

Ivie Anderson (July 10, 1905 – December 28, 1949) was an American jazz singer. Born in Gilroy, California, Anderson was a member of the Duke Ellington Orchestra for more than a decade.

== Early life ==
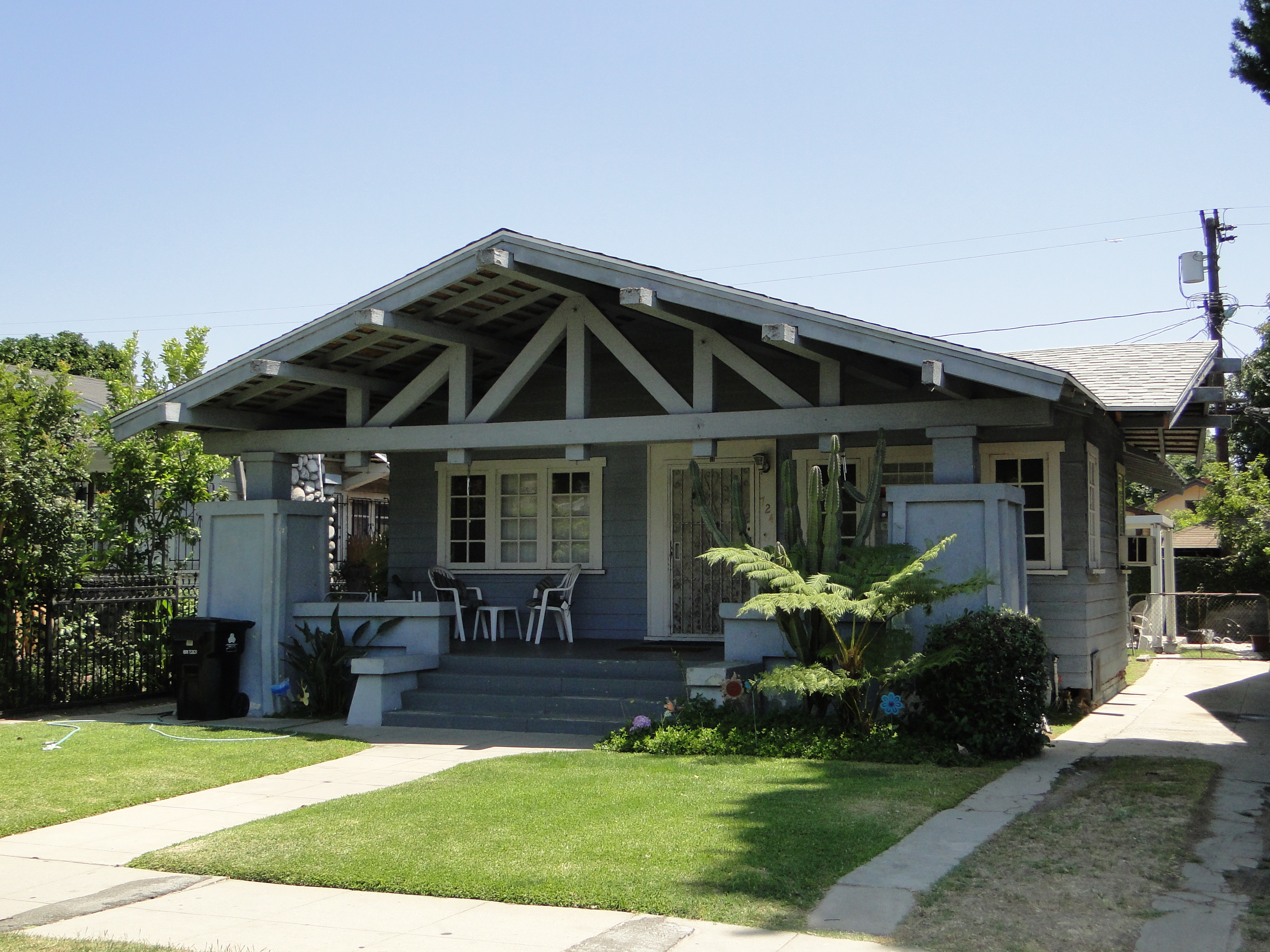
Anderson lived at 724 E. 52nd Place from 1930 to 1945 (part of the 52nd Place Historic District).

Ivie Anderson was born on July 10, 1905, in Gilroy, California, to father Jobe Smith and an unknown mother. From 1914 to 1918, Anderson attended St. Mary's Convent and studied voice. At Gilroy Grammar School and Gilroy High School, she joined glee club and choral society. She studied voice under Sara Ritt while at the Nannie H. Burroughs Institution in Washington, D.C. From 1930 to 1945, Anderson lived at 724 East 52nd Place in Los Angeles, part of the 52nd Place Historic District.

== Career ==
Anderson's singing career began around 1921 with performances in Los Angeles. In 1924, she toured with the musical Shuffle Along. By 1925, she had performed in Cuba, the Cotton Club in New York City, and Los Angeles with the bands of Paul Howard, Curtis Mosby, and Sonny Clay. In 1928, she sang in Australia with Clay's band and starred in Frank Sebastian's Cotton Club in Los Angeles in April. Soon after, she began touring in the United States as a solo singer.

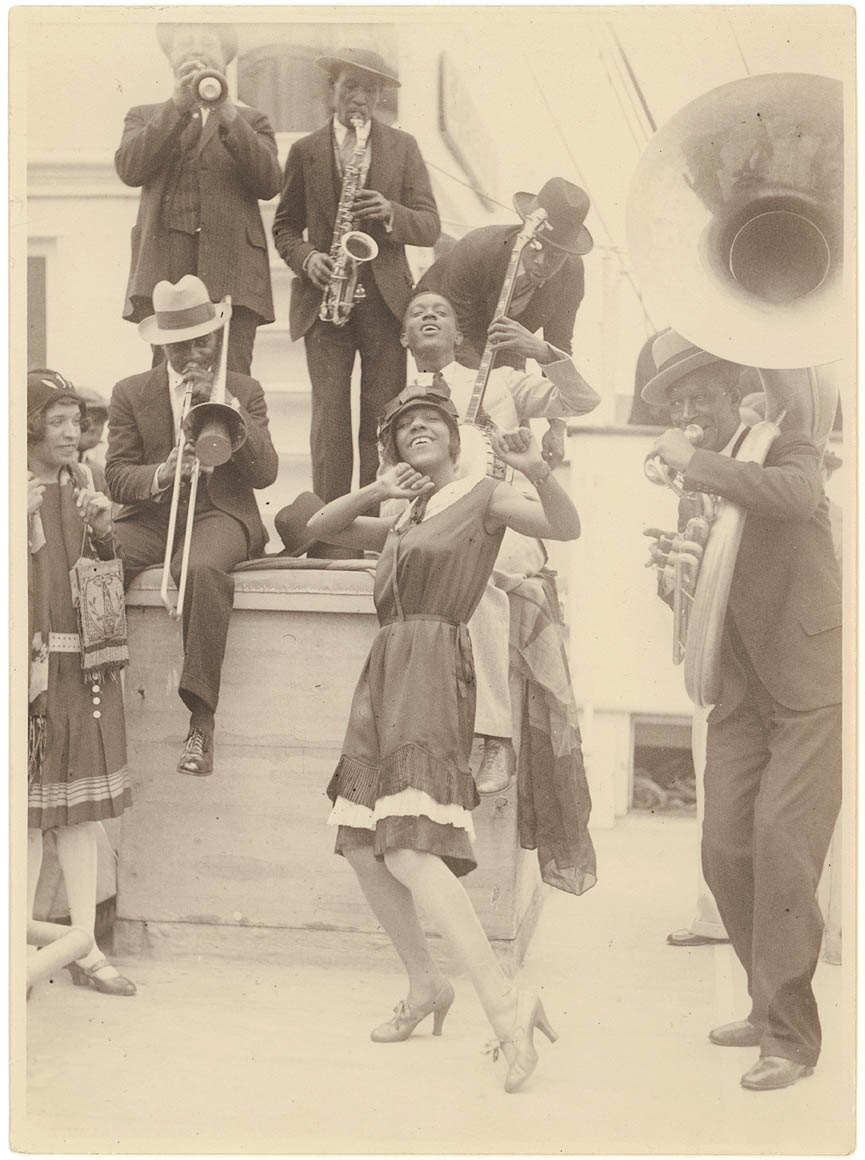
Anderson with The Colored Idea Band of Sonny Clay in Sydney in 1928

From 1930 to early 1931, with pianist Earl Hines's band, Anderson performed in a 20-week residency at the Grand Terrace in Chicago, Illinois. In 1931, she became the first full-time vocalist in the Duke Ellington orchestra. Her career for over a decade consisted of touring with Ellington. Her first appearance on record, "It Don't Mean a Thing (If It Ain't Got That Swing)", recorded in 1932, was a hit. She participated in Ellington's first European tour in 1933. In 1940, she recorded "Solitude", "Mood Indigo", and "Stormy Weather". One of the rare occasions Anderson sang independently of Ellington in this period was her performance of "All God's Children Got Rhythm" in the Marx Brothers film A Day at the Races (1937) for Metro-Goldwyn-Mayer.

Owing to her chronic asthma, Anderson left Ellington's band in 1942. She started the Chicken Shack restaurant in Los Angeles with Marque Neal after they married but sold the business when they divorced. She had a second marriage with Walter Collins. Anderson died in Los Angeles in December 1949 of an asthma-related illness. Although her earliest obituary was dated December 27, 1949, later sources state her date of death as December 28, 1949.

== Comments about Ivie Anderson ==
Anderson often received prominent billing on advertisements for Ellington's appearances in theatres, auditoriums, arenas, and ballrooms, wherever the Ellington band toured in the 1930s. She sang pop tunes and ballads and was the band's scat singer, imitating instrumental sounds and vocalizations. She was said to be one of Ellington's finest and most versatile singers before Swedish vocalist Alice Babs performed with the band. Ellington wrote Music Is My Mistress (1973) with Anderson in mind.

When Anderson played in Ellington's musical Jump for Joy, the California Eagle wrote of her:

"Ivie can sing a song so that the audience get every word, and at the same time make cracks at Sonny Greer, tease Duke and wink at the boys in the front row. Wednesday night she went into a dance routine that would have slayed you."

== Discography ==
1932

- "It Don't Mean a Thing (If It Ain't Got That Swing)" (Brunswick 6265) February 2, 1932
- "Delta Bound" (Columbia 37298) December 21, 1932 (not issued until 1947)

1933

- "I've Got the World on a String" (UK Columbia CB-625) February 15, 1933 (recorded in New York City, but only issued overseas)
- "Happy as the Day is Long" (Brunswick 6571) May 9, 1933
- "Raisin' the Rent" (Brunswick 6571) May 9, 1933
- "Get Yourself a New Broom (And Sweep Your Blues Away)" (Brunswick 6607) May 9, 1933
- "Stormy Weather" (Brunswick 6600) May 16, 1933 (quoted in Stuart Nicholson's book "Reminiscing in Tempo" page 131; Gioia 2012, p. 407)
- "I'm Satisfied" (Brunswick 6638) August 15, 1933

1934

- "Ebony Rhapsody" (Victor 24622) April 12, 1934
- "Troubled Waters" (Victor 24651) May 9, 1934
- "My Old Flame" (Victor 24651) May 9, 1934

1935

- "Let's Have a Jubilee" (unissued on 78) January 9, 1935
- "Cotton" (Brunswick 7525) August 19, 1935
- "Truckin'" (Brunswick 7514) August 19, 1935

1936

- "Dinah Lou" (unissued on 78) January 20, 1936
- "Isn't Love the Strangest Thing?" (Brunswick 7625) February 27, 1936
- "Love is Like a Cigarette" (Brunswick 7627) February 28, 1936
- "Kissin' My Baby Good-Night" (Brunswick 7627) February 28, 1936
- "Oh, Babe! Maybe Someday" (Brunswick 7667) February 28, 1936
- "Shoe Shine Boy" (Brunswick 7710) July 17, 1936
- "It Was a Sad Night in Harlem" (Brunswick 7710) July 17, 1936

1937

- "I've Got To Be a Rug Cutter" (Master MA-101) March 5, 1937
- "My Honey's Lovin' Arms" (as The Gotham Stompers) (Variety VA-629) March 25, 1937
- "Did Anyone Ever Tell You?" (as The Gotham Stompers) (Variety VA-541) March 25, 1937
- "Where Are You?" (as The Gotham Stompers) (Variety VA-541) March 25, 1937

(The Gotham Stompers session included members of Ellington's band plus members of Chick Webb's.)

- "There's a Lull in My Life" (Master MA-117) April 9, 1937
- "It's Swell of You" (Master MA-117) April 9, 1937
- "Old Plantation" (as Ivie Anderson and Her Boys From Dixie) (Variety VA-591) April 22, 1937
- "All God's Chillun Got Rhythm" (as Ivie Anderson and Her Boys From Dixie) (Variety VA-591) June 8, 1937
- "Alabamy Home" (Master VA-137) June 8, 1937

1938

- "If You Were in My Place (What Would You Do?)" (Brunswick 8093) February 24, 1938
- "Scrounch" (Brunswick 8093) February 24, 1938
- "Carnival in Caroline" (Brunswick 8099) March 3, 1938
- "Swingtime in Honolulu" (Brunswick 8131) April 11, 1938
- "You Gave Me the Gate (And I'm Swingin')" (Brunswick 8169) June 7, 1938
- "Rose of the Rio Grande" (Brunswick 8186) June 7, 1938
- "When My Sugar Walks Down the Street" (Brunswick 8168) June 7, 1938
- "Watermelon Man" (Brunswick 8200) June 20, 1938
- "La De Doody Do" (Brunswick 8174) June 20, 1938

1939

- "In a Mizz" (Brunswick 8405) June 12, 1939
- "I'm Checkin' Out – Go'om Bye" (Columbia 35208) June 12, 1939
- "A Lonely Co-Ed" (Columbia 35240) June 12, 1939
- "You Can Count On Me" (Brunswick 8411) June 12, 1939
- "Killin' Myself" (Columbia 35640) October 16, 1939
- "Your Love Has Faded" (Columbia 35640) October 16, 1939

1940

- "Solitude" (Columbia 35427) February 14, 1940
- "Stormy Weather" (Columbia 35556) February 14, 1940
- "Mood Indigo" (Columbia 35427) February 14, 1940
- "So Far, So Good" (Victor 26537) March 6, 1940
- "Me and You" (Victor 26598) March 15, 1940
- "At a Dixie Roadside Diner" (Victor 26719) July 22, 1940
- "Five O'clock Whistle" (Victor 26748) September 15, 1940

1941

- "Chocolate Shake" (Victor 27531) June 26, 1941
- "I Got It Bad (and That Ain't Good)" (Victor 27531) June 26, 1941
- "Jump for Joy" (RCA Victor LPV-517) July 2, 1941
- "Rocks in My Bed" (Victor 27639) September 26, 1941

1942

- "I Don't Mind" (Victor 20-1598) February 26, 1942
- "Hayfoot, Strawfoot" (Victor 20-1505) July 28, 1942

1944

- "Mexico Joe (The Jumpin' Jivin' Caballero)" (as Ivie Anderson with Ceelle Burke's Orch) (Exclusive 101) February 1944
- "Play Me the Blues" (as Ivie Anderson with Ceelle Burke's Orch) (Exclusive 101) February 1944

1946

- "I Got It Bad (And That Ain't Good)" (as Ivie Anderson and Her All Stars) (Black & White 771) January 1946
- "On the Sunny Side of the Street" (as Ivie Anderson and Her All Stars) (Black & White 771) January 1946
- "I Thought You Ought to Know" (as Ivie Anderson and Her All Stars) (Black & White 772) January 1946
- "The Voot is Here to Stay" (as Ivie Anderson and Her All Stars) (Black & White 772) January 1946
- "He's Tall, Dark & Handsome" (as Ivie Anderson with Phil Moore Conducting) (Black & White 823) October 1946
- "Twice Too Many" (as Ivie Anderson with Phil Moore Conducting) (Black & White 823) October 1946
- "Big Butter and Egg Man" (as Ivie Anderson with Phil Moore Conducting) (Black & White 824) October 1946
- "Empty Bed Blues" (as Ivie Anderson with Phil Moore Conducting) (Black & White 824) October 1946

=== Compilations ===
- Duke Ellington Presents Ivie Anderson [1931–1940] (Columbia KG 32064) 1973 (2-LP)
- An Introduction to Ivie Anderson (Her Best Recordings 1932–1942) (Best Of Jazz 4020) 1995
- I Got It Good and That Ain't Bad! With the Duke & Beyond (Jasmine 2560) 1999
- It Don't Mean a Thing (Living Era/ASV 5420) 2002
- The Ivie Anderson Collection 1932–1946 (Acrobat 3267) 2018 (2-CD)

=== Appearances on Ellington recordings ===
- The Blanton–Webster Band [1940–1942] (RCA 5659-2-RB) 1990
- Ellington and His Great Vocalists (Columbia CK 66372) 1993

=== Charting singles ===
| Year | Single | Peak positions |
| Year | Single | US Country |
|---|---|---|
| 1944 | "Mexico Joe (The Jumpin' Jivin' Caballero)" | 4 |
