= Ceelle Burke =

Musician and performer

Cecil Louis Burke, who performed as Ceelle Burke, was an American musician and performer. He was born in Los Angeles. After working with the Norman Thomas Quintette, he joined Curtis Mosby's Blue Blowers. He collaborated with Leon Rene on the song Lovely Hannah. He recorded From Twilight 'Til Dawn with his orchestra on Capitol Records in 1943. Alan Warner and Billy Vera produced. Leon Rene wrote the song. He also played with Jackie Kelso.

Burke recorded several songs on Rene's label Exclusive Records.

== Songs ==
- "From Twilight 'Till Dawn" [mx#: AM02686] with 'The 3 Shades and the 4 Dreamers' (backing vocal group)
- "Lovely Hannah" [AM02689] with 'The 3 Shades and the 4 Dreamers' (backing vocal group)
- "Mexico Joe (The Jumpin' Jivin' Caballero)" [AM03113] with Ivie Anderson (lead vocalist)
- "Play Me the Blues" [AM03114] with Ivie Anderson (lead vocalist)
- "Your Make Believe Ballroom" [AM03115] with 'The Pied Pipers' (vocal group)
- "Now or Never" [AM03116]
- "When the Ships Come Sailing Home Again" [AM03117]
- "When the Swallows Come Back to Capistrano" [AM03118]
- "Night-Bird", words by Shirley Rey; with music by Rey and Burke
- "Whoo'ee Baby", words by Ella Burke
- "This is It", words by Ella Burke
