= Teddy Buckner =

American jazz trumpeter (1909–1994)

- Birth name: John Edward Buckner
- Also known as: Teddy Buckner
- Born: July 16, 1909; Sherman, Texas, U.S.
- Origin: United States
- Died: September 22, 1994 (aged 85); Los Angeles, California, U.S.
- Genres: Jazz, Dixieland, jump blues, swing
- Occupation(s): Musician, actor
- Instrument: Trumpet
- Years active: 1924–1981
- Formerly of: Lionel Hampton, Benny Carter Orchestra, T-Bone Walker, Kid Ory

Teddy Buckner (July 16, 1909 in Sherman, Texas – September 22, 1994 in Los Angeles, California) was an American jazz trumpeter associated with Dixieland music.

Early in his career, Buckner played with Sonny Clay. He worked with Buck Clayton in Shanghai in 1934, and later worked with Benny Carter among others. From 1949 to 1954, Buckner worked in Kid Ory's band, which was perhaps the closest to the style he preferred. In the late 1950s, his work with Sidney Bechet in France made him popular there but, before going to France, he recorded the soundtrack of the movie King Creole with Elvis Presley in 1958. From 1965 to 1981, he performed with his traditional Dixieland jazz band at Disneyland's New Orleans Square.

In addition to this, he worked with blues musician T-Bone Walker and did some acting. This included a credited role in the 1964 horror film Hush...Hush, Sweet Charlotte, and an uncredited role in They Shoot Horses, Don't They? (1969). He played cornet in a few of his film roles.
