= I'm No Angel =

1933 film by Wesley Ruggles

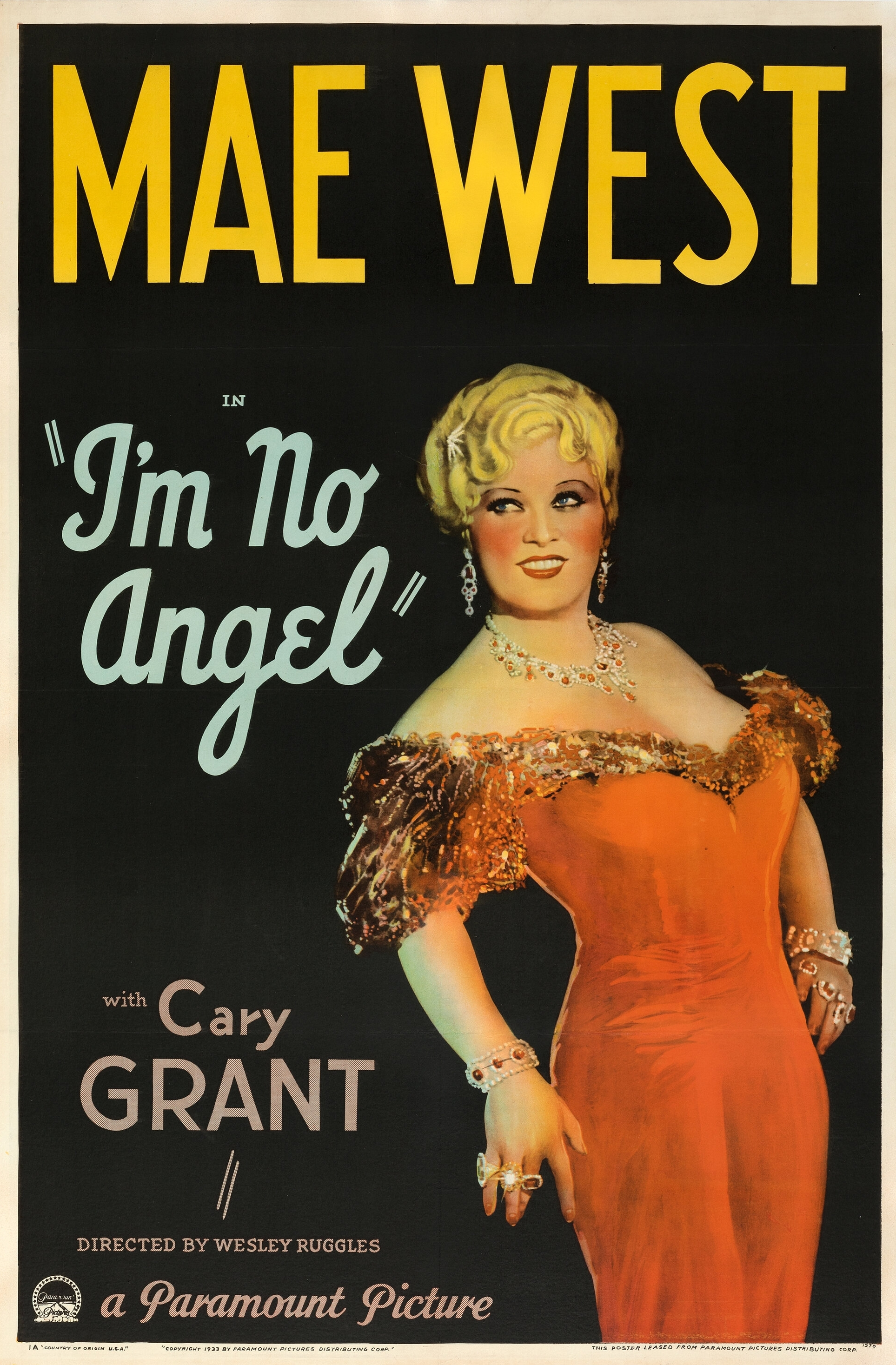
- Theatrical release poster
- Directed by: Wesley Ruggles
- Written by: Mae West (Note: Story, screenplay, and all dialogue); Lowell Brentano (Note: Suggestions); Harlan Thompson (Note: Continuity)
- Produced by: William LeBaron
- Starring: Mae West; Cary Grant
- Cinematography: Leo Tover
- Edited by: Otho Lovering
- Music by: Harvey Brooks
- Production company: Paramount Pictures
- Distributed by: Paramount Pictures
- Release dates: October 3, 1933 (Chicago); October 6, 1933 (United States)
- Running time: 87 minutes
- Country: United States
- Language: English
- Budget: $225,000 (estimated)
- Box office: $2,250,000 (rentals)

I'm No Angel is a 1933 American pre-Code semimusical romantic comedy film directed by Wesley Ruggles and starring Mae West and Cary Grant. West received sole story and screenplay credit. The film was one of her earliest few breakthrough-role appearances, and as such, was not subjected to the heavy censorship that dogged her screenplays after Hollywood began enforcing the Hays Code.

== Plot ==
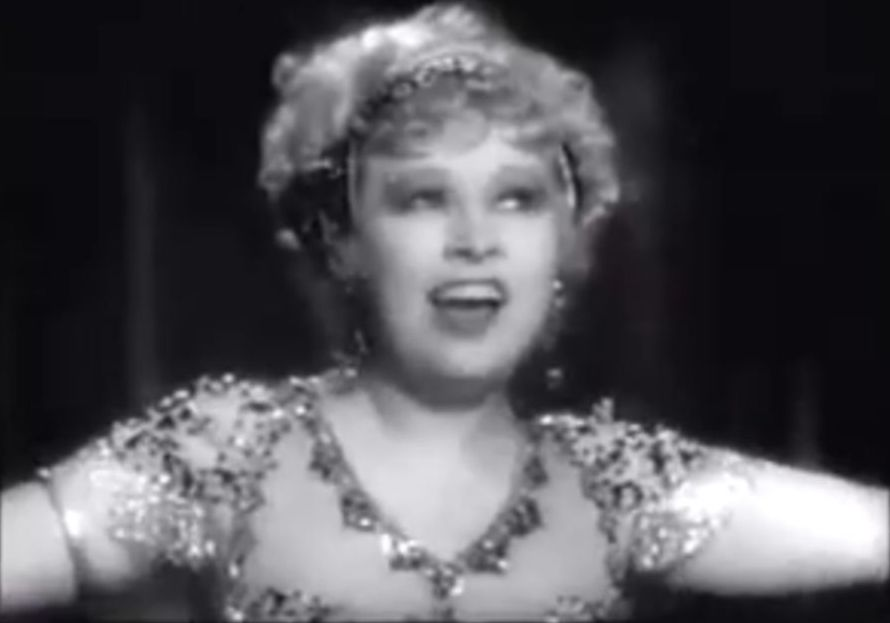
Mae West performing her burlesque dance in front of men, from the film's trailer

Tira works as a burlesque dancer and occasional lion tamer in the sideshow of Big Bill Barton's Wonder Show, while her current boyfriend, pickpocket "Slick" Wiley, relieves her distracted audience of their valuables for Big Bill. One of the rich customers, Ernest Brown, arranges a private rendezvous with Tira, during which Slick barges in and attempts to run a badger game on Ernest. When Ernest threatens to call the police, Slick whacks him over the head with a bottle. Mistakenly thinking he has killed Ernest, Slick flees, but he is later caught and jailed.

Fearing that Slick will implicate her, Tira asks Big Bill for a loan to retain her lawyer, Bennie Pinkowitz. He agrees on the condition that she agrees to put her head in a lion's mouth. The show is a success and the circus moves to New York City, where wealthy Kirk Lawrence becomes smitten with Tira, despite being engaged to snobbish socialite Alicia Hatton. He showers her with expensive gifts. Kirk's even richer friend and cousin, Jack Clayton, visits Tira to persuade her to leave Kirk and his fiancée alone. He ends up falling for her himself. Tira and Jack's romance leads to a wedding engagement.

Tira tells Big Bill she is quitting the show to get married. Unwilling to lose his prize act, he has Slick, recently released from prison, sneak into Tira's penthouse suite, where Jack finds him in his robe. As a result, Jack breaks off the engagement through a letter. Unaware of Slick's sabotage, Tira sues Jack for breach of promise. The defense tries to use her past relationships to discredit her, but the judge allows her to cross-examine the witnesses herself and in doing so, she wins over not only the judge and jury, but also Jack. Jack agrees to give her a big settlement check. When he goes to see her, Tira tears up the check, and the two reconcile.

== Cast ==
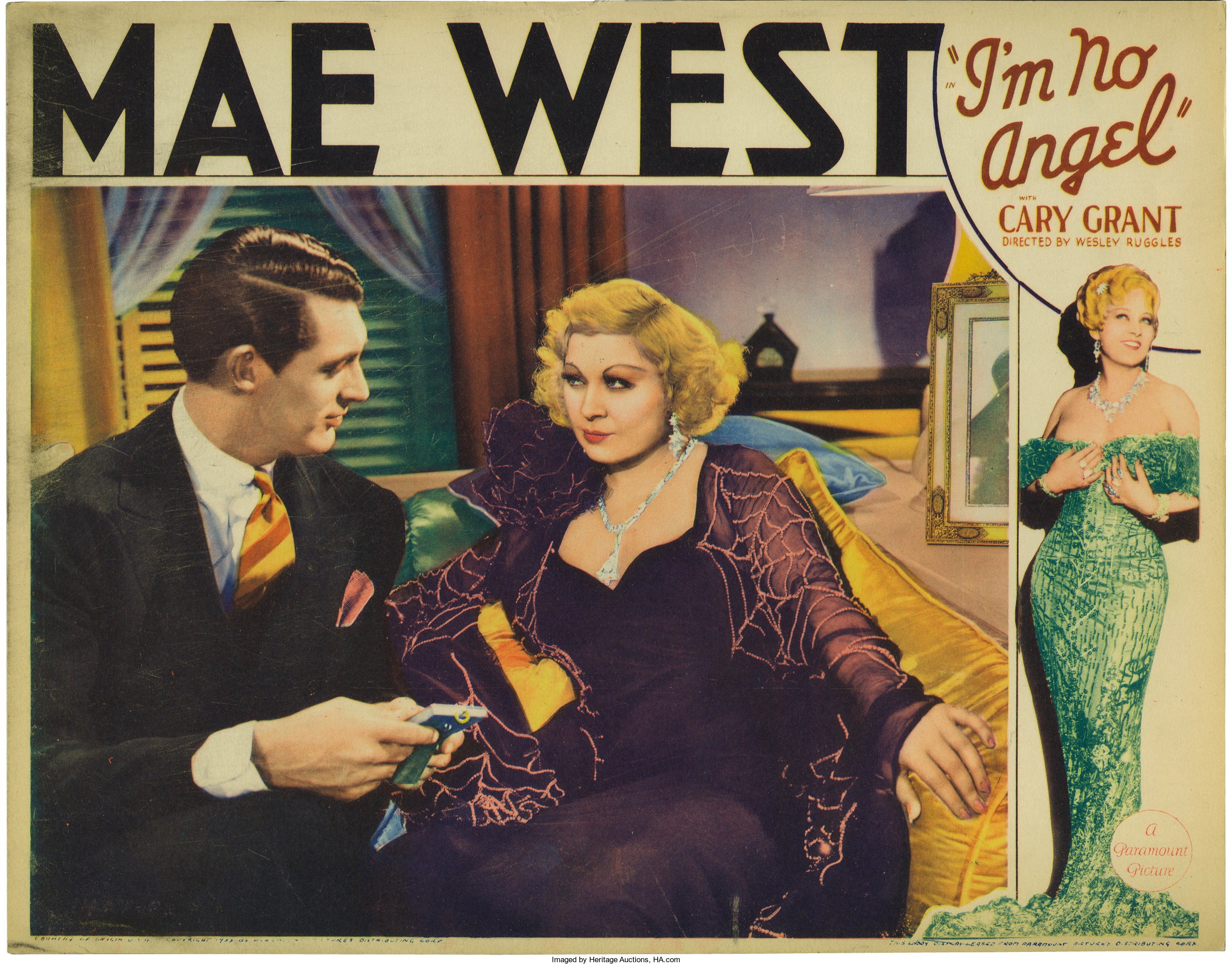
Lobby card for the film with Cary Grant and Mae West

- Mae West as Tira
- Cary Grant as Jack Clayton
- Gregory Ratoff as Benny Pinkowitz
- Edward Arnold as "Big Bill" Barton
- Ralf Harolde as "Slick" Wiley
- Kent Taylor as Kirk Lawrence
- Gertrude Michael as Alicia Hatton
- Russell Hopton as "Flea" Madigan
- Dorothy Peterson as Thelma
- William B. Davidson (credited as Wm. B. Davidson) as Ernest Brown
- Gertrude Howard as Beulah Thorndyke, Tira's main maid
- Libby Taylor as Libby, Tira's hairdressing maid
- Hattie McDaniel as Tira's manicurist (uncredited)
- Irving Pichel as Clayton's lawyer (uncredited)
- Walter Walker as the judge (uncredited)

== Context ==
I'm No Angel was released immediately after She Done Him Wrong, when Mae West was one of the nation's biggest box-office attractions and its most controversial star. In the early 1930s, West's films were an important factor in saving Paramount Pictures from bankruptcy. During the difficult times of the Great Depression, many filmgoers responded enthusiastically to West, especially to her portrayal of a woman "from the wrong side of the tracks" achieving success both economically and socially.

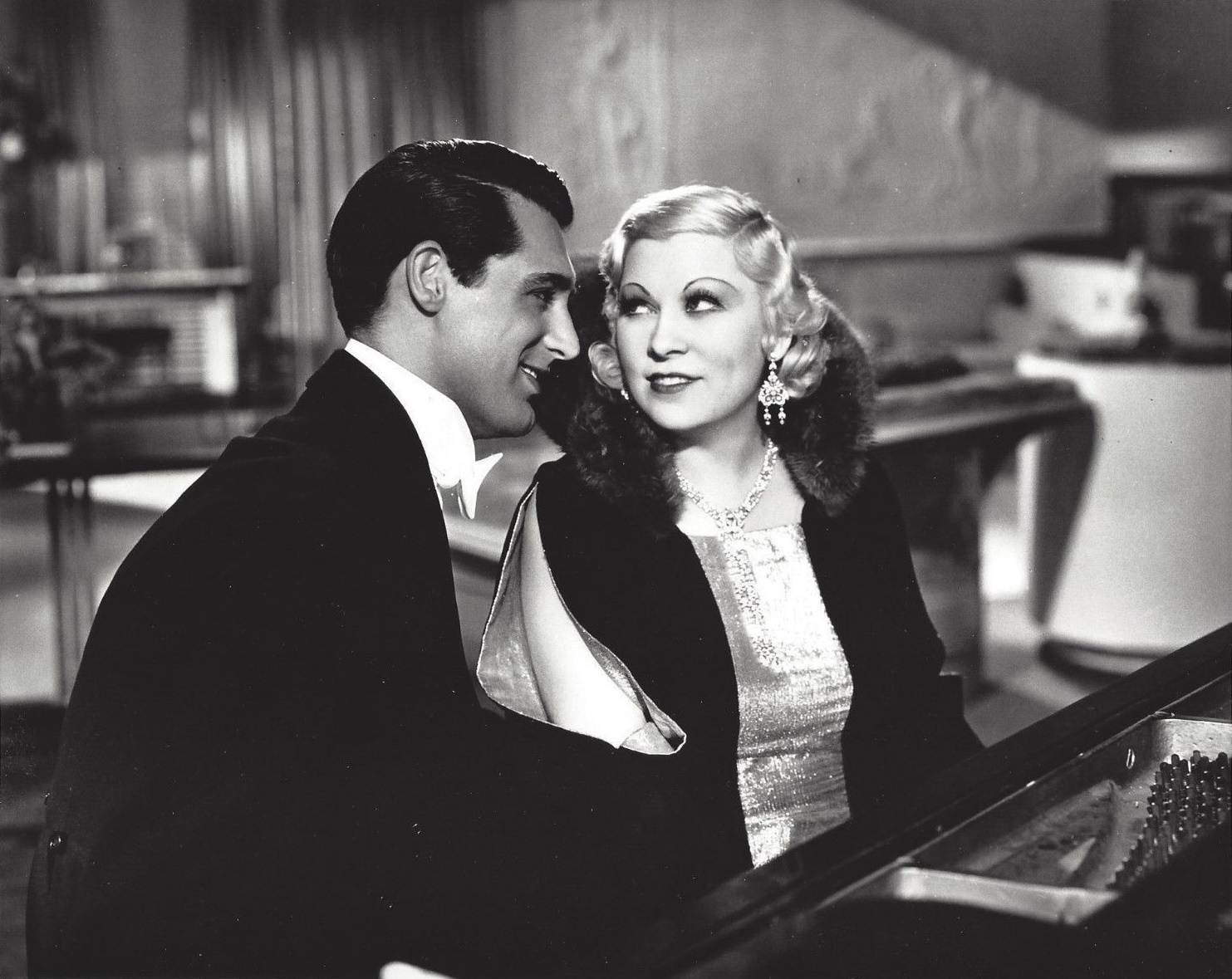
Grant with West in I'm No Angel, their second film together

Cary Grant starred opposite her for the second and final time; their first film together had been She Done Him Wrong. Grant remained annoyed for decades that West often took credit for his career despite the fact that he had made major films before. The smash hit Blonde Venus, starring Marlene Dietrich and Grant, antedates She Done Him Wrong by a year, though West always claimed to have discovered Grant for her film, amusingly elaborating that up until then he had only made "some tests with starlets." She would frequently claim to various reporters through the years that she had spotted him as an unknown walking across a parking lot, asked who he was, and finding that nobody knew, declared, "If he can talk, I'll use him in my next picture." This tale was routinely incorporated into magazine articles about either West or Grant.

West's ribald satire outraged moralists. Film historians cite her as one of the factors for the strict Hollywood production code that soon followed. The Hays Office forced a few changes, including the title of the song "No One Does It Like a Dallas Man", altered to "No One Loves Me Like a Dallas Man". David Niven claims, in an interview on Parkinson, that the Hays Office changed the title from "It Ain't No Sin".

== Soundtrack ==
- "They Call Me Sister Honky-Tonk" (1933) (uncredited)
  - Music by Harvey Oliver Brooks
  - Lyrics by Gladys DuBois and Ben Ellison
  - Sung by Mae West
- "That Dallas Man" (1933) (uncredited)
  - Music by Harvey Oliver Brooks
  - Lyrics by Gladys DuBois and Ben Ellison
  - Played on a record on which Mae West sings
- "I Found a New Way to Go to Town" (1933) (uncredited)
  - Music by Harvey Oliver Brooks
  - Lyrics by Gladys DuBois and Ben Ellison
  - Sung by Mae West
- "I Want You, I Need You" (1933) (uncredited)
  - Music by Harvey Oliver Brooks
  - Lyrics by Ben Ellison
  - Played on a piano and sung by Mae West
- "I'm No Angel" (1933) (uncredited)
  - Music by Harvey Oliver Brooks
  - Lyrics by Gladys DuBois and Ben Ellison
  - Sung by Mae West at the end and during the closing credits

== Reception ==
The film was Paramount's biggest hit of the year. It was also Franklin D. Roosevelt's favorite film.

=== Critical response ===
Pauline Kael wrote: "Mae West as a lion tamer, Cary Grant as a society lion, lots of adenoidal innuendo, and some good honky-tonk songs ('That Dallas Man', et al.). Arguably West's best film, certainly one of her funniest. When she isn't wiggling in her corsets and driving men wild, she's sashaying around and camping it up for her plump black maids (Gertrude Howard, Libby Taylor)." Leonard Maltin gave it three and a half of four stars: "West is in rare form as a star of Arnold's sideshow who chases after playboy Grant. Builds to a hilarious courtroom climax." Leslie Halliwell gave it three of four stars: "The star's most successful vehicle ... remains a highly diverting show with almost a laugh a minute. Released before the Legion of Decency was formed, it also contains some of Mae's fruitiest lines."

== See also ==
- National Recovery Administration, the logo displayed at start of film
