= Sonny Clay =

American jazz musician (1899–1973)

- Born: William Rogers Campbell Clay; May 15, 1899; Chapel Hill, Texas, U.S.
- Died: April 10, 1973 Los Angeles, California, U.S.
- Genre: Jazz
- Occupations: Musician; bandleader
- Instruments: piano; drums
- Years active: 1921-1941
- Formerly of: Charlie Green; Jelly Roll Morton

William Rogers Campbell "Sonny" Clay (May 15, 1899, Chapel Hill, Texas – April 13, 1973, Los Angeles, California) was an American jazz pianist, drummer, and bandleader, who had an unusual impact on the development of Australian jazz.

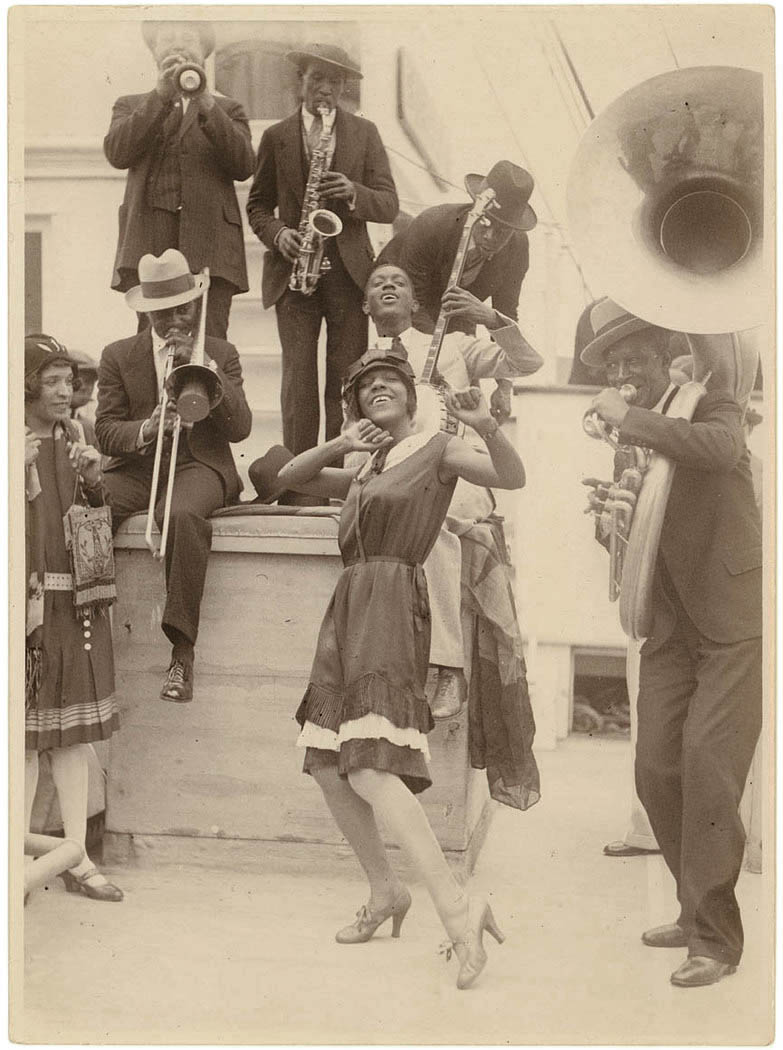
Sonny Clay Band, Australia, 1928

== Biography ==
Clay's family moved to Phoenix when he was eight years old. He played drums and xylophone early in life. From 1915 he studied piano, playing with Charlie Green and Jelly Roll Morton in Mexico around 1920. He drummed for Reb Spikes in California in 1921, and had his first recording experience backing Camille Allen in 1922. Later that year he played with Kid Ory at the Hiawatha Dancing Academy in Los Angeles.

In 1923 he formed his own band, the Eccentric Harmony Six. This ensemble recorded on Vocalion Records as the California Poppies in 1923 and the Stompin' Six in 1925. He also performed under the band names Plantation Orchestra and Hartford Ballroom Orchestra. His band scored a regular gig broadcasting on radio stations KNX in 1925 and KFI in 1926.

In 1928 Clay took his band (billed as Sonny Clay's Colored Idea) on a tour of Australia, with Ivie Anderson (later a vocalist with Duke Ellington) as one of the singers accompanying the orchestra. The group played in Sydney and Melbourne to great success, but problems with unions and with venue changes (their initial bookings were on vaudeville stages, but additional dates in dance halls led them into race-related trouble with local authorities) resulted in their gaining some notoriety. As rumors of drug use and miscegenation between the black band members and white women flew, the group was subject to a police raid which became a national press sensation. As a result, Clay and his band were deported and the Australian government resolved to bar the entry of all black musicians into the country, a ban which kept Louis Armstrong from touring the country until 1954.

Upon Clay's return, he held a residency at the Vernon County Club in Los Angeles, then broke up this band and formed a new one called the Dixie Serenaders, which counted Teddy Buckner and Les Hite among its members. Clay played solo and led bands until 1941, at which time he led a band as a member of the Special Services Division. He retired from music in the 1940s but returned around 1960 to record solo and play in clubs.

== Additional references ==
- Sonny Clay at Allmusic
- Howard Rye, "Sonny Clay". Grove Jazz online.
- Andrew Bissett, Black Roots, White Flowers: A History of Australian Jazz (ABC Books, 1979)
