= Paul Howard (musician) =

American jazz saxophonist and clarinetist (1895–1980)

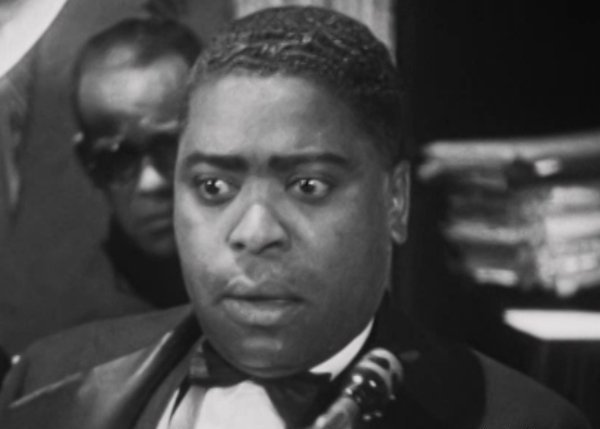
Image of Paul Howard

Paul Leroy "Ox Blood" Howard (September 20, 1895 – February 18, 1980) was an American jazz saxophonist and clarinetist.

== Early life ==
Howard was born in Steubenville, Ohio southeast of Akron on September 20, 1895. He began playing cornet and also played oboe, bassoon, flute, and piano, but concentrated on being a tenor sax player.

== Later life and career ==
After moving to Los Angeles in 1911, he gained early professional experience with Wood Wilson's Syncopators in 1916, Satchel McVea's Howdy Band, and Harry Southard's Black and Tan Band. Howard played in the bands of both King Oliver and Jelly Roll Morton during their tours of California. He first recorded with the Quality Four in 1922-23, then played with Sonny Clay in 1925 before forming his own group, the Quality Serenaders, later that year. Among his sidemen were Lionel Hampton and Lawrence Brown (trombone). They played at Sebastian's Cotton Club in Culver City, California from 1927 to 1929 and recorded for Victor Records before disbanding in 1930, when Les Hite picked up some of the members. Howard then played with Ed Garland, Freddie Washington, Hampton again in 1935, Eddie Barefield (1936–37), Charlie Echols, and his own ensembles including one which held a residence at Virginia's in Los Angeles from 1939 to 1953. He played throughout the 1950s. He died in Los Angeles on February 18, 1980.

== Recording sessions ==
Howard's band participated in only six recording sessions:

Date	Location	Recordings
April 16, 1929	Hollywood	50830-1-2 — "Overnight Blues" (Victor rejected); 50831-1-2-3 — "Quality Shout" (Victor rejected)
April 28, 1929	Culver City	50868-1 — "The Ramble" (Victor V-38068; Bluebird B-5804); 50869-2 — "Moonlight Blues" (Victor V-38068); 50870-2 — "Charlie's Idea" (Victor V-38070; Victor 22001)
April 29, 1929	Culver City	50830-4 — "Overnight Blues" (Victor V-38070; Victor 22001); 50831-5 — "Quality Shout" (Victor V-38122); 50877-1 — "Stuff" (Victor V-38122; Bluebird B-5804)
October 21, 1929	Culver City	54477-1-2 — "Harlem" (Victor rejected); 54478-1-2 — "Cuttin' Up" (Victor rejected)
February 3, 1930	Culver City	54477-3 — "Harlem" (Victor 23354); 54478-3 — "Cuttin' Up" (Victor 23420); 54585-1 — "New Kinda Blues" (Victor 22660); 54586-2 — "California Swing" (Victor 23354)
June 25, 1930	Hollywood	54847-3 — "Burma Girl" (Victor rejected; released on Victor LPM-10117 LP); 54848-1 — "Gettin' Ready Blues" (Victor 23420)
