= Les Hite =

American jazz bandleader (1903–1962)

Les Hite (February 13, 1903 – February 6, 1962) was an American jazz bandleader.

== Life and career ==
Born in DuQuoin, Illinois, United States, Hite attended the University of Illinois and played saxophone with family members in a band in the 1920s. Following this, he played with Detroit Shannon and then the Helen Dewey Show, but when this group disbanded abruptly, Hite relocated to Los Angeles. There he played with The Spikes Brothers Orchestra, Mutt Carey, Curtis Mosby, and Paul Howard. He became leader of Howard's band in 1930, and played at the Cotton Club in Los Angeles for several years, accompanying Louis Armstrong and Fats Waller among others. They also recorded frequently for film soundtracks and occasionally appeared on camera.

Hite's big band, known as Sebastian's Cotton Club Orchestra, primarily played in Los Angeles, though they occasionally went on tour. Musicians who played in the band include Lionel Hampton, Marshal Royal, George Orendorff, Lawrence Brown, Britt Woodman, Joe Wilder, T-Bone Walker, Marvin Johnson, and Dizzy Gillespie. Les Hites Syncopators were featured for the opening day ceremony of a "colored country club" called the Appomattox, owned by Leon Hefflin Sr. on Labor Day, September 1, 1930. Hite rarely recorded, and for this reason much of the details of his life and work are poorly documented. The only sessions he did were 14 numbers recorded between 1940 and 1942.

Hite died at St. John's Hospital in Santa Monica, California, a week before his 59th birthday, reportedly following a heart attack.
