= Harry James discography =

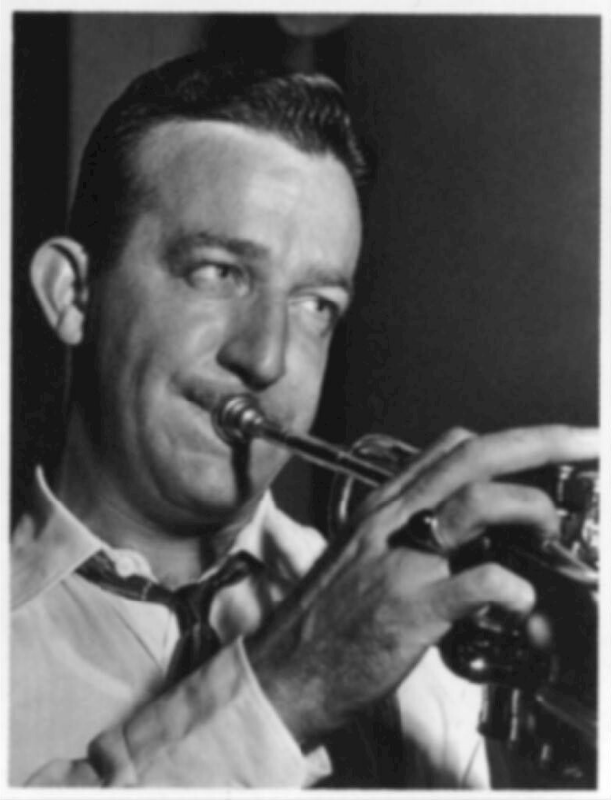
- James in New York, August 1946
- Studio albums: 30
- EPs: 47
- Soundtrack albums: 3
- Live albums: 62
- Compilation albums: 30
- Singles: 220

The discography of American trumpeter and band leader Harry James includes 30 studio albums, 47 EPs, three soundtrack/stage and screen albums, and numerous live albums and compilation albums, along with contributions as sideman and appearances with other musicians. James released over 200 singles during his career, with nine songs reaching number one, 32 in the top ten, and 70 in the top 100 on the U.S. pop charts, as well as seven charting on the U.S. R&B chart. (Note: At the time of James's chartings, Billboard magazine referred to the R&B chart as "The Harlem Hit Parade".) As of 2016, two recordings of Harry James had been inducted into the Grammy Hall of Fame, a special Grammy Award established in 1973 to honor recordings that are at least 25 years old, and that have "qualitative or historical significance".

The list includes releases attributed to Harry James and His Orchestra, Harry James and His Big Band, Harry James and the Boogie Woogie Trio, Frank Sinatra and Harry James, James and Forrest, Kitty Kallen with Harry James, Rosemary Clooney and Harry James, Harry James and His Orchestra and Doris Day, Harry James with Rhythm, Harry James and His Music Makers, Harry James and His Western Friends, Harry James and Toni Harper, The Harry James Octet, Harry James and His New Jazz Band, Harry James and the Quintet, Members of the Harry James Orchestra, or simply Harry James. As of the initial release on Wikipedia, this discography only includes vinyl/shellac releases in the United States.

== As leader ==
=== Albums and album box sets ===
==== Studio albums ====
Label	Title	Year	Catalog #	Track List
Columbia	Your Dance Date with Harry James and His Orchestra	1950	CL 6138 (10-inch LP)	Sweet Jenny Lou, These Foolish Things, New Two O'Clock Jump, Big John's Special, Deep Purple, Squaty Roo, In a Mist*; *In A Mist was originally included on CL 6138 but was removed from the LP immediately after its initial release.
Columbia	Soft Lights, Sweet Trumpet	1952	CL 6207 (10-inch LP)	Serenade in Blue, Manhattan, September in the Rain, You Go to My Head, That Old Feeling, If I'm Lucky, Just a Gigolo, Embraceable You
Columbia	Soft Lights, Sweet Trumpet	1954	CL 581	Serenade in Blue, Manhattan, September in the Rain, You Go to My Head, Autumn Serenade, Lovelight, That Old Feeling, If I'm Lucky, Just a Gigolo, Embraceable You, Moonglow, When the Sun Comes Out
Columbia	Hollywood's Best (Rosemary Clooney and Harry James) (Note: For the songs on Columbia's Hollywood's Best, 78discography.com also shows 78/45 rpm releases of these songs on catalog numbers 39852, 39853, 39854, and 39855; however, Manfred Thönicke’s Collector’s Guide to the Works of Ray Connif indicates these releases were cancelled.)	1952	CL 6224 (10-inch LP)	You'll Never Know, "On the Atchison, Topeka and the Santa Fe", It Might as Well Be Spring, Over the Rainbow, Sweet Leilani, The Continental, When You Wish Upon a Star, "In the Cool, Cool, Cool of the Evening"
Columbia	Hollywood's Best (Rosemary Clooney and Harry James)	1954	CL 585	You'll Never Know, "On the Atchison, Topeka and the Santa Fe", Ruby, It Might as Well Be Spring, Come on-A My House, Over the Rainbow, Sweet Leilani, The Continental, Stella By Starlight, When You Wish Upon a Star, Red Garters, "In the Cool, Cool, Cool of the Evening"
Columbia	Trumpet After Midnight	1954	CL 553	Autumn Leaves, Judy, The Moon of Manakoora, How Deep Is the Ocean (How High Is the Sky), Symphony, Moanin' Low, If I Loved You, I Had the Craziest Dream, Theme for Cynthia, Lush Life, "Bess, You Is My Woman", I Never Knew (I Could Love Anybody Like I'm Loving You)
Columbia	Juke Box Jamboree	1955	CL 615	Little Things Mean a Lot, Hernando's Hideaway, Three Coins in the Fountain, The High and the Mighty, The Touch, "O, Mein Papa", Ruby, Serenata, Smile, I Need You Now, Oop Shoop, Muskrat Ramble
Columbia	Jazz Session	1955	CL 669	Anything, One for My Baby (And One More for the Road), Marchin', Tenderly, Moonlight Fiesta, (Get Your Kicks on) Route 66!, I'll Remember April, Concerto for Clarinet, Bali Hai, Stealin' Apples, Perdido, Queen of the Mambo
Capitol	Harry James in Hi-Fi (Note: After moving to Capitol Records, James recorded new studio versions of many of his previously released songs from Columbia on Capitol's Harry James in Hi-Fi and More Harry James in Hi-Fi.)	1955	W 654	Ciribiribin, Trumpet Blues, You Made Me Love You (I Didn't Want to Do It), James Session, I've Heard That Song Before, Cherry, I'm Beginning to See the Light, My Silent Love, Sleepy Lagoon, Two O'Clock Jump, I Cried For You (Now It's Your Turn To Cry Over Me), Jalousie, "It's Been a Long, Long Time", Velvet Moon, Music Makers, Ciribiribin
Capitol	More Harry James in Hi-Fi	1956	W 712	The Mole, Autumn Serenade, Sleepy Time Gal, Crazy Rhythm, Melancholy Rhapsody, September Song, Carnival, Strictly Instrumental, Blue Again, Don Cha Go Way Mad, These Foolish Things, Somebody Loves Me, Street Scenes
Capitol	Wild About Harry!	1957	T 874	Kinda Like the Blues, Blues for Lovers Only, Countin', Cotton Pickin', Ring for Porter, Barn 12, What Am I Here For, Blues for Harry's Sake, Bee Gee, Blues on a Count
Capitol	Wild About Harry!	1957	ST 874	Kinda Like the Blues, Blues for Lovers Only, Countin', Cotton Pickin', Ring for Porter, Barn 12, What Am I Here For, Blues for Harry's Sake, Bee Gee, Blues on a Count
Capitol	The New James	1958	T 1037	Fair and Warmer, J. Walkin', One on the House, Just Lucky, Bangtail, Warm Blue Stream, Here's One, Bells, Walkin' on Air
Capitol	The New James	1958	ST 1037	Fair and Warmer, J. Walkin', One on the House, Just Lucky, Bangtail, Warm Blue Stream, Here's One, Bells, Walkin' on Air
Capitol	Harry's Choice!	1958	T 1093	You're My Thrill, Willow Weep for Me, Blues for Sale, I Want a Little Girl, Moten Swing, (Do You Know What It Means to Miss) New Orleans, Just for Fun, The New Two O'Clock Jump
Capitol	Harry's Choice!	1958	ST 1093	You're My Thrill, Willow Weep for Me, Blues for Sale, I Want a Little Girl, Moten Swing, (Do You Know What It Means to Miss) New Orleans, Just for Fun, The New Two O'Clock Jump
MGM	Harry James and His New Swingin' Band	1959	E 3778	Shiny Stockings, How Deep Is the Ocean, Slats, Blues Like, Cotton Tail, Too Close for Comfort (From "Mr. Wonderful"), Kingsize Blues, M-Squad Theme, Deep Purple, Walkin', Get Off the Stand
MGM	Harry James and His New Swingin' Band	1959	SE 3778	Shiny Stockings, How Deep Is the Ocean, Slats, Blues Like, Cotton Tail, Too Close for Comfort (From "Mr. Wonderful"), Kingsize Blues, M-Squad Theme, Deep Purple, Walkin', Get Off the Stand
MGM	Harry James...Today!	1960	E 3848	Undecided, Satin Doll, Eyes, End of Town Blues, King Porter Stomp, Ensemble, Jersey Bounce, Rockin' in Rhythm, Take the "A" Train, Lester Leaps In
MGM	Harry James...Today!	1960	SE 3848	Undecided, Satin Doll, Eyes, End of Town Blues, King Porter Stomp, Ensemble, Jersey Bounce, Rockin' in Rhythm, Take the "A" Train, Lester Leaps In
MGM	The Spectacular Sound of Harry James	1961	E 3897	Man with the Blues, What a Woman Feels, Swingin' Together, New Life, Three's a Crowd, The Jazz Connoisseur, Harry's Delight, Sweets' Tooth, Lover Man (Oh, Where Can You Be?), Connectin' the Bones
MGM	The Spectacular Sound of Harry James	1961	SE 3897	Man with the Blues, What a Woman Feels, Swingin' Together, New Life, Three's a Crowd, The Jazz Connoisseur, Harry's Delight, Sweets' Tooth, Lover Man (Oh, Where Can You Be?), Connectin' the Bones
MGM	Harry James Plays Neal Hefti	1961	E 3972	Tweet Tweet, Chiarina, "Harry, Not Jesse", The Creeper, Mister Johnson, Hot Pink, Sunday Morning, Koo Koo, Rainbow Kiss, Fontainebleau (Sans Souci)
MGM	Harry James Plays Neal Hefti	1961	SE 3972	Tweet Tweet, Chiarina, "Harry, Not Jesse", The Creeper, Mister Johnson, Hot Pink, Sunday Morning, Koo Koo, Rainbow Kiss, Fontainebleau (Sans Souci)
MGM	The Solid Gold Trumpet of Harry James	1962	E 4058	Opener, Serenade in Blue, Jones Beach, I'm in the Market for You, Lush Life, Opus No. 1, Autumn Leaves, a Swinging Serenade, I'm Confessin' (That I Love You), The Mole
MGM	The Solid Gold Trumpet of Harry James	1962	SE 4058	Opener, Serenade in Blue, Jones Beach, I'm in the Market for You, Lush Life, Opus No. 1, Autumn Leaves, a Swinging Serenade, I'm Confessin' (That I Love You), The Mole
MGM	The Solid Gold Trumpet of Harry James	1962	PM 8	Same tracks as E/SE 4058 plus Marquee and Cabaret
MGM	The Solid Gold Trumpet of Harry James	1962	SLM 4058	Opus No. 1, Autumn Leaves, I'm in the Market for You, The Mole, I'm Confessin', Serenade in Blue
MGM	Double Dixie!	1963	E 4137	My Monday Date, The James Boys, Cornet Chop Suey, The Truth, Weatherbird, Squeeze Me, Two Deuces, "I'm Coming, Virginia", My Inspiration
MGM	Double Dixie!	1963	SE 4137	My Monday Date, The James Boys, Cornet Chop Suey, The Truth, Weatherbird, Squeeze Me, Two Deuces, "I'm Coming, Virginia", My Inspiration
MGM	Double Dixie!	1963	SLM 4137	The Truth, My Inspiration, Cornet Chop Suey, My Monday Date, Squeeze Me, Weather Bird
MGM	New Versions of Down Beat Favorites	1964	E 4265	Sentimental Journey, Cherokee, If I Could Be with You, King Porter Stomp, Harlem Nocturne, Flying Home, In the Mood, Sophisticated Lady, String of Pearls, Frenesi, Tuxedo Junction, One O'Clock Jump
MGM	New Versions of Down Beat Favorites	1964	SE 4265	Sentimental Journey, Cherokee, If I Could Be with You, King Porter Stomp, Harlem Nocturne, Flying Home, In the Mood, Sophisticated Lady, String of Pearls, Frenesi, Tuxedo Junction, One O'Clock Jump
MGM	In a Relaxed Mood	1965	E 4274	I Surrender Dear, Spring Will Hang You Up, My Funny Valentine, For All We Know, I Cover the Waterfront, Rockin' Chair, That's All, Lazy River, Don't Blame Me, Time on My Hands
MGM	In a Relaxed Mood	1965	SE 4274	I Surrender Dear, Spring Will Hang You Up, My Funny Valentine, For All We Know, I Cover the Waterfront, Rockin' Chair, That's All, Lazy River, Don't Blame Me, Time on My Hands
Dot	Harry James Plays Green Onions & Other Great Hits	1965	DLP 3634	"Green Onions, Part 1 & Part 2", Red Roses for a Blue Lady, A Walk on the Wild Side, Three O'Clock in the Morning, Night Train, Love Theme from "In Harm's Way", The Lonely Bull, Down by the Old Mill Stream, Goldfinger, "Sunday Morning, Part 1 & Part 2"
Dot	Harry James Plays Green Onions & Other Great Hits	1965	DLP 25634	"Green Onions, Part 1 & Part 2", Red Roses for a Blue Lady, A Walk on the Wild Side, Three O'Clock in the Morning, Night Train, Love Theme from "In Harm's Way", The Lonely Bull, Down by the Old Mill Stream, Goldfinger, "Sunday Morning, Part 1 & Part 2"
Dot	The Ballads and the Beat!	1966	DLP 3669	Malaguena Salerosa, Goin' Out of My Head, The 'In' Crowd, Trumpet Toast, Cubano Chant, I Never Knew, "I Can Dream, Can't I?", Girl Talk, Andalucia, Willow Weep for Me
Dot	The Ballads and the Beat!	1966	DLP 25669	Malaguena Salerosa, Goin' Out of My Head, The 'In' Crowd, Trumpet Toast, Cubano Chant, I Never Knew, "I Can Dream, Can't I?", Girl Talk, Andalucia, Willow Weep for Me
Dot	Harry James & His Western Friends - San Antonio Rose	1966	DLP 3735	Blues Stay Away from Me, I Love You Because, Make the World Go Away, Mexicali Rose, Vaya Con Dios, San Antonio Rose, Cimarron, He'll Have to Go, I Can't Help It, Tumbling Tumbleweeds, Streets of Laredo, Faded Love
Dot	Harry James & His Western Friends - San Antonio Rose	1966	DLP 25735	Blues Stay Away from Me, I Love You Because, Make the World Go Away, Mexicali Rose, Vaya Con Dios, San Antonio Rose, Cimarron, He'll Have to Go, I Can't Help It, Tumbling Tumbleweeds, Streets of Laredo, Faded Love
Dot	Our Leader!	1967	DLP 3801	On a Clear Day You Can See Forever, Happy, It Was a Very Good Year, Trav'lin' Light (v. Ernie Andrews), Don't Stop Now, Lightly and Politely, "Sunrise, Sunset", Funny How Time Slips Away (v. Ernie Andrews), That's Thad
Dot	Our Leader!	1967	DLP 25801	On a Clear Day You Can See Forever, Happy, It Was a Very Good Year, Trav'lin' Light (v. Ernie Andrews), Don't Stop Now, Lightly and Politely, "Sunrise, Sunset", Funny How Time Slips Away (v. Ernie Andrews), That's Thad
London	The Golden Trumpet of Harry James (Note: James recorded new studio versions of previously released songs on London's The Golden Trumpet of Harry James in what the liner notes call "Phase 4 Stereo.")	1968	SP 44109	Ciribiribin, You Made Me Love You, Two O'clock Jump, I've Heard That Song Before, Ultra, By the Sleepy Lagoon, All or Nothing At All, Cherry, Take the "A" Train, I Heard You Cried Last Night, The Mole, Satin Doll, Ciribiribin
Longines Symphonette Society	Mr. Trumpet (Harry James Salutes the Great Trumpet Men of Our Times)	1972	SYS 5459/ LS 217C/ LS 217U	The Sheik of Araby, And the Angels Sing, Sweet's Fun, More Than You Know, Jazz Me Blues, Hot Lips, When It's Sleepy Time Down South, Don't Be That Way, Indiana, When the Saints Go Marching In
Sheffield Lab (Note: The Sheffield Lab recordings are direct-to-disc, meaning the recording process bypasses the use of magnetic tape and records the audio directly onto the analog disc masters.)	The King James Version	1976	LAB 3	Corner Pocket, Lara's Theme (From "Dr. Zhivago"), Cherokee, "More Splutie, Please", Traces, Don't Be That Way, Sweet Georgia Brown, Shiny Silk Stockings, Blues Stay Away from Me
Sheffield Lab	Comin' from a Good Place	1977	LAB 6	The Footstomper, You'll Never Know, Moten Swing, Two O'Clock Jump, Watch What Happens, Tuxedo Junction, Opus Number One, Make the World Go Away, Blues for Sale
Sheffield Lab	Still Harry After All These Years	1979	LAB 11	Caravan, Satin Doll, Roll 'Em, Sanford and Son, Moonglow / Theme from Picnic, Take the "A" Train, Undecided, Ciao, Dance, Help Me Make It Through the Night
Reader's Digest (Note: From 1969 to 1971, James recorded for Reader's Digest new studio versions of his previously released songs.)	For Listening and Dancing	1981	RD4A 213 (5x LP)	Music Makers, I Don't Want to Walk Without You (v. Helen Forrest), Around the World, It Must Be Him (v. Helen Forrest), A Taste of Honey, More (v. Helen Forrest), Back Beat Boogie, Gigi, I'm Beginning to See the Light (v. Helen Forrest), Red Wing, Three Coins in the Fountain, I've Heard That Song Before (v. Helen Forrest), Any Time, A Man and a Woman, King Porter Stomp, Sleepy Lagoon, This Guy's in Love with You, Call Me Irresponsible (v. Helen Forrest), Fly Me to the Moon (In Other Words), Poor Butterfly, Blue Skies, As Long as He Needs Me (v. Helen Forrest), By the Time I Get to Phoenix, My Melancholy Baby, Don't Be That Way, You Made Me Love You, Traces, You Go to My Head, Cherry, Opus One, I Had the Craziest Dream (v. Helen Forrest), My Heart Cries for You, Penny Serenade, Pennies from Heaven, Time After Time, You'll Never Know, One O'Clock Jump, Two O'Clock Jump, I'll Be Seeing You, Ciribiribin, "I Can Dream, Can't I?", Willow Weep for Me, San Antonio Rose, Michelle, Trumpet Blues, The Shadow of Your Smile (Love Theme from The Sandpiper), The Mole, I Cried for You (v. Helen Forrest), Night Train, Three O'Clock in the Morning

==== Live albums ====
Label	Title	Year	Catalog #	Track List
Columbia	One Night Stand (Aragon Ballroom, Chicago, 1952)	1953	GL 522	Ultra, Blues from "An American in Paris", Mam Bongo, Memphis Blues, The Flight of the Bumble Bee, There They Go, Jackpot Blues, You Go to My Head, Don't Stop, Feet Draggin' Blues, Back Beat Boogie
Columbia	One Night Stand (Aragon Ballroom, Chicago, 1952)	1953	CL 522	Ultra, Blues from "An American in Paris", Mam Bongo, Memphis Blues, The Flight of the Bumble Bee, There They Go, Jackpot Blues, You Go to My Head, Don't Stop, Feet Draggin' Blues, Back Beat Boogie
Columbia	Dancing in Person with Harry James at The Hollywood Palladium (Jan 22–23, 1954)	1954	CL 562	Palladium Party, Bye Bye Blues, "Please Take a Letter, Miss Brown", Ain't She Sweet (v. Buddy Rich), Sugar Foot Stomp, How Could You Do a Thing Like That to Me, Moonlight Bay, Midnight Sun, Moanin' Low, Flash
MGM	Requests On-The-Road	1962	E 4003	Ciribiribin, Sleepy Lagoon, Strictly Instrumental, If I'm Lucky, Moanin' Low, Ultra, You Made Me Love You, Crazy Rhythm, Velvet Moon, Cherry, Sleepy Time Gal, Back Beat Boogie
MGM	Requests On-The-Road	1962	SE 4003	Ciribiribin, Sleepy Lagoon, Strictly Instrumental, If I'm Lucky, Moanin' Low, Ultra, You Made Me Love You, Crazy Rhythm, Velvet Moon, Cherry, Sleepy Time Gal, Back Beat Boogie
Dot	Live at The Riverboat (Empire State Building, New York City, May 1966)	1966	DLP 3728	Ciribiribin, Michelle, A Taste of Honey, "Gee Baby, Ain't I Good to You", Apples, Do the Walk (Temptation Walk), The Shadow of Your Smile, Don't Be That Way, Roll 'Em Pete, Batman, Ciribiribin
Dot	Live at The Riverboat (Empire State Building, New York City, May 1966)	1966	DLP 25728	Ciribiribin, Michelle, A Taste of Honey, "Gee Baby, Ain't I Good to You", Apples, Do the Walk (Temptation Walk), The Shadow of Your Smile, Don't Be That Way, Roll 'Em Pete, Batman, Ciribiribin
Big Band Landmarks	Harry James and His Orchestra 1948–49	1969	Volumes X-XI (2x LP)	There They Go, "'Cept February, Which Has 28", You Turned the Tables on Me, Snooty Fruity, Things Ain't What They Used to Be, Lover, Or Words to That Effect, Big Boy, The Arrival, Raffles, "Six, Two and Even", Bells, Shine, Block Party, Forgotten, Cottontail, I May Be Wrong, Proclamation, Slap Happy, Kerina, Bluebeard's Blues, Rank Frank
Sunbeam	1940-41 (from The South Cafe, Boston 3/19/1940 and The Blue Room, Hotel Lincoln, New York 5/22/1941)	1973	SB 203	Ciribiribin, Tuxedo Junction, How High the Moon (v. Dick Haymes), Cherokee, Carnival of Venice, Girl of My Dreams, It's a Wonderful World (v. Jack Palmer), Relaxin', Tabu, Cherry, Number Ten Lullaby Lane (v. Dick Haymes), Andalucia (The Breeze and I), For Want of a Star (v. Dick Haymes), Jeffrie's Blues
Joyce	One Night Stand with Harry James (1946, 1953)	1975	LP 1014	Jump Sauce, I Can't Begin to Tell You, It's the Talk of the Town, Who's Sorry Now, I Should Care, Temptation, I'm in Love with Two Sweethearts, All of Me, Don't Be That Way, 'Til I Waltz Again with You, Palladium Party, Two O'Clock Jump
Joyce	One Night Stand with Harry James Vol. II (1939-1944)	1975	LP 1024	Vol Vistu Gaily Star, All or Nothing At All, I Found a New Baby, Ciribiribin, One Dozen Roses, Manhattan Serenade, Prince Charming, Velvet Moon, It Must Be Jelly, Come Out Wherever You Are, I've Got a Crush on You, St. Louis Blues, How Blue the Night, Blue Skies
Joyce	Radio Discs of Harry James (featuring Buddy Rich on Drums)	1975	LP 2002	Sugarfoot Stomp, Lullaby of Broadway (v. Paula Gilbert), Symphony, "Six, Two and Even", Judy, That Old Black Magic (v. Paula Gilbert), Except February Which Has 28, Flash, Embraceable You (v. Paula Gilbert), Autumn Leaves, In the Still of the Night (v. Paula Gilbert), Caxton Hall Swing, How Deep Is the Ocean?, Easy
Joyce	One Night Stand with Harry James in 1944	1976	LP 1034	Jiggers, Wrap Your Troubles in Dreams, It Could Happen to You, It Had to Be You, I'll Get By, Cherry, Take It Easy, Two O'Clock Jump, Jump Town, Peg o' My Heart, This Must Be Love, I'll Walk Alone, Poinciana, Back Beat Boogie
Joyce	Radio Discs of Harry James Volume 2 (1941-1944)	1976	LP 2010	Oh What a Beautiful Morning (v. Buddy Moreno), The Sad Sack, Sierra, "Better Give Me Lots of Lovin', Honey" (v. Buddy Moreno), Mexico City (v. Buddy Moreno), Blue Lou, Charmaine, Let's Go Home, Maria Elena (v. Dick Haymes), On the Alamo, I'll Walk Alone (v. Kitty Kallen), Love Department, There Goes That Song Again (v. Kitty Kallen), Steel Guitar Rag
Sunbeam	1954 (with Buddy Rich; Superior, Wisconsin May 29, 1954, and Aragon Ballroom, Chicago June 18–20, 1954)	1976	SB 217	Stomp and Whistle, Cherry, Palladium Party, Jackpot, That Old Black Magic, Back Beat Boogie, Theme, Opening Announcement, Stealing Apples, Blue Skies, Easy, Six Two and Even, Roll 'Em / Theme
Kaydee	Coast to Coast with Harry James and His Orchestra (live at The Astor Roof, New York, 5/25/1944 and Casino Gardens, Ocean Park, CA 12/3/1944)	1976	KD 1	Jiggers, Wrap Your Troubles in Dreams, It's a Cryin' Shame, It Could Happen to You, It Had to Be You, I'll Get By, Cherry, Take It Easy, Two O'Clock Jump (Theme), "Just You, Just Me", The Love I Long For, I'm Beginning to See the Light, I'm Confessin', I Cover the Waterfront, Backbeat Boogie, Closing Theme
Jazz Archives	The Young Harry James (1939 and 1941)	1976	JA 31	St. Louis Blues (v. Jack Palmer), To You (v. Frank Sinatra), Cross Country Jump, From the Bottom of My Heart (v. Frank Sinatra), Flash, Two O'Clock Jump, Waltz in 'C' Sharp Minor, Jefferies' Blues, Flying Home, Will You Still Be Mine? (v. Helen Forrest), Diane, I Got It Bad (v. Helen Forrest), Girl of My Dreams, Honeysuckle Rose, The Man I Love (v. Helen Forrest), Rose Room
Bandstand	Two O'Clock Jump (1944)	1976	BS 7131	Just You Just Me, The Love I Long For, I'm Beginning to See the Light, I'm Confessin', I Cover the Waterfront, Back Beat Boogie / Theme, Jiggers, It Could Happen to You, It Had to Be You, I'll Get By, Cherry, Take It Easy, Two O'Clock Jump
Aircheck	On the Air (remote broadcasts from 1940, 1944 and 1946)	1977	18	Perdido, Wouldn't It Be Nice, Rose Room, And Then You Kissed Me, St. Louis Blues, Amor, Don't Blame Me, Peg o' My Heart, Maybe, Concerto for Trumpet, Too Romantic, Feet Draggin' Blues, The Man I Love, I Can't Begin to Tell You, I'M in Love with Two Sweathearts, Blue Skies
Fanfare	Harry James and His Orchestra, Vocals by Frank Sinatra (1939, 1940)	~1977	LP 9-109	Theme-Introduction, Shorty George, To You (v. Frank Sinatra), King Porter Stomp, From the Bottom of My Heart (v. Frank Sinatra), Beer Barrel Polka, White Sails (v. Connie Haines), Well Alright, Two O'Clock Jump, Theme-Closing, Theme-Introduction, Maybe (v. Dick Haymes), Concerto for Trumpet, Too Romantic (v. Dick Haymes), Feet Draggin' Blues, Theme-Closing
Fanfare	June 6 - 1944 The D-Day Broadcasts	1977	LP 12-112	Introduction...Untitled Instrumental (Love Department), Too Much in Love (v. Buddy DiVito), It Could Happen to You (v. Kitty Kallen), On the Alamo, I'll Remember April, In Times Like These (Interrupted for D-Day Announcement) (v. Kitty Kallen), King Porter Stomp, Introduction - I'll Walk Alone (v. Kitty Kallen), You Send Me, Cherry, Everyday of My Life, It's Been So Long, Take It Easy, Back Beat Boogie, Closing
Fanfare	Live Broadcast from the Astor Roof August 28, 1942	~1977	LP 36-136	Introduction, You're in Love with Someone Else, Sleepy Lagoon, Memphis Blues, But Not for Me, Tangerine, Feet Draggin' Blues, Crazy Rhythm, Save the American Way, This Is Worth Fighting For, By Beloved Is Rugged, Back Beat Boogie, Fantasetto, I Remember You, I'm Getting Tired So I Can Sleep (And Dream of You), Girl of My Dreams
Hindsight	The Uncollected Harry James and His Orchestra, 1943-1946	1977	HSR 102	Opening Theme (Ciribiribin) -Into- "If That's the Way You Want It, Baby", Indiana, Body and Soul, I'm Satisfied, I Couldn't Sleep a Wink Last Night, Rose Room, All of Me, Shorty George, On the Sunny Side of the Street, Between the Devil and the Deep Blue Sea, Stardust, It's Been So Long, My Baby Just Cares for Me, Girl of My Dreams, You Go to My Head, Shady Lady Bird
Joyce	One Night Stand with Harry James at The Astor (featuring Buddy Rich on Drums, 1953)	1977	LP 1044	Floozie, Manhattan, Your Cheatin' Heart (v. April Ames), Charmaine, Jazz Me Blues, Ruby, Palladium Party, Ultra, Cherry, Lollipop, September Song
Joyce	Spotlight on Harry James (1946)	1977	LP 4010	The Man I Love, E Bob O Lee Bob (v. Ginny Powell), You'll Never Know, Two O'Clock Jump, Temptation (v. Ginny Powell), I've Got It Bad and That Ain't Good, King Porter Stomp, Perdido, Blue Skies, Out of Nowhere (v. Buddy DeVito), Baby What You Do to Me (v. Ginny Powell), St. Louis Blues
Joyce	One Night Stand with Harry James with Cab Calloway (1944, 1945)	1978	LP 1054	Perdido, There Must Be a Way, Loveless Love, Lady Be Good, I'm Beginning to See the Light, A Blue Serge Suit with a Belt in the Back, Down By the Old Mill Stream, Laura, St. Louis Blues, Joe Blow, Where or When, I'll Remember April, Open Up That Door, Home
Joyce	The Radio Discs of Harry James Volume 3 (1949/1954)	1978	LP 2014	Your Red Wagon, Caravan, Where or When, Cottontail, Who's Sorry Now?, Bali Hai, A Little Bird Told Me, Perdido, Too Close for Comfort, Mr. Wonderful, Honeysuckle Rose, Somebody Loves Me, Blues in the Night, Swing Low Sweet Chariot, Sleepy Time Gal
Sandy Hook	One Night Stand (live from Meadowbrook Gardens, CA 2/10/1946 and Hotel Astor Roof, New York 5/25/1953)	1978	SH 2004	Jump Sauce, I Can't Begin to Tell You (v. Ginny Powell), It's the Talk of the Town, Who's Sorry Now (v. Willie Smith), I Should Care (v. Buddy DeVito), Temptation (v.Ginny Powell), I'm in Love with Two Sweethearts (v. Buddy DeVito), All of Me, Don't Be That Way, 'Til I Waltz Again with You (v. April Ames), Palladium Party, Down South Camp Meeting, Two O'Clock Jump
Giants of Jazz Productions	Swingin' N' Sweet	1978	GOJ LP-1009	Ciribiribin (Theme), Perdido, Blues in the Night, Honeysuckle Rose, Moonlight Fiesta, Two O'Clock Jump, Stardust, Roll 'Em, Ciribiribin (Theme), Don't Be That Way, Cherry, Love Is Just Around the Corner, Somebody Loves Me, Tabu, Tenderly, The Great Lie
Hindsight	The Uncollected Harry James and His Orchestra, 1943-1946 Vol. 2	1978	HSR 123	Charmaine, Harpie's Bazaar, My Old Flame, Blue Turning Grey Over You, All of Me, I Cover the Waterfront, G-Flat Special, Blue Lou, I've Found a New Baby, Ain't She Sweet, I'll Be Around, Exactly Like You, I've Had This Feeling Before, Cinderella, How High the Moon, Old Folks At Home
Hindsight	The Uncollected Harry James and His Orchestra, 1948-1949 Vol. 3	1979	HSR 135	Broadcast Opening & -Into- How High the Moon, Lazy River, Better Have Four, Broadcast Opening & Into New York Blues, Sabre Dance, Blue and Sentimental, Shine, You Turned the Tables on Me, Rank Frank, Forgotten, I May Be Wrong, Proclamation
Hindsight	The Uncollected Harry James and His Orchestra, 1943-1946 Vol. 4	1979	HSR 141	Opening Theme Into Joe Bloe, Sweet and Lovely (v. Buddy DiVito), Easy Street, Honeysuckle Rose, It Can't Be Wrong, Nice Work If You Can Get It (v. Buddy DiVito), Sentimental Journey, It Must Be Jelly, I've Had My Moments, Do Nothin' Till You Hear from Me (v. Helen Forrest), Always (v. Buddy Moreno), Just a Sittin' and a Rockin', Remember (v. Buddy Moreno), Peg o' My Heart, More Than You Know (v. Helen Forrest), Mr. Coed
Hindsight	The Uncollected Harry James and His Orchestra, 1943-1953 Vol. 5	1979	HSR 142	If I Had You, Autumn in New York, Somebody Loves Me (v. Helen Forrest), Come Rain or Come Shine (v. Buddy DiVito), What Is This Thing Called Love, I Don't Know Why, Blue Skies, Opus #1, Opening Theme -Into- A Tree Grows in Burbank, Moonlight Bay, People's Choice, My Old Flame, Piccadilly, Sugar Blues (v. Johnny Mercer), Man I Love, Don't Get Around Much Anymore
Giants of Jazz Productions	Saturday Night Swing (Hollywood 12/1953 - 01/1954)	1979	GOJ LP-1016	Paladium Party, What Am I Here For?, "Six, Two and Even", "Bewitched, Bothered and Bewildered (v. Buddy Rich)", Moritat, I Cover the Waterfront, Back Beat Boogie, Moonglow, Blues for Lovers Only, Who's Sorry Now (v. Willie Smith), Sleepy Time Gal, Caravan, Strictly Instrumental, You Made Me Love You, Caxton Hall Swing
Sunbeam	Live! (Hollywood Palladium 1953 and Freedomland, N.Y. 1962. Harry James, Willie Smith, Buddy Rich)	1979	SB 230	Shiny Stockings, Just Lucky, Doodling, Jazz Connoisseur, Man with a Horn, Coo Coo, Two O'Clock Jump, Ultra, Symphony, Don't Be That Way, Don't Get Around Much Anymore, The New Two O'Clock Jump
Joyce	One Night Stand with Harry James on Staten Island (1945, 1947)	1979	LP 1064	9:20 Special, Laura, Tea for Two, I'm Beginning to See the Light, I Walk My Post in a Military Manner, Charmaine, Friend of Yours, Two O'clock Jump, Cottontail, Night Special, Blue Turning Gray Over You, King Porter Stomp
Joyce	One Night Stand with Harry James on Tour in '64 (Midwest, October 1964)	1979	LP 1074	In a Mellotone, Sultry Serenade, I'm Getting Sentimental Over You, Pennies from Heaven, Koo Koo, Flying Home, Danny Boy, Say It Isn't So, Two O'Clock Jump, If I Could Be with You, Prelude to a Kiss, Tuxedo Junction, Mood Indigo, Until the Real Thing Comes Along, Rainbow Kiss
Joyce	One Night Stand with Harry James at The Fireman's Ball (War Memorial Auditorium, Syracuse, New York, May 18, 1962)	1980	1084	Cute, Sleepy Lagoon, Shiny Stockings, Unknown, Cherry, Don't Get Around Much Anymore, Every Day, September Song, That Old Black Magic, After Supper Blues, Sunday Morning, Man with a Horn, Cottontail
Hindsight	The Uncollected Harry James and His Orchestra, 1947-1949 Vol. 6	1980	HSR 150	Who's Got the Ball, Lover Come Back to Me, Pagan Love Song, Poppin' Off, Medley: When It's Sleepy Time Down South/Dream a Little Dream of Me, You Came a Long Way from St. Louis (v. Willie Smith), "Ooh, Look-A There, Ain't She Pretty", Lover, Queer Street, Tuxedo Junction, Forgotten, Things Ain't What They Used to Be, Lullaby of the Leaves, The One I Love (v. Skylarks)
Insight	The Great American Dance Bands: Harry James and His Orchestra (1943-1953)	1981	IN 203	Body & Soul, I Couldn't Sleep a Wink Last Night, Charmaine, How High the Moon, Stardust, Sugar Blues, Do Nothin' Till You Hear from Me, Lazy River, Always, Autumn in New York
Joyce	One Night Stand with Harry James and Pretty Kitty Kallen (1945)	1981	1094	Wouldn't It Be Nice, Amour, I'm Beginning to See the Light, Sweetheart of All My Dreams, Oh Brother, 11:60 P.M., Somebody Loves Me, I'm Gonna Love That Guy, Candy, Fellow on a Furlough, Don't You Notice Anything New?, My Beloved Is Rugged, I Don't Care Who Knows It
Sounds Good Music	Live! in London (1971)	1981	SG 8002	Theme (Ciribiribin), Don't Be That Way, Shiny Stockings, Moonglow, Opus #1, That's All, Trumpet Blues, Charade, The HJ Blues, Apples, Hits Medley (I Had the Craziest Dream, You Made Me Love You, I Cried for You, It's Been a Long Long Time, I Don't Want to Walk Without You, I've Heard That Song Before, Two O'Clock Jump, Theme (Ciribiribin)
Aircheck	On the Air - Volume II (remote broadcasts from 1942 and 1945)	1982	33	Opening/Theme, "Just You, Just Me", Night and Day, By the Shalimar, Oh Brother!, By the Light of the Silvery Moon, St. Louis Blues, Closing/Theme, "I Don't Want to Walk Without You", One Dozen Roses, Two O'Clock Jump, Moon Over Manakoora, King Porter Stomp, I Walk My Post (In a Military Manner), Pagan Love Song
Joyce	One Night Stand with Harry James in New Jersey (1944 & 1946)	1983	1104	Perdido, Wouldn't It Be Nice, Rose Room, And Then You Kissed Me, St Louis Blues, Amour, Don't Blame Me, Peg o' My Heart, Easy Street, Seems Like Old Times, I Can't Begin to Tell You, Indiana, Moonglow
Joyce	One Night Stand with Harry James at The Click (Philadelphia, December 1, 1947)	1983	1114	Theme (Ciribiribin), Redigal Jump, Near You (v. Marion Morgan), Kate (v. Tiny Timbrell), Ab-mur, Forgiving You (v. Buddy DeVito), Feet Draggin' Blues, Stomping at The Savoy (Extended Version), Lover Come Back to Me, I Understand (v. Buddy DeVito), I Want to Be Loved (v. Marion Morgan), Cottontail
Joyce	One Night Stand with Harry James at The Blue Note (The Blue Note, Chicago, Nov 26, 1958 and the Aragon Ballroom, Chicago, Oct 1953)	1983	1124	Here's One, Kinda Like the Blues, Happiness Is a Thing Called Joe (v. Jilla Webb), Song of the Wanderer (v. Ernie Andrews), Willow Weep for Me, Blues for Sale, If I'm Lucky, "You, You, You" (v. April Ames), That Old Feeling, Floozie, No Other Love (v. April Ames), Sentimental Journey, Back Beat Boogie
Joyce	One Night Stand with Harry James and His Swingin` '46 Band	1984	1134	Keblah, I've Got the Sun in the Morning (v. Marion Morgan), Untitled Juan Tizol Arrangement, Back Home in Indiana, Friar Rock, All of Me, Surrender (v. Marion Morgan), I Don't Know Why, Blue Lou, Together, Out of Nowhere (v. Buddy DeVito), Moten Swing, And Then It's Heaven (v. Buddy DeVito), Opus No. 1
Sandy Hook	Harry James and His Big Band Live in Concert (London Oct 23, 1971)	1984	SH-2094	Ciribirbin, Don't Be That Way, Shiny Stockings, Moonglow, Opus One, Trumpet Blues, Charade, Sandy Hook Blues, Apples, The James Hit Parade (medley), Two O'Clock Jump, Ciribiribin
First Heard	Live from Clearwater, Florida Vol. 1 (1970)	1984	FH 56	Theme/Don't Be That Way, Tuxedo Junction, Summertime, Tweet Tweet, Take the 'A' Train, Gigi, I'm Beginning to See the Light, Embraceable You, Moten Swing, Opus One, Cocktails for Two
First Heard	Live from Clearwater, Florida Vol. 2 (1970)	1984	FH 57	Corner Pocket, Traces, Cotton Tail, Somewhere My Love (Lara's Theme), Danny Boy, Ultra, Jersey Bounce, "We Almost Made It This Time, Didn't We?", Don't Get Around Much Any More, Malaguena Salerosa / Cocktails for Two
First Heard	Live from Clearwater, Florida Vol. 3 (1970)	1984	FH 58	The Jazz Connoisseur, Watch What Happens, Drums Feature, Come Rain or Come Shine, Shiny Stockings, A Sleepy Lagoon, You Made Me So Very Happy, That's Thad, Medley, The Two O'clock Jump
Joyce	One Night Stand with Harry James at The Aragon Ballroom (1954)	~1985	1141	Theme (Ciribiribin), Stealin' Apples, Serenade in Blue, Blue Skies, Easy, You'll Never Know (v. Paula Gilbert), Roll 'Em, Theme, Theme (Ciribiribin), Six Two and Even, Lush Life, Jackpot, September Song, Back Beat Boogie
Joyce	One Night Stand with Harry James on The Dinah Shore Show (1946, 1948)	~1985	1144	The Highway to Love (v. Dinah Shore), Lilly Bolero (v. Dinah Shore), Bye Bye Baby (v. Johnny Mercer), Sleepy Time Gal, Lullaby Land (v. Dinah Shore), Pagan Love Song, Beg Your Pardon (v. Dinah Shore), Cincinnati (v. Johnny Mercer), The Man I Love (v. Dinah Shore), Lover Come Back to Me, Surrender (v. Marion Morgan), And Then It's Heaven (v. Buddy DeVito), What Is This Thing Called Love?, Easy
Joyce	One Night Stand with Harry James at The War Bond Rally (San Diego, CA Nov 30, 1944; Jun 13, 1944; Apr 12, 1946)	~1986	1154	Theme, Blue Skies, I'm Beginning to See the Light (v. Kitty Kallen), The Love I Long For (v. Buddy DeVito), 9:20 Special, I'm Confessin', Perdido, I'll Walk Alone (v. Kitty Kallen), Private Mary Brown (v. Morton Downy), I'll Get By (v. Buddy DeVito), St. Louis Blues, All of Me, I Can't Begin to Tell You (v. Ginny Powell), I'm in Love with Two Sweethearts (v. Buddy DeVito), Moonglow, Opus No. 1
JRC	Harry James: The Post War Period	~1986	JRC 1207	All of Me, I Can't Begin to Tell You, I'm in Love with Two Sweethearts, Moonglow, Opus No. 1, I Still Get Jealous, Cottontail, Night Special, Forgiving You, I Want to Be Loved, Blue Turning Grey Over You, "Six, Two and Even", The Nearness of You, Back Beat Boogie
Joyce	Harry James at The Casino Gardens (Picture Disc, 1941, 1945)	1988	PIX 1	Theme, 9:20 Special, There Must Be a Way, It's Been So Long, It's the Talk of the Town, It Must Be Jelly, If This Isn't Love, "Ya-Ta-Ta, Ya-Ta-Ta", Ain't Misbehavin', Blue Lou, Dodger's Fan Dance, Minka, Juanita, "Listen, Listen"
Jazz Hour Compact Classics	1964 Live! in the Holiday Ballroom Chicago	1989	JH 1001	Ciribiribin, Cubana Chant, In a Mellotone, Sultry Serenade, I'm Getting Sentimental, Koo Koo, Flyin' Home, Two O'clock Jump, Drum Solo, Malagueña Salerosa, Blues Inside Out, Sunday Morning, He's Gone Now, Tuxedo Junction, King Porter Stomp, Drum Solo, Big Time (Jazz Connoisseur), Rainbow Kiss
Renown Records	The Bands of Renown (1955 live at The Hollywood Palladium)	1993	RR-1002-2	Trumpet Blues, Serenade in Blue, Cherry, Palladium Party, Marchin', Cherry Pink and Apple Blossom White, Autumn Leaves, Roll 'Em, Lush Life, You Made Me Love You, Don't Be That Way, Symphony, Stealin' Apples, Sleepy Lagoon, Man with a Horn, Ultra, Jalousie, Two O'Clock Jump, Back Beat Boogie
Mr. Music	Harry James and His New Jazz Band, Vol. 1 (1956 live radio transcripts and at The Hollywood Palladium)	2000	MMCD; 7010	Perdido, What Am I Here For?, It's All Right with Me, Palladium Party, Back Beat Boogie, "Bewitched, Bothered and Bewildered", Two O'Clock Jump, Blues for Lovers Only, Thou Swell, Moonlight Fiesta, Who's Sorry Now?, Blues in the Night, Honeysuckle Rose, It All Depends on You, Somebody Loves Me, My Funny Valentine, Don't Be That Way, I Cover the Waterfront, "Lover, Come Back to Me", Caxton Hall Swing
Mr. Music	Harry James and His New Jazz Band, Vol. 2 (1956 live radio transcripts and at The Hollywood Palladium)	2001	MMCD; 7012	Roll 'Em, Sleepy Time Gal, Lover, You Made Me Love You, Mack the Knife, This Time the Dream's on Me, Moonglow, Caravan, There'll Be Some Changes Made, Tenderly, "Six, Two and Even", The Nearness of You, Tabu, Cry Me a River, Cherry, Love Is Just Around the Corner, Strictly Instrumental, Stardust, Let There Be Love, The Great Lie
Mr. Music	Harry James 'Live' on the Coast (1943-1944)	2009	MMCD; 7018	Theme/Intro, Jump Sauce, You Are Too Beautiful, It's Been So Long, Flatbush Flanagan, "You Better Give Me Lots of Lovin', Honey", Blue Skies, You Go to My Head, My Melancholy Baby, Back Beat Boogie, Always, I've Had this Feeling Before, If I Had You, You're the Rainbow, That Old Feeling, How Sweet You Are, Chelsea Bridge, Feet Draggin' Blues, Two O'Clock Jump, Sierra, Too Marvelous for Words, On The Alamo

==== Soundtrack / stage & screen albums ====
Label	Title	Year	Catalog #	Track List
Columbia	Young Man with a Horn (Harry James and Doris Day)	1950	CL 6106 (10-inch LP)	I May Be Wrong (But I Think You're Wonderful), Get Happy, The Man I Love, Too Marvelous for Words, The Very Thought of You, Limehouse Blues, Melancholy Rhapsody, With a Song in My Heart
Columbia	Young Man with a Horn (Harry James and Doris Day)	1954	CL 582	I May Be Wrong (But I Think You're Wonderful), The Man I Love, The Very Thought of You, Pretty Baby, (Note: Doris Day Orchestra) Melancholy Rhapsody, Would I Love You (Love You, Love You), Too Marvelous for Words, Get Happy, I Only Have Eyes for You, Limehouse Blues, With a Song in My Heart, Lullaby of Broadway
Legacy / Columbia	Young Man with a Horn (Harry James and Doris Day)	1999	CK 65508	tracks above plus Moanin' Low
Joyce	Film Tracks of Harry James	1979	3007	You Made Me Love You, Private Buckaroo, Three Little Sisters, Six Jerks in a Jeep, That's the Moon My Son, Nobody Knows the Trouble I've Seen, Concerto for Trumpet, Don't Sit Under the Apple Tree, James Session, Johnny Get Your Gun, Do You Love Me, As If I Didn't Have Enough on My Mind, Do You Love Me, Eight Bar Riff, St. Louis Blues

==== Compilation albums ====
Label	Title	Year	Catalog #	Track List
Columbia	All-Time Favorites	1948	CL 6009 (10-inch LP)	Ciribiribin, Sleepy Lagoon, One O'Clock Jump, Two O'Clock Jump, You Made Me Love You, Music Makers, The Flight of the Bumble Bee, Concerto for Trumpet
Columbia	All-Time Favorites	1955	CL 655	Ciribiribin, Sleepy Lagoon, One O'Clock Jump, Two O'Clock Jump, You Made Me Love You, Music Makers, The Flight of the Bumble Bee, Concerto for Trumpet, Don't Be That Way, Flatbush Flanagan, September Song, Sleepy Time Gal
Columbia	All-Time Favorites	1987	A 20715	Ciribiribin, Sleepy Lagoon, One O'Clock Jump, Two O'Clock Jump, You Made Me Love You, Music Makers, The Flight of the Bumble Bee, Concerto for Trumpet, Don't Be That Way, Flatbush Flanagan, September Song, Sleepy Time Gal
Columbia	All-Time Favorites	199?	WK 75009	Ciribiribin, Sleepy Lagoon, One O'Clock Jump, Two O'Clock Jump, You Made Me Love You, Music Makers, The Flight of the Bumble Bee, Concerto for Trumpet, Don't Be That Way, Flatbush Flanagan, September Song, Sleepy Time Gal
Columbia	Trumpet Time	1949	CL 6044 (10-inch LP)	I'll Get By (As Long as I Have You), Ain't Misbehavin', I'm Always Chasing Rainbows, Trumpet Rhapsody, I'm Beginning to See the Light, Strictly Instrumental, My Silent Love
Columbia	Harry James Dance Parade	1950	CL 6088 (10-inch LP)	Flash, Back Beat Boogie, Feet Draggin' Blues, Cross Country Jump, Record Session, Sharp as a Tack, Jeffrie's Blues, Crazy Rhythm
Columbia	The Man with the Horn (House Party Series)	1955	CL 2527 (10-inch LP)	The Man with the Horn, I'll Get By, My Silent Love, Ain't Misbehavin', I'm Always Chasing Rainbows, I'm Beginning to See the Light
Columbia Record Club	Serenade for Trumpet	1955	CB 10	Bye Bye Blues, Ain't She Sweet, Sugar Foot Stomp, Moonlight Bay, Moanin' Low, Serenade in Blue, Two O'clock Jump, Ciribiribin (They're So in Love), Sleepy Lagoon, You Made Me Love You (I Didn't Want to Do It), The Moon of Manakoora, I Had the Craziest Dream
Harmony	Harry James and His Great Vocalists	1959	HL 7159	On a Little Street in Singapore, But Not for Me, Montevideo, "It's Been a Long, Long Time", Skylark, I'll Get By, Manhattan Serenade, It's Funny to Everyone but Me, I'm Beginning to See the Light, Yes Indeed!
Harmony	Trumpet Rhapsody and Other Great Instrumentals	1959	HL 7162	Trumpet Rhapsody (Part I), Trumpet Rhapsody (Part II), Jump Town, Night Special, Back Beat Boogie, Trumpet Blues, James Session, The Mole, B-19, Carnival of Venice
Harmony	Harry James Plays Songs That Sold a Million	1959	HL 7191	Three Coins in the Fountain, The High and the Mighty, Little Things Mean a Lot, Moonglow, Hernando's Hideaway, Ruby, Mona Lisa, If I Loved You, Bali Ha'i, Autumn Leaves
Harmony	Harry James Plays Songs That Sold a Million	1967	HS 11245	Three Coins in the Fountain, The High and the Mighty, Little Things Mean a Lot, Moonglow, Hernando's Hideaway, Ruby, Mona Lisa, If I Loved You, Bali Ha'i, Autumn Leaves
Harmony	Strictly Instrumental	1960	HL 7269	Strictly Instrumental, Flash, Cherry, Memphis Blues, Crazy Rhythm, 9:20 Special, Ain't Misbehavin', Tuxedo Junction Pt 1, Tuxedo Junction Pt 2, Dodgers' Fan Dance
Capitol	The Hits of Harry James	1961	M 1515	The Mole, You Made Me Love You, I've Heard That Song Before, Trumpet Blues, Cherry, I'm Beginning to See the Light, Sleepy Lagoon, Two O'Clock Jump, I Cried for You, Music Makers, Velvet Moon, Ciribiribin
Capitol	The Hits of Harry James	1961	T 1515	The Mole, You Made Me Love You, I've Heard That Song Before, Trumpet Blues, Cherry, I'm Beginning to See the Light, Sleepy Lagoon, Two O'Clock Jump, I Cried for You, Music Makers, Velvet Moon, Ciribiribin
Capitol	The Hits of Harry James	1975?	SY 4559	The Mole, You Made Me Love You, I've Heard That Song Before, Trumpet Blues, Cherry, I'm Beginning to See the Light, Sleepy Lagoon, Two O'Clock Jump, I Cried for You, Music Makers, Velvet Moon, Ciribiribin
Pickwick	Mr. Trumpet	1962	PC 3006	Strictly Instrumental, Autumn Serenade, Ring for Porter, Cotton Pickin', Blues for Harry's Sake, "It's Been a Long, Long Time", Countin', Just Lucky, One on the House, In a Sentimental Mood (previously unissued)
Pickwick	Mr. Trumpet	1962	SPC 3006	Strictly Instrumental, Autumn Serenade, Ring for Porter, Cotton Pickin', Blues for Harry's Sake, "It's Been a Long, Long Time", Countin', Just Lucky, One on the House, In a Sentimental Mood (previously unissued)
MGM	Twenty-fifth Anniversary Album	1964	E 4214	Ciribiribin, You Made Me Love You (I Didn't Want to Do It), Take the "A" Train, Lush Life, Ultra, Shiny Stockings, Theme from Orfeu Negro, Sunday Morning, What a Woman Feels, Doodlin', The Jazz Connoisseur, King Porter Stomp, Satin Doll, Jersey Bounce
MGM	Twenty-fifth Anniversary Album	1964	SE 4214	Ciribiribin, You Made Me Love You (I Didn't Want to Do It), Take the "A" Train, Lush Life, Ultra, Shiny Stockings, Theme from Orfeu Negro, Sunday Morning, What a Woman Feels, Doodlin', The Jazz Connoisseur, King Porter Stomp, Satin Doll, Jersey Bounce
Pickwick	You Made Me Love You	1966	PC 3044	You Made Me Love You, Sleepy Lagoon, My Silent Love, Bangtail, I've Heard That Song Before, I Cried for You, Music Makers, Sleepytime Gal, Jalousie, James Session
Pickwick	You Made Me Love You	1966	SPC 3044	You Made Me Love You, Sleepy Lagoon, My Silent Love, Bangtail, I've Heard That Song Before, I Cried for You, Music Makers, Sleepytime Gal, Jalousie, James Session
Pickwick	The Shadow of Your Smile	1967	SPC 3126	The Shadow of Your Smile, Mexicali Rose, Streets of Laredo, Malaguena Salerosa, Red Roses for a Blue Lady, Going Out of My Head, Don't Be That Way, A Taste of Honey, "I Can Dream, Can't I?"
Columbia	Harry James' Greatest Hits	1967	CL 2630	Ciribiribin, You Made Me Love You, All or Nothing At All, Sleepy Lagoon, I Had the Craziest Dream, Two O'Clock Jump, Cherry, I'll Get By, I've Heard That Song Before, "It's Been a Long, Long Time", The Man with the Horn
Columbia	Harry James' Greatest Hits	1967	CS 9430	Ciribiribin, You Made Me Love You, All or Nothing At All, Sleepy Lagoon, I Had the Craziest Dream, Two O'Clock Jump, Cherry, I'll Get By, I've Heard That Song Before, "It's Been a Long, Long Time", The Man with the Horn
Columbia	Harry James' Greatest Hits	1967	PC 9430	Ciribiribin, You Made Me Love You, All or Nothing At All, Sleepy Lagoon, I Had the Craziest Dream, Two O'Clock Jump, Cherry, I'll Get By, I've Heard That Song Before, "It's Been a Long, Long Time", The Man with the Horn
Harmony	Laura	1969	HS 11326	With a Song in My Heart, These Foolish Things (Remind Me of You), When the Sun Comes Out, Embraceable You, Too Marvelous for Words, How Deep Is the Ocean (How High Is the Sky), Laura (From "Laura"), Ciribiribin (They're So in Love), Bye Bye Blues
Blu-Disc	The Unheard Harry James	196?	T 1010	Willow Weep for Me, From the Bottom of My Heart, Melancholy Mood, Vol Vistu Gaily Star, Montevideo, La Paloma, Ol' Man River, Answer Man, Jeffries's Blues, Sharp as a Tack, Aurora, Record Session (First Alternative Take), Record Session (Second Alternative Take), B-19, Easter Parade, Crazy Rhythm
Longines Symphonette Society	Dance-Band Spectacular (5xLP Box Set Compilation)	1972	LS 217	Ciribiribin, Sleepy Time Gal, I Cried for You (v. Helen Forrest), Trumpet Blues, Blues for Sale, Do You Know What It Means to Miss New Orleans, Bells, Street Scene, Walkin' on Air, Melancholy Rhapsody, You Made Me Love You, James Session, My Silent Love (v. Bob Marlo), Blues on a Count, Just for Fun, Sleepy Lagoon, Cherry, These Foolish Things, Blues for Lovers Only, Bee Gee, Autumn Serenade, Fair and Warmer, I've Heard That Song Before (v. Helen Forrest), Countin', You're My Thrill, Jalousie, The Mole, Velvet Moon, Somebody Loves Me, Blues for Harry's Sake, I Want a Little Girl, Ring for Porter, I'm Beginning to See the Light (v. Helen Forrest), J. Walkin', What Am I Here For, Carnival, Blue Again, Barn 12, Moten Swing, One on the House, Music Makers, Cotton Pickin', It's Been a Long Long Time (v. Helen Forrest), Bangtail, Crazy Rhythm, The New Two O'Clock Jump, Just Lucky, Don' Cha Go Away Mad, Willow Weep for Me, Here's One
Harmony	The Beat of the Big Bands: Harry James	1973	KH 32018	One for My Baby (and One More for the Road), (Get Your Kicks on) Route 66, I'll Remember April, Perdido, Tenderly, You Made Me Love You, The Man with the Horn, The Flight of the Bumble Bee, The Moon of Manakoora, Two O'Clock Jump
Sony MSP (Note: Sony MSP - Sony Music Special Products)	The Beat of the Big Bands: Harry James	1992	A 25298	One for My Baby (and One More for the Road), (Get Your Kicks on) Route 66, I'll Remember April, Perdido, Tenderly, You Made Me Love You, The Man with the Horn, The Flight of the Bumble Bee, The Moon of Manakoora, Two O'Clock Jump
Big Band Archives	In the Beginning (1937–41)	197?	LP 1206	Hodge Podge, Tuxedo Junction, Headin' for Hallelujah, Maybe (v. Dick Haymes), Swanee River, Exactly Like You, Alice Blue Gown, Four or Five Times, Answer Man, Duke's Mixture, The Sheik of Araby, Come and Get It, Tempo Deluxe, Super Chief, Penthouse Serenade, Life Goes to a Party
Big Band Archives	All the Way (1941–54)	1974	LP 2202 (2x LP)	The Great Lie, Three for the Show, All the Way, Ab-Mur, Jughead, Nina, The Beaumont Ride, Ultra, King Porter Stomp, Roly Poly, The Touch, Dear Old Southland, Stomping at The Savoy, Lamond and Mon, East Coast Blues, Redigal Jump, How Dry I Am Blues, Moten Swing (Part 1), Moten Swing (Part 2), In a Mist, Keb-Lah, Kappa Sinc Oinc, The Roach and I, The Lady Was Moody, Tenderly, Shine, When the Sun Comes Out, Chocolate Pie, Queer Street
CSP Encore (Note: CSP - Columbia Special Products)	The Man with the Horn	1979	P 14357	'Tain't What You Do, Comes Love, I Found a New Baby, Fanny May, Sugar Daddy, Avalon, Flash, Night Special, I'm in the Market for You, Back Beat Boogie, La Paloma, Trumpet Rhapsody
The Old Masters	Harry James and His Orchestra 1936-1938	197?	TOM 36	Jubilee, When We're Alone (Penthouse Serenade), "I Can Dream, Can't I?", Life Goes to a Party, Texas Chatter, Song of the Wanderer, It's the Dreamer in Me, One O'Clock Jump, Out of Nowhere, Wrap Your Trouble in Dreams, Lullaby in Rhythm, Little White Lies, Spreadin' Knowledge Around, Zoom Zoom Zoom
Jicko	...For Old Times Sake (1939 and 1951)	197?	8202	From the Bottom of My Heart, Melancholy Mood, My Buddy, It's Funny to Everyone but Me, Here Comes the Night, All or Nothing At All, On a Little Street in Singapore, Who Told You I Cared?, Ciribiribin, Every Day of My Life, Castle Rock, Deep Night, "Farewell, Farewell to Love"
Memory	The Harry James/Frank Sinatra Sessions (1939)	197?	LP 427	From the Bottom of My Heart, From the Bottom of My Heart [Alternate Take], Melancholy Mood, My Buddy, It's Funny to Everyone but Me, Here Comes the Night [Alternate Take], Here Comes the Night, All or Nothing At All, On a Little Street in Singapore, Who Told You I Cared, Ciribiribin, Every Day of My Life
Swing Era	Sharp as a Tack (1939-1953)	19??	LP 1004	Prince Charming, Ballad for Beatnicks, Friar Rock, Blues About Manhattan, The Clipper, It's the Last Time, Easy, Sharp as a Tack, Ya Better Stop, Sweet Jenny Lou, Jeffrie's Blues, When Your Lover Has Gone, Circus Days, I Found a New Baby, Fannie May, Let Me Up
Circle	James and Haymes (1941)	1980	CLP 5 (Note: The Circle LPs consist of recordings James made at World transcription sessions, many of which were previously unreleased commercially.)	Music Makers, The Things I Love, I'm in the Market for You, Here Comes the Night, Sharp as a Tack, Spring Will Be So Sad, Maria Elena, Let's Go Home, Flying Home, All or Nothing At All, Sonata Moderne, Braggin', Flight of the Bumblebee, Carnival of Venice, Cherry, Two O'Clock Jump
Joyce	The Big Bands' Greatest Vocalists: Dick Haymes, Vol. 1	1980	6001	You've Got Me Out on a Limb, How High the Moon, Fools Rush In, Secrets in the Moonlight, Mister Meadowlark, The Nearness of You, It's the Last Time I'll Fall in Love, One Look At You, Orchids for Remembrance, Maybe, The Moon Won't Talk, I Wouldn't Take a Million, My Greatest Mistake, A Million Dreams Ago
Joyce	The Big Bands' Greatest Vocalists: Dick Haymes, Vol. 2 (with Harry James and His Orchestra, 1940–1941)	1982	6006	I Never Purposely Hurt You, Montevideo, Old Man River, Walkin' by the River, Braggin', Dolores, For Want of a Star, I'll Get By, Don't Cry Cherie, Aurora, My Silent Love, Lament to Love, Lost in Love, A Sinner Kissed an Angel
Joyce	The Big Bands' Greatest Vocalists: Kitty Kallen with The Harry James Orchestra	1982	6017	I'm Beginning to See the Light, I Guess I'll Hang My Tears Out to Dry, I Wish I Knew, I Don't Care Who Knows It, 11:60 P.M., Yah-Ta-Ta-Yah-Ta-Ta, Oh Brother!, I'll Buy That Dream, It's Been a Long Long Time, The Wonder of You, Waitin' for the Train to Come in, "Baby, What You Do to Me", Somebody Loves Me, I'm Gonna Love That Guy
Joyce	Harry James and His Great Male Vocalists (1941-1947)	1982	6022	All for Love, Last Night I Said a Prayer, One Dozen Roses, When You're a Long Long Way from Home, Moonlight Becomes You, A Poem Set to Music, Daybreak, I Tipped My Hat, What Am I Going to Do About You?, I Can't Get Up the Nerve to Kiss You, Tomorrow, Summer Moon, "Ah, But It Happens", You Can Do No Harm
Joyce	The Big Bands' Greatest Vocalists: Marion Morgan (with Harry James and His Orchestra, 1946–1947)	1982	6024	If I'm Lucky, Life Can Be Beautiful, White Christmas, As Long as I'm Dreaming, Heartaches, Love and the Weather, Strange What a Song Can Do, My Future Just Passed, My Friend Irma, Sentimental Souvenirs, Hankerin', Someone Loves Someone, Love, There's Music in the Land
Joyce	The Big Bands' Greatest Vocalists: Buddy DeVito (with Harry James and His Orchestra, 1944–1946)	1982	6026	The Love I Long For, The More I See of You, All of My Life, Laura, If I Loved You, I'm Always Chasing Rainbows, I'm in Love with Two Sweethearts, I Didn't Mean a Word I Said, As If I Didn't Have Enough on My Mind, This Is Always, and Then It's Heaven, I Guess I Expected Too Much, Why Does It Get So Late So Early, Oh But I Do
Circle	1954	1982	CLP 39	Cherry, That Old Black Magic, Palladium Party, Moanin' Low, Embraceable You, Flash, Sleepy Lagoon, Lullaby of Broadway, Autumn Leaves, Sugar Foot Stomp, In the Still of the Night, Caxton Hall Swing
Circle	Autumn Leaves	2006	CCD-39	Cherry, That Old Black Magic, Palladium Party, Moanin' Low, Embraceable You, Flash, Sleepy Lagoon, Lullaby of Broadway, Autumn Leaves, Sugar Foot Stomp, In the Still of the Night, Caxton Hall Swing
51 West	Music Maker	1982	Q 16241	Music Makers, I'm Beginning to See the Light, Around the World, Call Me Irresponsible, A Taste of Honey, Traces, Gigi, More, Pennies from Heaven, Red Wing
Sony MSP	Music Maker	1992	A 18241	Music Makers, I'm Beginning to See the Light, Around the World, Call Me Irresponsible, A Taste of Honey, Traces, Gigi, More, Pennies from Heaven, Red Wing
Time Life	Big Bands: Harry James	1983	STBB 04 (2x LP)	Ciribiribin, Feet Draggin' Blues, It's Funny to Everyone but Me (v. Frank Sinatra), Concerto for Trumpet, Two O'Clock Jump, You Made Me Love You, I'm in the Market for You, Flight of the Bumblebee, My Silent Love (v. Dick Haymes), Flash, Trumpet Blues and Cantabile, All or Nothing At All (v. Frank Sinatra), Back Beat Boogie, I Can't Begin to Tell You (v. Ruth Haag [Betty Grable]), Music Makers, I Had the Craziest Dream (v. Helen Forrest), Willow Weep for Me, I Don't Want to Walk Without You (v. Helen Forrest), Cherry, By the Sleepy Lagoon, I'm Beginning to See the Light (v. Kitty Kallen)
Time Life	Big Bands: Harry James	1992	R960-05	
Sony MSP	Big Bands: Harry James	1992	A 17330	
CBS Special Products	The Music of Your Life (Volume 4)	1983	PM 16933	Ciribiribin, I Had the Craziest Dream, Cherry, I Don't Want to Walk Without You, Sleepy Lagoon, I'm Beginning to See the Light, You Made Me Love You, "It's Been a Long, Long Time", Music Makers, I've Heard That Song Before
Joyce	Harry James - Big Band Arranger (1937-1942)	1983	2023	Life Goes to a Party, One O'Clock Jump, Ciribiribin, Two O'Clock Jump, Feet Draggin' Blues, Flash, Concerto for Trumpet, The Flight of the Bumblebee, The Carnival of Venice, Tempo De Luxe, Flatbush Flanagan, La Paloma, Eli Eli, Miserlou, Estrellita
Joyce	Harry James Plays the Arrangements of Jack Mathias (1939-1942)	1983	2024	Cross Country Jump, Night Special, Back Beat Boogie, Trumpet Rhapsody, Dodger's Fan Dance, Nothin', "Wait Till the Sun Shines, Nellie", Strictly Instrumental, Sleepy Lagoon, Trumpet Blues, Easter Parade, Crazy Rhythm, James Session
Joyce	Harry James Plays the Arrangements of Jimmy Mundy & Andy Gibson (1938-1949)	1983	2025	Out of Nowhere, Wrap Your Troubles in Dreams, Lullaby in Rhythm, Little White Lies, Sweet Georgia Brown, I Found a New Baby, Fannie-May, From the Bottom of My Heart (v. Frank Sinatra), Sugar Daddy, Melancholy Mood (v. Frank Sinatra), Avalon, Super Chief, 9:20 Special, Ultra
Joyce	Harry James Plays the Arrangements of Gray Rains, Leroy Holmes, Billy May, and Paul Villepigue (1941-1950)	1983	2026	Sharp as a Tack, You Made Me Love You, Jughead, Record Session, B-19, The Mole, Blues in the Night, The Clipper, Prince Charming, Carnival, Nina, Brazilian Sleigh Bells, Theme for Cynthia, Sweet Jenny Lou
Joyce	Harry James and His Great Girl Vocalists (1939-1947)	1983	6028	(Bernice Byers:) Blame It on My Last Affair, Love's a Necessary Thing, And the Angels Sing, Got No Time, (Connie Haines:) Comes Love, I Can't Afford to Dream, (Lynn Richards:) Don't Take Your Love from Me, (Betty Grable:) I Can't Begin to Tell You, (Pat Flaherty:) Something for Nothing, (Marion Morgan:) I Don't Care If It Rains All Night, Beyond the Sea, Love of My Life, Every Day I Love You, What Did I Do?
Hindsight	22 Original Big Band Recordings 1943-1953	1984	HSR 406 (2x LP)	Between the Devil and the Deep Blue Sea (v. Helen Forrest and The Song Makers), If I Had You, Always (v. Buddy Moreno), Exactly Like You, Come Rain or Come Shine (v. Buddy DiVito), Nice Work If You Can Get It, I Cover the Waterfront, My Old Flame (v. Gilda Macon), I May Be Wrong (But I Think You're Wonderful), Remember (v. Buddy Moreno), Don't Get Around Much Anymore, Ain't She Sweet, Sugar Blues (v. Johnny Mercer), How High the Moon, "Oh Look-A-There, Ain't She Pretty", What Is This Thing Called Love, Lover Come Back to Me, I Found a New Baby, Lazy River, All of Me (v. Helen Ward), Blue Skies, The Man I Love
Verve	The Silver Collection	1985	823 229-2	Shiny Stockings, Cotton Tail, Lester Leaps In, Take the 'A' Train, Opus 1, Cherokee, King Porter Stomp, Flying Home, In the Mood, Tuxedo Junction, One O'Clock Jump, She's Gotta Go, Mae & Ray, Sentimental Journey, Ultra, Strictly Instrumental, Crazy Rhythm, Back Beat Boogie
Verve	Compact Jazz	1987	833 285-2	Get Off the Stand, Moanin' Low, My Monday Date, I'm in the Market for You, Harry Not Jesse, Lush Life, Squeeze Me, Sleepy Time Gal, Hot Pink, Spring Can Really Hang You Up the Most, The Jazz Connoisseur, I'm Confessin', Harry's Delight, Weather Bird, I Cover the Waterfront, Rockin' in Rhythm
Savoy Jazz	First-Team Player on the Jazz Varsity	1987	SJL 2262 (2x LP)	Headin' for Hallelujah, Tuxedo Junction, Alice Blue Gown, Palms of Paradise, You've Got Me Out on a Limb, Hodge Podge, Come and Get It, How High the Moon, Carnival of Venice, Boog It, Sheik of Araby, Fools Rush In, Secrets in the Moonlight, Flight of the Bumblebee, Mister Meadowlark, The Nearness of You, Four or Five Times, Super Chief, It's the Last Time I'll Fall in Love, One Look At You, Orchids for Remembrance, Maybe, Tempo Deluxe, The Moon Won't Talk, I Wouldn't Take a Million, My Greatest Mistake, Swanee River, Exactly Like You, A Million Dreams Ago, Hodge Podge, Exactly Like You
Pair	Big Band Favorites	1987	PDL2 1158 (2x LP)	Sleepy Lagoon, "It's Been a Long, Long Time", Trumpet Blues, You Made Me Love You, Music Makers, I've Heard That Song Before, Cherry, Strictly Instrumental, Jalousie, I'm Beginning to See the Light, Two O'Clock Jump, Carnival, Velvet Moon, I Cried for You, Autumn Serenade, Ciribiribin
CBS Special Products	18 Famous Hits	1988	P 21051	Tenderly, It's Been a Long Long Time, I Had the Craziest Dream, Embraceable You, The Very Thought of You, I'll Buy That Dream, These Foolish Things (Remind Me of You), I'll Get By, You'll Never Know, You Made Me Love You, All or Nothing At All, I Can't Begin to Tell You, Sleepy Lagoon, Skylark, I've Heard That Song Before, Sleepy Time Girl, I Don't Want to Walk Without You, Moonlight Becomes You
CBS Special Products	The Best of Harry James (2x LP / CD)	1990	P2 22028	The Very Thought of You, I'm Always Chasing Rainbows, I Don't Want to Walk Without You, All or Nothing At All, Embraceable You, I Can't Begin to Tell You, I'll Get By (As Long as I Have You), You Made Me Love You, Sleepy Lagoon, You'll Never Know, Ciribiribin (They're So in Love), I've Heard That Song Before, It's Been a Long Long Time, Moonlight Becomes You, If I Loved You, Skylark, I Had the Craziest Dream, I'm Beginning to See the Light, Who's Sorry Now?, These Foolish Things (Remind Me of You), Stella By Starlight, Two O'Clock Jump
CBS Special Products	The Best of Harry James (2x LP / CD)	1990	A 22028	
Heartland Music	The Best of Harry James (2x LP / CD)	1990	HL 1106/ 1107	
Columbia	Best of Big Bands	1990	CK 45341	Strictly Instrumental, I've Heard That Song Before, The Man with the Horn, I Had the Craziest Dream, Sleepy Lagoon, I Can't Begin to Tell You, Trumpet Blues & Cantabile, You Made Me Love You, It's Been a Long, Long Time, Ciribiribin, I'll Get By (As Long as I Have You), I Don't Want to Walk Without You, Carnival, The Devil Sat Down and Cried, Music Makers, I'm Beginning to See the Light
Columbia	Snooty Fruity	1990	CK 45447	I'm Confessin' That I Love You, Ain't She Sweet, Who's Sorry Now, Keb-Lah, Moten Swing, East Coast Blues, Blue Turning Grey Over You, Cotton Tail, Tuxedo Junction, Snooty Fruity, Poppin' Off, Forgotten, New Two O'Clock Jump, Deep Purple, The Great Lie, Three for the Show, Perdido, Stompin' at The Savoy
Reader's Digest	Original Golden Hits	1991	RBA 164/D	You Made Me Love You, I've Heard That Song Before, Sleepy Lagoon, I'll Get By (As Long as I Have You), Music Makers, "It's Been a Long, Long Time", One O'Clock Jump, I Had the Craziest Dream, Ciribiribin, All or Nothing at All
Sony MSP	You Made Me Love You	1992	A 22656	You Made Me Love You, Sleepy Lagoon, Willow Weep for Me, Two O'Clock Jump, It's Been a Long, Long Time, Stella By Starlight, Ciribiribin (They're So in Love), Moonlight Becomes You, Skylark, I Can't Begin to Tell You
Sony MSP	You Made Me Love You	1992	BT 22656	You Made Me Love You, Sleepy Lagoon, Willow Weep for Me, Two O'Clock Jump, It's Been a Long, Long Time, Stella By Starlight, Ciribiribin (They're So in Love), Moonlight Becomes You, Skylark, I Can't Begin to Tell You
Columbia / Legacy	The Essence of Harry James	1994	CK 57151	Music Makers, Avalon, It's Funny to Everyone but Me, You Made Me Love You, The Flight of the Bumble-Bee, I Guess I'll Have to Dream the Rest, Skylark, Estrellita, Cherry, "It's Been a Long, Long Time", Serenade in Blue, Manhattan
Columbia / Legacy	The Essence of Harry James	1994	CT 57151	Music Makers, Avalon, It's Funny to Everyone but Me, You Made Me Love You, The Flight of the Bumble-Bee, I Guess I'll Have to Dream the Rest, Skylark, Estrellita, Cherry, "It's Been a Long, Long Time", Serenade in Blue, Manhattan
Columbia / Legacy	Harry James and His Great Vocalists	1995	CK 66371	I'll Get By, I Don't Want to Walk Without You, It's the Dreamer in Me, One Dozen Roses, My Silent Love, I Had the Craziest Dream, I've Heard That Song Before, I'm Beginning to See the Light, "It's Been a Long, Long Time", I Can't Begin to Tell You, Who's Sorry Now, This Is Always, As Long as I'm Dreaming, You Can Do No Wrong, What Am I Gonna Do About You, You'll Never Know
Columbia / Legacy	Harry James & His Orch. Featuring Frank Sinatra – The Complete Recordings 1939	1995	CK 66377	From the Bottom of My Heart, Melancholy Mood, My Buddy, It's Funny to Everyone but Me, Here Comes the Night, All or Nothing At All, On a Little Street in Singapore, Who Told You I Cared?, Ciribiribin (They're So in Love), Every Day of My Life. Following are previously unreleased and/or alternate takes: From the Bottom of My Heart (alt take), Melancholy Mood (alt take), It's Funny to Everyone but Me (alt take), All or Nothing At All (alt take), Stardust, Wishing Will Make It So, If I Didn't Care, The Lamp Is Low, My Love for You, Moon Love, This Is No Dream
Sony MSP	Kitty Kallen, Harry James – Sweet with a Beat	1996	A 28073	I Don't Care Who Knows It, "Yah-Ta-Ta, Yah-Ta-Ta (Talk, Talk, Talk)", "Oh, Brother!", The Wonder of You, Waitin' for the Train to Come in, "Baby, What You Do to Me", When I Dream (I Always Dream of You), To Be Loved By You, Still You'd Break My Heart, Like the Moon Above You
Verve	Jazz Masters 55	1996	314 529 902-2	I Surrender Dear, Walkin', Eyes, Lover Man (Oh, Where Can You Be?), The Truth, End of Town Blues, Hommage À Swee Pea, Cornet Chop Suey, If I Could Be with You, Frenesi, Blues Like, The Jazz Connoisseur, Sophisticated Lady, a Swinging Serenade, Rosebud, Mister Johnson
Sony MSP	Harry James: Swing Town!	1999	A 30530	Roll 'Em, I Don't Care Who Knows It, Squaty Roo, Daddy, Ultra, Who's Sorry Now?, The Beaumont Ride, And the Angels Sing, Cherry, Doncha Go 'Way Mad, Big John's Special, The Devil Sat Down and Cried, One O'Clock Jump, Comes Love, Jump Town, Love (Your Spell Is Everywhere), Memphis in June, Guys and Dolls, Sweet Jenny Lou, 11:60 P.M.
Sony MSP	The Complete Helen Forrest with Harry James	1999	A 34927	The Devil Sat Down and Cried, He's 1-A in the Army and He's A-1 in My Heart, Make Love to Me, J.P. Dooley III, I Don't Want to Walk Without You, But Not for Me, I Remember You, Skylark, You're Too Good for Good-for-Nothing Me, You're in Love with Someone Else (But I'm in Love with You), He's My Guy, That Soldier of Mine, I Cried for You, I Heard You Cried Last Night, Manhattan Serenade, My Beloved Is Rugged, I Had the Craziest Dream, Mister Five By Five, I've Heard That Song Before
Collectors' Choice	The Complete Helen Forrest with Harry James	1999	CCM-081-2	The Devil Sat Down and Cried, He's 1-A in the Army and He's A-1 in My Heart, Make Love to Me, J.P. Dooley III, I Don't Want to Walk Without You, But Not for Me, I Remember You, Skylark, You're Too Good for Good-for-Nothing Me, You're in Love with Someone Else (But I'm in Love with You), He's My Guy, That Soldier of Mine, I Cried for You, I Heard You Cried Last Night, Manhattan Serenade, My Beloved Is Rugged, I Had the Craziest Dream, Mister Five By Five, I've Heard That Song Before
Sony MSP	Spotlight on Harry James	2000	A 30798	Flight of the Bumblebee, Manhattan Serenade, I'm Always Chasing Rainbows, Trumpet Rhapsody (Pts. 1 & 2), Forever Amber, Easter Parade, Guess I'll Hang My Tears Out to Dry, Who's Sorry Now?, Misirlou, Heartaches
Collectables	Spotlight on Harry James	2005	COL-8071	Flight of the Bumblebee, Manhattan Serenade, I'm Always Chasing Rainbows, Trumpet Rhapsody (Pts. 1 & 2), Forever Amber, Easter Parade, Guess I'll Hang My Tears Out to Dry, Who's Sorry Now?, Misirlou, Heartaches
Collectables	Swingtown	2002	COL-CD-7450	Roll 'Em, Sweet Jenny Lou, Hurry Hurry Hurry, Duke's Mixture, Lullabye in Rhythm, "Wait Till the Sun Shines, Nellie", All the Way, Jump Town, Comes Love, Woo-Woo, The Clipper, Doncha Go 'Way Mad, Palladium Party, Redigal Jump, I Still Get Jealous, Dodgers' Fan Dance, King Porter Stomp, Guys and Dolls, Ultra, Tango Blues, Love, B-19, You're a Sweetheart, The Beaumont Ride
Collectables	Sentimental Souvenirs: The Complete Marion Morgan with Harry James & His Orchestra	2005	COL-CD-7637	If I'm Lucky, Life Can Be Beautiful, White Christmas, As Long as I'm Dreaming, Heartaches, Love and the Weather, Strange What a Song Can Do, My Future Just Passed, My Friend Irma, Sentimental Souvenirs, Hankerin', Someone Loves Someone, Forever Amber, Love (Your Spell Is Everywhere), There's Music in the Land, I Don't Care If It Rains All Night, Beyond the Sea, Love of My Life, Ev'ry Day I Love You (Just a Little Bit More), You Can Do No Wrong, It's Awf'lly Lonely Out Tonight, What Did I Do?, You Can't Run Away from Love
Legacy	Ultimate Big Band Collection	2011	88697 80548 2	Ciribiribin, From The Bottom Of My Heart, I Don't Want To Walk Without You, I'll Get By (As Long As I Have You), The Flight Of The Bumble Bee, You Made Me Love You, All Or Nothing At All, I've Heard That Song Before, Sleepy Lagoon, I Can't Begin To Tell You
Sepia	Mona Lisa: Rarities from the Columbia Years 1949-53	2018	SEPIA 1331	Mona Lisa, How Dry I Am Blues, Fruit Cake, The Moonlighter Song, Brazilian Sleigh Bells, Dreamy Melody, My Baby Is Blue, Baby Blues, Lullaby in Boogie, The Brave Bulls (La Virgen De La Macarena), Stomp and Whistle, Can't Wait, Peculiar Kind of Feeling, You Blew Out the Flame (In My Heart), I Don't Think You Love Me Anymore, The Blacksmith Blues, Deep Night, Out of the Dark, I'll Know, Theme from "The Joe Louis Story", The Melancholy Trumpet (Ooh-Wah), La Vie En Rose, Goin' Home (Goin' Home, Goin' Home), Don't Send Me Home, Show Me the Way to Get Out of This World (Cause That's Where Everything Is), Guys and Dolls, Ya' Better Stop

==== Re-issue albums ====
Label	Title	Year	Catalog #	Source Album or New Track List
Harmony	Hollywood Hits	1960	HL 7213	Re-issue of Columbia CL 585 Hollywood's Best (Rosemary Clooney and Harry James)
Metro	Harry Not Jesse: Harry James Plays Neal Hefti	1965	M 536	Re-issue of MGM E/SE 3972 Harry James Plays Neal Hefti ("Fontainebleau" labeled "San Souci")
Metro	Harry Not Jesse: Harry James Plays Neal Hefti	1965	MS 536	Re-issue of MGM E/SE 3972 Harry James Plays Neal Hefti ("Fontainebleau" labeled "San Souci")
Sears	Strictly Instrumental	1966	SP 404	Re-issue of Pickwick PC 3006 Mr. Trumpet
Sears	Strictly Instrumental	1966	SPS 404	Re-issue of Pickwick PC 3006 Mr. Trumpet
Sears	I Cried for You	1967	SP 432	Re-issue of Pickwick PC 3044 You Made Me Love You
Sears	I Cried for You	1967	SPS 432	Re-issue of Pickwick PC 3044 You Made Me Love You
Metro	Big Bands Are Back	1967	M 604	Re-issue of MGM SE 3848 Harry James...Today
Metro	Big Bands Are Back	1967	MS 604	Re-issue of MGM SE 3848 Harry James...Today
Pickwick	The Mellow Horn	1971	PTP 2011	2-album re-issue of Pickwick PC 3006 Mr. Trumpet and Pickwick PC 3044 You Made Me Love You
CSP (Note: CSP - Columbia Special Products)	Young Man with a Horn	197?	ACL 582	Re-issue of Columbia CL 582 Young Man with a Horn (Harry James and Doris Day)
CSP	All Time Favorites	1973	JCL 655	Re-issue of Columbia CL 655 All Time Favorites
CSP	The Beat of the Big Bands	1973	P 13296	Re-issue of Harmony KH 32018 the Beat of the Big Bands
CSP Encore	Hollywood's Best	1974	P 13083	Re-issue of Columbia CL 585 Hollywood's Best (Rosemary Clooney and Harry James)
CSP Encore	Hollywood's Best	1974	EN 13083	Re-issue of Columbia CL 585 Hollywood's Best (Rosemary Clooney and Harry James)
CSP	Harry James Plays the Songs That Sold a Million	1975?	P 13387	Re-issue of Harmony HS 11245 Harry James Plays Songs That Sold a Million
CLE (Note: CLE - Columbia Limited Edition)	Harry James Plays the Songs That Sold a Million	1975?	LE 10406	Re-issue of Harmony HS 11245 Harry James Plays Songs That Sold a Million
CSP	Harry James and His Great Vocalists	1976	P 13585	Re-issue of Harmony HL 7159 Harry James and His Great Vocalists
Applause	More Harry James in Hi-Fi	1982	APCL 3323	Re-issue of Capitol W 712 More Harry James in Hi-Fi
Bainbridge	Ciribiribin	1983	BT 6252	Re-issue of 1968's London SP 44109 The Golden Trumpet of Harry James, plus adds the tune "I Can't Take My Eyes Off You".
Pausa	More Harry James in Hi-Fi	1985	PR 9037	Re-issue of Capitol W 712 More Harry James in Hi-Fi
Sony	Rosemary Clooney & Friends: Ring Around Rosie & Hollywood's Best	2000	A 30630	Re-issue of Rosemary Clooney And The Hi-Lo's Columbia CL 1006 Ring Around Rosie and Rosemary Clooney and Harry James's Columbia CL 585 Hollywood's Best
Collectables	Rosemary Clooney & Friends: Ring Around Rosie & Hollywood's Best	2000	COL-CD-6460	Re-issue of Rosemary Clooney And The Hi-Lo's Columbia CL 1006 Ring Around Rosie and Rosemary Clooney and Harry James's Columbia CL 585 Hollywood's Best
Sony Music SP (Note: Sony Music SP - Sony Music Special Products)	Two Classic Albums from Harry James & His Orchestra	2001	A 052069	Re-issue of Columbia GL 522 One Night Stand and CL 6207 Soft Lights, Sweet Trumpet
Collectables	At the Hollywood Palladium • Trumpet After Midnight	2002	COL-CD-6892	Re-issue of Columbia CL 562 Dancing in Person with Harry James At the Hollywood Palladium and CL 553 Trumpet After Midnight
Collectables	Dance Parade • Your Dance Date	2002	COL-CD-7413	Re-issue of Columbia CL 6088 Harry James Dance Parade and CL 6138 Your Dance Date with Harry James and His Orchestra
Collectables	Juke Box Jamboree • Jazz Session	2002	COL-CD-7414	Re-issue of Columbia CL 615 Juke Box Jamboree and CL 669 Jazz Session
Jazz Beat	Harry James and His New Swingin' Band	2007	515	Re-issue of MGM SE 3778 Harry James and His New Swingin' Band and SE 4003 Requests On-The-Road
Jazz Beat	Harry James... Today!	2007	516	Re-issue of MGM SE 3848 Harry James... Today!, SE 3972 Harry James Plays Neal Hefti, and three tracks from SE 3897 The Spectacular Sound of Harry James

=== Singles ===
Dates shown in the Singles tables below are recording dates. Singles are grouped into tables according to the release year. Some singles were not immediately released or were re-issued, so the year of the recording date may not match the year of release. This is especially evident during the 1942–1944 musicians' strike, which started on July 31, 1942, and lasted through November 11, 1944, for the Columbia label. Striking musicians were prohibited from recording in the studio during this time, so the record labels released unissued recordings from their stockpiles, or they re-issued recordings from previous years. A second musicians' strike lasted from January 1, 1948, through December 1948.

U.S. peak chart positions are from Joel Whitburn's Pop Memories 1890–1954: The History of American Popular Music. Chart dates shown are from the same source and are the date the song first charted. R&B chart positions are from MusicVF.com and Barry Kowal's HitsOfAllDecades.com. At the time of James's charts, Billboard magazine referred to the R&B chart as "The Harlem Hit Parade".

==== 10" 78 rpm singles, 1938 ====
Label	Date (Note: Dates in table are in YYYY-MM-DD format where available)	Catalog #	Matrix	Title	Peak chart position		
Label	Date	Catalog #	Matrix	Title	US	R&B	Date
Brunswick	1937-12-01	8035	B-22084-2	When We're Alone (Penthouse Serenade)	—	—	—
Brunswick	1937-12-01	8035	B-22086-2	Life Goes to a Party	—	—	—
Brunswick	1937-12-01	8038	B-22083-1	Jubilee (v. Helen Humes)	—	—	—
Brunswick	1937-12-01	8038	B-22085-1	I Can Dream, Can't I? (v. Helen Humes)	—	—	—
Brunswick	1938-01-05	8055	B-22251-1	It's the Dreamer in Me (v. Helen Humes)	9	—	1938-05-21
Brunswick	1938-01-05	8055	B-22252-1	One O'Clock Jump	7	—	1938-02-19
Brunswick	1938-01-05	8067	B-22249-1	Texas Chatter	—	—	—
Brunswick	1938-01-05	8067	B-22250-1	Song of the Wanderer (v. Helen Humes)	—	—	—
Brunswick	1938-04-27	8136	B-22808-2	Out of Nowhere	—	—	—
Brunswick	1938-04-27	8136	B-22810-1	Lullaby in Rhythm	—	—	—
Brunswick	1938-04-27	8178	B-22809-1	Wrap Your Troubles in Dreams (And Dream Your Troubles Away)	—	—	—
Brunswick	1938-04-27	8178	B-22811-1	Little White Lies	—	—	—

==== 10" 78 rpm singles, 1939 ====
Label	Date (Note: Dates in table are in YYYY-MM-DD format where available)	Catalog #	Matrix	Title	Peak chart position		
Label	Date	Catalog #	Matrix	Title	US	R&B	Date
Brunswick	1939-02-01	8318	B-24060-2	Boo-Woo	—	—	—
Brunswick	1939-02-01	8318	B-24061-2	Woo-Woo	—	—	—
Brunswick	1939-02-20	8326	B-24516-1	Blame It on My Last Affair (v. Beatrice Byres)	—	—	—
Brunswick	1939-02-20	8326	B-24517-1	Love's a Necessary Thing (v. Beatrice Byres)	—	—	—
Brunswick	1939-02-20	8327	B-24514-1	Ciribiribin	—	—	—
Brunswick	1939-02-20	8327	B-24515-1	Sweet Georgia Brown	—	—	—
Brunswick	1939-03-06	8337	B-24193-1	'Tain't What You Do (It's the Way That Cha Do It) (v. Jack Berg)	—	—	—
Brunswick	1939-03-06	8337	B-24194-1	Two O'Clock Jump	—	—	—
Brunswick	1939-02-01	8350	B-24062-1	Home James	—	—	—
Brunswick	1939-02-01	8350	B-24063-1	Jesse	—	—	—
Brunswick	1939-04-06	8355	B-24346-A	And the Angels Sing (v. Bernice Byres)	—	—	—
Brunswick	1939-04-06	8355	B-24348-A	Got No Time (v. Bernice Byres)	—	—	—
Brunswick	1939-04-06	8366	B-24347-C	Indiana	—	—	—
Brunswick	1939-04-06	8366	B-24349-3	King Porter Stomp	—	—	—
Brunswick	1939-05-24	8395	B-24689-A	Comes Love (v. Connie Haines)	—	—	—
Brunswick	1939-05-24	8395	B-24690-A	I Can't Afford to Dream (v. Connie Haines)	—	—	—
Brunswick	1939-05-24	8406	B-24691-A	I Found a New Baby	14	—	1939-07-29
Brunswick	1939-05-24	8406	B-24692-A	Fannie May	—	—	—
Brunswick	1939-07-13	8443	B-25057-1	From the Bottom of My Heart (v. Frank Sinatra)	—	—	—
Brunswick	1939-07-13	8443	B-25059-1	Melancholy Mood (v. Frank Sinatra)	—	—	—
Columbia	1939-08-17	35209A	B-25213-1	Vol Vistu Gaily Star (v. Jack Palmer)	—	—	—
Columbia	1939-08-17	35209B	B-25215-1	It's Funny to Everyone but Me (v. Frank Sinatra)	—	—	—
Columbia	1939-09-17	35227	CO 25285	Here Comes the Night (v. Frank Sinatra)	—	—	—
Columbia	1939-09-17	35227	CO 25287	Feet Draggin' Blues	—	—	—
Columbia	1939-08-17	35242	B-25212	My Buddy (v. Frank Sinatra)	—	—	—
Columbia	1939-09-17	35242	CO 25286	Willow Weep for Me	—	—	—
Columbia	1939-10-13	35261	WC 2798	On a Little Street in Singapore (v. Frank Sinatra)	—	—	—
Columbia	1939-10-13	35261	WC 2799	Who Told You I Cared? (v. Frank Sinatra)	—	—	—
Columbia	1939-11-08	35316	LA 2046	Ciribiribin (v. Frank Sinatra)	10	—	1940-01-06
Columbia	1939-11-30	35316	LA 2048	Avalon	—	—	—
Columbia	1939-11-30	35340	LA 2051	Concerto for Trumpet	—	—	—
Columbia	1939-11-30	35340	LA 2053	I'm in the Market for You	—	—	—
Columbia	1939-11-30	35456	LA 2052	Night Special	—	—	—
Columbia	1939-11-30	35456	LA 2054	Back Beat Boogie	24	—	1944-04-01
Columbia	1939-11-08	35531	LA 2045	Cross Country Jump	—	—	—
Columbia	1939-11-08	35531	LA 2047	Every Day of My Life (v. Frank Sinatra)	—	—	—
Columbia	1939-09-17	35587	CO 25288	All or Nothing at All (v. Frank Sinatra)	1	8	1943-06-19
Columbia	1939-11-08	35587	LA 2044	Flash	19	10	1943-07-10

==== 10" 78 rpm singles, 1940 ====
Label	Date (Note: Dates in table are in YYYY-MM-DD format where available)	Catalog #	Matrix	Title	Peak chart position		
Label	Date	Catalog #	Matrix	Title	US	R&B	Date
Silvertone	1939-11-08	547	LA 2046	Ciribiribin	—	—	—
Silvertone	1939-11-30	547	LA 2048	Avalon	—	—	—
Varsity	1940-02	8194	US1361-1	Tuxedo Junction	—	—	—
Varsity	1940-02	8194	US1363-1	Palms of Paradise (v. Fran Heines)	—	—	—
Varsity	1940-02	8201	US1362-1	Alice Blue Gown	—	—	—
Varsity	1940-02	8201	US1360-1	Headin' for Hallelujah	—	—	—
Varsity	1940-03	8221	US1439-1	How High the Moon (v. Dick Haymes)	—	—	—
Varsity	1940-03	8221	US1436-1	You've Got Me Out on a Limb (v. Dick Haymes)	—	—	—
Varsity	1940-03	8231	US1440-2	Carnival of Venice	—	—	—
Varsity	1940-03	8231	US1437-1	Hodge Podge	—	—	—
Varsity	1940-04	8264	US1561	Fools Rush In (v. Dick Haymes)	—	—	—
Varsity	1940-04	8264	US1562	Secrets in the Moonlight (v. Dick Haymes)	—	—	—
Varsity	1940-04	8270	US1559-1	Boog It	—	—	—
Varsity	1940-04	8270	US1560-1	The Sheik of Araby	—	—	—
Varsity	1940-05	8293	US1644-1	Mister Meadowlark (v. Dick Haymes)	—	—	—
Varsity	1940-05	8293	US1645-1	The Nearness of You (v. Dick Haymes)	—	—	—
Varsity	1940-05	8298A	US1646-1	Four or Five Times	—	—	—
Varsity	1940-05	8298B	US1643-1	Flight of the Bumble Bee	20	—	1940-06-08
Varsity	1940-06	8349	US1805-1	It's the Last Time I'll Fall in Love (v. Dick Haymes)	—	—	—
Varsity	1940-06	8349	US1807-1	Orchids for Remembrance (v. Dick Haymes)	—	—	—
Varsity	1940-06	8353	US1806-1	One Look at You (v. Dick Haymes)	—	—	—
Varsity	1940-06	8353	US1808-1	Maybe (v. Dick Haymes)	—	—	—
Varsity	1940-07	8382	US1892-1	A Million Dreams Ago (v. Dick Haymes)	—	—	—
Varsity	1940-07	8382	US1888-1	I Wouldn't Take a Million (v. Dick Haymes)	—	—	—
Varsity	1940-07	8389	US1889-2	My Greatest Mistake (v. Dick Haymes)	—	—	—
Varsity	1940-07	8389	US1887-1	The Moon Won't Talk (v. Dick Haymes)	—	—	—
Varsity	1940-03	8404	US1438-1	Come and Get It	—	—	—
Varsity	1940-07	8404	US1890	Swanee River	—	—	—
Varsity	1940-07	8411	US1891	Exactly Like You	—	—	—
Varsity	1940-07	8411	US1886-1	Tempo De Luxe	—	—	—
Varsity	1940-05	8419	US1647	Superchief	—	—	—
Montgomery; Ward	1940-04	10001	US1561	Fools Rush In (v. Dick Haymes)	—	—	—
Montgomery; Ward	1940-04	10001	US1562	Secrets in the Moonlight (v. Dick Haymes)	—	—	—
Montgomery; Ward	1940-04	10002	US1559-1	Boog It	—	—	—
Montgomery; Ward	1940-04	10002	US1560-1	The Sheik of Araby	—	—	—
Montgomery; Ward	1940-03	10003	US1440-2	Carnival of Venice	—	—	—
Montgomery; Ward	1940-03	10003	US1437-1	Hodge Podge	—	—	—
Montgomery; Ward	1940-03	10004	US1439-1	How High the Moon (v. Dick Haymes)	—	—	—
Montgomery; Ward	1940-03	10004	US1436-1	You've Got Me Out on a Limb (v. Dick Haymes)	—	—	—
Montgomery; Ward	1940-02	10005	US1362-1	Alice Blue Gown	—	—	—
Montgomery; Ward	1940-02	10005	US1360-1	Headin' for Hallelujah	—	—	—
Montgomery; Ward	1940-02	10006	US1361-1	Tuxedo Junction	—	—	—
Montgomery; Ward	1940-02	10006	US1363-1	Palms of Paradise	—	—	—

==== 10" 78 rpm singles, 1941 ====
Label	Date (Note: Dates in table are in YYYY-MM-DD format where available)	Catalog #	Matrix	Title	Peak chart position		
Label	Date	Catalog #	Matrix	Title	US	R&B	Date
Silvertone	1941-01-08	586	CO29423	Music Makers	—	—	—
Silvertone	1941-01-08	586	CO29421	Montevideo (v. Dick Haymes)	—	—	—
Columbia	1941-01-08	35932	CO29423	Music Makers	9	—	1941-04-05
Columbia	1941-01-08	35932	CO29421	Montevideo (v. Dick Haymes)	—	—	—
Columbia	1941-01-08	35947	CO29420	I Never Purposely Hurt You (v. Dick Haymes)	—	—	—
Columbia	1941-01-08	35947	CO29422	Flatbush Flanagan	—	—	—
Columbia	1941-01-22	35979	CO29544	A Little Bit of Heaven	—	—	—
Columbia	1941-01-29	35979	CO29586	Eli, Eli	—	—	—
Columbia	1941-02-13	36004	CO29727	The Carnival of Venice	—	—	—
Columbia	1941-02-13	36004	CO29726	The Flight of the Bumble Bee	—	—	—
Columbia	1941-01-22	36023	CO29545	Answer Man	—	—	—
Columbia	1941-01-22	36023	CO29543	Ol' Man River (v. Dick Haymes)	—	—	—
Columbia	1941-03-26	36069	CO30057	Walkin' by the River (v. Dick Haymes)	—	—	—
Columbia	1941-04-07	36069	CO30142	Dolores (v. Dick Haymes)	—	—	—
Columbia	1941-03-26	36081	CO30058	Braggin' (v. Dick Haymes)	—	—	—
Columbia	1941-04-07	36081	CO30194	For Want of a Star (v. Dick Haymes)	—	—	—
Columbia	1941-01-22	36146	CO29542	La Paloma	—	—	—
Columbia	1941-04-28	36146	CO30330-1	Don't Cry, Cherie (v. Dick Haymes)	—	—	—
Columbia	1941-03-26	36160	CO30056-1	Trumpet Rhapsody (Part I)	18	—	1941-10-18
Columbia	1941-02-13	36160	CO29729-3	Trumpet Rhapsody (Part II)	—	—	—
Columbia	1941-05-20	36171	CO30508-1	Aurora (v. Dick Haymes)	—	—	—
Columbia	1941-05-20	36171	CO30507-1	Daddy (v. Helen Ward)	—	—	—
Columbia	1941-04-28	36190	CO30331-1	Jeffrie's Blues	—	—	—
Columbia	1941-04-28	36190	CO30332-1	Sharp as a Tack	—	—	—
Columbia	1941-06-10	36222	CO30627-2	Lament to Love (v. Dick Haymes)	10	—	1941-08-30
Columbia	1941-06-10	36222	CO30628-1	Dodgers' Fan Dance	—	—	—
Columbia	1939-03-06	36232	BW-24194-1	Two O'Clock Jump	19	—	1943-06-26
Columbia	1938-01-05	36232	B22252-2	One O'Clock Jump	—	—	—
Columbia	1941-06-30	36246	CO30806-1	Yes Indeed! (v. Dick Haymes)	—	—	—
Columbia	1941-06-30	36246	CO30807	It's So Peaceful in the Country (v. Dick Haymes)	—	—	—
Columbia	1941-06-30	36255	CO30805	I Guess I'll Have to Dream the Rest (v. Dick Haymes)	—	—	—
Columbia	1941-06-30	36255	CO30808	I'll Never Let a Day Pass By (v. Dick Haymes)	—	—	—
Columbia	1941-06-10	36285	CO30641	Lost in Love (v. Dick Haymes)	—	—	—
Columbia	1941-04-07	36285	CO30195	I'll Get By (v. Dick Haymes)	—	—	—
Columbia	1941-05-20	36296	CO30509-1	You Made Me Love You (I Didn't Want to Do It) [Grammy Hall of Fame, 2010]	5	—	1941-11-01
Columbia	1941-06-10	36296	CO30642-1	A Sinner Kissed an Angel (v. Dick Haymes)	15	—	1941-12-13
Columbia	1941-08-04	36339	CO30996-1	Don't Take Your Love from Me (v. Lynn Richards)	—	—	—
Columbia	1941-03-26	36339	CO30059	Duke's Mixture	—	—	—
Columbia	1941-09-08	36390	CO31253	Misirlou	22	—	1941-11-15
Columbia	1941-09-08	36390	CO31251	Minka (v. Dick Haymes)	—	—	—
Columbia	1941-09-08	36399	CO31252-2	Nothin'	—	—	—
Columbia	1941-06-30	36399	CO30750-1	Record Session	—	—	—
Columbia	1941-10-06	36412	CO31409-1	You've Changed (v. Dick Haymes)	—	—	—
Columbia	1941-08-04	36412	CO30997-3	Nobody Knows the Trouble I've Seen	—	—	—
Columbia	1941-09-08	36430	CO31250	Rancho Pillow (v. Dick Haymes)	—	—	—
Columbia	1941-10-06	36430	CO31411-3	The Man with the Lollypop Song (v. Dick Haymes)	—	—	—
Columbia	1941-05-20	36434	CO30510-1	My Silent Love (v. Dick Haymes)	—	—	—
Columbia	1941-10-06	36434	CO31410-1	My Melancholy Baby	—	—	—
Columbia	1941-10-29	36446	CO31618	Make Love to Me (v. Helen Forrest)	—	—	—
Columbia	1941-10-29	36446	CO31617	You Don't Know What Love Is (v. Dick Haymes)	—	—	—
Columbia	1941-10-29	36455	CO31615-1	He's 1-A in the Army and He's A-1 in My Heart (v. Helen Forrest)	—	—	—
Columbia	1941-10-29	36455	CO31619	Day Dreaming (v. Dick Haymes)	—	—	—
Columbia	1941-10-29	36466	CO31616-1	Wait Till the Sun Shines, Nellie (v. Dalton Rizzotto)	—	—	—
Columbia	1941-10-29	36466	CO31614-1	The Devil Sat Down and Cried (v. H. Forrest, D. Haymes, H. James)	23	—	1942-02-14

==== 10" 78 rpm singles, 1942 ====
Label	Date (Note: Dates in table are in YYYY-MM-DD format where available)	Catalog #	Matrix	Title	Peak chart position		
Label	Date	Catalog #	Matrix	Title	US	R&B	Date
Columbia	1941-12-11	36478	CO31954	I Don't Want to Walk Without You (v. Helen Forrest)	1	—	1942-02-28
Columbia	1941-12-11	36478	CO31955	B-19	—	—	—
Columbia	1941-12-11	36487	CO31952-1	J P Dooley III (v. H. Forrest, H. James, D. Rizzotto)	—	—	—
Columbia	1941-05-20	36487	CO30519-2	Jughead	—	—	—
Columbia	1941-12-30	36500	CO32070	All for Love (v. Jimmy Saunders)	—	—	—
Columbia	1941-12-30	36500	CO32072-1	Blues in the Night	—	—	—
Columbia	1942-01-29	36518	CO32345-1	I Remember You (v. Helen Forrest)	24	—	1942-05-16
Columbia	1942-01-29	36518	CO32346-1	Last Night I Said a Prayer (v. Jimmy Saunders)	—	—	—
Columbia	1942-01-29	36533	CO32347-1	Skylark (v. Helen Forrest)	11	—	1942-05-02
Columbia	1942-01-29	36533	CO32348-1	The Clipper	—	—	—
Columbia	1942-02-24	36545	CO32474-1	Easter Parade	11	—	1942-04-04
Columbia	1942-02-24	36545	CO32474-1	Easter Parade	23	—	1946-04-27
Columbia	1942-02-24	36545	CO32475-1	Crazy Rhythm	—	—	—
Columbia	1942-02-24	36549	CO32473-1	Trumpet Blues (And Cantabile) [Grammy Hall of Fame, 1999]	—	—	—
Columbia	1942-02-24	36549	CO32472-1	Sleepy Lagoon	1	—	1942-04-18
Columbia	1942-03-19	36566	CO32618	You're Too Good for Good-for-Nothing Me (v. Helen Forrest)	—	—	—
Columbia	1942-03-19	36566	CO32616	One Dozen Roses (v. Jimmy Saunders)	4	—	1942-05-23
Columbia	1941-12-30	36579	CO32073-1	Strictly Instrumental	5	—	1942-07-18
Columbia	1942-03-19	36579	CO32617-1	When You're a Long Way from Home (v. Jimmy Saunders)	—	—	—
Columbia	1941-12-30	36599	CO32071-2	The Mole	—	—	—
Columbia	1941-12-30	36599	CO32074-1	But Not for Me (v. Helen Forrest)	12	—	1942-08-08
Columbia	1942-06-05	36614	HCO827-1	He's My Guy (v. Helen Forrest)	7	—	1942-09-05
Columbia	1942-06-05	36614	HCO825-1	You're in Love with Someone Else (v. Helen Forrest)	—	—	—
Columbia	1942-06-05	36623	HCO828-1	I Cried for You (v. Helen Forrest)	19	—	1942-09-05
Columbia	1942-06-05	36623	HCO829-1	Let Me Up	—	—	—
Columbia	1942-07-23	36644	HCO868	Daybreak (v. Johnny McAfee)	17	—	1942-12-12
Columbia	1942-07-18	36644	HCO854	Manhattan Serenade (v. Helen Forrest)	9	—	1942-11-21
Columbia	1942-07-31	36650	HCO911-1	Mr. Five by Five (v. Helen Forrest)	1	—	1942-11-14
Columbia	1942-06-05	36650	HCO830-1	That Soldier of Mine (v. Helen Forrest)	—	—	—
Columbia	1942-07-23	36659	HCO866-1	A Poem Set to Music (v. Johnny McAfee)	—	—	—
Columbia	1942-07-23	36659	HCO867-1	I Had the Craziest Dream (v. Helen Forrest)	1	4	1942-11-21
Elite	1940-06	5027	US1805-1	It's the Last Time I'll Fall in Love (v. Dick Haymes)	—	—	—
Elite	1940-03	5027	US1438-1	Come and Get It	—	—	—
Elite	1940-05	5028	US1646-1	Four or Five Times	—	—	—
Elite	1940-03	5028	US1437-1	Hodge Podge	—	—	—
Elite	1940-05	5031	US1643-1	Flight of the Bumble Bee	—	—	—
Elite	1940-03	5031	US1440-2	Carnival of Venice	—	—	—
Elite	1940-06	5034	US1808-1	Maybe (v. Dick Haymes)	—	—	—
Elite	1940-02	5034	US1360-1	Headin' for Hallelujah	—	—	—
Elite	1940-04	5036 & X34	US1560-2	Sheik of Araby	—	—	—
Elite	1940-07	5036 & X34	US1891-2	Exactly Like You	—	—	—
Elite	1940-06	5042	US1806-1	One Look at You (v. Dick Haymes)	—	—	—
Elite	1940-02	5045	US1362-1	Alice Blue Gown	—	—	—
Elite	1940-05	5045	US1647-1	Super Chief	—	—	—
Elite	1940-07	X32	1890	Swanee River	—	—	—
Elite	1940-02	X32	1362	Alice Blue Gown	—	—	—

==== 10" 78 rpm singles, 1943 ====
Label	Date (Note: Dates in table are in YYYY-MM-DD format where available)	Catalog #	Matrix	Title	Peak chart position		
Label	Date	Catalog #	Matrix	Title	US	R&B	Date
Columbia	1942-07-18	36668	HCO852-1	Moonlight Becomes You (v. Johnny McAfee)	15	—	1943-01-16
Columbia	1942-07-31	36668	HCO912-1	I've Heard That Song Before (v. Helen Forrest)	1	1	1943-01-16
Columbia	1942-07-31	36672	HCO914-1	Velvet Moon	2	6	1943-04-10
Columbia	1942-07-22	36672	HCO863-1	Prince Charming	13	—	1943-04-17
Columbia	1942-06-05	36677	HCO826-1	James Session	—	—	—
Columbia	1942-07-18	36677	HCO853-1	I Heard You Cried Last Night (v. Helen Forrest)	2	—	1943-07-24
Columbia	1942-07-22	36683	HCO862-1	Cherry	4	10	1944-01-08
Columbia	1942-07-31	36683	HCO865-2	Jump Town	21	9	1943-12-18
The Hit Record	1940-05	7064	US1643	Flight of the Bumble Bee	—	—	—
The Hit Record	1940-07	7064	US1889-2	My Greatest Mistake (v. Dick Haymes)	—	—	—
The Hit Record	1940-03	7065	US1440	Carnival of Venice	—	—	—
The Hit Record	1940-07	7065	US1892	A Million Dreams Ago (v. Dick Haymes)	—	—	—
The Hit Record	1940-04	7066	US1561	Fools Rush In (v. Dick Haymes)	—	—	—
The Hit Record	1940-03	7066	US1437-1	Hodge Podge	—	—	—

==== 10" 78 rpm singles, 1944 ====
Label	Date (Note: Dates in table are in YYYY-MM-DD format where available)	Catalog #	Matrix	Title	Peak chart position		
Label	Date	Catalog #	Matrix	Title	US	R&B	Date
Columbia	1941-04-07	36698	CO30195-1	I'll Get By (v. Dick Haymes)	1	—	1944-04-15
Columbia	1941-01-08	36698	CO29422	Flatbush Flanagan	—	—	—
Columbia	1939-10-13	36700	WC2798	On a Little Street in Singapore (v. Frank Sinatra)	27	—	1944-05-13
Columbia	1939-11-08	36700	LA2047	Every Day of My Life (v. Frank Sinatra)	17	—	1944-05-27
Columbia	1939-10-13	36713	WC2800	Sleepy Time Gal	21	—	1944-08-05
Columbia	1942-07-31	36713	HCO913	Memphis Blues	15	—	1944-07-08
Columbia	1942-07-22	36729	HCO860-1	My Beloved Is Rugged (v. Helen Forrest)	—	—	—
Columbia	1942-03-19	36729	CO32619-1	Estrellita	12	—	1944-09-16
Columbia	1941-08-04	36738	CO30996	Don't Take Your Love from Me (v. Lynn Richards)	—	—	—
Columbia	1939-08-17	36738	B25215	It's Funny to Everyone but Me (v. Frank Sinatra)	21	—	1944-10-28
Continental	1940-07	C-3009	08-1890	Swanee River	—	—	—

==== 10" 78 rpm singles, 1945 ====
Label	Date (Note: Dates in table are in YYYY-MM-DD format where available)	Catalog #	Matrix	Title	Peak chart position		
Label	Date	Catalog #	Matrix	Title	US	R&B	Date
Columbia	1944-11-24	36758	HCO1126-1	I'm Beginning to See the Light (v. Kitty Kallen)	1	—	1945-01-27
Columbia	1944-11-24	36758	HCO1125-1	The Love I Long For (v. Buddy Di Vito)	—	—	—
Columbia	1944-11-24	36773	HCO1127	When Your Lover Has Gone	—	—	—
Columbia	1944-11-21	36773	HCO1138	I'm Confessin' (That I Love You)	—	—	—
Columbia	1945-01-18	36778	HCO1227-1	Guess I'll Hang My Tears Out to Dry (v. Kitty Kallen)	16	—	1945-04-14
Columbia	1945-01-18	36778	HCO1228	I Don't Care Who Knows It (v. Kitty Kallen)	8	—	1945-04-07
Columbia	1945-02-14	36788	HCO1273	Yah-Ta-Ta, Yah-Ta-Ta (v. Kitty Kallen)	11	—	1945-05-05
Columbia	1945-01-22	36788	HCO1236-1	All of My Life (v. Buddy Di Vito)	—	—	—
Columbia	1945-01-03	36794	HCO1200-2	I Wish I Knew (v. Kitty Kallen)	—	—	—
Columbia	1945-01-03	36794	HCO1201-1	The More I See You (v. Buddy Di Vito)	12	—	1945-05-26
Columbia	1945-04-25	36806	HCO1371-1	Oh, Brother! (v. Kitty Kallen)	—	—	—
Columbia	1945-04-25	36806	HCO1370	If I Loved You (v. Buddy Di Vito)	8	—	1945-07-28
Columbia	1945-02-14	36827	HCO1272	Carnival	—	—	—
Columbia	1945-01-22	36827	HCO1235-1	11:60 PM (v. Kitty Kallen)	8	—	1945-09-08
Columbia	1945-05-30	36833	HCO1411-1	Memphis in June	—	—	—
Columbia	1945-05-30	36833	HCO1409-2	I'll Buy That Dream (v. Kitty Kallen)	2	—	1945-09-22
Columbia	1945-07-24	36838	CO35081-1	It's Been a Long, Long Time (v. Kitty Kallen)	1	—	1945-10-13
Columbia	1945-07-24	36838	CO35082-1	Autumn Serenade	16	—	1945-11-03
Columbia	1945-08-20	36867	CO35107-1	Waitin' for the Train to Come in (v. Kitty Kallen)	6	—	1945-11-24
Columbia	1945-08-20	36867	CO35108-1	I Can't Begin to Tell You (v. Ruth Haag {Betty Grable})	5	—	1945-12-08
Columbia	1945-05-30	36887	HCO1412-2	9:20 Special	—	—	—
Columbia	1945-07-24	36887	CO35083-1	Ain't Misbehavin'	—	—	—

==== 10" 78 rpm singles, 1946 ====
Label	Date (Note: Dates in table are in YYYY-MM-DD format where available)	Catalog #	Matrix	Title	Peak chart position		
Label	Date	Catalog #	Matrix	Title	US	R&B	Date
Columbia	1945-11-07	36899	HCO1594-1	Baby What You Do to Me (v. Kitty Kallen)	—	—	—
Columbia	1945-11-07	36899	HCO1593-1	I'm Always Chasing Rainbows (v. Buddy Di Vito)	9	—	1946-02-02
Columbia	1945-08-07	36933	CO35098-1	The Wonder of You (v. Kitty Kallen)	—	—	—
Columbia	1945-12-18	36933	HCO1627-1	I'm in Love with Two Sweethearts (v. Buddy Di Vito)	—	—	—
Columbia	1946-02-20	36965	HCO1728-1	As If I Didn't Have Enough on My Mind (v. Buddy Di Vito)	—	—	—
Columbia	1946-02-20	36965	HCO1726-1	Do You Love Me (v. Ginnie Powell)	15	—	1946-06-29
Columbia	1945-12-19	36973	HCO1630	Who's Sorry Now (v. Willie Smith)	18	—	1946-06-08
Columbia	1946-02-20	36973	HCO1727	I Didn't Mean a Word I Said (v. Buddy Di Vito)	—	—	—
Columbia	1946-02-20	36996	HCO1729	Easy	—	—	—
Columbia	1945-12-19	36996	HCO1629	Friar Rock	—	—	—
Columbia	1946-05-27	37052	HCO1827-1	I've Never Forgotten (v. Ginnie Powell)	—	—	—
Columbia	1946-05-22	37052	HCO1826-1	This Is Always (v. Buddy Di Vito)	10	—	1946-09-28
Columbia	1946-02-22	37060	HCO1828	And Then It's Heaven (v. Buddy Di Vito)	13	—	1946-09-21
Columbia	1946-05-27	37060	HCO1844	I Guess I Expected Too Much (v. Buddy Di Vito)	—	—	—
Columbia	1946-05-27	37080	HCO1845-1	Why Does It Get So Late So Early (v. Buddy Di Vito)	—	—	—
Columbia	1945-12-19	37080	HCO1631-1	The Beaumont Ride	—	—	—
Columbia	1946-09-13	37148	HCO2025-1	One More Kiss (v. Willie Smith)	—	—	—
Columbia	1946-08-26	37148	HCO1973	If I'm Lucky (v. Marion Morgan)	—	—	—
Columbia	1946-09-13	37156	HCO2027	Life Can Be Beautiful (v. Marion Morgan)	—	—	—
Columbia	1946-09-13	37156	HCO2026	Oh, But I Do (v. Buddy Di Vito)	12	—	1947-01-25
Davis	1940-04	9000	US 1560	The Sheik of Araby	—	—	—
Davis	1940-03	9000	US 1438	Come and Get It	—	—	—

==== 10" 78 rpm singles, 1947 ====
Label	Date (Note: Dates in table are in YYYY-MM-DD format where available)	Catalog #	Matrix	Title	Peak chart position		
Label	Date	Catalog #	Matrix	Title	US	R&B	Date
Columbia	1946-11-13	37218	HCO2146	The Man with the Horn	—	—	—
Columbia	1946-11-13	37218	HCO2148	Jalousie (Jealousy)	17	—	1947-04-05
Columbia	1946-09-13	37264	HCO2028-1	Keb-Lah	—	—	—
Columbia	1946-10-22	37264	HCO2115-1	You'll Never Know	—	—	—
Columbia	1947-02-16	37301	HCO2233	What Am I Gonna Do About You (v. Art Lund)	—	—	—
Columbia	1947-02-17	37301	HCO2235	I Can't Get Up the Nerve to Kiss You (v. Art Lund)	—	—	—
Columbia	1947-02-16	37305	HCO2232	Heartaches (v. Marion Morgan)	4	—	1947-04-05
Columbia	1947-02-16	37305	HCO2230	I Tipped My Hat and Slowly Rode Away (v. Art Lund)	21	—	1947-05-03
Columbia	1947-02-17	37323	HCO2234-1	Stella By Starlight	21	—	1947-05-10
Columbia	1947-02-16	37323	HCO2231-1	As Long as I'm Dreaming (v. Marion Morgan)	—	—	—
Columbia	1946-11-11	37351	HCO2138	Moten Swing, Part 1	—	—	—
Columbia	1946-11-11	37351	HCO2139	Moten Swing, Part 2	—	—	—
Columbia	1947-04-09	37388	HCO2294	Something for Nothing (v. Pat Flaherty)	—	—	—
Columbia	1947-04-09	37388	HCO2295	Tomorrow (v. Tiny Timbrell)	—	—	—
Columbia	1942-07-22	37520	HCO863	Prince Charming	—	—	—
Columbia	1939-08-17	37520	B25212	My Buddy (v. F Sinatra)	—	—	—
Columbia	1941-12-11	37521	CO31954	I Don't Want to Walk Without You (v. Helen Forrest)	—	—	—
Columbia	1942-07-31	37521	HCO912	I've Heard That Song Before (v. Helen Forrest)	—	—	—
Columbia	1947-06-22	37588	HCO2401	Forgiving You (v. Buddy Di Vito)	—	—	—
Columbia	1947-06-22	37588	HCO2402	Love and the Weather (v. Marion Morgan)	—	—	—
Columbia	1947-06-24	37810	HCO2410	Strange What a Song Can Do (v. Marion Morgan)	—	—	—
Columbia	1947-06-25	37810	HCO2415	My Friend Irma (v. Marion Morgan)	—	—	—
Columbia	1947-06-24	37851	HCO2409	Too Marvelous for Words (v. Buddy Di Vito)	—	—	—
Columbia	1947-06-25	37851	HCO2414	My Future Just Passed (v. Marion Morgan)	—	—	—
Columbia	1947-08-24	37929	HCO2562	I Still Get Jealous (v. Buddy Di Vito)	23	—	1947-11-08
Columbia	1947-08-24	37929	HCO2561	Sentimental Souvenirs (v. Marion Morgan)	—	—	—
Columbia	1946-10-22	37955	HCO2114	White Christmas (v. Marion Morgan)	—	—	—
Columbia	1947-08-24	37955	HCO2563	All the World Is Mine	—	—	—

==== 10" 78 rpm singles, 1948 ====
Label	Date (Note: Dates in table are in YYYY-MM-DD format where available)	Catalog #	Matrix	Title	Peak chart position		
Label	Date	Catalog #	Matrix	Title	US	R&B	Date
Columbia	1947-11-16	38039	HCO2772	Lone Star Moon (v. Willie Smith)	—	—	—
Columbia	1947-11-16	38039	HCO2771	Forever Amber (v. Marion Morgan)	—	—	—
Columbia	1947-06-22	38059	HCO2403	East Coast Blues	—	—	—
Columbia	1947-11-06	38059	HCO2758	I Understand (v. Buddy DiVito)	—	—	—
Columbia	1947-12-22	38134	HCO3027	Beyond the Sea (v. Marion Morgan)	—	—	—
Columbia	1947-12-20	38134	HCO3022	All the Way	—	—	—
Columbia	1947-12-30	38152	HCO3097	You Can't Run Away from Love (v. Marion Morgan)	—	—	—
Columbia	1947-12-27	38152	HCO3065	Nina (Neenya)	—	—	—
Columbia	1947-12-22	38156	HCO3029	Love of My Life (v. Marion Morgan)	—	—	—
Columbia	1947-12-27	38156	HCO3064	You Can Do No Wrong (v. Marion Morgan & Vinni De Campo)	—	—	—
Columbia	1942-02-24	38199	CO32473-1	Trumpet Blues (and Cantabile)	—	—	—
Columbia	1941-02-13	38199	CO29727-1	The Carnival of Venice	—	—	—
Columbia	1947-11-03	38231	HCO2748	Hankerin' (v. Marion Morgan)	—	—	—
Columbia	1947-12-20	38231	HCO3021	I Don't Care If It Rains All Night (v. Marion Morgan)	—	—	—
Columbia	1947-12-27	38245	HCO3063-1	Ev'ry Day I Love You (Just a Little Bit More) (v. Marion Morgan)	—	—	—
Columbia	1947-12-20	38245	HCO3020	There's Music in the Land (v. Marion Morgan)	—	—	—
Columbia	1947-11-06	38268	HCO2759	Ab-Mur	—	—	—
Columbia	1947-12-23	38268	HCO3036	Ah, But It Happens (v. Vinni De Campo)	—	—	—
Columbia	1947-11-06	38300	HCO2759	Ab-Mur	—	—	—
Columbia	1947-11-06	38300	HCO2760	September Song	—	—	—
Columbia	1947-12-29	38342	HCO3077	What Did I Do (v. Marion Morgan)	—	—	—
Columbia	1947-12-23	38342	HCO3036	Ah, But It Happens (v. Vinni De Campo)	—	—	—
Columbia	1947-11-03	38350	HCO2750	Redigal Jump	—	—	—
Columbia	1947-12-19	38380	HCO3011-1	Love (Your Spell Is Everywhere) (v. Marion Morgan)	—	—	—
Columbia	1947-11-03	38380	HCO2750-1	Redigal Jump	—	—	—

==== 10" 78 rpm and 7" 33 rpm singles, 1949 ====
Label	Date (Note: Dates in table are in YYYY-MM-DD format where available)	Catalog # 10" 78 rpm	Catalog # 7" 33 rpm	Matrix	Title	Peak chart position		
Label	Date	Catalog # 10" 78 rpm	Catalog # 7" 33 rpm	Matrix	Title	US	R&B	Date
Columbia	1949-02-14	38428	1-160	HCO3580	Hurry Hurry Hurry (v. The Skylarks)	—	—	—
Columbia	1949-02-14	38428	1-160	HCO3581	Don't Cry, Cry Baby (v. The Skylarks)	—	—	—
Columbia	1947-12-22	38476	1-213	HCO3028	Summer Moon (v. Vinni De Campo)	—	—	—
Columbia	1947-12-23	38476	1-213	HCO3037	Hatsville, U.S.A. (v. Willie Smith)	—	—	—
Columbia	1947-11-03	38526	1-279	HCO2746	Tuxedo Junction, Part 1	—	—	—
Columbia	1947-11-03	38526	1-279	HCO2747	Tuxedo Junction, Part 2	—	—	—
Columbia	1949-07-19	38557	1-317	HCO3850-1	Ultra	—	—	—
Columbia	1947-11-03	38557	1-317	HCO2749-1	Someone Loves Someone (v. Marion Morgan)	—	—	—
Columbia	1941-10-29	38586	1-340	CO31617	You Don't Know What Love Is (v. Dick Haymes)	—	—	—
Columbia	1941-10-29	38586	1-340	CO31618	Make Love to Me (v. Helen Forrest)	—	—	—

==== 10" 78 rpm and 7" 33 rpm singles, 1950 ====
Label	Date (Note: Dates in table are in YYYY-MM-DD format where available)	Catalog # 10" 78 rpm	Catalog # 7" 33 rpm	Matrix	Title	Peak chart position		
Label	Date	Catalog # 10" 78 rpm	Catalog # 7" 33 rpm	Matrix	Title	US	R&B	Date
Columbia	1949-12-12	38682	1-466	RHCO 3974	Doncha Go ‘Way Mad (v. The Skylarks)	—	—	—
Columbia	1949-12-12	38682	1-466	RHCO 3972	Truly (v. The Skylarks)	—	—	—
Columbia	1949-12-28	38699	1-481	HCO3980	Dream a Little Longer (v. Dick Williams & The Skylarks)	—	—	—
Columbia	1949-12-05	38699	1-481	HCO3962	Be Mine (v. The Skylarks)	—	—	—
Columbia	1939-02-20		1-509	ZLP 2059	Ciribiribin (They're So in Love)	—	—	—
Columbia	1942-02-24		1-509	ZLP 2060	Sleepy Lagoon	—	—	—
Columbia	1938-01-05	(see 1941)	1-510	ZLP 2061	One O'Clock Jump	—	—	—
Columbia	1939-03-06	(see 1941)	1-510	ZLP 2062	Two O'Clock Jump	—	—	—
Columbia	1946-11-13?	39108	1-513	ZLP 2067	Jalousie (Jealousy)	—	—	—
Columbia	1941-05-20?	39108	1-513	ZLP 2068	You Made Me Love You	—	—	—
Columbia	1949-12-28	38717	1-542	HCO3979	My Baby Is Blue (v. Dick Williams)	—	—	—
Columbia	1949-12-05	38717	1-542	HCO3961	You're a Sweetheart (v. The Skylarks)	—	—	—
Columbia	1950-03-02	38768	1-588	HCO4022	Mona Lisa (v. Dick Williams)	14	—	1950-08-05
Columbia	1950-03-02	38768	1-588	HCO4023	La Vie En Rose (v. Dick Williams)	—	—	—
Columbia	1949-12-28	38902	1-731	HCO3981	In a Mist	—	—	—
Columbia	1950-06-19	38902	1-731	CO43944	Brazilian Sleigh Bells	—	—	—
Columbia	1946-11-13	38943	1-771	HCO2149	Moonglow	—	—	—
Columbia	1950-07-24	38943	1-771	HCO4160	Show Me the Way to Get Out of This World (v. Dick Williams)	—	—	—
Columbia	1950-09-11	39009	1-839	HCO4242	I'll Know (v. Dick Williams)	—	—	—
Columbia	1950-09-11	39009	1-839	HCO4241	Guys and Dolls (v. Dick Williams & Jan Stewart)	—	—	—
Columbia	1950-09-01	39024	1-847	HCO4239	Lullaby in Boogie (v. Dick Williams & Jan Stewart)	—	—	—
Columbia	1950-09-01	39024	1-847	HCO4240	Circus Days	—	—	—
Columbia	1950-07-24	39083	1-940	HCO4161	Out of the Dark	—	—	—
Columbia	1950-09-11	39083	1-940	HCO4253	Can't Wait (v. Dick Williams)	—	—	—

==== 10" 78 rpm and 7" 45 rpm singles, 1951 ====
Label	Date (Note: Dates in table are in YYYY-MM-DD format where available)	Catalog # 10" 78 rpm	Catalog # 7" 45 rpm	Matrix	Title	Peak chart position		
Label	Date	Catalog # 10" 78 rpm	Catalog # 7" 45 rpm	Matrix	Title	US	R&B	Date
Columbia	1941-05-20	(see 1941)	4-36434	ZSP 6245	My Silent Love (v. Dick Haymes)	—	—	—
Columbia	1941-10-06	(see 1941)	4-36434	ZSP 6509	My Melancholy Baby	—	—	—
Columbia	1941-04-07	(see 1944)	4-36698	ZSP 6244	I'll Get By (As Long as I Have You) (v. Dick Haymes)	—	—	—
Columbia	1941-01-08	(see 1944)	4-36698	ZSP 6510	Flatbush Flanagan	—	—	—
Columbia	1951-01-05	39159	4-39159	HCO4413	Would I Love You (v. Doris Day)	10	—	1951-03-10
Columbia	1951-01-05	39159	4-39159	HCO4412	Lullaby of Broadway (v. Doris Day)	—	—	—
Columbia	1950-06-19	39289	4-39289	CO43945	Theme for Cynthia	—	—	—
Columbia	1951-01-05	39289	4-39289	HCO4415	Moon of Manakoora	—	—	—
Columbia	1951-04-11	39390	4-39390	HCO4465	Baby Blues (v. Toni Harper)	—	—	—
Columbia	1951-04-11	39390	4-39390	HCO4466	Peculiar Kind of Feeling (v. Toni Harper)	—	—	—
Columbia	1951-04-11	39419	4-39419	HCO4467	Tango Blues	—	—	—
Columbia	1951-01-05	39419	4-39419	HCO4414	When the Sun Comes Out	—	—	—
Columbia	1951-06-28	39495	4-39495	HCO4529	Dreamy Melody (v. The Skylarks)	—	—	—
Columbia	1951-06-28	39495	4-39495	HCO4530	You Blew Out the Flame (v. The Skylarks)	—	—	—
Columbia	1951-07-19	39527	4-39527	HCO4561-1	Castle Rock (v. Frank Sinatra)	8	—	1951-09-10
Columbia	1951-07-19	39527	4-39527	HCO4563-1	Deep Night (v. Frank Sinatra)	—	—	—
Columbia	1951-06-28	39582	4-39582	HCO4531	How Dry I Am Blues	—	—	—
Columbia	1951-09-11	39582	4-39582	HCO4598	Don't Be That Way	—	—	—

==== 10" 78 rpm and 7" 45 rpm singles, 1952 ====
Label	Date (Note: Dates in table are in YYYY-MM-DD format where available)	Catalog # 10" 78 rpm	Catalog # 7" 45 rpm	Matrix	Title	Peak chart position		
Label	Date	Catalog # 10" 78 rpm	Catalog # 7" 45 rpm	Matrix	Title	US	R&B	Date
Columbia	1952-01-22	39671	4-39671	HCO10100	Blacksmith Blues (v. Toni Harper)	—	—	—
Columbia	1952-01-22	39671	4-39671	HCO10101	Don't Send Me Home (v. Toni Harper)	—	—	—
Columbia	1951-11-07	39678	4-39678	HCO10026	The Brave Bulls (La Virgen De La Macarena)	—	—	—
Columbia	1951-11-07	39678	4-39678	HCO10027	Moanin' Low	—	—	—
Columbia	1952-03-12	39715	4-39715	HCO10147	To Be Loved By You (v. Kitty Kallen)	—	—	—
Columbia	1952-03-12	39715	4-39715	HCO10149	When I Dream I Always Dream of You (v. Kitty Kallen)	—	—	—
Columbia	1952-03-12	39765	4-39765	HCO10148	Like the Moon Above You (v. Kitty Kallen)	—	—	—
Columbia	1952-01-22	39765	4-39765	HCO10102	Roll 'Em	—	—	—
Columbia	1952-07-28	39846	4-39846	HCO10238	Melancholy Trumpet (v. Toni Harper)	—	—	—
Columbia	1952-07-28	39846	4-39846	HCO10250	Goin' Home (v. Jud Conlon's Rhythmaires)	—	—	—
Columbia	1952-07-28	39877	4-39877	HCO10241	Fruit Cake (v. Toni Harper)	—	—	—
Columbia	1952-07-28	39877	4-39877	HCO10242	Lovelight	—	—	—
Columbia	1952-05-23	39905	4-39905	HCO10167	You'll Never Know (v. Rosemary Clooney)	18	—	1953-01-10
Columbia	1952-05-26	39905	4-39905	HCO10171	The Continental (v. Rosemary Clooney)	—	—	—
Columbia	1946-11-13	(see 1947)	4-37218	ZSP 9692	The Man with the Horn	—	—	—
Columbia	1946-11-13	(see 1947)	4-37218	ZSP 9691	Jalousie (Jealousy)	—	—	—
Columbia	1947-11-06	(see 1948)	4-38300	ZSP 9700	Ab-Mur	—	—	—
Columbia	1947-11-06	(see 1948)	4-38300	ZSP 9699	September Song	—	—	—

==== 10" 78 rpm and 7" 45 rpm singles, 1953-1966 ====
Label	Release Year	Date (Note: Dates in table are in YYYY-MM-DD format where available)	Catalog # 10" 78 rpm	Catalog # 7" 45 rpm	Matrix	Title	Peak chart position		
Label	Release Year	Date	Catalog # 10" 78 rpm	Catalog # 7" 45 rpm	Matrix	Title	US	R&B	Date
Columbia	1953	1942-02-24	(see 1942)	4-36545	ZSP 7044	Crazy Rhythm	—	—	—
Columbia	1953	1942-02-24	(see 1942)	4-36545	?	Easter Parade	—	—	—
Columbia	1953	1953-04-06	39994	4-39994	HCO10472	Palladium Party	—	—	—
Columbia	1953	1953-04-06	39994	4-39994	HCO10473	Ruby	20	—	1953-07-11
Columbia	1953	1953-10-05	40113	4-40113	CCO5459	Theme from the Joe Louis Story	—	—	—
Columbia	1953	1953-10-05	40113	4-40113	CCO5460	Moonlighter Song	—	—	—
Columbia	1953	1953-10-05	40130	4-40130	CCO5458	Lush Life	—	—	—
Columbia	1953	1953-10-05	40130	4-40130	CCO5461	I Don't Think You Love Me Anymore (v. Jerry Vale)	—	—	—
Columbia	1954	1953-12-23	40199	4-40199	RHCO10768	Stomp and Whistle (v. Buddy Rich)	—	—	—
Columbia	1954	1953-12-28	40199	4-40199	RHCO10767	Ya' Better Stop	—	—	—
Columbia	1954	1954-06-18	40298	4-40298	CCO5517	High and the Mighty	—	—	—
Columbia	1954	1952-03-12	40298	4-40298	RHCO10150	Still You'd Break My Heart (v. Kitty Kallen)	—	—	—
Columbia	1954	1947-12-29 (remastered 1954)	—	4-PE 9	ZSP32590	Stompin' at The Savoy (Part 1)	—	—	—
Columbia	1954	1947-12-29 (remastered 1954)	—	4-PE 9	ZSP32592	Stompin' at The Savoy (Part 2)	—	—	—
Columbia	1954	1954-09-22	40354	4-40354	RHCO33224	The Touch	—	—	—
Columbia	1954	1954-09-24	40354	4-40354	HCO33231	Muskrat Ramble	—	—	—
Columbia	1955	1952-05-26	40496	4-40496	RHCO10173	It Might as Well Be Spring (v. Rosemary Clooney)	—	—	—
Columbia	1955	1952-05-23	40496	4-40496	RHCO10168	When You Wish Upon a Star (v. Rosemary Clooney)	—	—	—
Columbia	1955	1954-12-13	40503	4-40503	RHCO33284	Three for the Show	—	—	—
Columbia	1955	1954-12-13	40503	4-40503	RHCO33283	The Great Lie	—	—	—
Capitol	1957	1957-11-04	—	F3849	45-17777-13	Andrea	—	—	—
Capitol	1957	1957-11-04	—	F3849	45-17778-11	Vuelva	—	—	—
MGM	1959	1959-01	—	K12776	59-XY-13	Blue Baiao	—	—	—
MGM	1959	1959-01	—	K12776	59-XY-14	She's Got to Go (v. Ernie Andrews)	—	—	—
MGM	1959	1959-01	—	K12798	59-XY-17	Ballad for Beatniks	—	—	—
MGM	1959	1959-01	—	K12798	59-XY-18	The Blues About Manhattan	—	—	—
MGM	1959	1959-01	—	K12842	59-XY-15	Bess You Is My Woman	—	—	—
MGM	1959	1959-02	—	K12842	59-XY-81	Shiny Stockings	—	—	—
MGM	1960	1960-01	—	K12880	60-XY-8	Doodlin'	—	—	—
MGM	1960	1960-01	—	K12880	60-XY-9	I'll Take Care of Your Cares (v. Ray Sims)	—	—	—
MGM	1961	1960-02	—	K12983	60 XY-27	Jersey Bounce	—	—	—
MGM	1961	1960	—	K12983	60 XY-192	Theme from Orfeu Negro	—	—	—
MGM	1961	1961-01-23	—	K13022	61-XY-18-2	Sweets' Tooth	—	—	—
MGM	1961	1961-05-22	—	K13022	61-XY-72	Sunday Morning	—	—	—
MGM	1963	1963-03-11	—	K13173	63-XY-06	My Monday Date	—	—	—
MGM	1963	1963-03-12	—	K13173	63-XY-08	My Inspiration	—	—	—
Dot	1965	1965-04	—	45-16729	MB-19873	Green Onions - Part 1 and 2	—	—	—
Dot	1965	1965-04	—	45-16729	MB-19864	Love Theme from "In Harm's Way"	—	—	—
Dot	1966	1966-05/06	—	45-16944	MB-21230	San Antonio Rose	—	—	—
Dot	1966	1966-05/06	—	45-16944	MB-21234	Cimarron	—	—	—

==== 7" 45 rpm single reissues ====
Label	Year	Catalog #	Matrix	Title
Columbia Hall of Fame	1954	4-50001	ZSP 4117	One O'Clock Jump
Columbia Hall of Fame	1954	4-50001	ZSP 4118	Two O'Clock Jump
Columbia Hall of Fame	1954	4-50011	ZSP 31267	Ciribiribin (They're So in Love) (v. Frank Sinatra)
Columbia Hall of Fame	1954	4-50011	ZSP 4122	Concerto for Trumpet
Columbia Hall of Fame	1954	4-50015	ZSP 31272	Night Special
Columbia Hall of Fame	1954	4-50015	ZSP 7038	Back Beat Boogie
Columbia Hall of Fame	1954	4-50017	ZSP 4121	The Flight of the Bumble Bee
Columbia Hall of Fame	1954	4-50017	ZSP 31275	The Carnival of Venice
Columbia Hall of Fame	1954	4-50018	ZSP 6248	Trumpet Rhapsody (Part 1)
Columbia Hall of Fame	1954	4-50018	ZSP 6249	Trumpet Rhapsody (Part 2)
Columbia Hall of Fame	1954	4-50054	ZSP 13213	Easter Parade
Columbia Hall of Fame	1954	4-50054	ZSP 4119	You Made Me Love You
Columbia Hall of Fame	1954	4-50057	ZSP 35986	Trumpet Blues
Columbia Hall of Fame	1954	4-50057	RZSP 10026	The Brave Bulls
Columbia Hall of Fame	1954	4-50070	ZSP 9691	Jalousie (Jealousy)
Columbia Hall of Fame	1954	4-50070	ZSP 36264	Cherry
Gold-Mor	1973	GM 00001	ZSS 158581	Ciribiribin
Gold-Mor	1973	GM 00001	ZSS 158582	I'll Get By
Gold-Mor	1974	GM 00005	ZSS 159164	You Made Me Love You
Gold-Mor	1974	GM 00005	ZSS 159165	All or Nothing At All
Gold-Mor	1974	GM 00015	ZSS 159804	Sleepy Lagoon
Gold-Mor	1974	GM 00015	ZSS 159805	Two O'Clock Jump
Columbia Hall of Fame	1976	13-33307	ZSP 162032	Jalousie (Jealousy)
Columbia Hall of Fame	1976	13-33307	ZSP 162033	Cherry
Columbia Hall of Fame	1976	13-33308	ZSP 162034	Ciribiribin (They're So in Love)
Columbia Hall of Fame	1976	13-33308	ZSP 162035	The Mole
Columbia Hall of Fame	1976	13-33309	ZSP 162036	The Flight of the Bumble Bee
Columbia Hall of Fame	1976	13-33309	ZSP 162037	The Carnival of Venice
Columbia Hall of Fame	1976	13-33314	ZSP 16205?	Back Beat Boogie
Columbia Hall of Fame	1976	13-33314	ZSP 31272	Night Special

=== 10" 78 rpm and 7" 45 rpm box sets ===
Label	Box Title	Date	78 Catalog #	78 Disc #	78 Matrix	45 Catalog #	45 Disc #	45 Matrix	Track title
Philharmonic (Air Chief series)	Harry James, His Trumpet; And His Famous Orchestra	1942?	7387-5	FR-69 (-A)	1362	—	—	—	Alice Blue Gown
Philharmonic (Air Chief series)	Harry James, His Trumpet; And His Famous Orchestra	1942?	7387-5	FR-69 (-B)	1891	—	—	—	Exactly Like You
Philharmonic (Air Chief series)	Harry James, His Trumpet; And His Famous Orchestra	1942?	7387-5	FR-70 (-A)	1560	—	—	—	The Sheik of Araby
Philharmonic (Air Chief series)	Harry James, His Trumpet; And His Famous Orchestra	1942?	7387-5	FR-70 (-B)	1805	—	—	—	It's the Last Time I'll Fall in Love
Philharmonic (Air Chief series)	Harry James, His Trumpet; And His Famous Orchestra	1942?	7387-5	FR-71 (-A)	1437	—	—	—	Hodge Podge
Philharmonic (Air Chief series)	Harry James, His Trumpet; And His Famous Orchestra	1942?	7387-5	FR-71 (-B)	1646	—	—	—	Four or Five Times
Philharmonic (Air Chief series)	Harry James, His Trumpet; And His Famous Orchestra	1942?	7387-5	FR-72 (-A)	1440	—	—	—	The Carnival of Venice
Philharmonic (Air Chief series)	Harry James, His Trumpet; And His Famous Orchestra	1942?	7387-5	FR-72 (-B)	1643	—	—	—	Flight of the Bumble Bee
Davis	Davis Records Presents; Harry James and His Orchestra (No. 1)	1946	DA-13	DA-13 (-1)	1643	—	—	—	Flight of the Bumble Bee
Davis	Davis Records Presents; Harry James and His Orchestra (No. 1)	1946	DA-13	DA-13 (-2)	1440	—	—	—	The Carnival of Venice
Davis	Davis Records Presents; Harry James and His Orchestra (No. 1)	1946	DA-13	DA-13 (-3)	1361	—	—	—	Tuxedo Junction
Davis	Davis Records Presents; Harry James and His Orchestra (No. 1)	1946	DA-13	DA-13 (-4)	1437	—	—	—	Hodge Podge
Davis	Davis Records Presents; Harry James and His Orchestra (No. 1)	1946	DA-13	DA-13 (-5)	1891	—	—	—	Exactly Like You
Davis	Davis Records Presents; Harry James and His Orchestra (No. 1)	1946	DA-13	DA-13 (-6)	1890	—	—	—	Swanee River
Davis	Davis Records Presents; Harry James and His Orchestra (No. 1)	1946	DA-13	DA-13 (-7)	1362	—	—	—	Alice Blue Gown
Davis	Davis Records Presents; Harry James and His Orchestra (No. 1)	1946	DA-13	DA-13 (-8)	1646	—	—	—	Four or Five Times
Davis	Dick Haymes with Harry James and His Orchestra	1946	DA-14	DA-14 (-1)	1801	—	—	—	Maybe
Davis	Dick Haymes with Harry James and His Orchestra	1946	DA-14	DA-14 (-2)	1892	—	—	—	A Million Dreams Ago
Davis	Dick Haymes with Harry James and His Orchestra	1946	DA-14	DA-14 (-3)	1439	—	—	—	How High the Moon
Davis	Dick Haymes with Harry James and His Orchestra	1946	DA-14	DA-14 (-4)	1805	—	—	—	It's the Last Time I'll Fall in Love
Davis	Dick Haymes with Harry James and His Orchestra	1946	DA-14	DA-14 (-5)	1807	—	—	—	Orchids for Remembrance
Davis	Dick Haymes with Harry James and His Orchestra	1946	DA-14	DA-14 (-6)	1887	—	—	—	The Moon Won't Talk
Davis	Dick Haymes with Harry James and His Orchestra	1946	DA-14	DA-14 (-7)	1436	—	—	—	You've Got Me Out on a Limb
Davis	Dick Haymes with Harry James and His Orchestra	1946	DA-14	DA-14 (-8)	1562	—	—	—	Secrets in the Moonlight
Columbia	All Time Favorites	78s: 1946; 45s: 1950	C-117 (-1)	37141	WB24514, LA 2046	B-117 (-1)	4-37141	ZSP 4115	Ciribiribin (v. Frank Sinatra)
Columbia	All Time Favorites	78s: 1946; 45s: 1950	C-117 (-2)	37141	CO32472-1	B-117 (-2)	4-37141	ZSP 4116	Sleepy Lagoon
Columbia	All Time Favorites	78s: 1946; 45s: 1950	C-117 (-3)	37142	B22252-2	B-117 (-3)	4-37142	ZSP 4117	One O'Clock Jump
Columbia	All Time Favorites	78s: 1946; 45s: 1950	C-117 (-4)	37142	BW24194-1	B-117 (-4)	4-37142	ZSP 4118	Two O'Clock Jump
Columbia	All Time Favorites	78s: 1946; 45s: 1950	C-117 (-5)	37143	CO30509-1	B-117 (-5)	4-37143	ZSP 4119	You Made Me Love You
Columbia	All Time Favorites	78s: 1946; 45s: 1950	C-117 (-6)	37143	CO29423	B-117 (-6)	4-37143	ZSP 4120	Music Makers
Columbia	All Time Favorites	78s: 1946; 45s: 1950	C-117 (-7)	37144	CO29726	B-117 (-7)	4-37144	ZSP 4121	The Flight of the Bumble Bee
Columbia	All Time Favorites	78s: 1946; 45s: 1950	C-117 (-8)	37144	LA2051	B-117 (-8)	4-37144	ZSP 4122	Concerto for Trumpet
Columbia	Trumpet Time	78s: 1949; 45s: 1951	C-182 (-1)	38432	CO30195	B-182 (-1)	4-38432	ZSP 6244	I'll Get By (As Long as I Have You)
Columbia	Trumpet Time	78s: 1949; 45s: 1951	C-182 (-2)	38432	CO30510-1	B-182 (-8)	4-38432	ZSP 6245	My Silent Love
Columbia	Trumpet Time	78s: 1949; 45s: 1951	C-182 (-3)	38433	CO35083	B-182 (-2)	4-38433	ZSP 6246	Ain't Misbehavin'
Columbia	Trumpet Time	78s: 1949; 45s: 1951	C-182 (-4)	38433	CO32073	B-182 (-7)	4-38433	ZSP 6247	Strictly Instrumental
Columbia	Trumpet Time	78s: 1949; 45s: 1951	C-182 (-5)	38434	HCO1593	B-182 (-3)	4-38434	ZSP 6250	I'm Always Chasing Rainbows
Columbia	Trumpet Time	78s: 1949; 45s: 1951	C-182 (-6)	38434	HCO1126	B-182 (-6)	4-38434	ZSP 6251	I'm Beginning to See the Light
Columbia	Trumpet Time	78s: 1949; 45s: 1951	C-182 (-7)	38435	CO30056	B-182 (-4)	4-38435	ZSP 6248	Trumpet Rhapsody (Part I)
Columbia	Trumpet Time	78s: 1949; 45s: 1951	C-182 (-8)	38435	CO29729	B-182 (-5)	4-38435	ZSP 6249	Trumpet Rhapsody (Part II)
Columbia	Young Man with a Horn	78s: 1950; 45s: 1951	C-198 (-1)	38727	RHCO 4009	B-198 (-1)	4-38727	ZSP 4013	I May Be Wrong
Columbia	Young Man with a Horn	78s: 1950; 45s: 1951	C-198 (-2)	38727	RHCO 4016	B-198 (-2)	4-38727	ZSP 4017	Get Happy
Columbia	Young Man with a Horn	78s: 1950; 45s: 1951	C-198 (-3)	38728	RHCO 4013	B-198 (-3)	4-38728	ZSP 4014	The Man I Love
Columbia	Young Man with a Horn	78s: 1950; 45s: 1951	C-198 (-4)	38728	RHCO 4011	B-198 (-4)	4-38728	ZSP 4018	Too Marvelous for Words
Columbia	Young Man with a Horn	78s: 1950; 45s: 1951	C-198 (-5)	38729	RHCO 4010	B-198 (-5)	4-38729	ZSP 4015	The Very Thought of You
Columbia	Young Man with a Horn	78s: 1950; 45s: 1951	C-198 (-6)	38729	RHCO 4012	B-198 (-6)	4-38729	ZSP 4019	Limehouse Blues
Columbia	Young Man with a Horn	78s: 1950; 45s: 1951	C-198 (-7)	38730	RHCO 4014	B-198 (-7)	4-38730	ZSP 4016	Melancholy Rhapsody
Columbia	Young Man with a Horn	78s: 1950; 45s: 1951	C-198 (-8)	38730	RHCO 4015	B-198 (-8)	4-38730	ZSP 4020	With a Song in My Heart
Columbia	Harry James Dance Parade	1952	—	—	—	B-277 (-1)	4-39483	ZSP 7037	Flash
Columbia	Harry James Dance Parade	1952	—	—	—	B-277 (-8)	4-39483	ZSP 7044	Crazy Rhythm
Columbia	Harry James Dance Parade	1952	—	—	—	B-277 (-2)	4-39484	ZSP 7038	Back Beat Boogie
Columbia	Harry James Dance Parade	1952	—	—	—	B-277 (-7)	4-39484	ZSP 7043	Jeffrie's Blues
Columbia	Harry James Dance Parade	1952	—	—	—	B-277 (-3)	4-39485	ZSP 7039	Feet Draggin' Blues
Columbia	Harry James Dance Parade	1952	—	—	—	B-277 (-6)	4-39485	ZSP 7042	Sharp as a Tack
Columbia	Harry James Dance Parade	1952	—	—	—	B-277 (-4)	4-39486	ZSP 7040	Cross Country Jump
Columbia	Harry James Dance Parade	1952	—	—	—	B-277 (-5)	4-39486	ZSP 7041	Record Session
Columbia	Soft Lights, Sweet Trumpet	1952	—	—	—	B-296	4-39683	ZSP10076	Serenade in Blue (From "Orchestra Wives")
Columbia	Soft Lights, Sweet Trumpet	1952	—	—	—	B-296	4-39683	ZSP10074	Embraceable You ("Girl Crazy")
Columbia	Soft Lights, Sweet Trumpet	1952	—	—	—	B-296	4-39684	ZSP10043	Just a Gigolo
Columbia	Soft Lights, Sweet Trumpet	1952	—	—	—	B-296	4-39684	ZSP10075	Manhattan
Columbia	Soft Lights, Sweet Trumpet	1952	—	—	—	B-296	4-39685	ZSP10067	If I'm Lucky
Columbia	Soft Lights, Sweet Trumpet	1952	—	—	—	B-296	4-39685	ZSP10042	September in the Rain
Columbia	Soft Lights, Sweet Trumpet	1952	—	—	—	B-296	4-39686	ZSP10069	You Go to My Head
Columbia	Soft Lights, Sweet Trumpet	1952	—	—	—	B-296	4-39686	ZSP10068	That Old Feeling

=== 7" 33 and 45 rpm EPs and EP sets ===
Label	Title	Date	Catalog #	Disc #	Matrix	Track #	Track title
Columbia	All Time Favorites	1952	B-117 (-1)	5-1029	ZSP 11666	A1	Ciribiribin (They're So in Love)
Columbia	All Time Favorites	1952	B-117 (-1)	5-1029	ZSP 11666	A2	Sleepy Lagoon
Columbia	All Time Favorites	1952	B-117 (-4)	5-1029	ZSP 11669	D1	The Flight of the Bumble Bee
Columbia	All Time Favorites	1952	B-117 (-4)	5-1029	ZSP 11669	D2	Concerto for Trumpet
Columbia	All Time Favorites	1952	B-117 (-2)	5-1030	ZSP 11667	B1	You Made Me Love You (I Didn't Want to Do It)
Columbia	All Time Favorites	1952	B-117 (-2)	5-1030	ZSP 11667	B2	Music Makers
Columbia	All Time Favorites	1952	B-117 (-3)	5-1030	ZSP 11668	C1	One O'Clock Jump
Columbia	All Time Favorites	1952	B-117 (-3)	5-1030	ZSP 11668	C2	Two O'Clock Jump
Columbia	Trumpet Time	1952	B-182 (-1)	5-1033	ZSP 11682	A1	I'll Get By
Columbia	Trumpet Time	1952	B-182 (-1)	5-1033	ZSP 11682	A2	My Silent Love
Columbia	Trumpet Time	1952	B-182 (-4)	5-1033	ZSP 11685	D1	I'm Always Chasing Rainbows
Columbia	Trumpet Time	1952	B-182 (-4)	5-1033	ZSP 11685	D2	I'm Beginning to See the Light
Columbia	Trumpet Time	1952	B-182 (-2)	5-1034	ZSP 11683	B1	Ain't Misbehavin'
Columbia	Trumpet Time	1952	B-182 (-2)	5-1034	ZSP 11683	B2	Strictly Instrumental
Columbia	Trumpet Time	1952	B-182 (-3)	5-1034	ZSP 11684	C	Trumpet Rhapsody
Columbia	Young Man with a Horn	1952	B-198 (-1)	5-1041	SP 11518	A1	I May Be Wrong
Columbia	Young Man with a Horn	1952	B-198 (-1)	5-1041	SP 11518	A2	The Man I Love
Columbia	Young Man with a Horn	1952	B-198 (-4)	5-1041	SP 11521	D1	Limehouse Blues
Columbia	Young Man with a Horn	1952	B-198 (-4)	5-1041	SP 11521	D2	With a Song in My Heart
Columbia	Young Man with a Horn	1952	B-198 (-2)	5-1042	SP 11519	B1	The Very Thought of You
Columbia	Young Man with a Horn	1952	B-198 (-2)	5-1042	SP 11519	B2	Melancholy Rhapsody
Columbia	Young Man with a Horn	1952	B-198 (-3)	5-1042	SP 11520	C1	Get Happy
Columbia	Young Man with a Horn	1952	B-198 (-3)	5-1042	SP 11520	C2	Too Marvelous for Words
Columbia	Harry James Dance Parade	1952	B-277 (-1)	5-1310	ZSP 11756	A1	Flash
Columbia	Harry James Dance Parade	1952	B-277 (-1)	5-1310	ZSP 11756	A2	Back Beat Boogie
Columbia	Harry James Dance Parade	1952	B-277 (-4)	5-1310	ZSP 11759	D1	Jeffrie's Blues
Columbia	Harry James Dance Parade	1952	B-277 (-4)	5-1310	ZSP 11759	D2	Crazy Rhythm
Columbia	Harry James Dance Parade	1952	B-277 (-2)	5-1311	ZSP 11758	B1	Feet Draggin' Blues
Columbia	Harry James Dance Parade	1952	B-277 (-2)	5-1311	ZSP 11758	B2	Cross Country Jump
Columbia	Harry James Dance Parade	1952	B-277 (-3)	5-1311	ZSP 11757	C1	Record Session
Columbia	Harry James Dance Parade	1952	B-277 (-3)	5-1311	ZSP 11757	C2	Sharp as a Tack
Columbia	Soft Lights, Sweet Trumpet	1952	B-296 (-1)	5-1091	SP 11506	A1	Serenade in Blue (From "Orchestra Wives")
Columbia	Soft Lights, Sweet Trumpet	1952	B-296 (-1)	5-1091	SP 11506	A2	Manhattan
Columbia	Soft Lights, Sweet Trumpet	1952	B-296 (-4)	5-1091	SP 11509	D1	Just a Gigolo
Columbia	Soft Lights, Sweet Trumpet	1952	B-296 (-4)	5-1091	SP 11509	D2	Embraceable You ("Girl Crazy")
Columbia	Soft Lights, Sweet Trumpet	1952	B-296 (-2)	5-1092	SP 11507	B1	September in the Rain (From "Melody for Two")
Columbia	Soft Lights, Sweet Trumpet	1952	B-296 (-2)	5-1092	SP 11507	B2	You Go to My Head
Columbia	Soft Lights, Sweet Trumpet	1952	B-296 (-3)	5-1092	SP 11508	C1	That Old Feeling ("Walter Wanger's Vogues of 1938")
Columbia	Soft Lights, Sweet Trumpet	1952	B-296 (-3)	5-1092	SP 11508	C2	If I'm Lucky
Columbia	Hollywood's Best	1952	B-319 (-1)	5-1013	ZSP 11642	A1	You'll Never Know
Columbia	Hollywood's Best	1952	B-319 (-1)	5-1013	ZSP 11642	A2	On the Atchison, Topeka and the Santa Fe
Columbia	Hollywood's Best	1952	B-319 (-4)	5-1013	ZSP 11645	D1	When You Wish Upon a Star
Columbia	Hollywood's Best	1952	B-319 (-4)	5-1013	ZSP 11645	D2	In the Cool, Cool, Cool of the Evening
Columbia	Hollywood's Best	1952	B-319 (-2)	5-1014	ZSP 11643	B1	It Might as Well Be Spring
Columbia	Hollywood's Best	1952	B-319 (-2)	5-1014	ZSP 11643	B2	Over the Rainbow
Columbia	Hollywood's Best	1952	B-319 (-3)	5-1014	ZSP 11644	C1	Sweet Leilani
Columbia	Hollywood's Best	1952	B-319 (-3)	5-1014	ZSP 11644	C2	The Continental
Columbia	Hollywood's Best Vol. 1	1953	B-1659	5-1508	ZSP 11642	A1	You'll Never Know
Columbia	Hollywood's Best Vol. 1	1953	B-1659	5-1508	ZSP 11642	A2	On the Atchison, Topeka and the Santa Fe
Columbia	Hollywood's Best Vol. 1	1953	B-1659	5-1508	ZSP 11645	B1	When You Wish Upon a Star
Columbia	Hollywood's Best Vol. 1	1953	B-1659	5-1508	ZSP 11645	B2	In the Cool, Cool, Cool of the Evening
Columbia	Hollywood's Best Vol. 2	1953	B-1687	5-1571	ZSP 11643	A1	It Might as Well Be Spring
Columbia	Hollywood's Best Vol. 2	1953	B-1687	5-1571	ZSP 11643	A2	Over the Rainbow
Columbia	Hollywood's Best Vol. 2	1953	B-1687	5-1571	ZSP 11644	B1	Sweet Leilani
Columbia	Hollywood's Best Vol. 2	1953	B-1687	5-1571	ZSP 11644	B2	The Continental (You Kiss While Your Dancing)
Columbia	Spotlite	1953	B-1601	5-1326	ZSP 12594	A	Vine Street Blues Part 1 & 2
Columbia	Spotlite	1953	B-1601	5-1326	ZSP 12595	B	Tuxedo Junction Part 1 & 2
Columbia	Harry James in Person	1953	B-1632	5-1408	ZSP 13099	A	Feet Draggin' Blues
Columbia	Harry James in Person	1953	B-1632	5-1408	ZSP 13177	B	There They Go
Columbia	Harry James In Person Vol. 2	1953	B-1675	5-1557	ZSP 13798	A	Back Beat Boogie
Columbia	Harry James In Person Vol. 2	1953	B-1675	5-1557	ZSP 13799	B1	You Go To My Head
Columbia	Harry James In Person Vol. 2	1953	B-1675	5-1557	ZSP 13799	B2	The Flight of the Bumble Bee
Columbia	Harry James in Person Vol. 3	1953	B-1742	B-1742	ZSP 12966	A	Blues from "An American in Paris"
Columbia	Harry James in Person Vol. 3	1953	B-1742	B-1742	ZSP 12964	B	Ultra
Columbia	One Night Stand; Recorded at the Aragon Ballroom, Chicago	1953	B-385 (-1)	5-1838	ZEP 30596	A1	Mam Bongo
Columbia	One Night Stand; Recorded at the Aragon Ballroom, Chicago	1953	B-385 (-1)	5-1838	ZEP 30596	A2	Memphis Blues
Columbia	One Night Stand; Recorded at the Aragon Ballroom, Chicago	1953	B-385 (-4)	5-1838	ZSP 13177	D	There They Go
Columbia	One Night Stand; Recorded at the Aragon Ballroom, Chicago	1953	B-385 (-2)	5-1839	ZSP 13099	B	Feet Draggin' Blues
Columbia	One Night Stand; Recorded at the Aragon Ballroom, Chicago	1953	B-385 (-3)	5-1839	ZEP 30597	C1	Jackpot Blues
Columbia	One Night Stand; Recorded at the Aragon Ballroom, Chicago	1953	B-385 (-3)	5-1839	ZEP 30597	C2	Don't Stop
Columbia	Harry James in Person; Recorded at the Aragon Ballroom, Chicago	1953	B-390 (-1)	5-1858	ZEP 30751	A	Ultra
Columbia	Harry James in Person; Recorded at the Aragon Ballroom, Chicago	1953	B-390 (-4)	5-1858	ZEP 30754	D	Back Beat Boogie
Columbia	Harry James in Person; Recorded at the Aragon Ballroom, Chicago	1953	B-390 (-2)	5-1859	ZEP 30752	B	Blues from "An American in Paris"
Columbia	Harry James in Person; Recorded at the Aragon Ballroom, Chicago	1953	B-390 (-3)	5-1859	ZEP 30753	C1	The Flight of the Bumble Bee
Columbia	Harry James in Person; Recorded at the Aragon Ballroom, Chicago	1953	B-390 (-3)	5-1859	ZEP 30753	C2	You Go to My Head
Columbia	Trumpet After Midnight	1954	B-410 (-1)	5-1905	ZEP 30984	A1	Autumn Leaves
Columbia	Trumpet After Midnight	1954	B-410 (-1)	5-1905	ZEP 30984	A2	Judy
Columbia	Trumpet After Midnight	1954	B-410 (-4)	5-1905	ZEP 30989	D1	Bess, You Is My Woman
Columbia	Trumpet After Midnight	1954	B-410 (-4)	5-1905	ZEP 30989	D2	I Never Knew (I Could Love Anybody Like I'm Loving You)
Columbia	Trumpet After Midnight	1954	B-410 (-2)	5-1906	ZEP 30598	B1	How Deep Is the Ocean (How High Is the Sky)
Columbia	Trumpet After Midnight	1954	B-410 (-2)	5-1906	ZEP 30598	B2	Symphony
Columbia	Trumpet After Midnight	1954	B-410 (-3)	5-1906	ZEP 30987	C1	If I Loved You
Columbia	Trumpet After Midnight	1954	B-410 (-3)	5-1906	ZEP 30987	C2	I Had the Craziest Dream
Columbia	Dancing in Person with Harry James At; The Hollywood Palladium	1954	B-428 (-1)	5-1964	ZEP 31660	A1	Sugar Foot Stomp
Columbia	Dancing in Person with Harry James At; The Hollywood Palladium	1954	B-428 (-1)	5-1964	ZEP 31660	A2	Moonlight Bay
Columbia	Dancing in Person with Harry James At; The Hollywood Palladium	1954	B-428 (-4)	5-1964	ZEP 31661	D1	Bye Bye Blues
Columbia	Dancing in Person with Harry James At; The Hollywood Palladium	1954	B-428 (-4)	5-1964	ZEP 31661	D2	Ain't She Sweet (v. Buddy Rich)
Columbia	Dancing in Person with Harry James At; The Hollywood Palladium	1954	B-428 (-2)	5-1965	ZEP 31662	B	Please Take a Letter, Miss Brown
Columbia	Dancing in Person with Harry James At; The Hollywood Palladium	1954	B-428 (-3)	5-1965	ZEP 31663	C1	How Could You Do a Thing Like That to Me
Columbia	Dancing in Person with Harry James At; The Hollywood Palladium	1954	B-428 (-3)	5-1965	ZEP 31663	C2	Midnight Sun
Columbia	Pop Hits By Harry James; Vol. 1	1954	B-1864	B-1864	ZEP 31815	A1	Little Things Mean a Lot
Columbia	Pop Hits By Harry James; Vol. 1	1954	B-1864	B-1864	ZEP 31815	A2	Hernando's Hideaway
Columbia	Pop Hits By Harry James; Vol. 1	1954	B-1864	B-1864	ZEP 31816	B1	Three Coins in the Fountain
Columbia	Pop Hits By Harry James; Vol. 1	1954	B-1864	B-1864	ZEP 31816	B2	The High and the Mighty
Columbia	Pop Hits By Harry James; Vol. 2	1954	B-1881	B-1881	ZEP 34126	A1	Smile
Columbia	Pop Hits By Harry James; Vol. 2	1954	B-1881	B-1881	ZEP 34126	A2	I Need You Now
Columbia	Pop Hits By Harry James; Vol. 2	1954	B-1881	B-1881	ZEP 34127	B1	Oop Shoop
Columbia	Pop Hits By Harry James; Vol. 2	1954	B-1881	B-1881	ZEP 34127	B2	Muskrat Ramble
Columbia	All Time Favorites; By Harry James	1955	B-2014	B-2014	ZEP 35077	A1	Don't Be That Way
Columbia	All Time Favorites; By Harry James	1955	B-2014	B-2014	ZEP 35077	A2	Flatbush Flanagan
Columbia	All Time Favorites; By Harry James	1955	B-2014	B-2014	ZEP 35078	B1	September Song (From "Knickerbocker Holiday")
Columbia	All Time Favorites; By Harry James	1955	B-2014	B-2014	ZEP 35078	B2	Sleepy Time Gal
Columbia	Jazz Session	1955	B-502 (-1)	5-2175	ZEP 35480	A1	Anything
Columbia	Jazz Session	1955	B-502 (-1)	5-2175	ZEP 35480	A2	One for My Baby (And One More for the Road)
Columbia	Jazz Session	1955	B-502 (-4)	5-2175	ZEP 35483	D1	Perdido
Columbia	Jazz Session	1955	B-502 (-4)	5-2175	ZEP 35483	D2	Queen of the Mambo
Columbia	Jazz Session	1955	B-502 (-2)	5-2176	ZEP 35481	B1	Moonlight Fiesta
Columbia	Jazz Session	1955	B-502 (-2)	5-2176	ZEP 35481	B1	(Get Your Kicks on) Route 66!
Columbia	Jazz Session	1955	B-502 (-3)	5-2176	ZEP 35482	C1	I'll Remember April
Columbia	Jazz Session	1955	B-502 (-3)	5-2176	ZEP 35482	C2	Concerto for Clarinet
Columbia	Jazz Session	1955	B-2041	B-2041	ZEP 35484	A1	Marchin'
Columbia	Jazz Session	1955	B-2041	B-2041	ZEP 35484	A2	Tenderly
Columbia	Jazz Session	1955	B-2041	B-2041	ZEP 35485	B1	Bali Hai
Columbia	Jazz Session	1955	B-2041	B-2041	ZEP 35485	B2	Stealin' Apples
Columbia	Eight to the Valve (with Pete Johnson and Albert Ammons at the Piano)	1955	B-2048	B-2048	ZEP 35474	A1	Boo-Woo
Columbia	Eight to the Valve (with Pete Johnson and Albert Ammons at the Piano)	1955	B-2048	B-2048	ZEP 35474	A2	Woo-Woo
Columbia	Eight to the Valve (with Pete Johnson and Albert Ammons at the Piano)	1955	B-2048	B-2048	ZEP 35475	B1	Home James
Columbia	Eight to the Valve (with Pete Johnson and Albert Ammons at the Piano)	1955	B-2048	B-2048	ZEP 35475	B2	Jesse
Capitol	Harry James in Hi-Fi; Part 1 (Note: Capitol also sold a 2-disc 45 rpm EP entitled Harry James In Hi-Fi Parts 1 & 2 as catalog # EBF 1-654.)	1955	EAP 1-654	1-654	F1-654	A1	Ciribiribin
Capitol	Harry James in Hi-Fi; Part 1	1955	EAP 1-654	1-654	F1-654	A2	James Session
Capitol	Harry James in Hi-Fi; Part 1	1955	EAP 1-654	1-654	F8-654	B1	I'm Beginning to See the Light
Capitol	Harry James in Hi-Fi; Part 1	1955	EAP 1-654	1-654	F8-654	B2	Cherry
Capitol	Harry James in Hi-Fi; Part 2	1955	EAP 2-654	2-654	F2-654	A1	You Made Me Love You (I Didn't Want to Do It)
Capitol	Harry James in Hi-Fi; Part 2	1955	EAP 2-654	2-654	F2-654	A2	I've Heard That Song Before
Capitol	Harry James in Hi-Fi; Part 2	1955	EAP 2-654	2-654	F7-654	B1	Music Makers
Capitol	Harry James in Hi-Fi; Part 2	1955	EAP 2-654	2-654	F7-654	B2	My Silent Love
Capitol	Harry James in Hi-Fi; Part 3 (Note: Capitol also sold a 2-disc 45 rpm EP entitled Harry James In Hi-Fi Parts 3 & 4 as catalog # EBF 2-654.)	1955	EAP 3-654	3-654	F3-654	A1	Ciribiribin
Capitol	Harry James in Hi-Fi; Part 3	1955	EAP 3-654	3-654	F3-654	A2	Velvet Moon
Capitol	Harry James in Hi-Fi; Part 3	1955	EAP 3-654	3-654	F6-654	B1	Trumpet Blues
Capitol	Harry James in Hi-Fi; Part 3	1955	EAP 3-654	3-654	F6-654	B2	I Cried For You (Now It's Your Turn To Cry Over Me)
Capitol	Harry James in Hi-Fi; Part 4	1955	EAP 4-654	4-654	F4-654	A1	Sleepy Lagoon
Capitol	Harry James in Hi-Fi; Part 4	1955	EAP 4-654	4-654	F4-654	A2	Two O'clock Jump
Capitol	Harry James in Hi-Fi; Part 4	1955	EAP 4-654	4-654	F5-654	B1	Jalousie
Capitol	Harry James in Hi-Fi; Part 4	1955	EAP 4-654	4-654	F5-654	B2	It's Been a Long, Long Time
Capitol	More Harry James in Hi-Fi; Part 1 (Note: Capitol also sold a 2-disc 45 rpm EP entitled More Harry James In Hi-Fi Parts 1 & 2 as catalog # EBF 1-712.)	1956	EAP 1-712	1-712	F1-712	A	Street Scene
Capitol	More Harry James in Hi-Fi; Part 1	1956	EAP 1-712	1-712	F8-712	B1	Crazy Rhythm
Capitol	More Harry James in Hi-Fi; Part 1	1956	EAP 1-712	1-712	F8-712	B2	Melancholy Rhapsody
Capitol	More Harry James in Hi-Fi; Part 2	1956	EAP 2-712	2-712	F2-712	A1	The Mole
Capitol	More Harry James in Hi-Fi; Part 2	1956	EAP 2-712	2-712	F2-712	A2	Strictly Instrumental
Capitol	More Harry James in Hi-Fi; Part 2	1956	EAP 2-712	2-712	F7-712	B	Blue Again
Capitol	More Harry James in Hi-Fi; Part 3 (Note: Capitol also sold a 2-disc 45 rpm EP entitled More Harry James In Hi-Fi Parts 3 & 4 as catalog # EBF 2-712.)	1956	EAP 3-712	3-712	F3-712	A1	Sleepy Time Gal
Capitol	More Harry James in Hi-Fi; Part 3	1956	EAP 3-712	3-712	F3-712	A2	Autumn Serenade
Capitol	More Harry James in Hi-Fi; Part 3	1956	EAP 3-712	3-712	F6-712	B1	Carnival
Capitol	More Harry James in Hi-Fi; Part 3	1956	EAP 3-712	3-712	F6-712	B2	Don Cha Go Way Mad
Capitol	More Harry James in Hi-Fi; Part 4	1956	EAP 4-712	4-712	F4-712	A	September Song
Capitol	More Harry James in Hi-Fi; Part 4	1956	EAP 4-712	4-712	F5-712	B1	These Foolish Things
Capitol	More Harry James in Hi-Fi; Part 4	1956	EAP 4-712	4-712	F5-712	B2	Somebody Loves Me
Capitol	Wild About Harry! Part 1	1957	EAP 1-874	1-874	F1-874	A1	Kinda Like the Blues
Capitol	Wild About Harry! Part 1	1957	EAP 1-874	1-874	F1-874	A2	Countin'
Capitol	Wild About Harry! Part 1	1957	EAP 1-874	1-874	F6-874	B1	Blues for Harry's Sake
Capitol	Wild About Harry! Part 1	1957	EAP 1-874	1-874	F6-874	B2	Cotton Pickin'
Capitol	Wild About Harry! Part 2	1957	EAP 2-874	2-874	F2-874	A	Blues for Lovers Only
Capitol	Wild About Harry! Part 2	1957	EAP 2-874	2-874	F5-874	B1	Barn 12
Capitol	Wild About Harry! Part 2	1957	EAP 2-874	2-874	F5-874	B2	Bee Gee
Capitol	Wild About Harry! Part 3	1957	EAP 3-874	3-874	F3-874	A1	Ring for Porter
Capitol	Wild About Harry! Part 3	1957	EAP 3-874	3-874	F3-874	A2	Blues on a Count
Capitol	Wild About Harry! Part 3	1957	EAP 3-874	3-874	F4-874	B	What Am I Here For?
Columbia; Hall of Fame	Harry James; And His Orchestra	1957	B-2504	B-2504	ZEP 41449	A1	Trumpet Raphsody (Part I)
Columbia; Hall of Fame	Harry James; And His Orchestra	1957	B-2504	B-2504	ZEP 41449	A2	Trumpet Raphsody (Part II)
Columbia; Hall of Fame	Harry James; And His Orchestra	1957	B-2504	B-2504	ZEP 41448	B1	The Carnival of Venice
Columbia; Hall of Fame	Harry James; And His Orchestra	1957	B-2504	B-2504	ZEP 41448	B2	The Flight of the Bumble Bee
Columbia; Hall of Fame	Harry James; And His Orchestra	1957	B-2505	B-2505	ZEP 41343	A1	Ciribiribin (They're So in Love)
Columbia; Hall of Fame	Harry James; And His Orchestra	1957	B-2505	B-2505	ZEP 41343	A2	Back Beat Boogie
Columbia; Hall of Fame	Harry James; And His Orchestra	1957	B-2505	B-2505	ZEP 41344	B1	Music Makers
Columbia; Hall of Fame	Harry James; And His Orchestra	1957	B-2505	B-2505	ZEP 41344	B2	Two O'Clock Jump
Columbia; Hall of Fame	Harry James; And His Orchestra	1957	B-2506	B-2506	ZEP 41359	A1	Trumpet Blues (And Cantabile)
Columbia; Hall of Fame	Harry James; And His Orchestra	1957	B-2506	B-2506	ZEP 41359	A2	You Made Me Love You (I Didn't Want to Do It)
Columbia; Hall of Fame	Harry James; And His Orchestra	1957	B-2506	B-2506	ZEP 41360	B1	Feet Draggin' Blues
Columbia; Hall of Fame	Harry James; And His Orchestra	1957	B-2506	B-2506	ZEP 41360	B2	Sleepy Lagoon
Columbia; Hall of Fame	Harry James; And His Orchestra; Featuring Helen Forrest	1957	B-2507	B-2507	ZEP 41450	A1	I've Heard That Song Before
Columbia; Hall of Fame	Harry James; And His Orchestra; Featuring Helen Forrest	1957	B-2507	B-2507	ZEP 41450	A2	I Had the Craziest Dream
Columbia; Hall of Fame	Harry James; And His Orchestra; Featuring Helen Forrest	1957	B-2507	B-2507	ZEP 41451	B1	I Don't Want to Walk Without You
Columbia; Hall of Fame	Harry James; And His Orchestra; Featuring Helen Forrest	1957	B-2507	B-2507	ZEP 41451	B2	Skylark
Columbia; Hall of Fame	Harry James; And His Orchestra	1957	B-2508	B-2508	ZEP 41452	A1	Crazy Rhythm
Columbia; Hall of Fame	Harry James; And His Orchestra	1957	B-2508	B-2508	ZEP 41452	A2	Easter Parade
Columbia; Hall of Fame	Harry James; And His Orchestra	1957	B-2508	B-2508	ZEP 41453	B1	Jump Town
Columbia; Hall of Fame	Harry James; And His Orchestra	1957	B-2508	B-2508	ZEP 41453	B2	Cherry
Columbia; Hall of Fame	Harry James; And His Orchestra	1957	B-2509	B-2509	ZEP 41361	A1	The Brave Bulls (La Virgen De La Macarena)
Columbia; Hall of Fame	Harry James; And His Orchestra	1957	B-2509	B-2509	ZEP 41361	A2	The Man with the Horn
Columbia; Hall of Fame	Harry James; And His Orchestra	1957	B-2509	B-2509	ZEP 41362	B1	Strictly Instrumental
Columbia; Hall of Fame	Harry James; And His Orchestra	1957	B-2509	B-2509	ZEP 41362	B2	I'm Beginning to See the Light
Columbia; Hall of Fame	Harry James	1958	B-2577	B-2577	ZEP 42875	A1	Flatbush Flanagan
Columbia; Hall of Fame	Harry James	1958	B-2577	B-2577	ZEP 42875	A2	Prince Charming
Columbia; Hall of Fame	Harry James	1958	B-2577	B-2577	ZEP 42876	B1	A Sinner Kissed an Angel
Columbia; Hall of Fame	Harry James	1958	B-2577	B-2577	ZEP 42876	B2	Jalousie
Capitol	The New James; Part 1	1958	EAP 1-1037	1-1037	F1-1037	A1	Fair and Warmer
Capitol	The New James; Part 1	1958	EAP 1-1037	1-1037	F1-1037	A2	J. Walkin'
Capitol	The New James; Part 1	1958	EAP 1-1037	1-1037	F6-1037	B	Walkin' on Air
Capitol	The New James; Part 2	1958	EAP 2-1037	2-1037	F2-1037	A1	One on the House
Capitol	The New James; Part 2	1958	EAP 2-1037	2-1037	F2-1037	A2	Just Lucky
Capitol	The New James; Part 2	1958	EAP 2-1037	2-1037	F5-1037	B1	Here's One
Capitol	The New James; Part 2	1958	EAP 2-1037	2-1037	F5-1037	B2	Bells
Capitol	The New James; Part 3	1958	EAP 3-1037	3-1037	F3-1037	A	Bangtail
Capitol	The New James; Part 3	1958	EAP 3-1037	3-1037	F4-1037	B	Warm Blue Stream
Capitol	Harry's Choice! Part 1	1958	EAP 1-1093	1-1093	F1-1093	A1	You're My Thrill
Capitol	Harry's Choice! Part 1	1958	EAP 1-1093	1-1093	F1-1093	A2	Willow Weep for Me
Capitol	Harry's Choice! Part 1	1958	EAP 1-1093	1-1093	F6-1093	B	The New Two O’Clock Jump
Capitol	Harry's Choice! Part 2	1958	EAP 2-1093	2-1093	F2-1093	A	Blues for Sale
Capitol	Harry's Choice! Part 2	1958	EAP 2-1093	2-1093	F5-1093	B	Just for Fun
Capitol	Harry's Choice! Part 3	1958	EAP 3-1093	3-1093	F3-1093	A	I Want a Little Girl
Capitol	Harry's Choice! Part 3	1958	EAP 3-1093	3-1093	F4-1093	B1	Moten Swing
Capitol	Harry's Choice! Part 3	1958	EAP 3-1093	3-1093	F4-1093	B2	(Do You Know What It Means to Miss) New Orleans
MGM	Harry James...Today!	1960	SE 3848	SB-21		A	Satin Doll
MGM	Harry James...Today!	1960	SE 3848	SB-21		B	Undecided
MGM	Harry James...Today!	1960	SE 3848	SB-22		A	Ensemble
MGM	Harry James...Today!	1960	SE 3848	SB-22		B	King Porter Stomp
MGM	Harry James...Today!	1960	SE 3848	SB-23		A	Eyes
MGM	Harry James...Today!	1960	SE 3848	SB-23	60-STH-445	B	Take the "A" Train
MGM	Harry James...Today!	1960	SE 3848	SB-24		A	Jersey Bounce
MGM	Harry James...Today!	1960	SE 3848	SB-24		B	End of Town Blues
MGM	Harry James...Today!	1960	SE 3848	SB-25	60-STH-448	A	Rockin' in Rhythm
MGM	Harry James...Today!	1960	SE 3848	SB-25	60-STH-449	B	Lester Leaps In
Capitol	The Hits of Harry James	1961	XE 1515	1-1515	X1-1515	A	You Made Me Love You
Capitol	The Hits of Harry James	1961	XE 1515	1-1515	X2-1515	B	I've Heard That Song Before
Capitol	The Hits of Harry James	1961	XE 1515	2-1515	X3-1515	A	Trumpet Blues
Capitol	The Hits of Harry James	1961	XE 1515	2-1515	X4-1515	B	Cherry
Capitol	The Hits of Harry James	1961	XE 1515	3-1515	X5-1515	A	I'm Beginning to See the Light
Capitol	The Hits of Harry James	1961	XE 1515	3-1515	X6-1515	B	Sleepy Lagoon
Capitol	The Hits of Harry James	1961	XE 1515	4-1515	X7-1515	A	Two O'Clock Jump
Capitol	The Hits of Harry James	1961	XE 1515	4-1515	X8-1515	B	I Cried for You
Capitol	The Hits of Harry James	1961	XE 1515	5-1515	X9-1515	A	Music Makers
Capitol	The Hits of Harry James	1961	XE 1515	5-1515	X10-1515	B	Ciribiribin

== Appearances and multiple-artist compilations ==
=== Albums and album box sets ===
==== Studio albums ====
Label	Title	Year	Appearance with / Billed as	Catalog #	Track List
Capitol	Dance to the Bands!	1956	Harry James, Les Brown, Ray Anthony, Billy May, Woody Herman, and Stan Kenton	TBO 727 (2x LP)	April in Paris, Walkin' Home, Smogbound

==== Live albums ====
Label	Title	Year	Appearance with / Billed as	Catalog #	Track List
Radiola	New Year's Radio Dancing Party (1945, 1946)	1974	Various	MR 1031	Sad Sack
Calliope	Sessions, Live (Recorded live in studio 7/15/1958 for KABC's Stars of Jazz TV show)	1976	Harry James on Side A, Les Brown on Side B	CAL 3005	Side A: Just Lucky, Jay Walking, Lover Come Back to Me (v.Jilla Webb), Just for Fun, Blues for Sale
Joyce	Spotlight on Jerry Wald, Jan Savitt and Harry James (1944)	1977	Jerry Wald, Jan Savitt, Harry James	LP 4002	Love Department, And Then You Kissed Me, Amour, King Porter Stomp, "I Could, Could You", I Cover the Waterfront
Sunbeam	Big Band Swing	1978	Various	SB 223	I'm in Love with Two Sweethearts
Joyce	Earl Hines' Jubilee with Harry James (1944)	1979	Various	LP 5012	Blue Skies, Don't Cry Baby, Chelsea Bridge
Joyce	One Night Stand with Buddy Rich & Harry James (Band Box, New York, March 1953)	1980	Buddy Rich Quartet Plus; Harry James and Don Elliot	1078	I Found a New Baby, Tarry with Harry, Fine and Dandy, Two O'Clock Jump, Seven Come Eleven, Air Mail Special, These Foolish Things
Jazz Archives	Unissued Big Band Treasures 1941-1944	1981	Various	JA 50	James Session -Into- Night Special, You Made Me Love You
Europa Jazz	Europa Jazz (Live at the 1965 Monterey Jazz Festival)	1981	Duke Ellington, Harry James, Herb Pomeroy, Jon Hendricks	EJ 1022	Too Close for Comfort, Little Girl Blue, Ten Years of Tears, Caravan, Flying Home, Two O'Clock Jump
Europa Jazz	Europa Jazz (Live at the 1965 Monterey Jazz Festival)	1981	Harry James, Buddy Rich, Woody Herman	EJ 1041	Shiny Stockings, Sophisticated Lady, Green Onions, The Jazz Connoisseur
Sunbeam	Harry James & Ziggy Elman (1940)	1984	Harry James, Ziggy Elman	SB 233	Sheik of Araby, Alice Blue Gown, How High the Moon, It's the Last Time, Headin' for Hallelujah, You've Got Me Out on a Limb, The Moon Won't Talk, Four or Five Times
Joyce	The Big Bands' Greatest Vocalists: Helen Ward	1984	Harry James, Benny Goodman, Gene Krupa	6040	Daddy, Don't Cry Baby, You Go to My Head, Somebody Loves Me, I've Had This Feeling Before, Where or When, "No Love, No Nothing"
LRC	The Best of the Big Bands Vol. II (At the 1965 Monterey Jazz Festival)	1989	Count Basie, Duke Ellington, Benny Goodman, Harry James	CDC 8528	Shiny Stockings, Sophisticated Lady, Green Onions, The Jazz Connoisseur
LRC	The Best of the Big Dance Bands (At the 1965 Monterey Jazz Festival)	1990	Benny Goodman, Woody Herman, Harry James	CDC 9010	Shiny Stockings, Sophisticated Lady, Green Onions, The Jazz Connoisseur, Too Close for Comfort, Little Girl Blue

==== Soundtrack / stage & screen albums ====
Label	Title	Year	Appearance with / Billed as	Catalog #	Track List
Caliban	Do You Love Me / One Hour with You	197?	Various	6011	Do You Love Me?, I Wish I Knew, As If I Didn't Have Enough on My Mind, The More I See You, I Didn't Mean a Word I Said, Eight Bar Riff, Wedding March, St. Louis Blues, Do You Love Me?
Caliban	Two Girls and a Sailor	197?	Various	6022	Sweet and Lovely, Charmaine, A Love Like Ours, Estrelita, In a Moment of Madness, Flash, Young Man with a Horn, Castles in the Air, Sweet and Lovely, Inka Dinka Doo, Medley
Caliban	Best Foot Forward / Too Much Harmony / Going Hollywood	197?	Various	6039	Two O'Clock Jump, Shady Lady Bird, "Barrelhouse, Boogie Woogie and the Blues", Buckle Down Winsocki
Sound/Stage Recordings	Two Girls and a Sailor	1974	Various	2307	Charmaine, Estrellita, Sweet and Lovely, A Young Man with a Horn
MGM	Music From The Motion Picture Soundtrack - That's Entertainment, Part 2	1976	Various	MG-1-5301	Inka Dinka Doo (v. Jimmy Durante)
BIAC	Hollywood Checks Rarest of All Rare Performances	1979	Various	BRAD 10538-539 (2x LP)	Pan Americana Jubilee
Hollywood Soundstage	Down Argentine Way / Springtime in the Rockies	1983	Carmen Miranda, Harry James, Bando da Lua, Betty Grable, Don Ameche	HS 5013	Opening Fanfare and Music - South American Way, Down Argentine Way, Musical Montage - Orchestra - (Down Argentine Way, Nenita, Doin' the Conga), "Mama Eu Quero / Bombu, Bombu", Fiesta Time / Sing to Your Senorita, Two Dreams Met, Mama Eu Quero / Finale - Cast / Down Argentine Way / Sing to Your Senorita / Down Argentine Way / Two Dreams Met, Opening Music, "Run, Little Raindrop, Run", Chiribiribin / I Had the Craziest Dream / You Made Me Love You, "Run, Little Raindrop, Run", Chattanooga Choo Choo, A Poem Set to Music, I Had the Craziest Dream, Tic Tac Do Meu Coracao, Pan Americana Jubilee
MCA	Hannah and Her Sisters	1986	Various	MCA 6190	You Made Me Love You, I've Heard That Song Before
Hear Music / Rhino	The Big Picture - Great Music from Films You Love	2002	Various	OPCD 1135	Inka Dinka Doo (v. Jimmy Durante)

==== Compilation albums ====
Label	Title	Year	Appearance with / Billed as	Catalog #	Track List
Columbia	Popular Favorites, Vol. 3	1950	Various	CL 6150	Mona Lisa
Columbia	This Is My Best	1952	Various	CL 6212	You Made Me Love You
Columbia	Current Pop Instrumentals	1953	Various	CL 6262	Ruby
Columbia	Dance the Fox Trot	1953	Various	CL 533	I’m Beginning To See The Light
Columbia	Popular Favorites, Vol. 8	1954	Various	CL 6284	O, Mein Papa
Columbia	Popular Favorites, Vol. 9	1954	Various	CL 6294	Three Coins In The Fountain, The High And The Mighty, Little Things Mean A Lot, Hernando's Hideaway
Columbia	Late Music Vol. I	1954	Various	CL 541	My Melancholy Baby
Columbia	Requested By You	1955	Various	CL 607	Deep Purple, September Song
Columbia	Hall of Fame Series: Ballroom Bandstand	1955	Various	CL 611	Two O'Clock Jump, Back Beat Boogie
Columbia	Upright and Lowdown	1955	Harry James, Pete Johnson, Big Joe Turner, Albert Ammons, Meade Lux Lewis, Mary Lou Williams, Jimmy Yancey, Champion Jack Dupree, Henry "Red" Allen	CL 685	Boo-Woo, Home James, Woo-Woo, Jesse
Columbia	$64,000 Jazz	1955	Various	CL 777	One O'Clock Jump
Columbia Record Club	Jazz At Columbia - Swing	1955	Various	CB 4	Stealin' Apples
Columbia Record Club	Jazz At Columbia Collector's Items	1956	Harry James and Pete Johnson, Various	CB 16	Home James
Columbia	Guys and Dolls	1956	Various	CL 2567	Guys and Dolls, I'll Know
Columbia	Love Is a Kick	1958	Frank Sinatra	CL 1241	Deep Night, "Farewell, Farewell to Love"
Capitol	Big Band Stereo	1958	Various	SW 1055	Cotton Pickin'
Capitol	The Stars in Stereo	1958	Various	SW 1062	Ring for Porter
Capitol	Swingin' Stereo! with Ten Big Bands	1959	Various	SW 1161	You're My Thrill
Capitol	The Big Sound of the Big Bands	1959	Various	SL 6523	The New Two O'Clock Jump
Harmony	Theme Songs of Great Name Bands	1959	Various	HL 7153	Ciribiribin (They're So in Love)
Capitol	Swing Again!	1960	Various	T 1386	Two O'Clock Jump, Trumpet Blues
Harmony	Great Bands!	1960	Harry James, Jimmy Dorsey, Les Brown, Woody Herman, Gene Krupa	HL 7238	Strictly Instrumental, Cherry
Harmony	Greatest Hits! An All-Star Parade	1960	Various	HL 7255	On a Little Street in Singapore
Capitol	Six Top Bands Swing Again	1960	Les Brown, Benny Goodman, Glen Gray, Woody Herman, Harry James, Stan Kenton	T 1386	Two O'Clock Jump, Trumpet Blues
MGM	The Starpower Label	1960	Various	MG-DJ-7&8	Rockin' in Rhythm
CRP (Note: CRP - Columbia Record Productions)	Remember How Great...?	1961	Various	—	Ciribiribin
MGM	Music to Your Taste	1963	Various	PM 14	I'm Comin' Virginia
Capitol	Best of the Big Bands	1963	Benny Goodman, Harry James, Glen Gray	TCO 1983 (3x LP)	The Mole, You Made Me Love You, I've Heard That Song Before, Trumpet Blues, Cherry, I'm Beginning to See the Light, Sleepy Lagoon, Two O'Clock Jump, I Cried for You, Music Makers, Velvet Moon, Ciribiribin
Harmony	Theme Songs of the Great Bands, Vol. 1	1965	Various	HL 7336	Ciribiribin (They're So in Love)
Harmony	The Golden Hits of the 40s	1966	Various	HL 7373	I've Heard That Song Before, "It's Been a Long, Long Time"
CSP (Note: CSP - Columbia Special Products)	The Hot Ones	196?	Various	CSP 107	Two O'Clock Jump
CSP	The Big Beat of Yesterday	1968	Various	CSS 809	Sleepy Lagoon
CMT (Note: CMT - Columbia Musical Treasuries)	Remembrance	1968	Various	DS 144	All or Nothing At All, "Yes, Indeed"
CMT	The Best of the Big Band Singers	1968	Various	D 295	I'll Get By (As Long as I Have You), All or Nothing At All, Skylark
CMT	The Best of the Big Band Singers	1968	Various	DS 383	I'll Get By (As Long As I Have You), All Or Nothing At All, I'm Beginning to See the Light
CMT	The Best of the Big Band Singers	1968	Various	D 405	I'll Get By (As Long As I Have You), All Or Nothing At All, I'm Beginning to See the Light
CMT	The Best of the Big Bands	1968	Various	P2M 5111 (2x LP)	You Made Me Love You, Sweet Georgia Brown, Two O'Clock Jump
CMT	Big Bands Revisited	1968	Various	P7S 5122 (8x LP)	Two O'Clock Jump, Skylark, All or Nothing At All, I'll Get By (As Long as I Have You), Trumpet Blues (And Cantabile), Sweet Georgia Brown, You Made Me Love You
CMT	The Best of the Big Bands	1968	Various	P2M 5193 (2x LP)	You Made Me Love You, Two O'Clock Jump, Trumpet Blues (And Cantabile)
CMT	The Great Bands	1968	Various	P2M 5267 (2x LP)	"It's Been a Long, Long Time", Ciribiribin (They're So in Love), My Silent Love, Who Told You I Cared?
CMT	The Swing Years	1968?	Various	P2S 5618 (2x LP)	"It's Been a Long, Long Time", Ciribiribin (They're So in Love), My Silent Love, Who Told You I Cared?
Capitol	The Big Bands	1969	Les Brown, Glen Gray, Duke Ellington, Benny Goodman, Harry James, Woody Herman	STFL 293 (6x LP)	The Mole, You Made Me Love You, I've Heard That Song Before, Trumpet Blues, Cherry, I'm Beginning to See the Light, Sleepy Lagoon, Two O'Clock Jump, I Cried for You, Music Makers, Velvet Moon, Ciribiribin
Pickwick	Kings of Swing!	1971	Various	SPC 3281	The New Two O' Clock Jump
Pickwick	Battle of the Bands!	197?	Woody Herman & His Herd Vs. Harry James & His Music Makers	SPC 3310	James Session, Music Makers, Strictly Instrumental, Moten Swing
Capitol Special Markets	The Greatest Hits of the 40s	1971	Various	SL 6717	Ciribiribin, Sleepy Lagoon
Capitol Special Markets	Best of the Big Band Sound	197?	Various	SL 6742	Moten Swing, I Want a Little Girl
Capitol Special Markets	The Kings of the Big Bands / The Kings of Dixieland	197?	Various	SL 6755	Two O'clock Jump
Reader's Digest	Still Swinging! The Big Bands Play Songs of the 60s	1975	Various	RD 4-034-1	This Guy's in Love with You
CSP	Rare Big Band Gems 1932-1947	1976	Various	P3 13618 (3x LP)	King Porter Stomp, You've Changed, I Don't Care Who Knows It, This Is Always, I've Never Forgotten, What Am I Gonna Do About You?
Realm	Big Bands Forever! Four Kings of Swing, Volume 1	1977	Harry James, Kay Kyser	8064 (2x LP)	I Had the Craziest Dream, Sleepy Lagoon, I've Heard That Song Before, I'll Get By (As Long as I Have You), One Dozen Roses, "It's Been a Long, Long Time", I Can't Begin to Tell You, Ciribiribin (They're So in Love), All or Nothing at All, You Made Me Love You
CSP	Big Band Bash	1979	Various	P6 14954 (6x LP)	Back Beat Boogie, I'm Beginning to See the Light, Two O'Clock Jump, It's Funny to Everyone but Me, Sweet Georgia Brown, Feet Draggin' Blues, Ol' Man River, You Made Me Love You, I Don't Want to Walk Without You, Trumpet Blues (And Cantabile)
Meritt	The Trumpet Album, Vol. 2	1980?	Various	9	Sugar Daddy, Nobody Knows The Trouble I've Seen
Franklin Mint	The Greatest Recordings of the Big Band Era	1980	Horace Heidt, Jack Jenny, Claude Hopkins, Harry James	3/4 (2x LP)	Ciribiribin, All or Nothing At All, Feet Draggin' Blues, Music Makers, Trumpet Rhapsody, Two O'clock Jump, You Made Me Love You, You've Changed, I Don't Want to Walk Without You, Cherry, I've Heard That Song Before, I'm Beginning to See the Light
Columbia	Let's Dance	1980	Harry James, Benny Goodman, Les Brown, Charlie Barnet, Count Basie, Gene Krupa	JC 36580	9:20 Special, You Made Me Love You, Crazy Rhythm
Columbia	Dance The Night Away	1980	Various	JC 36742	I've Heard That Song Before, I'll Get By (As Long As I Have You), Cherry
Columbia	Come Dance with Me	1980	Harry James, Benny Goodman, Les Brown, Charlie Barnet, Gene Krupa	JC 36743	The Mole, I'm Beginning to See the Light, Strictly Instrumental
Joyce	The Big Bands' Greatest Vocalists: Dick Haymes 1941 Vol. 3	1981	Harry James, Benny Goodman, Dick Haymes	6009	I Guess I'll Have to Dream the Rest, Yes Indeed!, It's So Peaceful in the Country, I'll Never Let a Day Pass By, Minka, Rancho Pillow, You've Changed, The Man with the Lollipop Song, The Devil Sat Down and Cried, You Don't Know What Love Is, Day Dreaming
Joyce	The Big Bands' Greatest Vocalists: Ginny Powell	1981?	Ginnie Powell	6020	Do You Love Me?, I've Never Forgotten
CSP	The Best of the Big Bands Vol. 1	1982	Harry James, Benny Goodman	P 16737	Music Makers, Velvet Moon, I Don't Want to Walk Without You, Sweet Georgia Brown
Sony MSP (Note: Sony MSP - Sony Music Special Products)	The Best of the Big Bands Vol. 1	1997	Harry James, Benny Goodman	A 28431	add And The Angels Sing
Franklin Mint	The Greatest Recordings of the Big Band Era	1983	Harry James, Freddie Slack, Bobby Sherwood, Abe Lyman, Dick Stabile	63/64 (2x LP)	9:20 Special, Memphis in June, "It's Been a Long, Long Time", I Can't Begin to Tell You, Friar Rock, Who's Sorry Now?, Easy, Moten Swing, Jalousie, September Song, Snooty Fruity, New Two O'Clock Jump
Smithsonian Collection	Big Band Jazz: from the Beginnings to the Fifties	1983	Various	DMM 6-0610 / R 030 (6x LP)	The Mole, Friar Rock
Joyce	The Big Bands' Greatest Vocalists: Helen Forrest And Willie Smith	1983	Helen Forrest, Willie Smith, Harry James, Larry Clinton	6030	I Heard You Cried Last Night, Manhattan Serenade, My Beloved Is Rugged, I Had The Craziest Dream, Mister Five By Five, I've Heard That Song Before, Do Nothin' Till You Hear From Me, Now We Know, Who's Sorry Now, One More Kiss, Lone Star Moon, Hatsville U.S.A.
Ballad	Curtain Call: The Rare Dick Haymes	1985	Dick Haymes	DHS-8	My Greatest Mistake, Juanita, "Listen, Listen"
Bygone	The Greatest Bands in All the Land	19??	Various	BB/SWNG 1501	"Six, Two and Even", Caravan
Bygone	The Greatest Bands in All the Land	19??	Various	BB/SWNG 1502	Roll 'Em
Columbia Jazz Masterpieces	The 1940s - the Small Groups: New Directions	1988	Harry James, Woody Herman, Gene Krupa	CJ 44222	Pagan Love Song, Tuxedo Junction
Columbia Jazz Masterpieces	Jazz Sampler, Volume V	1988	Various	CJ 44380	Pagan Love Song
Verve	Gitanes Jazz - Big Band	1989	Various	841 453-2	Harlem Nocturne
Columbia	16 Most Requested Songs Of The 1940s, Vol.1	1989	Various	CK 45108	You Made Me Love You (I Didn't Want to Do It), I'm Beginning To See The Light
Columbia / Legacy	Big Band Instrumentals: 16 Most Requested Songs	1992	Various	CK 48977	Ciribiribin, You Made Me Love You
Columbia / Legacy	The Columbia Years 1943-1952: The Complete Recordings	1993	Frank Sinatra	C12K 48673	Castle Rock, "Farewell, Farewell to Love", Deep Night
Columbia / Legacy	Swing Time! The Fabulous Big Band Era 1925-1955	1993	Various	C3K 52862	All Or Nothing At All (v. Frank Sinatra)
Columbia / Legacy	The Best Of The Columbia Years 1943-1952	1995	Frank Sinatra	C4K 64681	Deep Night
Sony MSP	Sentimental Swing	1995	Helen Forrest with Benny Goodman and Harry James	A 26232	Make Love to Me, You're in Love with Someone Else, Mister Five By Five, You're Too Good for Good-for-Nothing Me, I Heard You Cried Last Night
Sony MSP	Serenading with the Big Bands	1995	Dick Haymes with Harry James and Benny Goodman	A 26058	A Sinner Kissed an Angel, Montevideo, You Don't Know What Love Is, Ol' Man River, Day Dreaming, Aurora, I'll Never Let a Day Pass By
Collectors' Choice	The Complete Columbia Recordings	1998	Dick Haymes with Harry James and Benny Goodman	CCM-047-2 (2x CD)	I Never Purposely Hurt You, Montevideo, Ol' Man River, Walkin' by the River, Braggin', Dolores, For Want of a Star, I'll Get By (As Long as I Have You), Juanita (previously unreleased), "Don't Cry, Cherie", Aurora, My Silent Love, Lament to Love, Lost in Love, A Sinner Kissed an Angel, I Guess I'll Have to Dream the Rest, Yes Indeed!, It's So Peaceful in the Country, I'll Never Let a Day Pass By, Rancho Pillow, Minka, You've Changed, The Man with the Lollypop Song, The Devil Sat Down and Cried, You Don't Know What Love Is, Day Dreaming
Verve	Swingin' Talkin' Verve	1998	Various	314 565 390-2	Crazy Rhythm, Back Beat Boogie
Sony	Sony Music 100 Years: Soundtrack For A Century	1999	Various	JXK 65750 / J2K 65788	I'm Beginning To See The Light
Sony MSP	Stage Door Canteen - Songs Of WWII	1999	Various	A 34790	Waitin' For The Train To Come In
Mosaic	The Complete Capitol Recordings of Gene Krupa & Harry James	1999	Gene Krupa and Harry James	MD7-192 (7x CD)	Previously issued tracks from Capitol W-654, W-712, TBO-727, ST-874, F-3849, ST-1037, ST-1093, and Pickwick PC-3006. Previously unissued tracks: Keblah, Beguine, and Ram's Horn.
Capitol	Gene Krupa & Harry James - Capitol Vaults Jazz Series	2012	Gene Krupa and Harry James	—	Previously issued tracks from Capitol W-654, W-712, TBO-727, ST-874, F-3849, ST-1037, ST-1093, and Pickwick PC-3006. Previously unissued tracks: Keblah, Beguine, and Ram's Horn.
Columbia / Legacy	16 Biggest Hits	2000	Rosemary Clooney	CK 63553	"In The Cool, Cool, Cool Of The Evening," You'll Never Know
Collectors' Choice	The Best of Art Lund: Band Singer	2001	Art Lund with Benny Goodman and Harry James	CCM-153-2	I Tipped My Hat (And Slowly Rode Away), What Am I Gonna Do About You?, I Can't Get Up the Nerve to Kiss You
Collectors' Choice	Kitty Kallen – Band Singer	2001	Kitty Kallen with Harry James and Jack Teagarden	CCM-186-2	I'm Beginning to See the Light, Guess I'll Hang My Tears Out to Dry, I Wish I Knew, I Don't Care Who Knows It, 11:60 P.M., "Yah-Ta-Ta, Yah-Ta-Ta (Talk, Talk, Talk)", "Oh, Brother!", I'll Buy That Dream, "It's Been a Long, Long Time", The Wonder of You, Waitin' for the Train to Come, "Baby, What You Do to Me"
Sony MSP	Kitty Kallen – Band Singer	2001	Kitty Kallen with Harry James and Jack Teagarden	A 52049	I'm Beginning to See the Light, Guess I'll Hang My Tears Out to Dry, I Wish I Knew, I Don't Care Who Knows It, 11:60 P.M., "Yah-Ta-Ta, Yah-Ta-Ta (Talk, Talk, Talk)", "Oh, Brother!", I'll Buy That Dream, "It's Been a Long, Long Time", The Wonder of You, Waitin' for the Train to Come, "Baby, What You Do to Me"
Sony MSP	#1 Hits Of The 1940's	2001	Various	A 31445	Sleepy Lagoon
Legacy	Sentimental Journey: Hits From The Second World War	2007	Various	88697 14538 2	I'll Get By, Waiting for the Train to Come In
Legacy	I'm Beginning to See the Light: Dance Hits from The Second World War	2007	Various	88697 14539 2	I'm Beginning to See the Light

=== Singles ===
==== 10" 78 rpm singles ====
Label	Date (Note: Dates in table are in YYYY-MM-DD format where available)	Catalog #	Appearance with / Billed as	Matrix	Title	Peak chart position		
Label	Date	Catalog #	Appearance with / Billed as	Matrix	Title	US	R&B	Date
Brunswick	1937-09-05	7973	Teddy Wilson Quartet	LA1429-A	Just a Mood - Part I	—	—	—
Brunswick	1937-09-05	7973	Teddy Wilson Quartet	LA1430	Just a Mood - Part II	—	—	—
Victor	1939-01-11	26144	Victor All Star Band	031446-1	The Blues - Jam Session At Victor	—	—	—
Victor	1939-01-11	26144	All Star Jam Band	031445-2	Blue Lou	—	—	—
Columbia	1940-02-07	35389	Metronome All Star Nine	26490-A	All Star Strut	—	—	—
Columbia	1940-02-07	35389	Metronome All Star Band	26489-A	King Porter Stomp	—	—	—
Victor	1941-01-16	27314	Metronome All-Star Band	060331-1	Bugle Call Rag	—	—	—
Victor	1941-01-16	27314	Metronome All-Star Band	060332-1	One O'Clock Jump	13	—	1941-04-12
Columbia	1941-12-30	36499	The Metronome All Stars	CO32079-1	Royal Flush	—	—	—

==== 10" 78 rpm and 7" 45 rpm singles ====
Label	Date (Note: Dates in table are recording dates and are in YYYY-MM-DD format where available)	Catalog # 10" 78 rpm	Catalog # 7" 45 rpm	Appearance with / Billed as	Matrix	Title
Columbia	1953-11-12	40134	4-40134	Harry James with The Paul Weston Orchestra	RHCO 10637	O, Mein Papa (Oh! My Papa)
Columbia	1953-11-12	40134	4-40134	Harry James with The Paul Weston Orchestra	RHCO 10638	Serenata

=== 10" 78 rpm and 7" 45 rpm box sets ===
Label	Box Title	Year	Appearance with / Billed as	Format	Catalog #	Disc #	Matrix	Track title
Columbia	Boogie Woogie	1941	Harry James and The Boogie Woogie Trio (Albert Ammons, Pete Johnson, Johnny Williams, Eddie Dougherty), Count Basie, Big Joe Turner, Meade Lux Lewis	10-inch 78 rpm	C-44 (-1)	35958	B 24060	Boo-Woo
Columbia	Boogie Woogie	1941	Harry James and The Boogie Woogie Trio (Albert Ammons, Pete Johnson, Johnny Williams, Eddie Dougherty), Count Basie, Big Joe Turner, Meade Lux Lewis	10-inch 78 rpm	C-44 (-2)	35958	B 24061	Woo-Woo
Columbia	Columbia Presents Theme Songs	1941	Various	10-inch 78 rpm	C-63 (-5)	36226	WB 24514	Ciribiribin
Columbia	Paul Whiteman Selects Records for the Millions	1948	Various	10-inch 78 rpm	C-163 (-5)	38220	CO 35083	Ain't Misbehavin'
Columbia	This Is My Best	1952	Various	7-inch 45 rpm	B-301	4-39739	ZSP4119	You Made Me Love You

=== 7" 45 rpm EPs ===
Label	Title	Year	Appearance with / Billed as	Catalog #	Disc #	Matrix	Track	Track title
Columbia	This Is My Best	1952	Various	B-301	5-1210	ZSP 11594	A2	You Made Me Love You
Columbia	Just a Mood	1952	Teddy Wilson Quartet Starring; Harry James and Red Norvo	B-1569	5-1277	ZSP 12401	A1	Just a Mood
Columbia	Just a Mood	1952	Teddy Wilson Quartet Starring; Harry James and Red Norvo	B-1569	5-1277	ZSP 12402	B1	Ain't Misbehavin'
Columbia	Just a Mood	1952	Teddy Wilson Quartet Starring; Harry James and Red Norvo	B-1569	5-1277	ZSP 12402	B2	Honeysuckle Rose
Columbia	Boogie Woogie	1952	Harry James/Pete Johnson, Harry James/Albert Ammons, Frankie Carle, Will Bradley	B-1611	5-1360	ZSP 11945	B1	Boo-Woo
Columbia	Boogie Woogie	1952	Harry James/Pete Johnson, Harry James/Albert Ammons, Frankie Carle, Will Bradley	B-1611	5-1360	ZSP 11945	B2	Woo-Woo
Columbia	Dance the Fox Trot Vol. 1	1953	Various	B-1744	B-1744	ZEP 14704	A2	I'm Beginning to See the Light
Columbia	Popular Favorites Vol. 9	1954	Various	B-433	5-1982	ZEP 32275	A2	Three Coins in the Fountain
Columbia	Popular Favorites Vol. 9	1954	Various	B-433	5-1982	ZEP 32278	D1	Hernando's Hideaway
Columbia	Popular Favorites Vol. 9	1954	Various	B-433	5-1983	ZEP 32276	B2	The High and the Mighty
Columbia	Popular Favorites Vol. 9	1954	Various	B-433	5-1983	ZEP 32277	C1	Little Things Mean a Lot
Columbia	Vol. 1: Ballroom Bandstand	1955	Various	B-1957	B-1957	ZEP 34233	A1	Two O'Clock Jump
Columbia	Vol. 2: Ballroom Bandstand	1955	Various	B-1958	B-1958	ZEP 34236	B2	Back Beat Boogie
Columbia; Hall of Fame	Frank Sinatra with Harry James and Pearl Bailey	1958	[same as title]	B-2542	B-2542	ZEP 42265	A1	Castle Rock
Columbia; Hall of Fame	Frank Sinatra with Harry James and Pearl Bailey	1958	[same as title]	B-2542	B-2542	ZEP 42265	A2	Farewell, Farewell to Love

== Harry James Orchestra (minus Harry James) ==
=== Albums ===
Label	Title	Year	Catalog #	Track List
Crown	A Tribute to Harry James (Note: Per the liner notes, Charlie Barnet produced these Crown "Charlie Barnet Presents" albums (re-issued by Bright Orange), though he did not play on them. Crown used the musicians from The Harry James Orchestra to create new stereophonic recordings of Harry James's previous releases. Harry James is not listed as a participating musician on the credits, and some of these records credit Maxwell Davis as arranger/conductor. Davis was musical director for Modern/RPM/Crown/Kent Records.)	1958	CST 146	(Charlie Barnet presents, with members of The Harry James Orchestra); Two O'Clock Jump, You Made Me Love You, Cherry, Just Lucky, Palladium, Trumpet Blues, Ultra, Bangtail, Here's One, Ciribiribin
Crown	A Tribute to Harry James	1958	CLP 5114	(Charlie Barnet presents, with members of The Harry James Orchestra); Two O'Clock Jump, You Made Me Love You, Cherry, Just Lucky, Palladium, Trumpet Blues, Ultra, Bangtail, Here's One, Ciribiribin
Bright Orange	The Stereophonic Sound of Harry James	1959	X BO 710	(Charlie Barnet presents, with members of The Harry James Orchestra); Two O'Clock Jump, You Made Me Love You, Cherry, Just Lucky, Palladium, Trumpet Blues, Ultra, Bangtail, Here's One, Ciribiribin
Crown	A Salute to Harry James	1959	CST 160	(Charlie Barnet presents, with members of The Harry James Orchestra); Sleepy Lagoon, Easter Parade, One on the House, Flatbush Flanagan, Music Makers, Backbeat Boogie, The Mole, Blues for Sale
Crown	A Salute to Harry James	1959	CLP 5127	(Charlie Barnet presents, with members of The Harry James Orchestra); Sleepy Lagoon, Easter Parade, One on the House, Flatbush Flanagan, Music Makers, Backbeat Boogie, The Mole, Blues for Sale
Bright Orange	The Stereophonic Sound of Harry James Vol. 2	1959	X BO 715	(Charlie Barnet presents, with members of The Harry James Orchestra); Sleepy Lagoon, Easter Parade, One on the House, Flatbush Flanagan, Music Makers, Backbeat Boogie, The Mole, Blues for Sale
Amp	Harry James Greatest Hits of the Forties	198?	AMP 112	The Man with the Horn, Sleepy Lagoon, I Had the Craziest Dream, Cherry, Trumpet Blues, I've Heard That Song Before, Strictly Instrumental, Two O'Clock Jump, James Session, Velvet Moon

=== Singles ===
Label	Year	Catalog #	Matrix	Title
Modern Oldies	?	45xMX614	BB-45-614-A	You Made Me Love You
Modern Oldies	?	45xMX614	BB-45-614-B	Trumpet Blues
Modern Oldies	?	45xMX615	BB-45-615-A	Cherry
Modern Oldies	?	45xMX615	BB-45-615-B	Two O'Clock Jump
Modern Oldies	?	45xMX616	BB-45-616-A	Backbeat Boogie
Modern Oldies	?	45xMX616	BB-45-616-B	Easter Parade
Modern Oldies	?	45xMX617	BB-45-617-A	Sleepy Lagoon
Modern Oldies	?	45xMX617	BB-45-617-B	Ciribiribin
Modern Oldies	?	45xMX618	BB-45-618-A	Flatbush Flanagan
Modern Oldies	?	45xMX618	BB-45-618-B	Music Makers
