= 1898 in music =

Events in the year 1898 in music.

== Specific locations ==
- 1898 in Norwegian music

== Events ==
- Otilie Dvořáková, daughter of Antonín Dvořák, marries her father's pupil, composer Josef Suk.
- Dame Marie Tempest marries the actor-playwright Cosmo Stuart, grandson of the Duke of Richmond.
- Lorenzo Perosi is appointed Maestro Perpetuo della Cappella Sistina in Rome, an office which he holds until his death in 1956.

== Published popular music ==
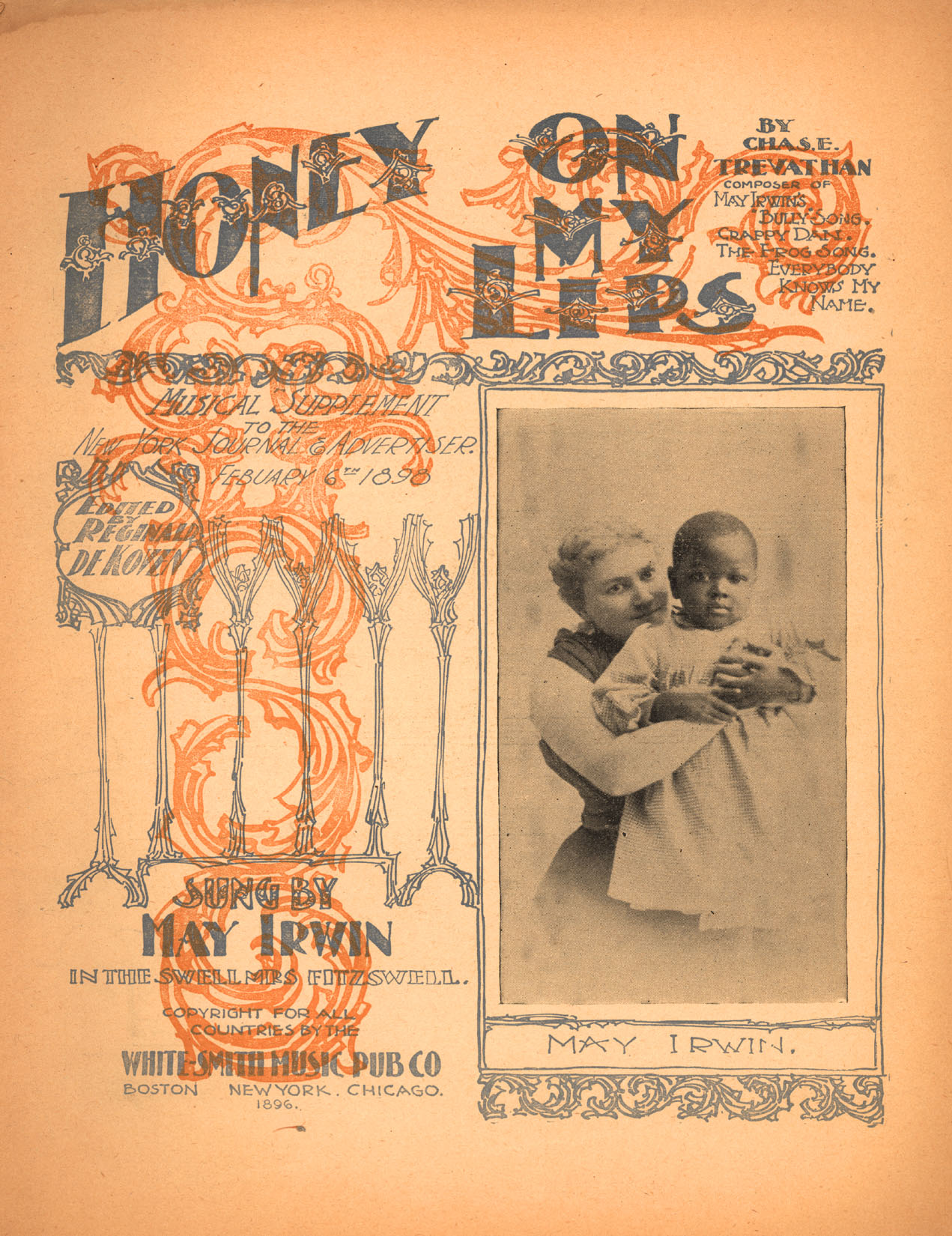

- "Because" w. Charles Horwitz m. Frederick V. Bowers
- "The Boy Guessed Right" w.m. Lionel Monckton
- "Ciribiribin" w. Carlo Tiochet m. Alberto Pestalozza
- "Gold Will Buy Most Anything But A True Girl's Heart" w. Charles E. Foreman m. Monroe H. Rosenfeld
- "Good-bye Dolly Gray" w. Will D. Cobb m. Paul Barnes
- "Goodnight, Little Girl, Goodnight" w. Julai M. Hays m. J. C. Macy
- "Gypsy Love Song" w. Harry B. Smith m. Victor Herbert from the musical The Fortune Teller
- "Honey on my Lips" Charles E. Trevathan
- "I Guess I'll Have To Telegraph My Baby" w.m. George M. Cohan
- "Just As The Sun Went Down" w. Karl Kennett m. Lyn Udall
- "Just One Girl" w. Karl Kennett m. Lyn Udall
- "Kiss Me Honey Do" w. Edgar Smith m. John Stromberg
- "The Lily Of Laguna" w.m. Leslie Stuart
- "'Mid The Green Fields Of Virginia" w.m. Charles K. Harris
- "My Old New Hampshire Home" w. Andrew B. Sterling m. Harry Von Tilzer
- "Recessional" w. Rudyard Kipling m. Reginald De Koven
- "Romany Life" w. Harry B. Smith m. Victor Herbert
- "The Rosary" w. Robert Cameron Rogers m. Ethelbert Nevin
- "She is the Belle of New York" w. Hugh Morton m. Gustave Kerker
- "She Was Bred In Old Kentucky" w. Harry Braisted m. Stanley Carter
- "Swipsy Cakewalk" (for piano) c. Scott Joplin
- "When You Were Sweet Sixteen" w.m. James Thornton

=== Christmas songs ===
- "Nu tändas tusen juleljus", by Emmy Köhler

== Recorded popular music ==
- "The Amorous Goldfish" (w. Harry Greenbank m. Sidney Jones)
  – Syria Lamonte on Berliner Gramophone
- "At A Georgia Camp Meeting" (w.m. Kerry Mills)
  – Sousa's Band on Berliner Gramophone
  – Dan W. Quinn on Columbia Records
- "The Battle Cry Of Freedom" (w.m. George Frederick Root)
  – John Terrell on Berliner Gramophone
- "Believe Me, If All Those Endearing Young Charms" (w. Thomas Moore m. trad)
  – J. W. Myers on Berliner Gramophone
- "Break The News To Mother" (w.m. Charles K. Harris)
  – George J. Gaskin on Edison Records
- "Chin, Chin, Chinaman" (w. Harry Greenbank m. Sidney Jones)
  – James T. Powers on Berliner Gramophone
- "Don Jose Of Sevilla" (Smith, Herbert)
  – Jessie Bartlett Davis & W. H. MacDonald on Berliner Gramophone
- "Happy Days In Dixie" (m. Kerry Mills)
  – Arthur Collins on Edison Records
- "The Harp That Once Thro' Tara's Halls" (w. Thomas Moore m. trad)
  – J. W. Myers on Berliner Gramophone
- "A Hot Time In The Old Town" (w. Joe Hayden m. Theodore A. Metz)
  – Sousa's Band on Berliner Gramophone
  – Roger Harding on Edison Records
- "I'se Gwine Back To Dixie" (w.m. C. A. White)
  – Edison Male Quartette on Edison Records
- "Just Before The Battle, Mother" (w.m. George Frederick Root)
  – Frank C. Stanley on Edison Records
- "Killarney" (w. Edmund Falconer m. Michael William Balfe)
  – Arthur Gladstone on Berliner Gramophone
- "Largo Al Factotum" (w. Cesare Sterbini m. Giaocchino Rossini)
  – Alberto Del Bassini on Berliner Gramophone
- "Love's Old Sweet Song" (w. George Clifton Bingham m. James Lyman Molloy)
  – Annie Carter on Berliner Gramophone
- "The Miner's Dream Of Home" (w.m. Will Godwin & Leo Dryden)
  – Leo Dryden on Berliner Gramophone
- "Mister Johnson Don't Get Gay" (w.m. Dave Reed Jr)
  – Press Eldridge on Edison Records
- "Mister Johnson, Turn Me Loose" (w.m. Ben Harney)
  – Marguerite Newton on Edison Records
  – Len Spencer with Vess L. Ossman on Columbia Records
- "My Old Kentucky Home, Good Night" (w. m. Stephen Collins Foster)
  – Diamond Four on Berliner Gramophone
  – Edison Male Quartette on Edison Records
- "Oh, Promise Me" (w. Clement Scott m. Reginald DeKoven)
  – Jessie Bartlett Davis on Berliner Gramophone
- "Old Folks At Home" (w. m. Stephen Collins Foster)
  – Diamond Four on Berliner Gramophone
- "On The Banks Of The Wabash Far Away" (w.m. Paul Dresser)
  – Annie Carter on Berliner Gramophone
- "Orange Blossoms" (m. Arthur Pryor)
  – Sousa's Band on Berliner Gramophone
- "The Palms" (m. Gabriel Fauré)
  – Diamond Four on Berliner Gramophone
- "Rocked In The Cradle Of The Deep" (w. Mrs Emma Hart Willard m. Joseph Phillip Knight)
  – William Hooley on Edison Records
- "She Never Did the Same Thing Twice"
  – Dan W. Quinn on Berliner Gramophone
- "She Was Bred In Old Kentucky" (w. Harry Braisted m. Stanley Carter)
  – Albert C. Campbell on Edison Records
- "She was Happy Til She Met You"
  – Dan W. Quinn on Columbia Records
  – S. H. Dudley (singer)
- "Smoky Mokes" (m. Abe Holzmann)
  – banjo Vess L. Ossman on Columbia Records
- "Sweet Genevieve" (w. George Cooper m. Henry Tucker)
  – Jessie Bartlett Davis on Berliner Gramophone
- "The Sweetest Story Ever Told" (w.m. R. M. Stults)
  – Diamond Four on Berliner Gramophone
  – George J. Gaskin on Edison Records
- "Then You'll Remember Me" (w. Alfred Bunn m. Michael William Balfe)
  – James Norrie on Berliner Gramophone
  - Annie Carter on Berliner Gramophone
- "There's A Little Star Shining For You" (w.m. James Thornton)
  – Dan W. Quinn on Edison Records
- "Tramp, Tramp, Tramp" (w.m. George Frederick Root)
  – Frank C. Stanley on Edison Records
- "When Johnny Comes Marching Home" (w.m. Louis Lambert)
  – Frank C. Stanley on Edison Records
- "Yankee Doodle" (trad)
  – Frank C. Stanley on Edison Records
- "Zizzy Ze Zum Zum"
  – Arthur Collins

== Classical music ==
- Ernest Chausson – String Quartet (completed posthumously)
- Samuel Coleridge-Taylor
  - Hiawatha's Wedding Feast, Op.30
  - Ballade, Op.33 (premiered September 12 in Gloucester)
  - African Suite for piano, Op.35
- Edward Elgar – Caractacus
- George Enescu
  - Trois melodies sur poèmes de Jules Lemaitre et Sully Prudhomme, for bass and piano, Op. 4
  - Variations for Two Pianos on an Original Theme in A♭ major, for piano, Op. 5
  - Sonata in F minor, for cello and piano, Op. 26, No. 1
- Gabriel Fauré
  - Fantaisie, Op. 79
  - Pelléas et Mélisande, Op. 80
- Alexander Glazunov – Ruses d'Amour (ballet)
- Paul Juon – Sonata for Violin and Piano no. 1 in A major
- Carl Nielsen – String Quartet No. 3 in E flat major
- Henryk Melcer-Szczawiński – Piano Concerto No. 2 in C minor
- Henrique Oswald
  - Cello Sonata No. 1 in D minor, Op. 21
  - Piano Quartet No. 2 in G major, Op. 26
- Camille Saint-Saëns – Barcarolle in F major
- Christian Sinding – Concerto for Violin in A major

== Opera ==
- Francisco Braga – Jupyra
- Samuel Coleridge-Taylor – The Gitanos
- Umberto Giordano – Fedora
- Pietro Mascagni – Iris
- Emile Pessard – La dame de trèfle premiered on May 13 at the Bouffes-Parisiens, Salle Choiseul, Paris
- Nikolai Rimsky-Korsakov
  - Boyarinya Vera Sheloga
  - Sadko, premiered January 7 at the Solodovnikov Theatre in Moscow.

== Musical theater ==
- The Belle of New York London production
- The Bride Elect Broadway production
- The Fortune Teller Toronto and London productions
- A Greek Slave London production
- Hurly-Burly Broadway production
- A Runaway Girl London and Broadway productions
- The Skirt Dancer London production
- Véronique (operetta) (André Messager) – Paris production

== Births ==
- January 7 – Al Bowlly, big band singer
- January 9 – Gracie Fields, singer and actress
- January 28 – Vittorio Rieti, composer
- February 3 – Lil Hardin Armstrong, wife and musical collaborator of Louis Armstrong
- February 7 – Dock Boggs, banjo player
- February 12 – Roy Harris, composer
- February 15 – Totò, actor and composer
- February 28 – Molly Picon, Broadway star
- March 4 – Robert Schmertz, American folk musician and architect (d. 1975)
- April 3 – George Jessel, American actor, singer & songwriter
- April 9 – Paul Robeson, singer
- May 14 – Zutty Singleton, jazz drummer
- May 15 – Arletty, actress and singer
- May 26 – Ernst Bacon, pianist and composer (d. 1990)
- May 28 – Andy Kirk, jazz musician
- June 6 – Ninette de Valois, founder of the UK's Royal Ballet
- June 29 – Yvonne Lefébure, French pianist
- July 4 – Gertrude Lawrence, English actress, singer and dancer
- July 6 – Hanns Eisler, composer
- July 15 – Noel Gay, English songwriter
- August 2 – Anthony Franchini, Italian-born guitarist
- August 15 – Charles Tobias, US songwriter and singer
- August 24 – Fred Rose, songwriter, music publisher
- September 1
  - Marilyn Miller, US actress, singer and dancer
  - Violet Carson, actress, singer and pianist
- September 26 – George Gershwin, US composer
- September 27 – Vincent Youmans, US composer
- October 7 – Alfred Wallenstein, US cellist and conductor
- October 8 – Clarence Williams, US jazz pianist and composer
- October 18 – Lotte Lenya, singer and actress, wife of Kurt Weill
- November 1 – Sippie Wallace, blues singer
- December 3 (n.s.) – Lev Knipper, Russian composer (and NKVD agent)
- December 5 – Grace Moore, operatic soprano
- December 14 – Lillian Randolph, actress and singer
- December 24 – Baby Dodds, jazz drummer

== Deaths ==
- January 7 – Heinrich Lichner, composer, 68
- January 8 – Alexandre Dubuque, composer, 85
- January 16 – Antoine François Marmontel, pianist and teacher, 81
- January 23 – Augusta Albertini, English soprano, 74
- February 15 – Franz Behr, composer (b. 1837)
- March 11 – Tigran Chukhajian, conductor and composer, founder of the first opera institution in the Ottoman Empire, 60
- March 15 – Julius Schulhoff, pianist and composer, 72
- March 28 – Anton Seidl, conductor, 47
- April 21 – Théodore Gouvy, composer, 78
- May 15 – Ede Reményi, violinist, 70
- May 16 – Jean Antoine Zinnen, composer of the Luxembourg national anthem, 71
- August 14 – John Comfort Fillmore, American music educator, organist, arranger, and ethnomusicologist, 55
- August 17 – Karl Zeller, Austrian composer, 56 (pneumonia)
- August 21 – Niccolò van Westerhout, composer, 40 (peritonitis)
- September 9 – William Chatterton Dix, hymn-writer, 61
- September 11 – Adolphe Samuel, Belgian composer, 74
- November 7 – Max Alvary, operatic tenor, 42
- December 13 – George Frederick Bristow, composer, 72
- December 29 – Georg Goltermann, cellist and composer, 74

== See also ==
- 1898
- list of years in music
