= List of compositions by Henrique Oswald =

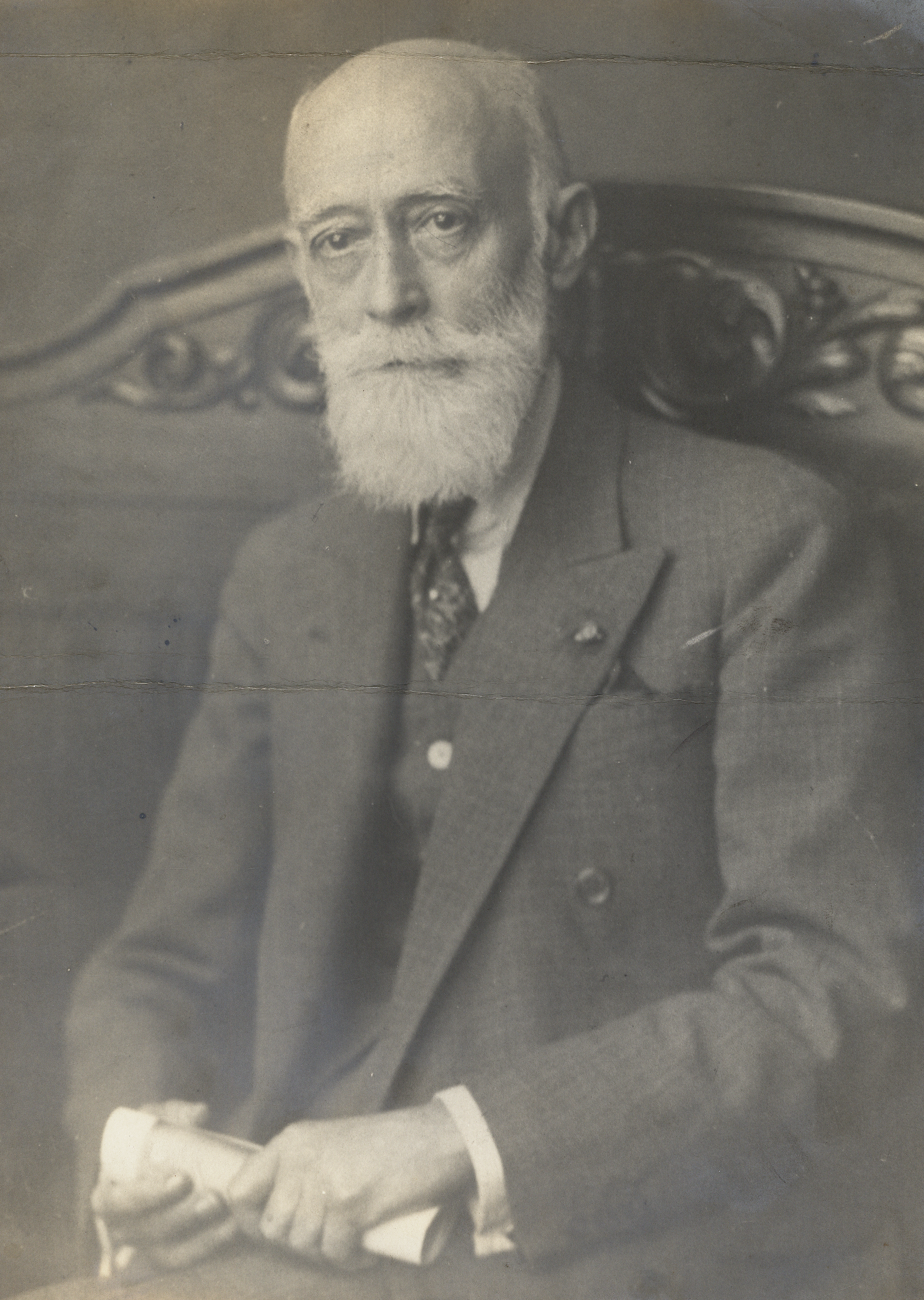

This is a list of compositions by Henrique Oswald, by genre.

== Opera ==
- La croce d'oro [The Golden Cross], 3 acts (1872, unpublished, performances unknown)
- Il Neo (La mouche), Novelletta musicale in 3 piccoli quadri, 1 act (1900, libretto by Eduardo Filippi, after La mouche by Alfred de Musset; unpublished, performed in 1900?, 1925, 1929?; 1950 and/or 1952; 1954)
- Le Fate, Fiaba musicale in due parti [The Fairies], 2 acts, (1902–03, libretto by Eduardo Filippi; unpublished, performances unknown)

== Vocal with orchestra ==
- Invocação à arte [Invocation of the arts], for chorus and orchestra (1917)
- L'enseigne [The ensign], for solo voice and orchestra, in three parts (1917, French text by Jacques d'Avray, pseud. of José de Freitas Vale; there is a version of II arranged for voice and piano)
1. L'aveugle in G minor
2. Le troubadour in C major
3. L'enamourée in B♭ minor

== Sacred Music (complete list) ==
For mixed chorus

- Mass in C minor (Missa Solene) – SATB chorus, string orchestra, organ (1925, edited by Vasti Atique Ferraz de Toledo, 2009; there is a manuscript version omitting orchestra)
- Requiem in E minor (Missa de Réquiem) – SATB chorus, organ ad lib. (1925; edited by Susana Cecilia Igayara, 2001)
- Pater noster – SATB chorus, harmonium ad lib. (1926)
- Tantum ergo – SATB chorus, harmonium ad lib. (1930)

For female chorus

- 3 Motets for female chorus (1913, the grouping proposed by Susana Cecilia Igayara)
  - Ave Maria – SSAA chorus, harmonium ad lib.
  - Magnificat – SSAA chorus, harmonium ad lib.
  - O salutaris hostia – SSAA chorus, harmonium / SSAA chorus, string orchestra, organ
- 3 Motets for female chorus (1930, the grouping proposed by Susana Cecilia Igayara)
  - Tantum ergo – SSA chorus, harmonium
  - Veni Sancte Spiritus – SSA chorus, harmonium
  - Memorare – SSAA chorus, harmonium

For male chorus

- 3 Motets for male chorus (1930, a version of the same motets for female chorus)
  - Tantum ergo – TTB chorus, harmonium
  - Veni Sancte Spiritus – TTB chorus, harmonium
  - Memorare – TTBB chorus, harmonium

Unfinished

- Te Deum (only one-page sketch)

== Symphony orchestra ==
=== Original compositions ===
- Suite d'orchestre (1884; dedicated to Pedro II of Brazil; unpublished; autograph marked Op.1)
- 'Festa', Symphonic poem (1885)
- Sinfonietta (Sinfonia) in D minor op. 27 (1897; edited as Sinfonia, Op. 27, in 2001)
- Symphonia in C major op. 43 (1910–11)
- Prelude and Fugue in D minor
- Prelude and Fugue in B minor

=== Transcriptions for symphony orchestra ===
- Nocturno op. 6 nº 2
- 4º Nocturno
- Elegía (1896)
- Paysage d'automne
- En rêve
- Il neige!..
- Idylle op. 33 nº 2
- Sur la plage op. 33 nº 1

== String orchestra ==
=== Original compositions ===
- Prelude and Fugue in C minor
- 6 Fugues
- Gavotte in F♯ minor
- Minuet in D major
- Sarabande
- Scherzo
- 2 Romances
- Habanera in G major
- Prelude and Fugue in A♭ major
- Prelude and Fugue in A minor

=== Transcriptions for string orchestra ===
- Sonhando
- Bebé S'endort op. 36 nº 1
- Serenade

== Concertante ==
- Violin concerto in D minor (ca.1888; edited by M.G. Felice, 1997)
- Piano Concerto in G minor, op. 10 (1890; dedicated to Giuseppe Buonamici)
- Andante and Variations (Andante e Variações) in E♭ minor for piano and orchestra (1918; edited by Eduardo Monteiro, 2002)

== Chamber works ==
=== Violin and piano ===
- Violin Sonata in E major op. 36 (finished February 14, 1908)
- Canto elegíaco (1902)
- 3 Berceuses
- 2 Romances op. 37 (pub. 1908)
- Romance in E major op. 7 no. 2 (arranged from piano solo version; edited by Juliana D'Agostini and Eduardo Monteiro, 2007)
- Molto adagio
- Noturne

=== Cello and piano ===
- Cello Sonata in D minor op. 21 (1898, pub. 1982 by José Eduardo Martins; a second version of 1901 exists in autograph manuscript; a 1901 manuscript arrangement for double bass edited by Fausto Borém De Oliveira, 1993)
- Sonata-Fantasia in E♭ major op. 44 (1915/1916, pub. 1982 by José Eduardo Martins; may be only the first movement of a not realized longer sonata)
- Elegy in F♯ minor (1898)
- Berceuse (1898)
- Sognando in F [sic] major op. 3 no. 2 (arranged from piano solo version)

=== Other with piano ===
- Piano Trio in G minor op. 9 – piano, violin, cello (1889; edited by Helcio Vaz do Val, 2012)
- Piano Trio in D major op. 28 – piano, violin, cello (1897)
- Piano Trio in B minor op. 45 – piano, violin, cello (1916, published ca.1917/18)
- Sonatina (Piccolo trio) in F♯ minor – piano, violin, cello
- 'Serrana' in F major – piano, violin, cello (1918/1925, published 1927)
- Piano Quartet No. 1 (Piccolo Quartetto) in F♯ minor, op. 5 – piano, violin, viola, cello (1888)
- Piano Quartet No. 2 in G major op. 26 – piano, violin, viola, cello (second half of 1898; dedicated to Emilio Giorgetti; published by José Eduardo Martins, 2001)
- Piano Quintet in C major op. 18 – piano, 2 violins, viola, cello (1894/5, published 1937 by Luiz Heitor Corrêa de Azevedo; dedicated to Signora Karl Hillebrand)

=== Other without piano ===
- String Quartet No. 1 (Sonatina) op. 16 – 2 violins, viola, cello
- String Quartet No. 2 in E minor (Quarteto Brasileiro) op. 17 – 2 violins, viola, cello
- String Quartet No. 3 op. 39 – 2 violins, viola, cello (1908; dedicated to Francisco Braga)
- String Quartet No. 4 in C minor op. 46 – 2 violins, viola, cello (finished in July–August 1921)
- String Quartet op. 47 – 2 violins, viola, cello (June 1927, incomplete, 2 unfinished versions)
- 'Estudio-scherzo' in B♭ minor for string quartet
- String Octet – 4 violins, 2 violas, 2 cellos (1899/1900)

== Organ ==
- Fuga in E minor
- Petite maítrise fuga
- Prelúdio in A minor
- Prelúdio e Fuga in A♭ major
- Prelúdio e Fuga in B♭ minor
- Prelúdio e Fuga in F major
- Sonata in C major (1925, pub. 1931 by Ricordi)

== Piano ==
=== Published ===
- Souveir-Polka in E♭ major, op. 1
- Macchiette, op. 2 (12 pieces in 4 books): Le campane della sera, Scherzo, Valzer lento, Canzonetta, Ninna-nanna, Marcia, Romanza, Seconda Gavotta, Pastorale, Minuetto, Sarabanda, La caccia (published by Venturini)
- Pagine d'album (Fogli d'album), op. 3: Preludio, Sognando, Improptu, In Hamac, Romanza, Scherzo (no. 2 is 1885; published by Venturini)
  - No. 2 arranged for cello and piano
- Six Morceaux, op. 4: Valse, Rêverie, Menue, Berceuse, Barcarola, Impromptu (published by Venturini)
- Deux Nocturnes, op. 6 (published by Venturini)
- Trois Romances sans paroles, op. 7 (ca.1888; published by Venturini; dedicated to Mr. le Comte Alexandre Sigray de San Marzano)
  - No. 2 was arranged for violin and piano
- Trois Morceaux, op. 8: Valse, Polonaise, Tarantelle
- Deux Valses Caprice, op. 11 (published by Venturini)
- Quatre Morceaux, op. 12: Sérénade, Valse Impromptu, Berceuse, Tarantelle (published by Venturini)
- Seis peças para piano, op. 14: Berceuse, Mazurka, Tarantella, Barcarola, Noturno, Scherzo
- Sept Miniatures, op. 16: Confidência, Mazurka, Travessa, Ingenuidade, Doce Aflição, Saudade, Capricho
- Impromptu, op. 19
- Feuilles d´Album, op. 20: Inquietude, Chansonette, Feux Follets, Désir Ardent
- Trois Morceaux, op. 23: Menuet, Romance, Valse
- Deux Valses, op. 25
- Album, op. 32: Romance, Valse, Sérénade, Menuet
- Album, op. 33: Sur la Plage, Idyle, Pierrot
- Polonaise, op. 34 No. 1
- Album, op. 36: Bébé s'endort, Pierrot se Meurt, Chauve-Sourris
- Edição Escolar: Pequena Marcha, Valsa, Primeira Marcha, Segunda Marcha, Gavotta, Triste, Chansonette, Folha d' Album, Valsa Lenta, Mazurka, Tarantella, Scherzando.
- Un Revê
- En Nacelle
- Sérénade Grise
- Sérénade
- Serenatella
- Il neige!..
- Valsa lenta op. posth.
- Trois Études op. 42
- Estudo (posthumous edition)
- Étude pour la main gauche (1921, pub.1982)
- Scherzo-Étude (1902, pub. 1982)
- Variações sobre um tema de Barrozo Netto (1918/1919)

=== Unpublished ===
- Mazurka (1872)
- Barcarola No.2 (1872)
- Marcia religiosa (1873)
- Berceuse orientale (ca.1870s)
- Quand te reverrais-je? (1876)
- Romance sans paroles (1876)
- 3 Romances sans paroles (1878): Bonheur, Agitato, La plante [?] / La houle [?]
- Nocturne (1883)
- Menueto (1883)
- Gavotte (1883)
- Berceuse (1886)
- Lento e espressivo (1887)
- Vivacissimo (1887)
- Tema e variações
- Marchons
- Molto allegro
- Hino da família Oswald unida (1907)

== Voice with piano (complete list) ==
First period (1872–1879)

- Ave Maria in F major, for voice and piano or harmonium (1872, Latin text; pub. by Bevilacqua, dedicated to Oswald's mother; new version for mezzo-soprano 1876)
- Romanza in C major (1879, Italian text by Oswald's father-in-law Ottavio Gasperini; inedited)
- Romanza in C minor (1879, Italian text by Oswald's wife Laudomia; inedited, only incomplete manuscript)
- Stornello in E♭ minor (1879, Italian text by Oswald's wife Laudomia; inedited)
- Berceuse in B major (1879, French text by Oswald's wife Laudomia; inedited)

Second period (1897–1904)

- Ave! in D♭ major (1897, Italian text by Solone Monti; dedicated to Sophia da Silva Prado; published without publisher name)
  - Ave! (version in Portuguese; first performed on September 2, 1903 by Ottavio Frosini in Rio de Janeiro; published by Ricordi Brasileira)
- Habanera in E minor (1898, Portuguese text by unknown author; inedited)
- Non ti svegliar in G♭ major (1900, Italian text by Eduardo Filippi; arrangement of a Berceuse from Oswald's opera Il Neo; first performed on September 2, 1903 by Ottavio Frosini in Rio de Janeiro; published by Bevilacqua in supplement to Renascença No. 1, 1904)
- Ophelia (Ofélia), Poemetto lirico, in 5 parts (1901, Italian text by Solone Monti; first performed: IV–V on November 13, 1903, I on November 16, 1903, complete cycle on October 29, 1905; published by Genesio Venturini, 1904; III and V were orchestrated by Oswald; manuscripts of I, III an V are marked Op.31)
  1. (no title) in A♭ major
  2. Ophelia in D major
  3. Il genio della foresta in E♭ minor
  4. L'angelo del cimitero in G♭ major
  5. La morta in E major
- A Anunciação in E♭ minor (1903, Portuguese text by Coelho Neto; part of Neto's Partoral with music by four different composers: Prelúdio by Santana Gomes, A Anunciação by Oswald, A Visitação by Francisco Braga and Natal by Alberto Nepomuceno; published by Bevilacqua, 1904)

Third period (1910–1921)

- Minha estrela in E♭ major (1916; Portuguese text by Esther Ferreira Vianna; dedicated to singer Frederico Nascimento Filho; first performed on August 10, 1916 by Carlos de Carvalho in Rio de Janeiro; published by Bevilacqua; a manuscript with orchestrated version exists)
- Aos sinos! in D♭ major (1916, Portuguese text by Olavo Bilac; dedicated to Carlos de Carvalho; first premiered by him in August 1916 in Rio de Janeiro; published by Bevilacqua)
- Cantiga bohemia in A minor (1916; Portuguese text by Olegário Mariano; dedicated to Carlos de Carvalho; first premiered by him in August 1916 in Rio de Janeiro; inedited)
- Le troubadour in C major (1917, French text by Jacques d'Avray, pseud. of José de Freitas Vale; arrangement of second part of Oswald's L'enseigne for voice and orchestra; inedited)
- Mendigo! in D♭ major (1921, Portuguese text by unknown author; inedited)

Works without artistic pretenses

- Ad una rondinella in E♭ major (1874, Italian text by unknown author; dedicated to Maria Tosi; inedited)
- Cris du coeur in B♭ major (undated; French text by unknown author; Oswald's authourship is dubious; piano part in pencil; inedited)
- Hino para a 1a comunhão in E♭ major (undated; Portuguese text by Maria Gertrudes Bicalho Oswald; inedited)
- Hynno in B♭ major (undated; Portuguese text by count Affonso Celso; dedicated to Cardeal Arcoverde; inedited)
- Les adieux fraternels in F major (undated; French text by unknown author; piano part not composed; Oswald's authourship is dubious; inedited)
- Vêm às nossas mãos floridas... in F major (undated; Portuguese text by unknown author; at two points a chorus is indicated; inedited)
- Canto da coroação in C major (1919; Portuguese text by unknown author; dedicated to Antonio Pinto, vicar of Campo Grande; inedited)

== Sources consulted ==
- José Eduardo Martins (1995). Henrique Oswald: músico de uma saga romântica. EdUSP. pp. 199–201. ISBN 978-85-314-0302-6.
- Miguel Ficher; Martha Furman Schleifer; John M. Furman (16 October 2002). Latin American Classical Composers: A Biographical Dictionary. Scarecrow Press. p. 414. ISBN 978-1-4616-6911-1.
- LATIN AMERICAN & HISPANIC-AMERICAN ORGAN MUSIC: Compiled by James Welch and Calvert Johnson, 2008
- Cássia Paula Fernandes Bernardino. Ofélia, poemeto lírico de Henrique Oswald: confluências entre música e texto. São Paulo, 2009
- Susana Cecilia Igayara. Henrique Oswald e a música vocal. Revista Glosas. Revista do Movimento Patrimonial pela Música Portuguesa, v. 9, p. 19-25. Setembro 2015.
