= Napoleão =

Napoleão is a Portuguese surname. Notable people with the surname include:

- Alfredo Napoleão (1852–1917), Portuguese pianist and composer
- Annibal Napoleão (1845 or 1846–1880), Portuguese pianist and composer
- Arthur Napoleão dos Santos (1843–1925), Portuguese composer, pianist, instrument dealer and music publisher
- Juventina Napoleão (born 1988), East Timorese long-distance runner
- Pedro Luiz Napoleão Chernoviz (1812–1882), Polish-Brazilian physician, scientific writer and publisher
- Sérgio Manuel Napoleão Ferreira (1946–2006), Portuguese–Cape Verdean writer and filmmaker

== See also ==
- Gloria Groove (born 1995), Brazilian drag queen, singer, rapper, songwriter and actor
