= Le Fate =

Le Fate (Ital. The Fairies) may refer to:

- Le Fate (opera) by Henrique Oswald (1902–1903)
- Le Fate, a 1966 Italian comedy film distributed in the UK as Sex Quartet
