= Henrique Oswald =

Brazilian composer and pianist (1852–1931)

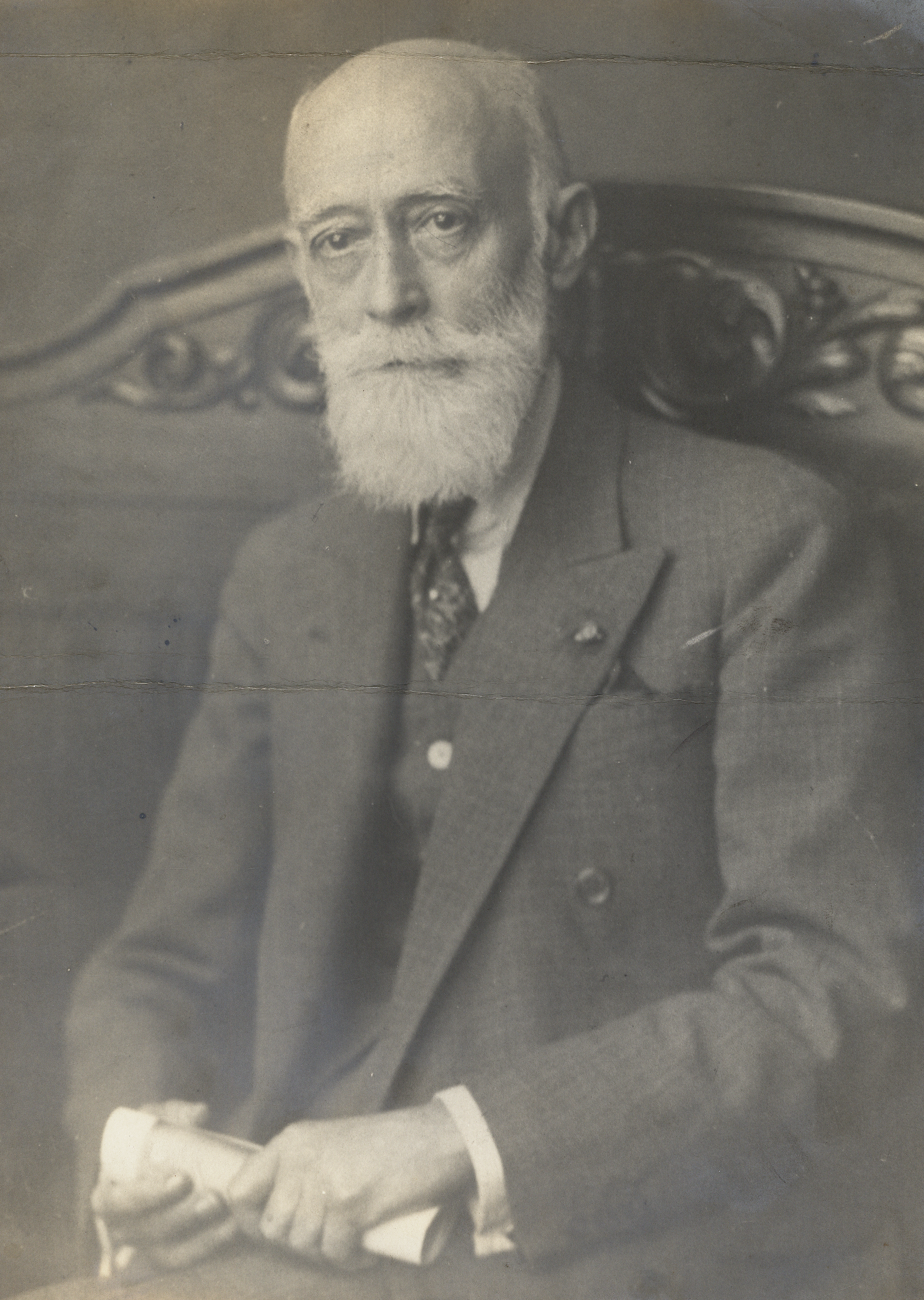
- Born: 14 April 1852; Rio de Janeiro, Empire of Brazil
- Died: 9 June 1931 (aged 79); Rio de Janeiro, Brazil
- Occupations: Composer; pianist
- Works: List of compositions

Henrique José Pedro Maria Carlos Luis Oswald (April 14, 1852 – June 9, 1931) was a Brazilian composer and pianist.

== Biography ==
Oswald was born in Rio de Janeiro. His father was a Swiss-German immigrant and his mother from Italy. The family name was changed from "Oschwald" due to concerns of discrimination. In 1854 the Oswald family moved to São Paulo. His mother taught music privately to aristocrats and by age twelve he had his first recital. In São Paulo, he also studied with Gabriel Guiraudon. His "farewell recital" occurred at age 16, after which he went to study in Europe, spending several years in Florence.

In 1902 he won a piano composition competition sponsored by Le Figaro with a piece Il neige!.. ("It's snowing!"). He then left his family in Europe (they moved to Brazil much later) and from 1903 to 1906 directed the Instituto Nacional de Música in Rio de Janeiro. He also served as Brazilian consul in both The Hague and Genoa.

He died in 1931, just several days after his birthday festivities.

== Family ==
Oswald came from a family of musicians, with both of his parents being musicians, as well as his daughter, Mima Oswald.

== Works ==
Oswald's best-known compositions today are numerous small pieces for piano (usually arranged by him into small collections). However, he was a prolific composer of chamber music: his list includes a violin sonata, 2 cello sonatas (Op. 21 and Op. 44), 3 piano trios, 2 piano quartets (Op. 5 and Op. 26), a piano quintet (Op. 18), 4 string quartets (Op. 16, Op. 17, Op. 39, Op. 46) and a string octet. For orchestra he wrote a suite, a sinfonietta and a symphony. There are also two concertos by him, one for piano, another for violin. Concerning vocal music, he composed three operas (La Croce d’oro, Il Neo and Le Fate), a mass and a requiem. By the time of his death, his major works remained unpublished, a fact that contributed much to the neglect of his for half a century.

His work fell into disfavor after the "Semana de Arte Moderna" manifesto, but has experienced something of a revival recently. In late 1970s Brazilian musician José Eduardo Martins began his struggle to revive Oswald's output. In the last 30 years he published some compositions of him and recorded many of his major works along with piano miniatures. Among his recordings is Oswald's Piano Concerto in an originally arranged chamber version (piano with string quintet). Another Oswald pioneer is pianist Eduardo Monteiro, whose thesis was dedicated to this composer. He recorded some works of him, most notably the Andante and Variations for piano and orchestra in a performing version prepared by the pianist himself. In Europe Oswald is known much less. A CD of his piano works was issued in 1995 by Marco Polo. It was followed in 2014 and 2015 by a Naxos and a Grand Piano CDs. His Piano Concerto was recorded for Hyperion's Romantic Piano Concerto series (Vol. 64, paired with one by Alfredo Napoleão). A good part of Oswald's chamber music was collected in one CD set for the first time by ArsBrasil ensemble.

== Discography ==
- (1958/1969) Henrique Oswald: Sinfonia, op. 43 – Orquestra Sinfônica Brasileira, Edoardo de Guarnieri – Festa IG 79,021 / LDR-5.016 (LP)
  - (2009) Available for digital download from Tratore
- (1964) Henrique Oswald: Quinteto em Dó Maior opus 18; Oscar Lorenzo Fernández: Trio Brasileiro opus 32 – Conjunto de Música de Câmara de São Paulo: Fritz Jank (piano), Gino Alfonsi (violin I), Alexandre Schauffmann (violin II), Johannes Oelsner (viola), Calixto Corazza (cello) – Chantecler Internacional CMG 1024 (LP)
  - (2003?) Reissued on CD: Grandes pianistas brasileiros, Vol. 11: Fritz Jank (includes also Paulistanas by Cláudio Santoro) – MCD World Music MC 022 (CD)
- (1971) Heitor Villa-Lobos: Quarteto No. 16; Henrique Oswald: Quarteto Brasileiro – Quarteto Brasileiro da UFRJ – CBS 160174 (LP)
  - Reissued on CD: Boccherini, Siquera, Henrique Oswald, Villa-Lobos – Quarteto Brasileiro da UFRJ – ? (CD)
- (1979) Documentos da Música Brasileira, Vol. 5: Henrique Oswald: Trio Op. 45; Bruno Kiefer: Trio – Trio Da Rádio MEC: Anselmo Zlatopolsky (violin), Iberê Gomes Grosso (cello), Alceo Bocchino (piano) – Promemus 356-404-001 (LP, issue of an earlier archive recording)
- (1979) Documentos da Música Brasileira, Vol. 11: Honorina Silva Interpreta Henrique Oswald – Honorina Silva (piano) – Promemus 356.404.013 (LP, issue of an earlier archive recording)
- (1979) Henrique Oswald (Il Neige!, Valse op. 25 n° 1, Noturno op. 14 nº 5, Berceuse, Scherzo-Étude), Claude Debussy (Danse Bohèmienne, Danse, D’un Cahier d’Esquises, Page d’Album, Masques, L’isle Joyeuse) e Tsuna Iwami (Algo Sutil e Profundo, Idade Madura, O Mar) – José Eduardo Martins (piano) – (LP)
- (1983) Henrique Oswald: Integral para violoncelo e piano; obras para piano solo – Antônio del Claro (cello), José Eduardo Martins (piano) – Funarte 3.56.502.001 (2 LPs)
- (1984) Henrique Oswald: Música de câmara Vol. 1: Quinteto para piano e cordas op. 18, Quarteto para cordas op. 46 – Elias Slon (violin I), Jorge Salim (violin II), Michel Verebes (viola), Kim Cook (cello), José Eduardo Martins (piano) – BASF 004 (LP)
- (1988) Henrique Oswald: Trio em Sol menor op. 9; Sonata em Mi maior op. 36 – Elisa Fukuda (violin), Antônio del Claro (cello), José Eduardo Martins (piano) – Funarte, Promemus MMB 88.057-1988 (LP)
  - (ca.1999) Reissued on CD: Acervo Funarte da Música Brasileira: Henrique Oswald – Atração Fonográfica ATR32046 (CD)
- (1995) Henrique Oswald: [Complete] Music for violin and piano – Paul Klinck (violin), José Eduardo Martins (piano) – PKP Produkties PKP 007 (CD)
- (1995) Henrique Oswald: Piano music – Maria Inês Guimarães (piano) – Marco Polo 8.223639 (CD)
- (1999) Brasil 500: Henrique Oswald [Quinteto op. 18]; Luís de Freitas Branco [Quarteto] – Luiz de Moura Castro (piano), Quarteto de Brasília: Ludmila Vinecka (violin I), Claudio Cohen, (violin II), Glesse Collet (viola), Guerra Vicente (cello) – no label (CD)
- (2001) Henrique Oswald: Música de câmara para violoncelo e piano: Berceuse; Elegia; Sonata op. 21; Sonata-Fantasia op. 44 – duoCERVALI: Milene Aliverti (cello) and Lucia Cervini (piano) – Apoio FAPESP (CD, uncommercial)
- (2001) Violin music in Brazil: Villa-Lobos, Krieger, Oswaldo [Violin Sonata, Op. 36], Miranda – Claudio Cruz (violin), Nahim Marun (piano) – Dynamic CDS354 (CD)
- (2003) Leopoldo Miguez: Suíte à Antiga, Op. 25 etc.; Henrique Oswald: En rêve; Andante con variazioni for piano and orchestra – Eduardo Monteiro, Orquestra Sinfónica da Escola de Música da UFRJ, André Cardoso – UFRJ Música (CD)
- (2003) Henrique Oswald: Quarteto para piano e cordas op. 26, Sonata-Fantasia para violoncelo e piano op. 44, Concerto para piano e orquestra op. 10 (em versão para piano e quinteto de cordas realizada pelo autor) – Quarteto Rubio, Pascal Smets (double bass), José Eduardo Martins (piano) – Música de Concerto MC004 (CD)
- (2006) Henrique Oswald, Alberto Nepomuceno: Música Sacra [Oswald's Missa de Réquiem, 6 motets] – Calíope, Julio Moretzsohn – Rádio MEC rm 00026 (CD)
- (2010) O Piano Intimista de Henrique Oswald (Machiette op. 2; Variações sobre um tema de Barrozo Netto; Tre Piccoli Pezzi; Berceuse - à mia carissima madre; Estudo-Scherzo; Étude pour la main gauche; Six Morceaux op. 4; Polonaise op. 34 no. 1) – José Eduardo Martins (piano) – ABM Digital RF00124 (CD)
- (2010/2011) Henrique Oswald: Música de câmara (Integral dos quartetos de cordas; Integral dos quartetos com piano; Quinteto com piano Op. 18; Trio com piano Op. 45; Sonata-Fantasia Op. 44; Elegia para cello e piano) – ArsBrasil (violin: Artur Roberto Huf, Samuel Lima; viola: André Rodrigues, Valdeci Merquiori; cello: Gêneses Oliveira, Mauro Brucoli, Renato Oliveira), Fernando Lopes (piano) – Ariah Cultural (3 CDs)
- (2011) Henrique Oswald: Trio em sol menor, Opus 9; Anton Arensky: Trio em ré menor, Opus 32 – Trio Brandão-Kiun: Maria Ester Brandão (violin), Maria Alice Brandão (cello), Olga Kiun (piano) – no label TBK001 (CD)
- (2013) Brasilianische Kammermusik: Oswald [Piano trio Op. 28; Sonatina for piano trio], Nepomuceno, Mignone, Camargo Guarnieri, Gallet – Katharina Uhde (violin), Tatjana Uhde (cello), Michael Uhde (piano) – no label (CD)
- (2013) Henrique Oswald: Música de câmara (Quinteto para piano e cordas, op. 18; Quarteto para piano e cordas, op. 26; Piccolo trio para violino, violoncelo e piano; Elegia para violoncelo e piano; Canto elegíaco para violino e piano) – Eduardo Monteiro (piano), Betina Stegmann (violin), Nelson Rios (violin), Marcelo Jaffé (viola), Robert Suetholz (cello) – LAMI 012 (CD)
- (2013) Henrique Oswald: Piano music – Bras Velloso (piano) – Naxos 9.70200 (CD)
- (2014) Henrique Oswald: Quarteto com piano, op. 26; Quinteto com piano, op. 18 – Ricardo Castro (piano), Quarteto OSESP: Emmanuele Baldini (violin), Davi Graton (violin), Peter Pas (viola, Quarteto), Cláudio Cruz (viola, Quinteto), Johannes Gramsch (cello) – OSESP Selo Digital 6 (digital release)
- (2014) The Romantic Piano Concerto, Vol. 64: Henrique Oswald & Alfredo Napoleão: Piano concertos – Artur Pizarro, BBC National Orchestra of Wales, Martyn Brabbins – Hyperion CDA67984 (CD)
- (2015) Henrique Oswald: Piano works – Sergio Monteiro (piano) – Grand Piano GP682 (CD)
- (2015) Metamorfora: Works for double bass and piano (Boccherini, Sallinen, Beethoven, Oswald [Cello Sonata, Op. 21, transposed to E minor], Proto) – Marcos Machado (double bass), Ney Fialkow (piano) – Blue Griffin BGR369 (CD)
- (2016) Miniaturas de Oswald – Nahim Marun (piano) – no label (distrib. Tratore) RTM003 (CD)
