= String Quartet No. 4 (Oswald) =

The String Quartet No. 4 in C minor, Op. 46, by Henrique Oswald was finished between July and August 1921. The string quartet is the composer's last major chamber work. The approximate duration is 15 minutes.

== History ==
In 1921, Oswald was already 69 years old. According to José Eduardo Martins, this quartet is a synthesis of his entire chamber production, with its musical texture being extremely pure. On this composition Oswald's wife Laudômia wrote in her diary: "The daddy's Quartet is modern, splendid, especially the Adagio (November 29)." Same year he composed the Étude for the left hand alone.

The quartet had bad luck in Rio de Janeiro. On the contrary, a performance in São Paulo in February 1927 was highly successful. Composer Ernani Braga commented it: "One can't say which of the three movements of this quartet to admire more. The inspiration flows clearly and spontaneously, as if it were coming from wonderful and inexhaustible ancient seas. The contrapuntal texture, although thick, never loses the qualities of clarity, which are essential."

The fourth quartet was the last major chamber work by Oswald. In June 1927 he tried his hand with another string quartet (Op. 47), of which he sketched two versions, but none of them was finished. Like his other string quartets, the fourth remains unpublished.

== Music ==
The quartet consists of three movements:

1. Allegro moderato (C minor)
2. Adagio (F minor)
3. Allegro molto (C major)

The first movement opens with a highly emotional principal theme of the quartet stated by the violin alone. This theme provides material for most of the music of all the three movements. The second subject of the sonata form is in E♭ major. The development section is based mainly on it. After the recapitulation of the principal theme the secondary returns in C major. A brief coda concludes this movement.

The Adagio opens with accompaniment chords, and it is only when the violin enters with its theme that the tonality is clarified to F minor. This movement is written in a simple ternary form and has no expressively contrasting moments.

The C major finale changes the mood completely. it lasts only 4,5 minutes (just a little more than the Adagio). Yet it is in the sonata form, in agreement with the classical rules. The second subject is in G major, transposed in the recapitulation to C major. The cyclic character and thematic unity of the entire composition is emphasized by the introduction of the first movement principal theme in its original form to the development section. After its second appearance the slightly changed theme of the Adagio leads straight into the recapitulation.

== Recordings ==
- (2010/2011) Henrique Oswald: Música de câmara (Integral dos quartetos de cordas; Integral dos quartetos com piano; Quinteto com piano Op. 18; Trio com piano Op. 45; Sonata-Fantasia Op. 44; Elegia para cello e piano) – ArsBrasil (violin: Artur Roberto Huf, Samuel Lima; viola: André Rodrigues, Valdeci Merquiori; cello: Gêneses Oliveira, Mauro Brucoli, Renato Oliveira), Fernando Lopes (piano) – Ariah Cultural (3 CDs)

== Sources ==
- José Eduardo Martins (1995). Henrique Oswald: músico de uma saga romântica. EdUSP. ISBN 978-85-314-0302-6.
