= Ernani Braga =

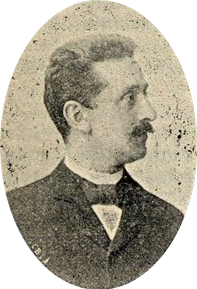
- Born: 10 January 1888; Rio de Janeiro, Empire of Brazil
- Died: 17 September 1948 (aged 60); São Paulo, Brazil
- Occupations: Composer; pianist

Ernani Braga (born Hernani da Costa Braga; January 10, 1888 – September 17, 1948) was a Brazilian composer, pianist and conductor, concerned to belong to the second generation of the nationalists in music. He composed works for voice, choir, orchestra and piano. He is little known outside the South America. Francisco Braga (1868–1945), with whom he is sometimes confused, was his teacher and friend. Among Ernani Braga's pupils was Camargo Guarnieri.

== Life ==
=== Early years and studies ===
Braga was born in Rio de Janeiro on January 10, 1888 to a Portuguese family, a fifth child of the nine. His father, João Joaquim da Costa Braga, was a prosperous merchant, who moved to Brazil in the middle of the 19th century. His mother was Antônia Maria Xavier Braga. Ernani's elder sister Zaíra had interest in music too, and it was she who became his first teacher. The father died in 1897, and the boy entered a boarding school of Colégio Salesiano de Santa Rosa in Niterói, where he remained up to 1904. On the second school year he began conducting masses and chants sung at the college chapel.

In 1904 Braga returned to his mother and siblings to work in the family business. He took piano lessons with Manuel Faulhaber, and in 1910, not without this professor's encouragement, entered the Instituto Nacional de Música to study piano, theory, harmony and counterpoint. His professors were Arthur Napoleão dos Santos, Alberto Nepomuceno, Alfredo Bevilacqua, Agnello França and Francisco Braga. In 1913 he was sent to Paris. There he made acquaintance with Vincent d'Indy, Piaggio and the pianist Lucien Wurmern. Braga deepened his compositional skills with d'Indy's handbook Cours de composition musicale. On one occasion he performed at the Salle Pleyel. He also met in Paris his future wife, Eponina D'Atri (daughter of Brazilian cultural attache Alessando D'Atri): he gave her piano lessons, and the same year they got married.

In 1914 Braga came back to Rio de Janeiro to continue his studies at the Instituto Nacional de Música. In 1916 a son was born to him and named Francisco, in honor of professor Francisco Braga. The same year Ernani graduated with distinction and a gold medal (the president of the jury was the Polish virtuoso Ignacy Jan Paderewski). In 1919 Braga entered a competition for a free professorship of piano, and in 1921 he took his teacher Bevilacqua's professor chair at the Instituto Nacional de Música. In 1920 another child was born, a daughter Vera, and he invited Antônio Francisco Braga to be godfather to her. After he became a professor, Ernani continued giving recitals and developed relations with different persons of culture. Together with his wife he met the Villa-Lobos couple.

=== Modernism and nationalism ===
In the years 1921/22–1927 Braga resided in São Paulo, where he was professor of piano at the Conservatório Dramático e Musical. In order to move to São Paulo, he was obliged to leave his position at Instituto Nacional de Música, Rio de Janeiro, in July 1922. He also taught in Campinas, Araraquara and Jaboticabal. Among his pupils can be listed Adolpho Tabacow and Camargo Guarnieri.

He took part in the famous Semana de Arte Moderna in São Paulo (1922) as interpreter of compositions by Heitor Villa-Lobos and Erik Satie's parody on Frédéric Chopin's funeral march (No.2 of Embryons desséchés).

After São Paulo Braga moved to Recife, where he became one of the founders of the Pernambuco Conservatory (1930). He left the city in 1939 and spent 2 years in concert tours through the country. In the years 1942–1943 he resided in Buenos Aires moderating the Hora do Brasil program. In 1944 he returned to Brazil. In 1946 Braga came back to São Paulo, where he died on September 17, 1948.

== Compositions ==
Ernani Braga's earliest compositions date from the beginning of the 1920s. According to his daughter Vera, they were highly influenced by German lied tradition and by the works of Robert Schumann particularly. The composer's acquaintance with Villa-Lobos and other modernists along with folklore researches made him a follower of Mário de Andrade's nationalistic ideas. His compositions usually include elements of Brazilian folk music, and his most important works are thought to be harmonizations of folk songs.

The most famous work by Braga is Cinco canções nordestinas do folclore brasileiro (Five Songs of Northeastern Brazilian Folklore). This collection is based on material from a region with sizeable population of African people. Their influence produces intricate rhythmic patterns and leads to the use of African dialects. The speech rhythm becomes an important compositional device in these pieces.

Another important work by Braga is a song collection titled Cancioneiro Gaúcho, composed for the bicentenary of Porto Alegre (1940). It was intended to meet the demands of the political strategy of the Vargas Era. It consists of eleven songs, of which the last (Velha gaita) was harmonized only for one voice and piano, while each of the other ten songs have two versions: for 2 female voices and piano (however in most of the songs the second voice is ad libitum) or for female chorus a cappella (usually 3- or 4-part, though the Chimarrita is 5-part). The lack of choral arrangement for the last song was explained by Braga merely through the lack of time, but there is an old LP recording of such arrangement, what makes one suggest that the composer worked it out at some moment later.
