= Cacilda Borges Barbosa =

Brazilian pianist, conductor and composer

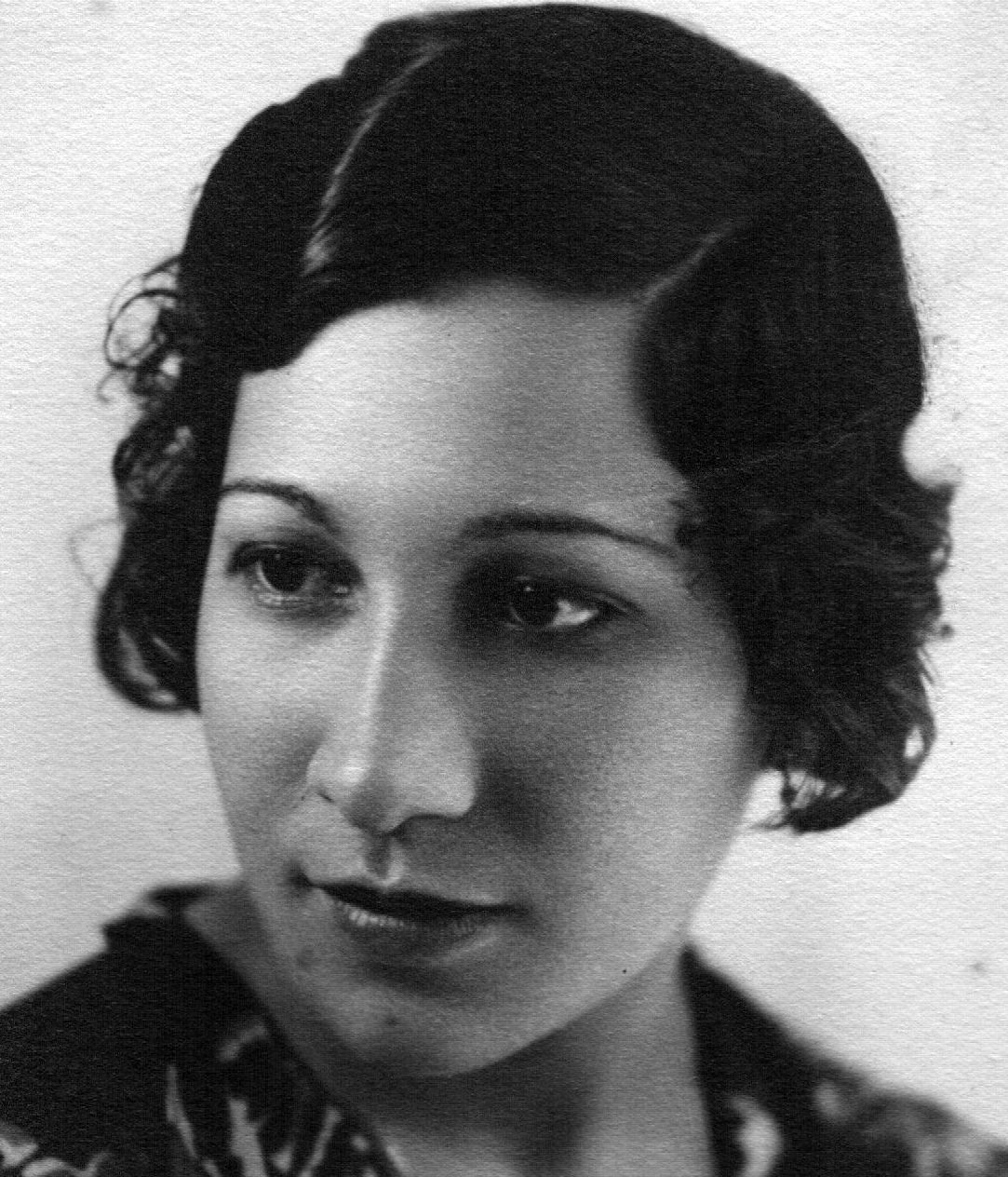

Cacilda Campos Borges Barbosa (18 May 1914 – 6 August 2010) was a Brazilian pianist, conductor and composer. She was one of the pioneers of electronic music in Brazil.

== Life ==
Barbosa was born in Rio de Janeiro, Brazil. In 1928, she joined the National Institute of Music in Rio de Janeiro, where she studied with Francisco Braga, Paulino Chaves, harmony with Oscar Lorenzo Fernandez and theory with Lima Coutinho. After completing her education, Barbosa worked as a pianist playing waltzes and chorinhos to dance groups and compose pieces for them. In the 1950s she published the first volume of the series "Estudos Brasileiros para Canto" and became conductor of the Radio Mayrink Veiga orchestra.

Barbosa worked with Heitor Villa-Lobos from 1930, and served as director of the Instituto Villa-Lobos. She became a professor for chamber ensemble of the National School of Music at the University of Brazil and professor of counterpoint and fugue at the Popular School of Music Education. She also directed a number of orchestras and choir ensembles.

== Works ==
Barbosa composed a number of works, many with a strong Brazilian theme. She also composed a number of pieces of orchestral music and chamber music together with pieces for teaching piano students. Selected works include:

- Procissão da Chuva - Poem: Wilson Rodrigues
- Estudos Brasileiros
- Trio for Reeds
- Rio de Janeiro Suite for strings (1st mov)
- Rio de Janeiro Suite for strings (2nd mov)
- Little Entrance Music
