= String Quartet No. 3 (Oswald) =

The String Quartet No. 3, Op. 39, by Henrique Oswald was composed in 1908. It is dedicated to Francisco Braga.

== Structure ==
The quartet is in three movements:

1. Allegro agitato
2. Andante con moto
3. Allegro moderato

== Recordings ==
- (2010/2011) Henrique Oswald: Música de câmara (Integral dos quartetos de cordas; Integral dos quartetos com piano; Quinteto com piano Op. 18; Trio com piano Op. 45; Sonata-Fantasia Op. 44; Elegia para cello e piano) – ArsBrasil (violin: Artur Roberto Huf, Samuel Lima; viola: André Rodrigues, Valdeci Merquiori; cello: Gêneses Oliveira, Mauro Brucoli, Renato Oliveira), Fernando Lopes (piano) – Ariah Cultural (3 CDs)

== Sources ==
- José Eduardo Martins (1995). Henrique Oswald: músico de uma saga romântica. EdUSP. ISBN 978-85-314-0302-6.
