= Cello Sonata No. 2 (Oswald) =

The Sonata-Fantasia in E♭ major, Op. 44, by Henrique Oswald was composed in 1916. It is his second cello sonata. The approximate duration is 13–13½ minutes.

== History ==
The sonata was performed together with Oswald's Piano Trio in B minor, Op. 45 at Salão do Jornal do Comércio (Rio de Janeiro) on 13 August 1916 by Alfredo Gomes (cello) and Joaquim Antonio Barrozo Netto, on a concert given by the Trio Barrozo–Milano–Gomes.

An article published in Jornal do Comércio said that Oswald decided to write a cello sonata after he heard Pablo Casals's playing and that this was only the first movement of a yet non-complete multi-movement sonata. If it is so, then it must be claimed that the composer concluded later it was a satisfactory self-standing composition.

The piece remained unpublished until 1982, when José Eduardo Martins made the first edition of it.

== Structure and analysis ==
The sonata is in one movement divided into three sections: Andante – Allegro agitato – Andante.

The overall structure of the piece is a sonata form with a second subject appearing at first in B♭ major and returning in the recapitulation in the tonic key of E♭ major. The development section itself is another sonata form with its own tonal relations. The first subject is in A minor, while the second proceeds from A♭ major to C major in the exposition and from F major to A major in the recapitulation. The development section of this inner sonata form is highly chromatic.

The music of the entire sonata is based on five main motives. The first two form the first subject (one in the piano, the other in the cello part), the third is used for the second subject. While the theme of the development first subject provides an essentially new motif (the fourth), the theme of the second subject is compiled of all the previous motives. But it can be called a new (the fifth) motif, due to its structural functions. The inner development section uses also the material of the outer sonata form.

== Editions ==
- Henrique Oswald. Sonata-fantasia op. 44 [para] piano e violoncelo. São Paulo: Editora Novas Metas, ©1982. 24 + 6 p. (edited by José Eduardo Martins).

== Recordings ==
- (1983) Henrique Oswald: Integral para violoncelo e piano; obras para piano solo – Antônio del Claro (cello), José Eduardo Martins (piano) – Funarte 3.56.502.001 (2 LPs)
- (2001) Henrique Oswald: Música de câmara para violoncelo e piano: Berceuse; Elegia; Sonata op. 21; Sonata-Fantasia op. 44 – duoCERVALI: Milene Aliverti (cello) and Lucia Cervini (piano) – Apoio FAPESP (CD, uncommercial)
- (2003) Henrique Oswald: Quarteto para piano e cordas op. 26, Sonata-Fantasia para violoncelo e piano op. 44, Concerto para piano e orquestra op. 10 (em versão para piano e quinteto de cordas realizada pelo autor) – Quarteto Rubio, Pascal Smets (double bass), José Eduardo Martins (piano) – Música de Concerto MC004 (CD)
- (2010/2011) Henrique Oswald: Música de câmara (Integral dos quartetos de cordas; Integral dos quartetos com piano; Quinteto com piano Op. 18; Trio com piano Op. 45; Sonata-Fantasia Op. 44; Elegia para cello e piano) – ArsBrasil (violin: Artur Roberto Huf, Samuel Lima; viola: André Rodrigues, Valdeci Merquiori; cello: Gêneses Oliveira, Mauro Brucoli, Renato Oliveira), Fernando Lopes (piano) – Ariah Cultural (3 CDs)

== Sources ==
- Lucia Cervini. Interpretação em Henrique Oswald: transformações entre o allegro agitato da sonata op. 21 e a sonata-fantasia op. 44 para violoncelo e piano. 2001. 215 p. Dissertação (mestrado) - Universidade Estadual de Campinas, Instituto de Artes, Campinas, SP.
