= String Quartet in E minor =

String Quartet in E minor may refer to:

- String Quartet No. 8 (Beethoven)
- String Quartet No. 4 (Dvořák)
- String Quartet (Elgar)
- String Quartet (Fauré)
- String Quartet No. 4 (Mendelssohn)
- String Quartet No. 2 (Oswald)
- String Quartet No. 1 (Smetana)
- String Quartet (Verdi)
