= Adolpho =

Adolpho is a masculine given name. Notable people with this name include:

- Adolpho A. Birch (1932–2011), American lawyer and judge
- Adolpho Araujo Netto (born 1984), Brazilian footballer
- Adolpho Ducke (1876–1959), German and Brazilian entomologist
- Adolpho Lindenberg (1924–2024), Brazilian architect and activist
- Adolpho Milman (1915–1980), Brazilian footballer
- Adolpho Tabacow, Brazilian pianist
- Adolpho Washington (born 1967), American boxer
- Adolpho Wellisch (1886–1972), Brazilian diver
- Genoa Leilani Adolpho Keawe-Aiko (1918–2008), American musician
- Adolphos Heindricks (1883–1967), Australian rules footballer

== See also ==
- Adolfo (given name)
- Adolf
