= Hilda Pires dos Reis =

Hilda Pires dos Reis (10 October 1919 - 2001 ) was a Brazilian composer, conductor, educator and pianist.

Pires dos Reis was born in Rio de Janeiro, Brazil, to Narciza Aires dos Reis Pires and Antonio Joaquim Pires. At the age of 10 she began studying at the National Institute of Music in Rio de Janeiro. Her teachers included Vera Vasconcelos Cavalcanti de Albuquerque, Francisco Braga, Guilherme Fontainha, Arnaud Gouveia, Francisco Mignone, and Paulo Silva.She earned a doctorate in conducting and piano from the School of Music of the Federal University of Rio de Janeiro (EMUFRJ) and later became a professor and head of the composition department there. She also taught piano at the Brazilian Conservatory of Music in Rio de Janeiro. Her students included the Brazilian composer and violinist Guilherme Carneiro da Cunha Bauer.

== Works ==
Pires dos Reis’s works include:

=== Chamber works ===
- Brazilian Serenade for double bass and piano
- Sonata No. 2 for cello and piano
- String Quartet No. 1
- Valsa Seresta for bassoon and piano

=== Orchestral works ===
- Bailado dos Gigantes da Botas
- Introducao e Modinha
- Maracatu
- O Navio Aventureiro
- Revery
- Spanish Fantasy

=== Piano works ===
- pieces

=== Vocal works ===
- “Cantares”
- “Eu Te Quis Tanto”
- “Jongo”
- “Legenda”
- “Tristezas de Amor”
- “Via-láctea”
