= Alberto Pestalozza =

Italian composer

Alberto Pestalozza (c. 1851–8 June 1934) composed (with Carlo Tiochet) and published a popular Piedmontese song, "Ciribiribin", in 1898.

Born and died in Turin.

== See also ==
- 1898 in music
