= Il Neo =

- Opera by Henrique Oswald
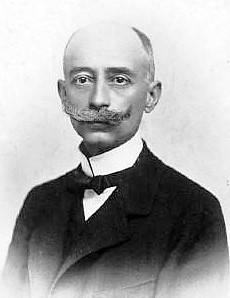
- Oswald in 1907
- Librettist: Eduardo Filippi
- Language: Italian
- Based on: La mouche by Alfred de Musset

Il Neo (La Mouche) is an opera in 1 act, 3 tableaux (novelletta musicale in 3 piccoli quadri — musical novelette in 3 little tableaux) by Henrique Oswald to an Italian libretto by Eduardo Filippi after a novella La mouche by Alfred de Musset. Composed in 1900. Never published, It is the only of three operas by Oswald which definitely was staged.

== History ==
Il Neo is Oswald's second opera written some thirty years after his first (1872). The composer may have turned to this genre again because of the rapid development of opera in Brazil around 1900: the public of Rio de Janeiro heartily accepted foreign opera companies and operas. Compositions by Mascagni, Leoncavallo, Giordano, Puccini, Massenet and Wagner were staged. National composers began to add their own works to the repertoire. For example, in 1900 Jupyra by Francisco Braga, the score of which is dedicated to Oswald, was staged.

Because of its comic subject, Oswald's opera was described by press as an operetta. The music explores different features of 18th century singing.

A 1900 performance is mentioned, but doesn't have any documentary testimonies. The opera was performed (and aired on radio) in 1925. A 1929 performance may be mentioned by mistake for 1925. In 1950 it was performed at the Teatro Municipal in Rio de Janeiro, with tenor Alfredo Colosimo, who became the first tenor of the theater that year. It was staged there again in 1952 to celebrate the composer's centenary. It was definitely performed in 1954, again by Alfredo Colosimo, this time in Minas Gerais, with Mario de Bruno conducting.

The manuscript at the São Paulo library of Escola de Comunicações a Artes is one that was used by Mario de Bruno. It has 166 pages (with pages 109-120, part of the third tableau, discarded by the composer).

A Berceuse from this opera arranged by the composer for voice and piano was published by Bevilacqua in supplement to Renascença No. 1, 1904.

== Scoring ==
There are 9 roles: 5 principal (soprano, mezzo-soprano, 2 tenors and bariton) and 3 secondary (2 sopranos, mezzo-soprano, tenor and bass), and a mixed chorus (SATB).

The orchestra consists of piccoli, flutes, oboes, clarinets (in B♭), bassoons; trumpets (in F), trombone (in E♭), bass trombone; percussion; harp and strings.
