= Cello Sonata No. 1 (Oswald) =

The Cello Sonata No. 1 in D minor, Op. 21, by Henrique Oswald was composed in 1898 in Florence. It is dedicated to composer Luigi Stefano Giarda. Approximate duration is 21 minutes.

There are two autograph versions of the sonata. The first one is dated 1898 (same year as the composition of the Piano Quartet No. 2, Op. 26), the second is 1901. The first version was published in 1982 by Editora Novas Metas. There is also a manuscript arrangement for double bass dated 1901. It was included by Fausto Borém De Oliveira in his 1993 thesis. Same thesis proposed some errata for the 1982 edition.

== Music ==
The sonata is in traditional three movements:

1. Allegro agitato (D minor)
2. Romanza. Adagio molto espressivo (B♭ major)
3. Molto allegro (D minor)

The first movement is a sonata form, the first subject of which presents all the four main motives of the movement: two of them form the theme, while the other two are used for a contrapuntal accompaniment. At first the theme is given to cello, then it is played for another time by the piano. The second subject is in F major, and its theme is stated by the piano alone, passing later to the cello. It is based on the two motives of the first subject accompaniment. The exposition is repeated. The development section can be easily divided into smaller parts. After a brief introduction (bars 83–90) with only fragments of it appearing, the principal theme is carried through different keys and registers (91–114). It stops in A major. In the second part of the development (115–134) this motif is transformed into piano accompaniment for the cello working out the descending motif (found originally in the first subject accompaniment). The music chromatically modulates to A♭ major. The third part (134–153) by a B♭ pedal prepares the A leading to the tonic (D minor). The recapitulation states the principal theme again, and then comes the second subject in D major. The key is changed back to minor in the coda based on the descending motif.

The second movement is a romance in B♭ major in ternary form. The broad cantilena theme is sung twice by the cello with the piano providing an accompaniment. After a middle section with turbulent arpeggios in the piano part, this theme returns, as the instruments change the roles. For the coda the cello takes the leading position again.

The finale is the shortest movement of the entire composition lasting little more than 4 minutes. It is again a D minor sonata form. The resolute first subject soon gives place to the F major second theme. The development mixes them. In the recapitulation the second subject appears in D major. This time the major mode is kept up to the end of the sonata.

== Editions ==
- Henrique Oswald. Sonata Op. 21 (violoncelo e piano). São Paulo: Editora Novas Metas, ©1982. 27 + 8 p. (edited by José Eduardo Martins).

== Recordings ==
Original version

- (1983) Henrique Oswald: Integral para violoncelo e piano; obras para piano solo – Antônio del Claro (cello), José Eduardo Martins (piano) – Funarte 3.56.502.001 (2 LPs)
- (2001) Henrique Oswald: Música de câmara para violoncelo e piano: Berceuse; Elegia; Sonata Op. 21; Sonata-Fantasia Op. 44 – duoCERVALI: Milene Aliverti (cello) and Lucia Cervini (piano) – Apoio FAPESP (CD, uncommercial)

Double bass version

- (2015) Metamorfora: Works for double bass and piano (Boccherini, Sallinen, Beethoven, Oswald [Cello Sonata, Op. 21, transposed to E minor], Proto) – Marcos Machado (double bass), Ney Fialkow (piano) – Blue Griffin BGR369 (CD)
