= Annibal Napoleão =

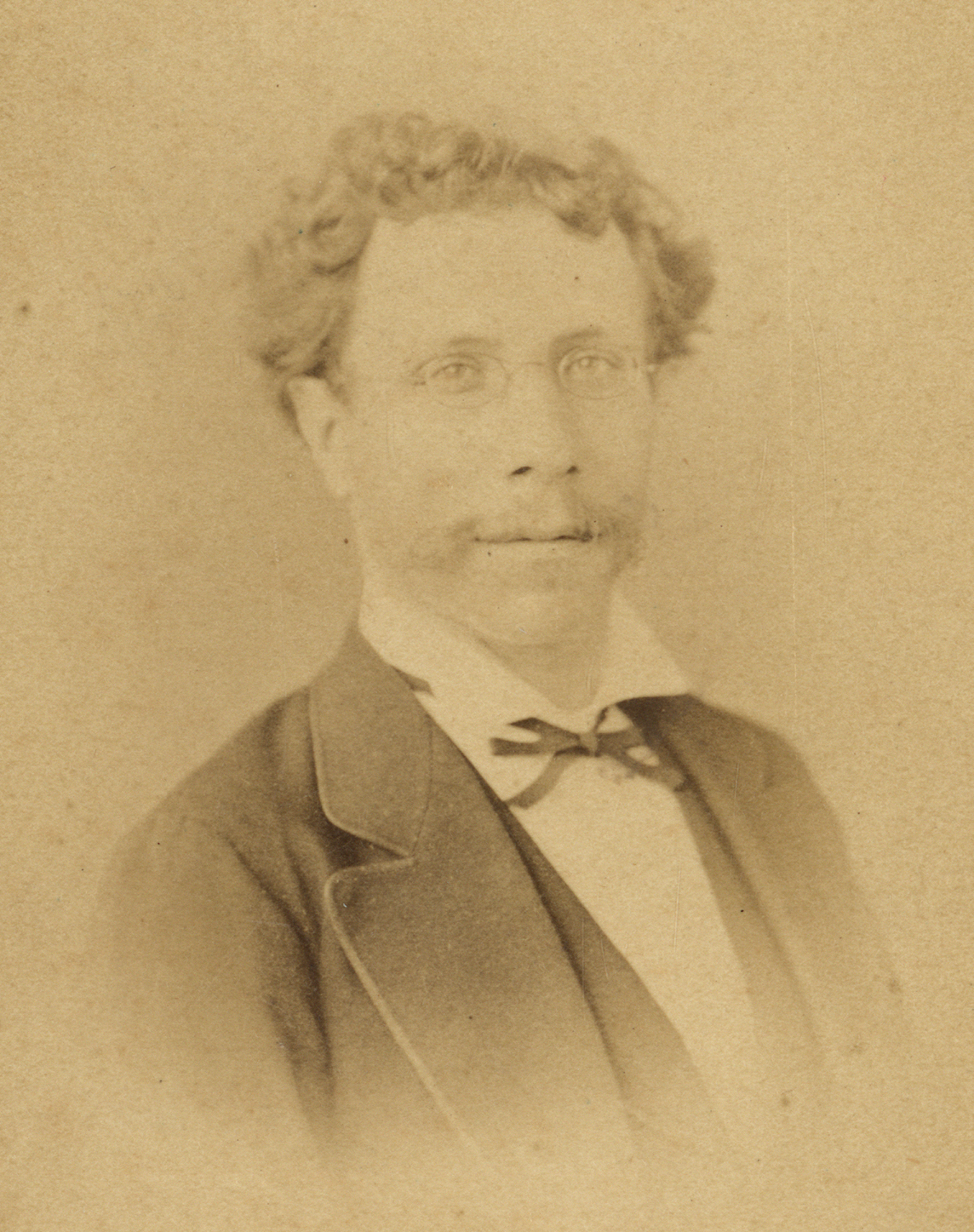
- Napoleão, 1874
- Born: Porto, Portugal
- Died: 1880; Lisbon, Portugal
- Occupations: Pianist; composer

Annibal Napoleão dos Santos (3 January 1845 or 1846 — 1880) was a Portuguese pianist and composer. He was the second of three Napoleão pianist and composer siblings, the elder being Arthur Napoleão (1843–1925), the younger Alfredo Napoleão (1852–1917). Annibal is the least important among them, partly because of his weak health and partly of his premature death.

== Biography ==
He was born in Porto, Portugal to Alexandre Napoleão (a musician himself) and Joaquina Maria dos Santos. First studied music with his father, then with Sproule in Ireland. He became a professor in Lisbon. In 1869 moved to Brazil, toured the country and gave musical lessons in Rio de Janeiro. But the Brazilian climate did not fit him well, and he came back to Portugal, where he died in Lisbon in 1880.

== Compositions ==
Annibal's compositions were published by his brother Arthur in Rio de Janeiro.

For piano

- Op.1 - Le Gladiateur, Grande galop de bravoure
- Op.2 - Les Perles d'Andalousie, Six danses caractéristiques
- Op.3 - La Pluie de roses (A chuva de rozas), Grande polka de concert No. 1
- Op.4 - Rêve du jeune âge, Nocturne No. 1
- Op.5 - Impromptu-Valse
- Op.6 - Ernani, Transcription de concert
- Op.7 - Il Arco di Sant'Anna, Opera de Sá Noronha, Fantaisie-caprice (Fantaisie de salon)
- Op.10 - Dans les forêts du Brésil, Souvenir de voyage, Impromptu
- Op.11 - Souvenir, Nocturne No. 2
- Op.12 - Inquiétude, Idylle
- Op.13 - Vision d'amour, Nocturne No. 3
- Op.14 - Tourbillon de fleurs, Grande polka de concert No. 2
- Op.15 - Je t'aime, Romance sans paroles
- Op.16 - Minuit, Impromptu No. 2
- Op.17 - La Douleur, Romance sans paroles
- Op.18 - Giroflé-Girofla, Fantaisie
- Op.19 - Les soupirs, Mazurka élégante
- Op.20 - Patrie!, Suite de Valses
- Op.21 - Rêverie

For voice and piano

- Saudades, Romance, text by Fernando Castico
