= Luciano Gallet =

Brazilian composer, conductor and pianist

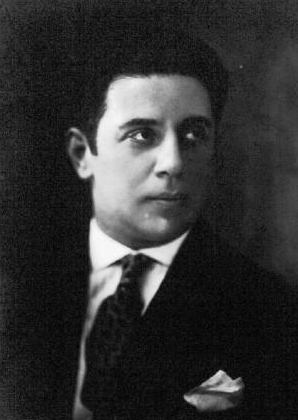

Background information
- Born: June 28, 1893; Rio de Janeiro, Brazil
- Died: October 29, 1931 (aged 38) Rio de Janeiro, Brazil
- Occupations: Composer, Conductor, Pianist
- Years active: 1916–1931

Luciano Gallet (June 28, 1893 in Rio de Janeiro – October 29, 1931 in Rio de Janeiro) was a Brazilian composer, conductor and pianist.

Gallet was born in Rio de Janeiro to a French-Brazilian father and a French mother and displayed musical talent at a young age, winning the Gold Medal from the Instituto Nacional de Música in 1916. He began piano playing as a school boy, and first studied and graduated in architecture, before enrolling at the Instituto Nacional de Música to study music with Henrique Oswald, Abdon Milanez and Agnelo França. In 1917, he studied harmony with Darius Milhaud. In 1922, he started to conduct the choir and the orchestra of the Instituto Nacional de Música and in 1926 he became publisher of the music magazine Weco. In 1930 he was one of the founders of the Associação Brasileira de Música and became Director of the Instituto Nacional de Música.

Gallet spearheaded a campaign called Reagir! (to fight back) in 1930 to "rescue" Brazilian music and culture from what he saw as popular indifference. His initial article, published in the newspaper O Globo, was republished and circulated widely. He, along with Mário de Andrade, pioneered the study of Brazilian folk music.

Gallet was married to Luisa Gallet until his death in 1931. She later married Arthur Ramos, a physician and anthropologist.

== Works ==
Orchestra Music

- Tango-batuque (1919)
- Moderato e allegro (1920)
- Suite bucólica (1920)
- Elegia (1921)
- Dança brasileira (1925)
- Toca-zumba (1926)
- Suspira, coração triste (1927)
- Xangô (1929)
- Pai do mato (1929)
- Suite popular (1929)

Chamber Music

- Turuna (1926)
- Suite sobre temas negro brasileiros (1929)

Sonatas

- Berceuse (1917)
- Caxinguelê (1917)
- Doze exercícios brasileiro (1928)
- Elegia (1918)
- Romance n. 1 (1918)
- Romance n. 2 (1918).

Songs

- Le sonnet d’Arvers (1918)
- Alanguissement (1918)
- Canção dolente (1918)
- A Partida (1919)
- Suspira, coração triste (1921)
- A Vida (1922)
- Olhos verdes (1922)
- Fotorototó (1924)
- Ai, que coração (1924)
- Foi numa noite calmosa (1925)
- Maxixe (1925); Tutu-marambá (1927)
- Marcha, soldado (1927)
- Atirei um pau no gato (1928)
- Carneirinho, carneirão (1928)
- Xangô (1928)
- Deux chansons de Bilitis (1920)
- Toada (1922)
- Sertaneja (1924)
- O Luar do sertão (1924)
- Toca-sumba (1926)

Church Music

- Ave Maria n. 1 (1918)
- Padre Nosso n. 2 (1918)
- Três cantos religiosos (1919)
- O Salutaris (1920)
- Si quaeris miracula (1926)
