= Adolpho Tabacow =

Brazilian pianist

Adolpho Tabacow (died after 1942) was a Brazilian pianist of Jewish origin. His father was Rachmiel (Ramiro) Tabacow, invited to São Paulo by his uncle Isaac Tabacow in the first years of the 20th century. Among Adolpho's teachers were Agostino Cantù and Ernani Braga (who resided in São Paulo in 1921/22–1927). In 1942 he participated in a piano competition organized by Columbia Concerts and was viewed as a probable winner, but the first prize went to Arnaldo Estrela.

In addition to performing, Tabacow composed some music, one of his compositions being Lenda Casaca.

A street in a São Paulo neighbourhood Itaim Bibi (neighbourhood) is named after him (Rua Adolfo Tabacow).
