= Ciribiribin =

Song
- Language: Piedmontese
- Written: 1898
- Composer: Alberto Pestalozza
- Lyricist: Carlo Tiochet

"Ciribiribin" [tʃiribiriˈbin] is a Piedmontese ballad, originally in three-quarter time, composed by Alberto Pestalozza in 1898 with lyrics by Carlo Tiochet. It quickly became popular and has been recorded by many artists. Decades later it enjoyed continued popularity with swing and jazz bands, played in four-four time.

== Background ==
The distinguishing feature of the song is repeated use of the five-note title phrase. In the sheet music the name is indicated to be enunciated chiri-biri-bean to allow singers to hold the vowel at the end as long as they like.

== Early successes ==
- It was a success as "Ciribiribin Waltz" for Prince's Orchestra in 1911 reaching a number three position in the charts of the day as calculated by Joel Whitburn.
- Grace Moore enjoyed chart success with the song in 1934 reaching a peak position of number 15. She also made a live recording accompanied by a pianist, Gibner King, as an encore after presenting some pieces with Willem Mengelberg and the Concertgebouw Orchestra on June 23, 1936.
- The song was a favorite of Harry James, who chose it as his theme song when he formed his band in 1939 and wrote English lyrics for it with Jack Lawrence. The James version reached the No. 10 spot in the charts in 1940. Frank Sinatra worked with James's band for a while before going to work for Tommy Dorsey. On the James/Sinatra recording of the song, Sinatra enunciated the trailing "n".
- Bing Crosby and the Andrews Sisters recorded the song on September 20, 1939 with Joe Venuti and his Orchestra and it reached the number 13 spot in the charts in 1940. This was Crosby's first recording with the Andrews Sisters and they went on to have another 22 chart hits together in the US.

== Other recordings ==
Artists who have recorded the song in Italian include Gracie Fields, Mario Lanza, Claudio Villa, and Renato Carosone. Coloratura sopranos Mado Robin and Erna Sack recorded the song as well (in German for Erna Sack).

== In popular culture ==
- The song "Java Jive", a hit song for the Ink Spots in 1940, originally featured the couplet "I'm not keen about a bean / Unless it is a 'cheery beery bean", as a pun on "Ciribiribin", but the Ink Spots' lead singer inadvertently sang it as "cheery cheery bean", and recordings by subsequent artists have generally either followed suit or changed it to "chili chili bean".
- An earlier play on the "chili" joke came in a comic song written by Albert Von Tilzer and recorded by Billy Murray in 1921. The song, "Chili Bean", is about an exotic woman named Chili Bean. A bar of "Ciribiribin" appears in a brief instrumental segment in the middle of the song.
- A rock 'n' roll adaptation, "Gotta Lotta Love", sung by Steve Alaimo, was mildly successful in late 1963, where it peaked at number 74.
