= James T. Powers =

American actor and singer

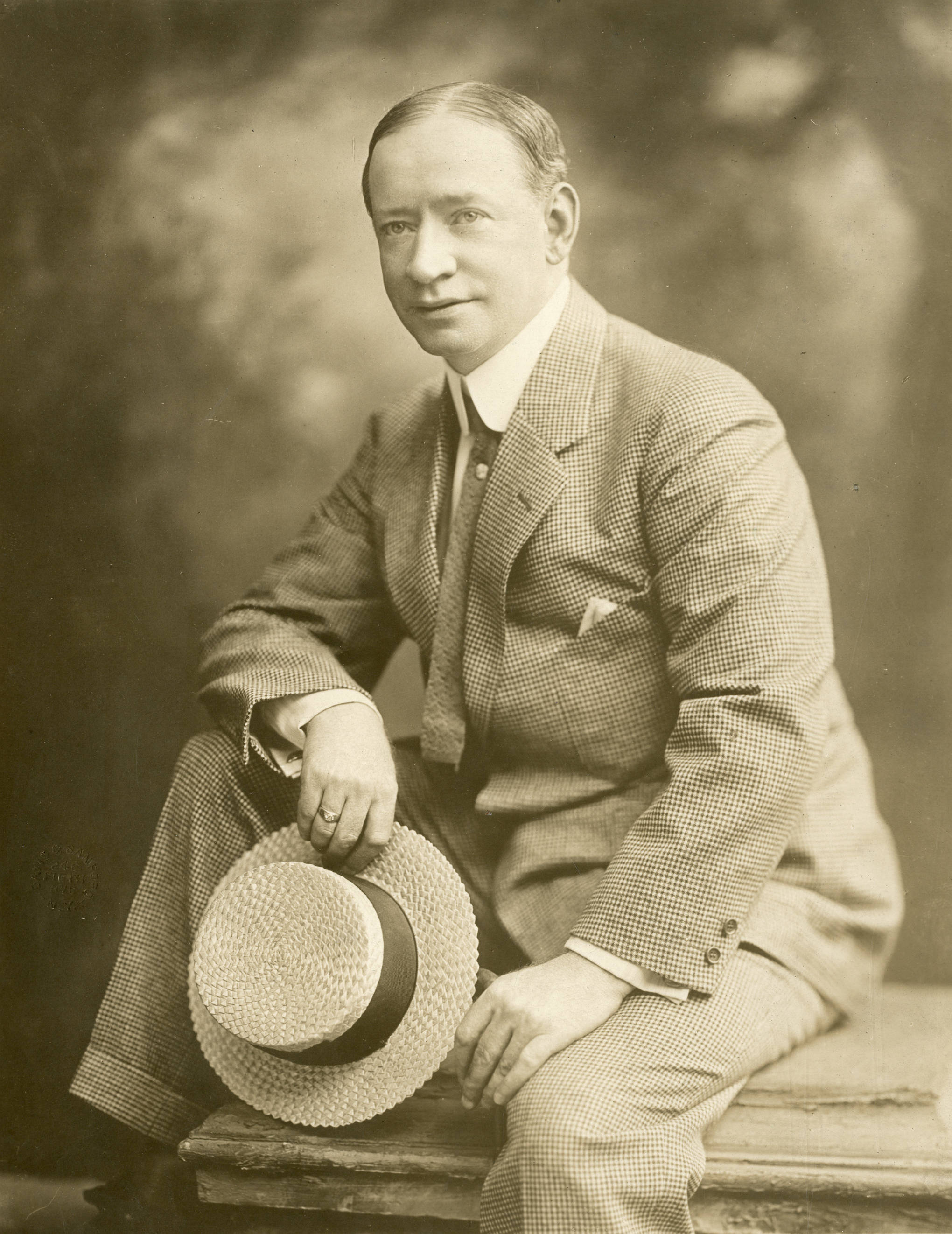
- Powers c.1911
- Born: James T. McGovern; April 26, 1862; New York City
- Died: February 10, 1943 (aged 80)
- Occupations: Actor, singer
- Years active: 1880–1935
- Spouse: Rachel Booth

James T. Powers (born James T. McGovern; April 26, 1862 – February 10, 1943) was an American stage actor, vocalist, and lyricist.

== Biography ==
Powers began on the stage in Boston in 1880 and also spent time in circuses and later, in vaudevilles. In the 1890s, he acted in many American versions of the so-called Gaiety musicals, originating in the London's West End, then coming into vogue in the United States.

His entire career was spent in live theatre. He, however, has one IMDb credit for a short film from 1905 Digesting a Joke (James T. Powers).

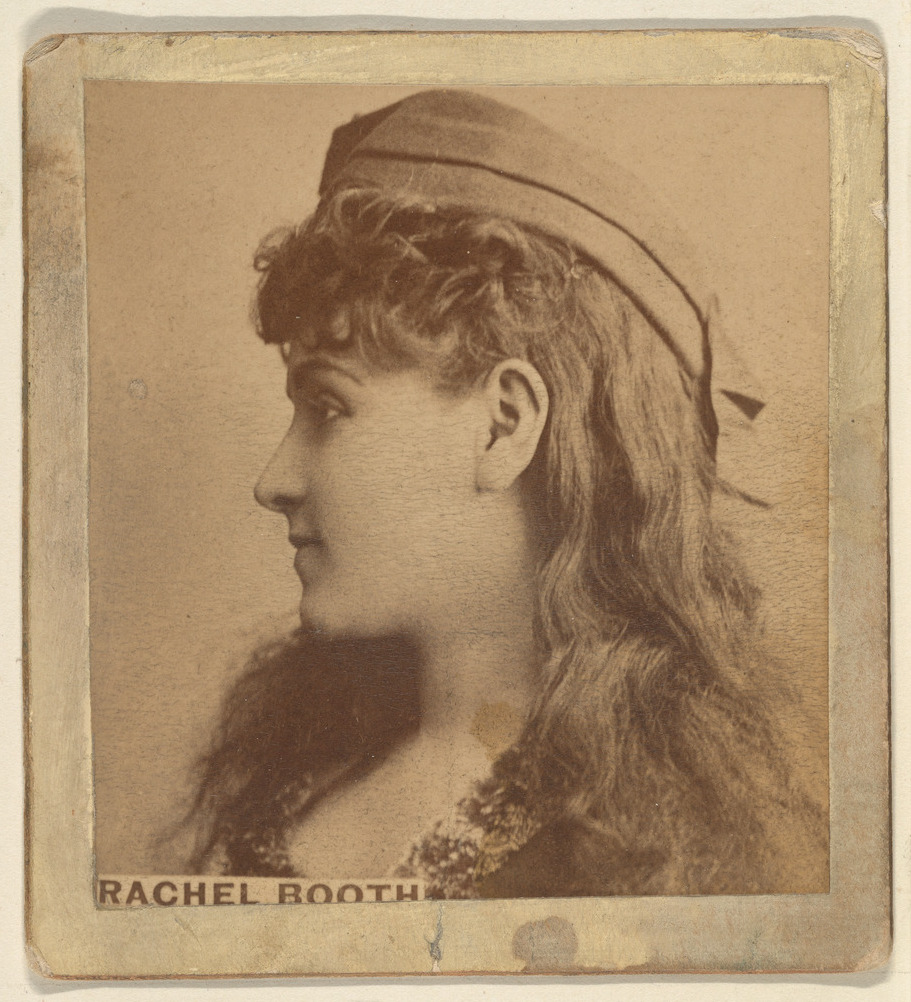
Rachel Booth, circa 1890

On May 19, 1892, he married in Rochester, New York the actress Rachel Booth (1862-1955). They toured together in several productions. The Powers made their home in the Ansonia residential hotel in New York City.

His autobiography, Twinkle Little Star was published in New York in 1939.

James T. Powers died in New York City on February 11, 1943.
