= Oscar Lorenzo Fernández =

Brazilian composer (1897–1948)

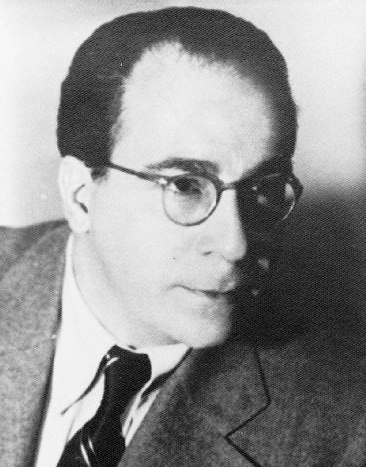

Background information
- Born: 4 November 1897; Rio de Janeiro, Brazil
- Died: August 27, 1948 (aged 50) Rio de Janeiro, Brazil
- Occupations: Composer, Professor

Oscar Lorenzo Fernández (4 November 1897 – 27 August 1948) was a Brazilian composer of Spanish descent. He was born and died in Rio de Janeiro.

== Life ==
Fernández studied at the Instituto Nacional de Música with Francisco Braga, Frederico Nascimento, and Henrique Oswald. In 1923, Nascimento was taken seriously ill, and Fernández was designated his temporary substitute in the chair of upper-level harmony, an appointment which became permanent two years later. In 1936 he founded the Conservatório Brasileiro de Música in Rio de Janeiro, which he directed until his death. From 1939 onward, he also served as Professor of Choral Singing at the Conservatório Nacional de Canto Orfeônico.

In 1930 Fernández composed the three-movement suite Reisado do Pastoreio, the last movement of which, "Batuque" (an Afro-Brazilian folk dance), became very popular. He composed a three-act opera, Malazarte (1931–33), to a libretto by José Pereira Graça Aranha, who adapted it from his own play of the same title. For the premiere at the Teatro Municipal (Rio de Janeiro, 1941), the libretto was translated into Italian. Malazarte is a nationalist work in both its subject matter and its musical content, and is considered the first successful Brazilian opera of this type. He also composed one ballet, two symphonies, five symphonic poems, two orchestral suites, one concerto each for piano and for violin, chamber music, about 80 compositions for piano, choral music, and 36 songs.
