= Alberto Nepomuceno =

Brazilian composer and conductor (1864–1920)

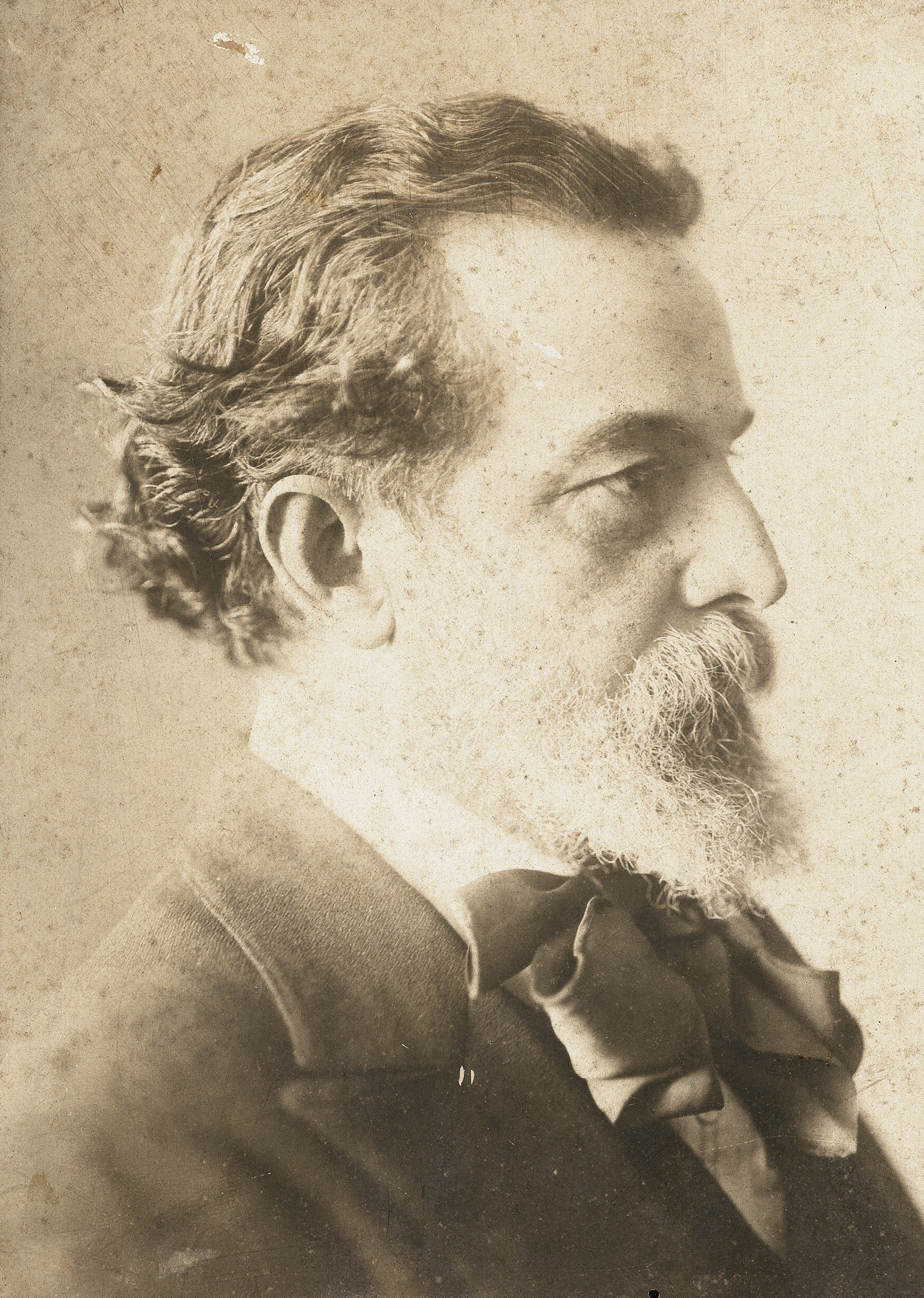
- Born: July 6, 1864; Fortaleza, Ceará, Empire of Brazil
- Died: October 16, 1920 (aged 56); Rio de Janeiro, Federal District, Brazil
- Occupations: composer and conductor
- Known for: music that reflects Brazilian culture
- Notable work: String Quartet No. 3 "Brasileiro"
- Spouse: Walborg Bang (m. 1893)
- Parents: Vitor Augusto Nepomuceno (father); Maria Virginia de Oliveira Paiva (mother)

Alberto Nepomuceno (July 6, 1864 – October 16, 1920) was a Brazilian composer and conductor.

== Career and music ==
Nepomuceno was born in Fortaleza, the capital of the state of Ceará in Northeastern Brazil. His parents were Vitor Augusto Nepomuceno and Maria Virginia de Oliveira Paiva. He began to study music with his father, a violinist, organist, teacher and chapel-master at the Fortaleza Cathedral. In 1872, Nepomuceno and his family moved to Recife, also in Northeastern Brazil, where he initiated piano and violin studies. He went on to become an outspoken defender of Republican and Abolitionist causes in Brazil, and was active in campaigns that ultimately led to the overthrow of the Monarchy and the establishment of the First Brazilian Republic in 1889. At the age of eighteen, he became director of the Clube Carlos Gomes (Carlos Gomes Club) in Recife.

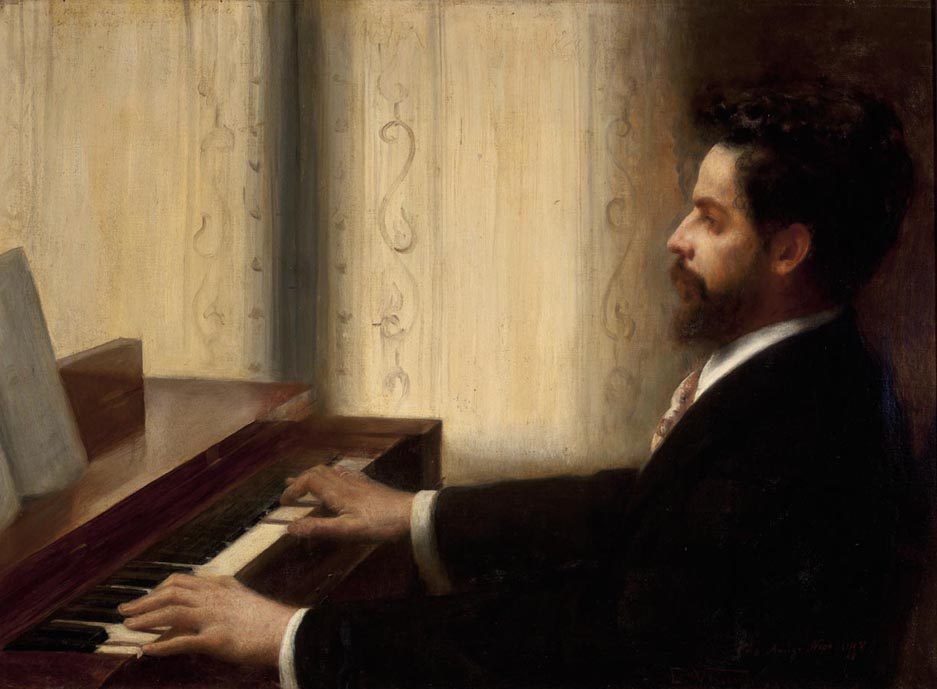
Portrait of Nepomuceno (1895) by Eliseu Visconti

In 1885, a series of songs in Portuguese by Nepomuceno was premiered at the Brazilian Musical National Institute. The concert was intended at defying those who thought Portuguese was inappropriate for the bel canto. As criticism poured, he embarked on a battle against newspapers and music critics. His struggle on behalf of nationalism in classical music led him to work at the Popular Concert Association from 1896 to 1906, where he pushed for the recognition of several Brazilian composers.

In 1888, Nepomuceno left for Europe in order to further his musical studies. In Rome, he took lessons from Giovanni Sgambati. He moved to Berlin in 1890, where he studied composition with Heinrich von Herzogenberg and continued his piano studies with Theodor Leschetizky at the Stern Conservatory. In Leschetizky's class, he met Norwegian student Walborg Bang, whom he ended up marrying in 1893. Bang had been a student and friend of Edvard Grieg's. After the wedding, Nepomuceno moved to Bergen and lived in Grieg's house. As Grieg was also an advocate for nationalism in composition, the friendship was instrumental in convincing Nepomuceno to write music that reflected Brazilian culture. Before leaving Europe, he visited Paris, where he met Camille Saint-Saëns and Vincent d'Indy.

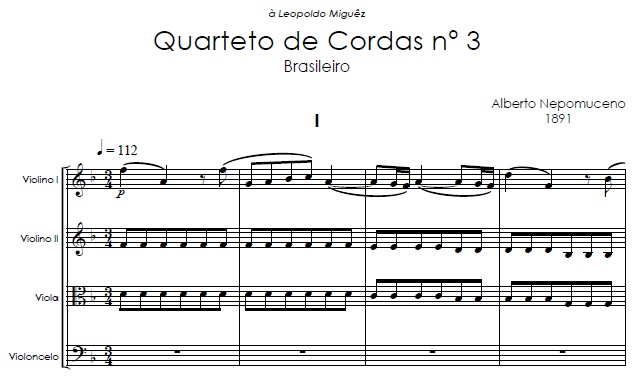
The opening of Nepomuceno's String Quartet No. 3

Upon his return to Brazil, he became the director and taught at the Instituto Nacional de Música (National Institute of Music) in Rio de Janeiro, where he strongly promoted the use of the Portuguese language in Brazilian classical music, instead of the preferred European languages such as French and Italian. In addition, Nepomuceno was a significant influence on many early 20th-century Brazilian nationalist composers such as Heitor Villa-Lobos, which became one of his students, Luciano Gallet, and Oscar Lorenzo Fernández.

Later on, Gustav Mahler engaged him to conduct at the Vienna Opera House, but illness prevented this from taking place. He returned to Europe in 1910 for a series of concerts in Brussels, Geneva and Paris. During this trip, he became friends with Claude Debussy. Back in Brazil, he championed the use of Portuguese in opera and song and remained the leading musical figure in the country until his death at age 56.

Among his prominent works is his String Quartet No. 3 "Brasileiro" (Brazilian). According to Nepomuceno's handwritten note, it was composed in Berlin in 1890. It is probably the earliest example of the integration of Brazilian folk melody with the Central European romantic idiom. The "Brasileiro" String Quartet remained unpublished until 2005, and was only rarely performed before then.

Also notable are the operas Abul (1905), Artemis (1898), Electra (1894) and O Garatuja (unfinished), the Orchestral Pieces (1888), the Sinfonia in G minor (1893) and the Serenata (1902).

=== O Guaratuja ===
Nepomuceno's operatic comedy O Guaratuja was written in 1904 with a libretto by the composer, but only the Preludio and the first act were completed. The debut of the Preludio took place at the Theatro Municipal in Rio de Janeiro in 1904 and was conducted by the composer himself. The work is written in a post-Romantic style and features popular motifs from 17th-century Rio de Janeiro combined with late 19th-century Brazilian popular rhythms to give the work a sense of local Brazilian character. Nepomuceno's O Guaratuja was adapted from the novel O Guaratuja: crônica dos tempos coloniais (The Scribbler: Chronicle of Colonial Times) by José de Alencar, whose historical, regionalist and Indianist novels were among the most popular and influential works of Brazilian literature during the mid-19th century. O Guaratuja is set in 1659 in the Brazilian colonial city of São Sebastião do Rio de Janeiro, which is present day Rio de Janeiro. "O Guaratuja" is the nickname of the protagonist of the story, who is an artist with a penchant for scribbling graffiti on the walls of urban buildings.
