= Nahim Marun =

- Origin: Brazil
- Genres: Contemporary music
- Occupations: Pianist and piano professor at the São Paulo State University
- Instrument: Piano
- Years active: 30

Nahim Marun is a Brazilian pianist and professor.

== Education ==
Marun’s principals piano teachers were the Brazilian pianist Isabel Mourao in São Paulo and the pianist Grant Johannesen in New York City, having completed a Master of Music degree in Piano Performance from the Mannes College of Music in New York City (under a CAPES scholarship).

He received a Doctor of Music degree from the Universidade Estadual de Campinas (under a FAPESP scholarship), with the thesis "The Piano Technique of Johannes Brahms", and pursued a Post-Doctorate at Université Paris-Sorbonne (Paris IV).

== Career ==
Marun teaches piano performance since 1998 at Universidade Estadual Paulista UNESP. He has recorded numerous albums with other Brazilian artists.
