= La Croce d'oro =

- Opera by Henrique Oswald
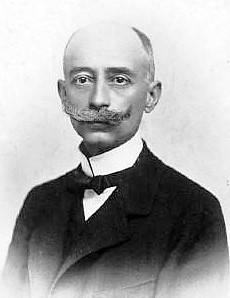
- Oswald in 1907
- Language: Italian

La croce d’oro (Italian for The Golden Cross) is an opera in 3 acts by Henrique Oswald to an Italian libretto. It was composed in 1872. No performances of it are registered. The work remains unpublished.

== History ==
The Golden Cross was the first opera composed by young Oswald. The librettist is not identified. The manuscript score consists of 237 pages.

In this work the composer prefers great sonorous masses and a dense orchestral texture. Concerning the voices and their relation with orchestra, it seems that he inclined to the dramatic school of voicing.

== Scoring ==
There are six main characters (2 sopranos, mezzo-soprano, tenor, bariton, bass) and a mixed chorus (SATB).

The orchestra consists of piccolo, flutes, oboes, clarinets (in B♭), bassoons; trumpets (in F), trombone (in F), bass trombone (ophicleide); harp; timpani, gran cassa, piatti; strings.

== Structure ==
The opera is divided in Italian manner into separate musical numbers: recitativos, arias, duets, quartets, choruses and intermezzi.
