= Piano Quartet No. 2 (Oswald) =

The Piano Quartet No. 2 in G major, Op. 26 by Henrique Oswald was composed in the second half of 1898. The string quartet is scored for piano, violin, viola and cello. The approximate duration is 25–30 minutes.

== History ==
=== Autograph manuscripts ===
There are two autograph manuscripts of the quartet. The first one is located at Departamento de Música of ECA/USP. It is incomplete: the first movement lacks four pages, and the fifth has only three initial pages. All the four finished movements are dated 1898: the first two are July 23 and 29, the last two are August 2 and 3. The work is titled "2o Quartetto op. 26" (The Second Quartet, Op. 26) and has a dedication: "al carissimo amico Emilio Giorgetti" (to the dearest friend Emilio Giorgetti).

The second manuscript is at Institute of Brazilian Studies, University of São Paulo. It is a complete and dated at the end: "Firenze, 25 ottobre 1898" (Florence, 25 October 1898). The title page has the same indication and dedication lines, though the opus number was added later, not by the composer.

It is the second autograph that presents the final form of the quartet, and there are three more manuscripts, non-autograph, built upon this one.

=== Producing the final version ===
The main difference between the two autographs is in the outer movements. It is not known whether Oswald completed the final movement of the first manuscript, a G major Molto allegro in 3/8 time: he may have done so (and then the continuation was just mislaid) or he may have given up the idea of this movement (which seems more probable). Whatever the reason, this music did not reach the final version.

Instead the composer moved the original first movement, the G major Molto allegro in alla breve time, to the end of the quartet, making it the finale. This called for changes to the score, but without affecting the structure of it. While doing so, Oswald opted for a new first movement. It is known today as the G major Allegro moderato, also in alla breve time. However, this tempo indication does not appear in the autograph, it is taken from the other manuscripts and was also printed in all the concert programs during the composer's lifetime.

=== Performance history ===
This quartet belongs to a group of compositions by Oswald which he preferred to perform at his recitals, the others being the Piano Trio, Op. 9, the Piano Quintet, Op. 18 and the chamber version of the Piano Concerto, Op. 10.

On 6 July 1899, the composer performed it for Camille Saint-Saëns, who was visiting São Paulo. The piece had a great effect on the French musician, who addressed Oswald thus: "I am delighted. It is a piece of a master and above all very personal. You are an artist, monsieur".

== Music ==
The quintet is in five movements. The tempo indications, slightly different in manuscripts, are unified by José Eduardo Martins in his edition.

1. Allegro moderato – G major
2. Andante con moto (Tema e variações) – E minor
3. Prestissimo (Scherzo) – C major
4. Adagio (Romanza)
5. Molto allegro – G major

The first movement begins with an ostinato accompaniment in the left hand part of the piano. It is a sonata form with the second subject in D major.

The second movement is a series of variations on a theme in E minor. The piano states the ABA form theme, as the strings accompany it. The first variations is a violin pizzicato melody with piano staccato accompaniment. In the second variation, the melody is again by the strings, while the piano provides back plan figures. The third variation has a syncopated version of the theme. The fourth variation brings a change: it is in E major with a smooth melody in the violin part. After this comes a repetition of the first section theme, again in E minor.

The scherzo is in ternary form with a contrasting intense trio.

In the fourth movement, the melody is led at first by the cello, proclaiming the long notes. Then the other instruments follow it.

The finale ends with a sweet refrain sung by all the four instruments.

== Editions ==
At Departamento de Música of ECA/USP there is a printed version of the cello part of the quartet (only the first movement) published by Edizione Nuova Revizione. However no Oswald domestic catalogue or family correspondence mentions such an edition, though they used to emphasize any new edition in letters and diaries.

The quartet remained unpublished until 2001, when José Eduardo Martins made a critical edition of it:

- Henrique Oswald (2001). Quarteto em sol maior opus 26, piano, violino, viola e violoncelo. EdUSP. ISBN 978-85-314-0628-7.

== Recordings ==
- (2003) Henrique Oswald: Quarteto para piano e cordas op. 26, Sonata-Fantasia para violoncelo e piano op. 44, Concerto para piano e orquestra op. 10 (em versão para piano e quinteto de cordas realizada pelo autor) – Quarteto Rubio, Pascal Smets (double bass), José Eduardo Martins (piano) – Música de Concerto MC004 (CD)
- (2010/2011) Henrique Oswald: Música de câmara (Integral dos quartetos de cordas; Integral dos quartetos com piano; Quinteto com piano Op. 18; Trio com piano Op. 45; Sonata-Fantasia Op. 44; Elegia para cello e piano) – ArsBrasil (violin: Artur Roberto Huf, Samuel Lima; viola: André Rodrigues, Valdeci Merquiori; cello: Gêneses Oliveira, Mauro Brucoli, Renato Oliveira), Fernando Lopes (piano) – Ariah Cultural (3 CDs)
- (2013) Henrique Oswald: Música de câmara (Quinteto para piano e cordas, op. 18; Quarteto para piano e cordas, op. 26; Piccolo trio para violino, violoncelo e piano; Elegia para violoncelo e piano; Canto elegíaco para violino e piano) – Eduardo Monteiro (piano), Betina Stegmann (violin), Nelson Rios (violin), Marcelo Jaffé (viola), Robert Suetholz (cello) – LAMI 012 (CD)
- (2014) Henrique Oswald: Quarteto com piano, op. 26; Quinteto com piano, op. 18 – Ricardo Castro (piano), Quarteto OSESP: Emmanuele Baldini (violin), Davi Graton (violin), Peter Pas (viola, Quarteto), Cláudio Cruz (viola, Quinteto), Johannes Gramsch (cello) – OSESP Selo Digital 6 (digital release)
