= String Quartet No. 2 (Oswald) =

The String Quartet No. 2 in E minor, Op. 17, by Henrique Oswald belongs to the most prolific years of his Italian period (1890s). The string quartet used to be known under the title Quarteto Brasileiro (The Brazilian Quartet).

== Structure ==
The quartet is in four movements:

1. Allegro agitato
2. Lento / Adagietto
3. Scherzo / Presto
4. Molto allegro

== Recordings ==
- (1971) Heitor Villa-Lobos: Quarteto No. 16; Henrique Oswald: Quarteto Brasileiro – Quarteto Brasileiro da UFRJ – CBS 160174 (LP)
  - Reissued on CD: Boccherini, Siquera, Henrique Oswald, Villa-Lobos – Quarteto Brasileiro da UFRJ – ?? (CD)
- (2010/2011) Henrique Oswald: Música de câmara (Integral dos quartetos de cordas; Integral dos quartetos com piano; Quinteto com piano Op. 18; Trio com piano Op. 45; Sonata-Fantasia Op. 44; Elegia para cello e piano) – ArsBrasil (violin: Artur Roberto Huf, Samuel Lima; viola: André Rodrigues, Valdeci Merquiori; cello: Gêneses Oliveira, Mauro Brucoli, Renato Oliveira), Fernando Lopes (piano) – Ariah Cultural (3 CDs)
