= Alfredo Napoleão =

Portuguese pianist and composer

Alfredo Napoleão dos Santos (31 January 1852, Porto – 20 November 1917, Lisbon) was a Portuguese pianist and composer. He was the youngest of three Napoleão pianist and composer siblings, the others being Arthur Napoleão (1843–1925), and Aníbal Napoleão (1845–1880).

== Biography ==
Their parents were Portuguese, musician Alexandre Napoleão and Joaquina Maria dos Santos. The latter died, when Alfredo was only a year old. The father worked in London, and Alfredo spent his childhood with his maternal grandmother in Porto, his birthplace. In 1858 he was brought to London to study with a certain Professor Wood. These studies continued up to 1868, when he went to Brazil, like his two brothers.

In 1869 he gave his debut recital in Rio de Janeiro, with great success. He made an extensive tour through the country and settled in Buenos Aires, and then in Montevideo, where he taught piano. In 1879 he was again in Rio de Janeiro and for some years toured the northern parts of Brazil. At that time he was at the height of his fame.

Returning to Portugal in 1882, he gave concerts in Lisbon and Porto, then London and Paris. In 1889 he went to Brazil again and made a tour through the entire continent. In 1891 he returned to Porto.

Alfredo Napoleão was a great interpreter of Bach, Beethoven and Schumann.

== Compositions ==
Alfredo Napoleão's compositions include four piano concertos, a Polonaise for piano and orchestra, an Ouverture symphonique for large orchestra, chamber music, piano sonatas and many piano pieces.

=== List of works (selective) ===
For piano

- Op.1 - Estrella d'Alva, Polka brilhante
- Op.2 - Fantaisie sur Les bavards de J. Offenbach
- Op.3 - Fantaisie de salon sur Le pont des soupirs, opera bouffe de J. Offenbach
- Op.12 - Grande fantaisie de concert sur le Carnaval de Venise
- Op.29 - Reminiscences de Aida de Verdi, Grande fantaisie
- Op.36 - Tableaux, Suite de petites piéces caractéristiques (Porto: Costa Mesquita, ca.1882)

(Les Acrobates; Le Retour du Troubadour; Bonheur supréme; Danse Villageoise; Je t'en supplie; Marche des nobles)

- Op.41 - Prelude and Fugue in F-sharp minor (London: Augener, ca.1888)
- Op.54 - Trois romances (Un Soir de Printemps; Le Rêve; Exhaussée!)
- Op.60 - Diva, Valse (Porto: Raymundo de Macedo, ca.1913)
- Se sa minga, opera de Carlos Gomes: Polka

For piano and orchestra

- Op.27 - Andante et Polonaise de concert
- Op.31 - Piano Concerto No. 2 in E-flat minor

== Discography ==
- (rec. 2013) Piano Concerto No. 2 – Artur Pizarro (piano), BBC National Orchestra of Wales, Martyn Brabbins (conductor) – Hyperion CDA67984
