= Le Fate (opera) =

Le fate
- Opera by Henrique Oswald
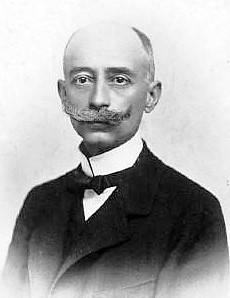
- Oswald in 1907
- Librettist: Eduardo Filippi
- Language: Italian

Le fate (Italian for The Fairies) is an opera in 2 acts (fiaba musicale in due parti — musical fairy-tale in 2 parts) by Henrique Oswald to an Italian libretto by Eduardo Filippi. It is the last of Oswald's three operas, composed in 1902–1903. It is known of no performances of this work. It remains unpublished.

== History ==
=== Dating and manuscripts ===
The dating of the opera comes from a manuscript (now at Arquivo Nacional in Rio de Janeiro) of the complete score, having "Firenze, 1902–1903" on the title page. It consists of 259 pages.

Another manuscript contains a vocal score arranged by the composer, it is at the library of Escola de Comunicações a Artes. The first part of it in written on Italian paper, while the second is on Brazilian. At the end of the first part there is a dating by Oswald: "Outubro de 1902, Villa Speranza"; at the ends of the second part: "Outubro de 1904, Rio Comprido".

There is also a separate manuscript with a vocal score of Ulina's aria, on Brazilian paper, undated.

=== Style ===
Unlike two other operas by Oswald, this one includes a ballet.

== Roles ==
There are only three singing roles:

- Ulina, regina delle fate [a fairy queen] (soprano)
- Brunello, uomo della terra [an earthly man] (tenor)
- Lurchetto, satiro [a satyr] (baritone)

Choruses and dancers include fairies, satyrs, bacchantes, vampires, soldiers and sailors.

== Scoring ==
The orchestra consists of:

- piccolo, 3 flutes, 2 oboes, English horn, 2 clarinets (in A and Bb), bass clarinet (in A and Bb), 2 bassoons, contrabassoon
- 4 horns (in F), 3 trumpets (in F), 3 trombones, bass tuba
- timpani
- percussion
- 2 harps
- strings

== Synopsis ==
The action takes place in a grotto near the isle of Cyprus, in the kingdom of the fairy Ulina.

After the overture comes the chorus Eterna giovinezza allieta il nostro cor. The plot is based on Ulina's love towards Brunello, who doesn't love her. At the end he defends the fairy from the soldiers, who try to hurt her, without being able to prevent her death, but just in time to declare his love.

== Editions ==
A complete edition of the opera is being prepared by Brazilian scholars. By 2016, four selected numbers have already been published in vocal scores:

- Piangere voglio, Ária de Ulina da ópera Le Fate, para soprano e piano: Edição de Filipe Fonseca. – Cantabile Edições Musicais (CA0003), ©2016. 2 p.
- Ho sulla terra, Ária de Brunello da ópera Le Fate, para tenor e piano: Edição de Filipe Fonseca. – Cantabile Edições Musicais (CA0004), ©2016. 3 p.
- Bevi ed innebriati, Ária de Lurchetto da ópera Le Fate, para baritono e piano: Edição de Filipe Fonseca. – Cantabile Edições Musicais (CA0005), ©2016.
- Nell'anima dell'essere, Coro da ópera Le Fate, para coro SSAATTBB e piano: Edição de Filipe Fonseca. – Cantabile Edições Musicais (CA0006), ©2016. 8 p.
