= Arthur Napoleão dos Santos =

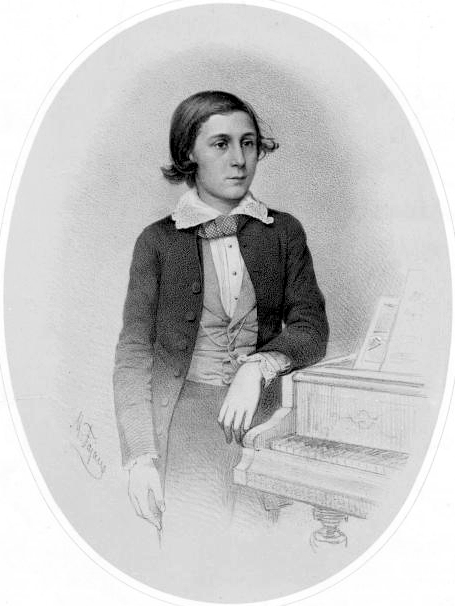
- Arthur Napoleão, Warsaw, ca. 1860
- Born: 6 March 1843; Porto, Kingdom of Portugal
- Died: 12 May 1925 (aged 82); Rio de Janeiro, Brazil
- Occupations: Composer, pianist, instrument dealer and music publisher

Arthur Napoleão dos Santos (6 March 1843 – 12 May 1925) was a Portuguese composer, pianist, instrument dealer and music publisher. He was brother of Aníbal Napoleão and Alfredo Napoleão, who like Arthur were pianists and composers.

== Biography ==
He was born in Porto, Portugal, and gave his first piano concert at the age of 7. When he was 8, supported by Ferdinand II of Portugal, Napoleão gave his first international concerts, visiting cities such as London (where he played at the Portuguese Embassy in the city) and Paris. Thereafter he toured all over Europe and America, sometimes playing duets with Henri Vieuxtemps or Henryk Wieniawski. At age 15, he performed in New York and critic Richard Storrs Willis attended "out of curiosity to see the sort of child that tickles Europe". Willis was impressed and noted him as "an extraordinary performer... His touch is exquisitely full of tenderness; his precision almost unerring; his power more than respectable, and his rounding of musical thought perfectly delightful."

In 1866 he settled in Brazil, living in Rio de Janeiro. Here he set up shop to sell instruments and publish sheet music. He taught piano lessons, one of his pupils was Chiquinha Gonzaga and composed, almost exclusively piano pieces. He died in Rio de Janeiro, Brazil, aged 82. He is the Patron of Chair 18 of the Brazilian Academy of Music.

== Works ==
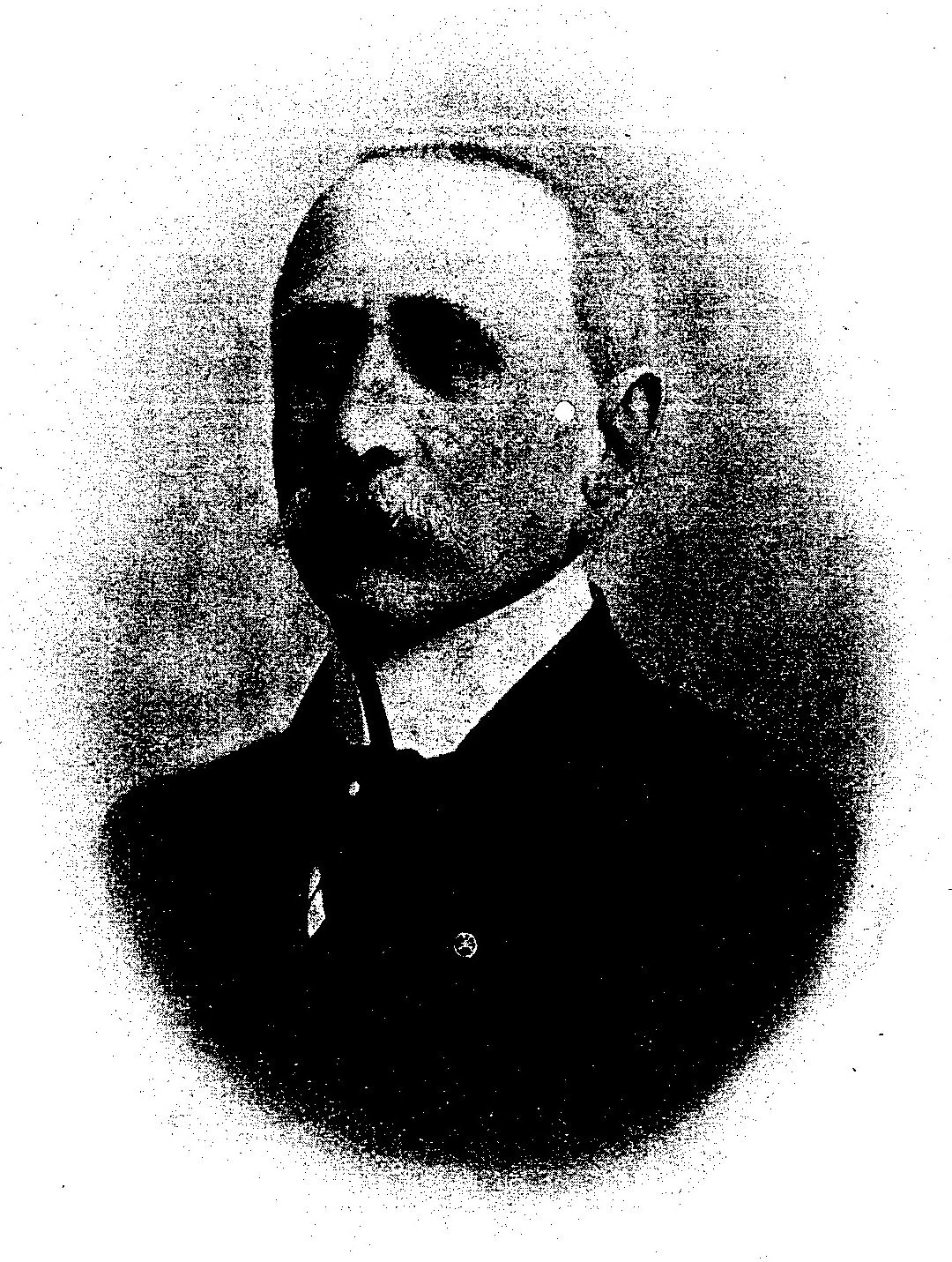
Arthur Napoleão in the 1900s

Arthur Napoleão composed piano music in all principal genres of his time: opera fantasies and paraphrases, etudes, character pieces, salon and virtuoso pieces. There were also several compositions for orchestra (mostly lost), for piano 4-hands and half a dozen songs. He wrote incidental music for O remorso vivo by Furtado Coelho and Joaquim Serra (first staged Feb 21, 1867).

Napoleão's last work to get an Opus number was 18 Études pour virtuoses, Op.90 (published in 1910). Summarizing his vast pianistic experience, it remains his most significant composition. His most popular piece was Romance, Op.71 no.1, of which several arrangements were published.
