= José Eduardo Martins (pianist) =

José Eduardo Gandra da Silva Martins, born 1938, is a Brazilian concert pianist.

== Career ==
He began his career with a performance at the Colombo Theater in São Paulo on December 10, 1954, which included contemporary works by Dmitri Shostakovich.

Martins was professor at the University of São Paulo between 1981-2004.

He recorded several albums with compositions by Henrique Oswald, including his cello sonatas No. 1 and No. 2, Piano Quartet No. 2, and Piano Quintet.

He has commissioned works from the composer Gilberto Mendes, including Um Estudo? Eisler e Webern Caminham nos Mares do Sul...(1989).

== Honours ==
- Officer of the Belgian Order of the Crown
- Doctor Honoris Causa from the Constantin Brâncuși University of Târgu Jiu
- Order of Rio Branco
