= The Rubio Quartet =

Belgian string quartet

The Rubio Quartet are a Flemish string quartet. They formed in Belgium in 1991 and are named after the late English instrument maker David Rubio. The quartet comprises Dirk van de Velde and Dirk Van den Hauwe (violin), Marc Sonnaert (viola) and Peter Devos (cello).

The quartet recorded the complete cycle of Dmitri Shostakovich string quartets in 2002. They have toured extensively in Europe, America and Japan.
