= Francisco Braga =

Brazilian music composer (1868–1945)

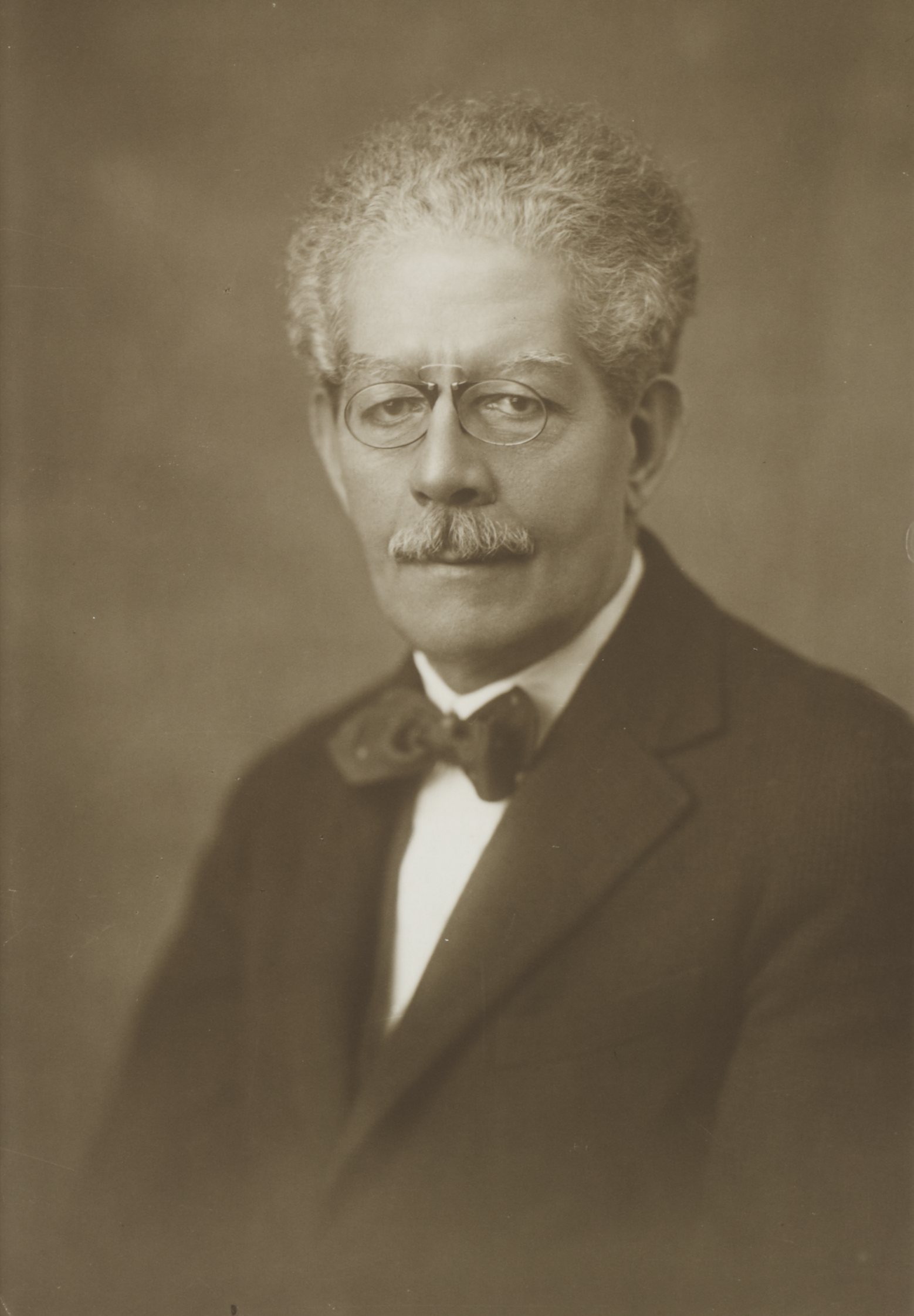
- Born: 15 April 1868; Rio de Janeiro, Empire of Brazil
- Died: 14 March 1945 (aged 76); Rio de Janeiro, Brazil
- Occupation: Composer

Antônio Francisco Braga (15 April 1868 – 14 March 1945) was a Brazilian music composer. Braga was born in Rio de Janeiro, and studied with Luiz António de Moura and Carlos de Mesquita. In 1886, he founded the Sociedade de Concertos Populares. In 1906, his composition Hino à Bandeira was adopted as the Brazilian national flag anthem. Starting in 1890 Antônio Francisco Braga studied at the Conservatoire in Paris with Jules Massenet. After that he spent time both in Germany and in Italy and then returned to Brazil in 1900. Upon his return to Brazil, Antônio Francisco Braga taught at the Instituto Nacional de Música and was the conductor of the Sociedade de Concertos Sinfonicos between 1908 and 1933. His pupils included Brazilian composers Cacilda Borges Barbosa and Hilda Pires dos Reis.

Antônio Francisco Braga composed three operas and produced orchestral pieces, chamber music, piano pieces and many songs.

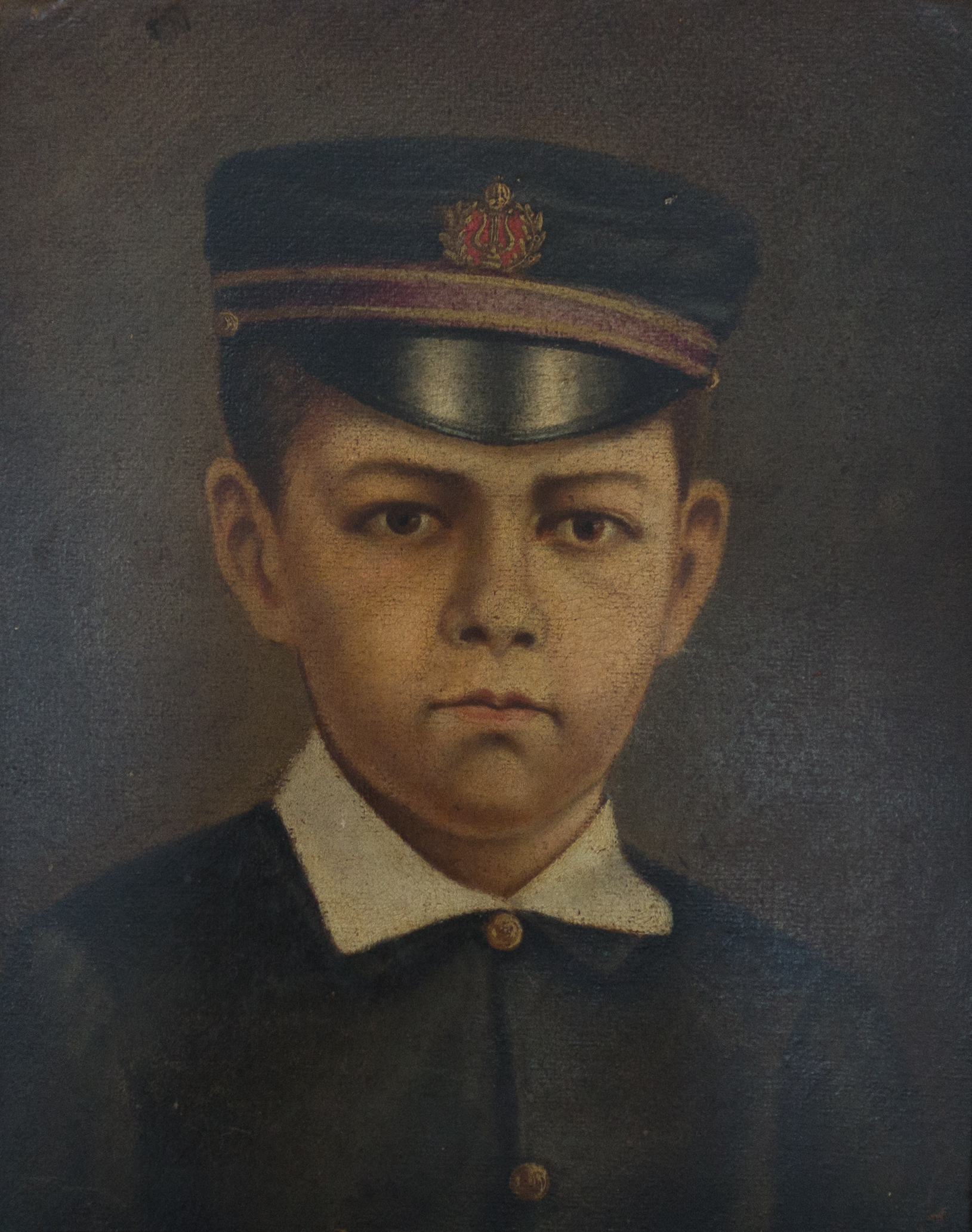
A portrait of Francisco Braga during his childhood, 1870s

== Works ==
- Missa de S. Francisco Xavier (s.d.)
- Missa de S. Sebastião (s.d.)
- Te Deum (s.d.)
- Stabat Mater (s.d.)
- Trezena de S. Francisco de Paula (s.d.)
- A Paz, poem with chorus (s.d.)
- Oração pela Pátria, poem with chorus (s.d.)
- Trio, para piano, violin e cello (s.d.)
- Dois Quintetos (s.d.)
- Quarteto for woodwind and brasses (s.d.)
- Virgens Mortas, song with lyrics by Olavo Bilac (s.d.)
- Trovador do Sertão, for voice and band (s.d.)
- Hino à juventude brasileira (s.d.)
- Hino à Paz (s.d.)
- Paysage (1895)
- Cauchemar (1896)
- Brasil, marcha (1898)
- Marabá, symphonic poem, first work dedicated to Brazil (1898)
- Episódio Sinfônico (1898)
- Jupira, opera (1898)
- A Pastoral, lyric episode (1903)
- Hino à Bandeira Nacional (1905)
- Canto de Outono, for string orchestra (1908)
- O Contratador de Diamantes, incidental music (1908)
- Insônia, symphonic poem (1908)
- Anita Garibaldi, opera (1912–1922)
- Many military marches, like Barão do Rio Branco, Satanás and Dragões da Independência
