= Clelia Iruzun =

Brazilian pianist based in London

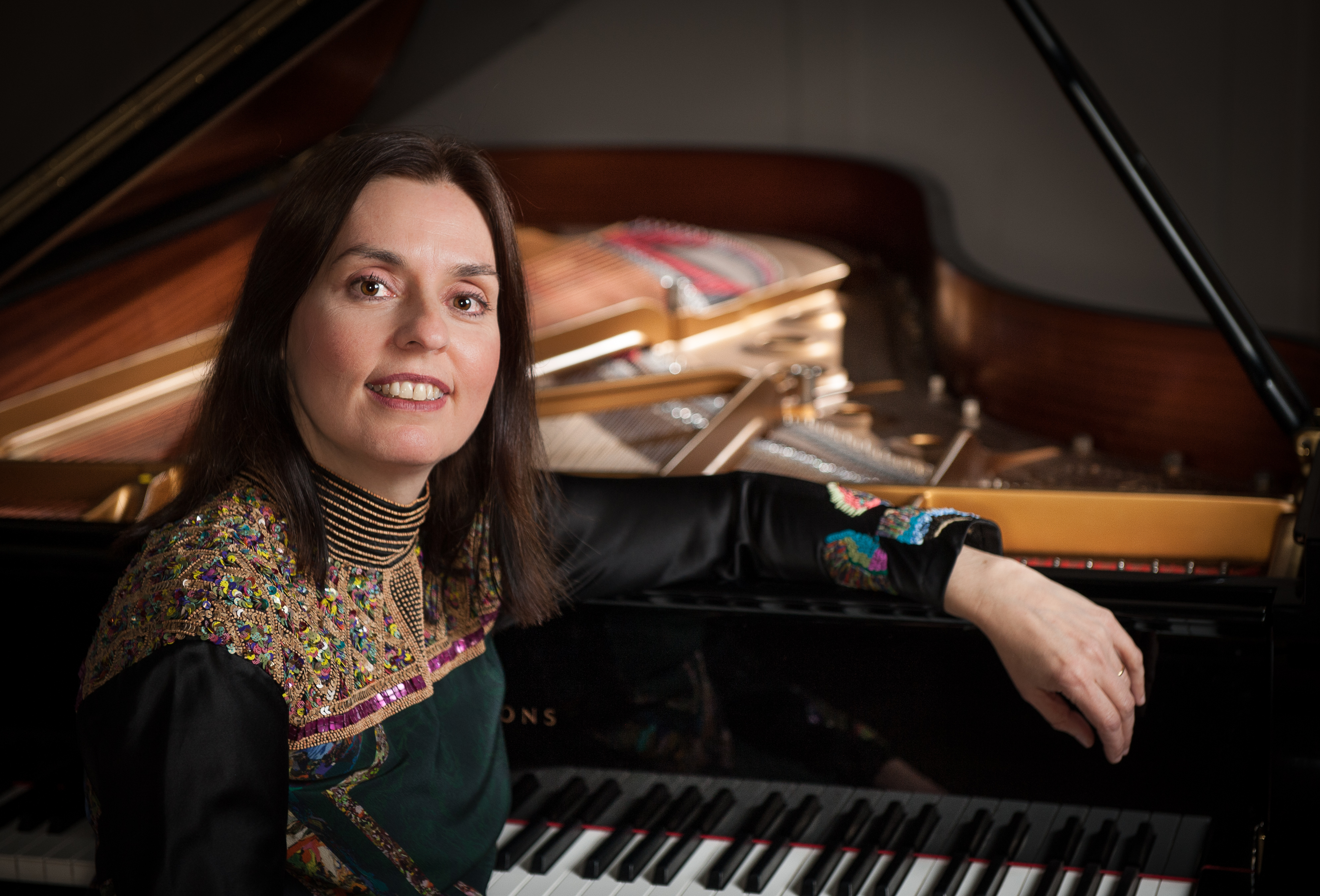
Clelia Iruzun

Clelia Iruzun is a Brazilian pianist based in London.

== Early life ==
Clelia Iruzun was born in Rio de Janeiro, Brazil. She started playing by ear at the age of four years, subsequently beginning piano lessons with Maria Augusta Brasil da Silva and Dulce Vaz de Siqueira. From the age of seven she took part in several piano competitions and won many prizes. At 9 she entered the School of Music of the University of Rio de Janeiro where she studied with Anna Carolina Pereira da Silva and Arnaldo Cohen. From an early age she played for several pianists such as Jacques Klein and Nelson Freire and for composers Francisco Mignone and Arnaldo Rebello, both of whom dedicated works to Iruzun. She also had lessons with Ruth Cerrone and Miguel Proença, before winning a scholarship from the German Academic Exchange Service (DAAD). She instead travelled to London where she studied with Maria Curcio, who awarded her a scholarship and later entered the Royal Academy of Music where she studied piano with Christopher Elton and conducting with Colin Metters. She graduated in 1988 with the Recital Diploma and several prizes. After leaving the Academy she studied with Noretta Conci and Merces de Silva Telles, a Brazilian pupil of Claudio Arrau. She also played for Stephen Kovacevich and Fou Ts’Ong. By then she had already won many international competition prizes, including the Tunbridge Wells, the Paloma O'Shea International Piano Competition and Pilar Bayona in Zaragoza.

== Career ==
In 1988, Iruzun made her Wigmore Hall début and since then she has performed all over Europe, Scandinavia, the US, China and Brazil, including concerts at the Grand Theatre and City Theatre in Shanghai, the Forbidden City Concert Hall and Concert Hall of the Peking University in Beijing, Konserthusets in Gothenburg and Stockholm, Poznan Philharmonie, Queen Elizabeth Hall, Purcell Room, Wigmore Hall in London and Theatro Municipal in Rio de Janeiro and São Paulo, Sala Cecília Meireles in her native Brazil where she tours every year. She has also appeared several times on radio and television in many countries, including broadcasts for BBC Radio 3. She has performed over 25 piano concertos, including some by Spanish and Latin American composers together with several chamber music pieces. In her concerts Iruzun tries to combine her love for Classical and Romantic music with new music, especially by Latin American composers. She has premiered a number or works by Brazilian composers, including the piano Quintet by Henrique Oswald and the Octet by Heitor Villa-Lobos in the UK, João Guilherme Ripper's Piano Sonata, Desafio for Piano and Guitar and Sonata Breve by Marlos Nobre at the South Bank Centre and Wigmore Hall. She has also played piano concertos such as the Mignone's Fantasia No. 3 in Norway with the Kristiansand Orchestra, in London with Lontano Ensemble and in Poland with the Poznan Philharmonic where she also premiered the Concertante do Imaginario by Marlos Nobre. From her experiences of playing Latin American repertoire in Europe, she founded the festival Brazil Three Centuries of Music which aims to showcase Brazilian music in the UK launched at the Southbank Centre, London in November 2011, with a performance of the Piano Quintet, Op. 18 by Henrique Oswald.

She has also premiered English music by Arnold Bax and York Bowen in Brazil. She is married to Renato Martins and they live in London with their two children, Raphael and Maria Clara. She has recorded several CDs from Villa-Lobos and other Latin American composers to Concertos by Mendelssohn and Elizabeth Maconchy. Iruzun is very interested in Philosophy and has recently completed a master's degree at the Birkbeck College, University of London writing on “Plato, Music and Education”.

== Discography ==
- VILLA-LOBOS- Piano Music (Duo 1992; Meridian 2005)
- LATIN AMERICAN DANCES- (Intim Musik 1998)
- MENDELSSOHN- Concertos – Vasteras Sinfonietta, Joachim Gustafsson (Intim Musik 1999)
- THE WALTZ ALBUM-(Intim Musik 2002)
- BRAZILIAN MOSAIC-(Lorelt 2003)
- LECUONA-Ernesto e Ernestina (Lorelt 2005)
- MIGNONE-Piano Music (Lorelt 2007)
- ELIZABETH MACONCHY-Orchestra Music, BBC Scottish Symphony Orchestra (Lorelt 2011)
- MARLOS NOBRE-Piano Music (Lorelt 2012)
- FEDERICO MOMPOU-Selection of Piano Music, vol I (SOMM Recordings 2012)
- THE GOLDEN YEARS- Marcelo Barboza (flute) and Clelia Iruzun (piano) (Meridian 2014)
- ERNESTO NAZARETH-Portrait of Rio (Lorelt 2015) http://www.lorelt.co.uk/cds/lnt/nazareth_portrait_of_rio
- FEDERICO MOMPOU-Selection of Piano Music, vol II (SOMM Recordings 2016) http://www.somm-recordings.com/somm/ifield.php?id=240
- MIGNONE & ALBENIZ-Piano Concertos by Albeniz and Mignone, Jac Van Steen and Royal Philharmonic Orchestra (SOMM Recordings 2017) https://www.somm-recordings.com/recording/francisco-mignone-piano-concerto-isaac-albeniz-concierto-fantastico-for-piano-and-orchestra/
- CAMILLE SAINT-SAËNS-Piano Concerto n°5, HENRIQUE OSWALD-Piano Concerto op.10, ALBERTO NEPOMUCENO-Suite Antigua, op.11, Jac Van Steen and Royal Philharmonic Orchestra (SOMM Recordings 2020)
- Treasures from the New World, Volume 3 (with Fabio Zanon, guitar and Marcelo Barboza, flute). SOMM Recordings, 2023.
- Manuel de Falla: Nights in the Gardens of Spain, with Jac van Steen (cond) and the Ulster Orchestra (SOMM Recordings, 2025. SOMMCD 0694)
