= Brazilian Symphony Orchestra =

- Native name: Orquestra Sinfônica Brasileira
- Short name: OSB
- Founded: 11 July 1940; 85 years ago
- Location: Rio de Janeiro, Brazil
- Concert hall: Cidade das Artes; Theatro Municipal; Sala Cecília Meireles
- Principal conductor: Pablo Castellar
- Website: osb.br

The Brazilian Symphony Orchestra (Portuguese: Orquestra Sinfônica Brasileira, OSB) is a Brazilian orchestra. Founded in 1940, it is located at Avenida Rio Branco, downtown Rio de Janeiro. It is one of the country's foremost orchestras, performing more than 5,000 concerts since its inauguration.

== History ==
The creation of the OSB was an idea of three teachers of the National School of Music – Djalma Soares, Antão Soares and Antônio Leopardi. Excited by the NBC Orchestra tour of Brazil, under the direction of Arturo Toscanini, they sought maestro José Siqueira to take the initiative. With the support of corporate and political personalities and with special publicity in the newspaper O Globo, the OSB emerged as a corporation in 1940. The inaugural concert was on Thursday, 11 July 1940, a date chosen in honor of the composer Carlos Gomes, his birthday. As their first artistic director was nominated the Hungarian conductor exiled in Brazil, Eugen Szenkar.

== Members ==
=== Directors ===
- Eugen Szenkar (1940–1948)
- Lamberto Baldi (1949–1951)
- Eleazar de Carvalho (1952–1957, 1960–1962, 1966–1969)
- Alceo Bocchino (1963–1965)
- Isaac Karabtchevsky (1969–1994)
- Roberto Tibiriçá (1995–1997)
- Yeruham Scharovsky (1998–2004)
- Roberto Minczuk (2005–2011)
- Pablo Castellar and Fernando Bicudo (2011–2012)
- Pablo Castellar (2012–present)

=== Council presidents ===
- Arnaldo Guinle (1940–1948, 1956–1962)
- Adalberto de Lara Resende (1948–1952)
- Euvaldo Lodi (1952–1956)
- Luís Guimarães Filho (1962–1964)
- Murilo Miranda (1964–1965)
- Eugênio Gudin (1966–1968)
- Otávio Gouveia de Bulhões (1968–1986)
- Mário Henrique Simonsen (1987–1996)
- Roberto Paulo Cezar de Andrade (1997)

=== Concert masters ===
- Ricardo Odnoposoff (1940–1942)
- Oscar Borgeth (1942–1945)
- Henry Siegel (1945–1946)
- Santino Parpinelli (1945–1946)
- Anselmo Zlatopolski (1947–1965)
- Gian Carlo Pareschi (1965–1966)
- Francisco Corujo (1966–1977)
- Israel Terc Malziac (1974–1977)
- João Daltro de Almeida (1978–1993)
- Ricardo Cyncynates (1981–1984)
- Michel Bessler (1977–2015)
- Martin Tuksa (2000)

=== Most active soloists ===
Followed by number of concerts

- Nelson Freire (piano) (89)
- Jacques Klein (piano) (82)
- Arthur Moreira Lima (piano) (63)
- Arnaldo Cohen (piano) (42)
- Noel Devos (bassoon) (40)
- Ruth Staerke (singing) (35)
- Arnaldo Estrela (piano) (33)
- Zwinglio Faustini (singing) (30)
- Anselmo Zlatopolski (violin) (29)
- João de Souza Lima (piano) (29)
- Magdalena Tagliaferro (piano) (28)
