= Nelson Freire =

Brazilian classical pianist (1944-2021)

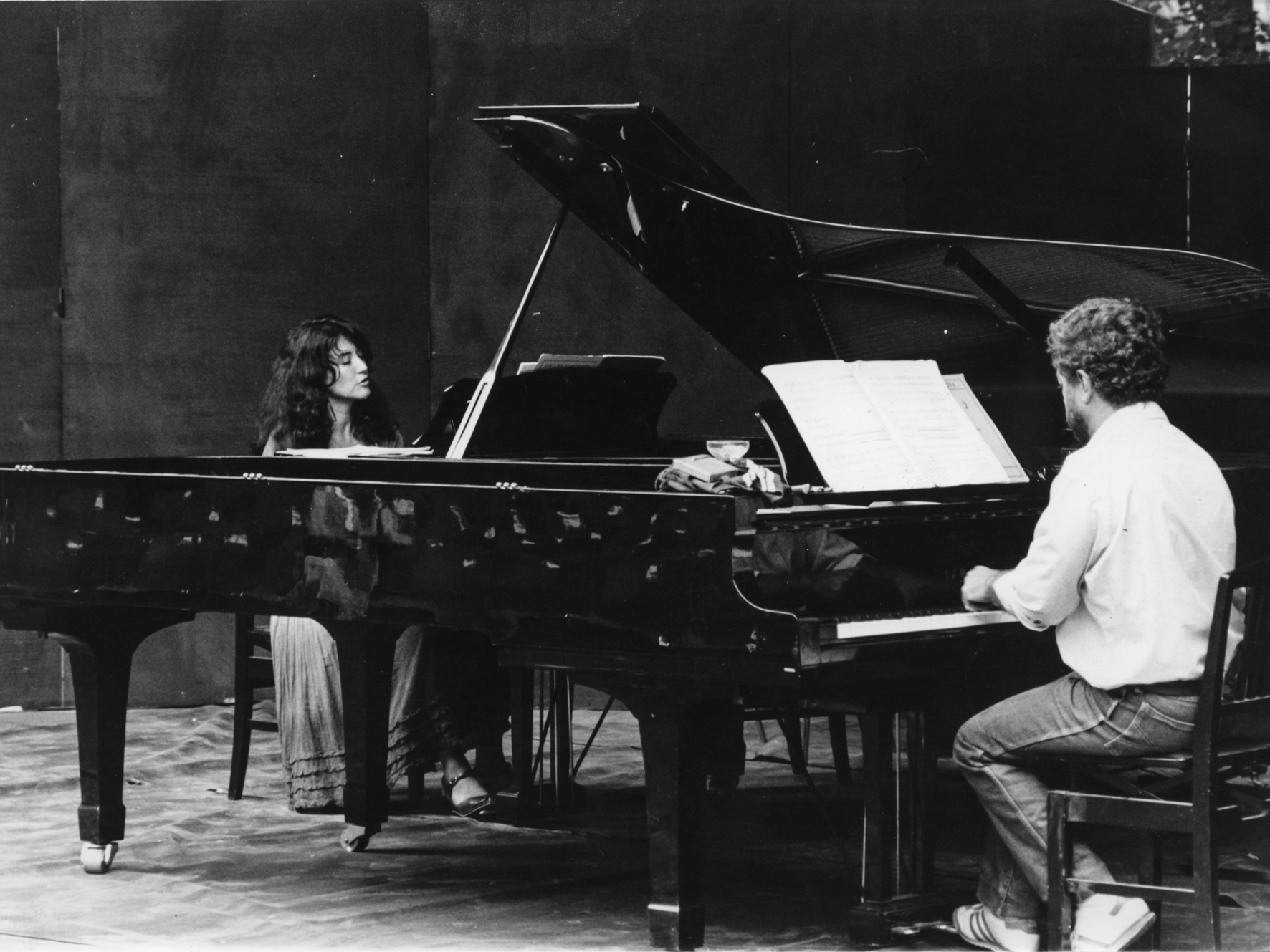
- Martha Argerich and Nelson Freire at the Festival de La Roque-d'Anthéron

Background information
- Born: Nelson José Pinto Freire; 18 October 1944; Boa Esperança, Minas Gerais, Brazil
- Died: 1 November 2021 (aged 77) Rio de Janeiro, Brazil
- Genre: Classical music
- Occupation: Pianist
- Instrument: Piano
- Years active: 1959–2021
- Labels: CBS/Columbia; Sony Classical; Teldec; Philips; Decca; Deutsche Grammophon; Berlin Classics
- Spouse: Miguel Rosário
- Awards: Vianna da Motta International Music Competition; Gramophone Award; Diapason d'Or; Latin Grammy Award; ECHO Klassik; International Classical Music Awards Lifetime Achievement Award; Konex Mercosur Prize; Commandeur of the Ordre des Arts et des Lettres; Chevalier of the Legion of Honour

Nelson José Pinto Freire (Portuguese pronunciation: [ˈnɛwsõ ˈfɾejɾ(i)]; 18 October 1944 – 1 November 2021) was a Brazilian classical pianist.

A child prodigy from Minas Gerais, Freire studied in Rio de Janeiro and Vienna before winning the Vianna da Motta International Music Competition in 1964. He played music from Bach and Beethoven to Chopin, Schumann, Brahms, Debussy, Liszt and Brazilian composers. Romantic music formed much of his concert and recorded repertory.

He performed with orchestras in Europe, the Americas and Asia, working with conductors including Pierre Boulez, Riccardo Chailly, Charles Dutoit, Valery Gergiev, Eugen Jochum, Lorin Maazel, Kurt Masur, Seiji Ozawa and André Previn. Martha Argerich was one of his closest friends and his most frequent piano-duo partner.

Freire recorded for CBS/Columbia, Sony, Teldec, Philips, Decca, Deutsche Grammophon and Berlin Classics. His recordings received the Edison Award, the Gramophone Award, the Diapason d'Or, the ECHO Klassik and a Latin Grammy Award. He was nominated three times for a Grammy Award.

== Early life and education ==
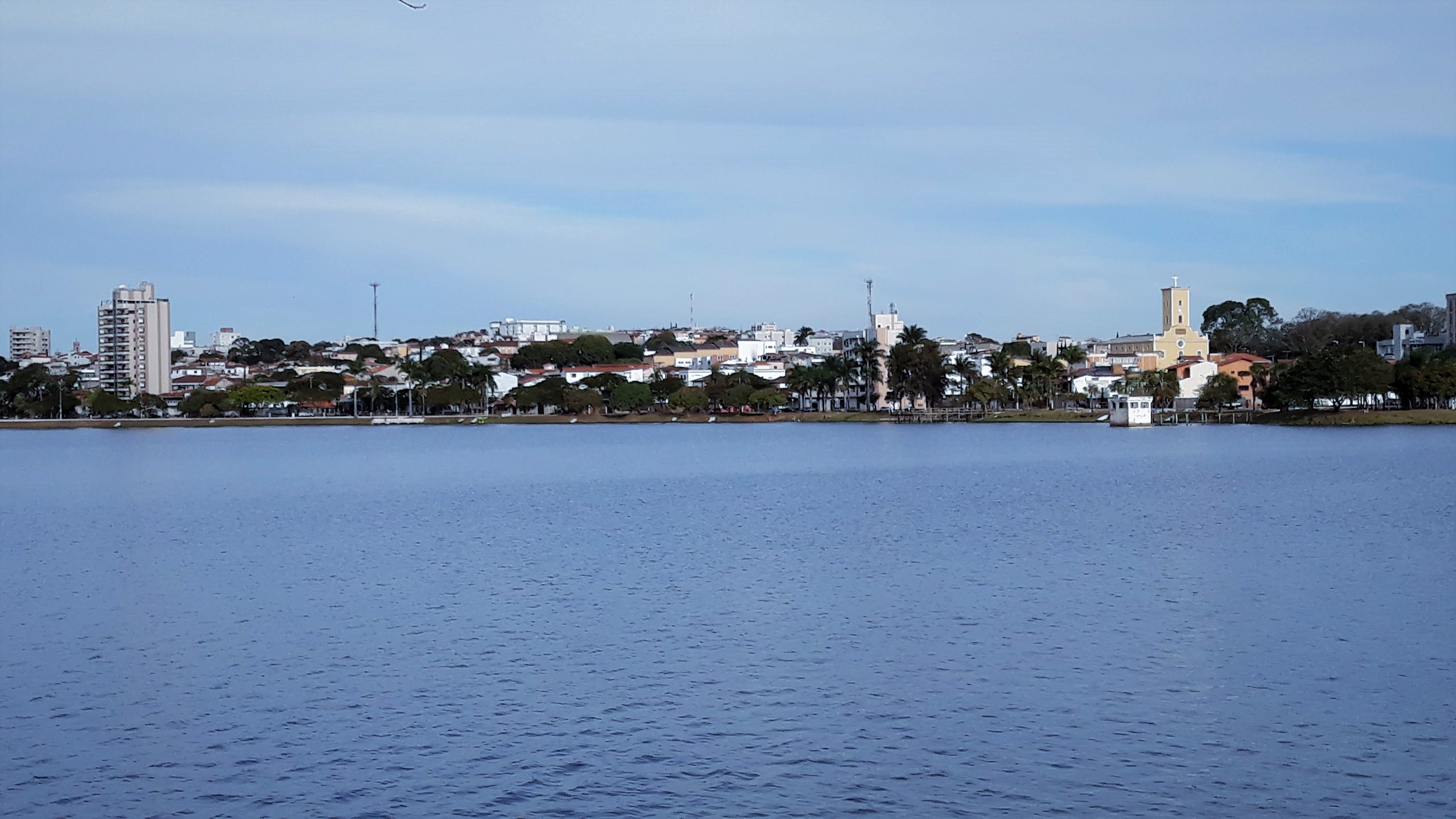
Boa Esperança, Minas Gerais, where Freire was born in 1944

Freire was born in Boa Esperança, Minas Gerais, on 18 October 1944. His family had a piano at home, and as a small child he began playing by ear, imitating music played by his older sister Nelma. Concert biographies usually date the beginning of his piano studies to the age of three, although Freire later remembered beginning to play at four. His first public performance came in childhood, when he played Mozart's Piano Sonata in A major, K. 331.

Before the family moved to Rio de Janeiro, Freire travelled once a week to study with a teacher who lived hours from Boa Esperança. After a short period, the teacher told his parents that he needed more advanced instruction in Rio, then the Brazilian capital. The family moved there when he was about six. His father left his pharmacy in Boa Esperança and took a bank job so that Freire could continue studying in the city.

In Rio, Freire studied with Lúcia Branco and Nise Obino. Branco had studied with Arthur De Greef, a pupil of Franz Liszt, while Obino had been Branco's pupil and assistant. Freire later credited Obino with rebuilding his technique from the beginning, including the position of his hands at the keyboard. He remembered her as the teacher who most changed his playing during childhood. His parents kept him in ordinary school, and he later recalled practising only a few hours a day instead of spending his childhood wholly at the piano.

In 1957, at the age of twelve, Freire played Beethoven's Piano Concerto No. 5, the "Emperor", at the Rio de Janeiro International Piano Competition. Competing against older pianists, he reached the final round. His performance brought him a Brazilian government scholarship for study abroad. He chose Vienna to study with Bruno Seidlhofer, whose pupils included Friedrich Gulda.

Freire left for Vienna at fourteen. He travelled with Seidlhofer and, for the first time, lived outside Brazil without his parents. In Vienna he met Martha Argerich, who became a lifelong friend and musical partner.

== Career ==
=== Early international career ===
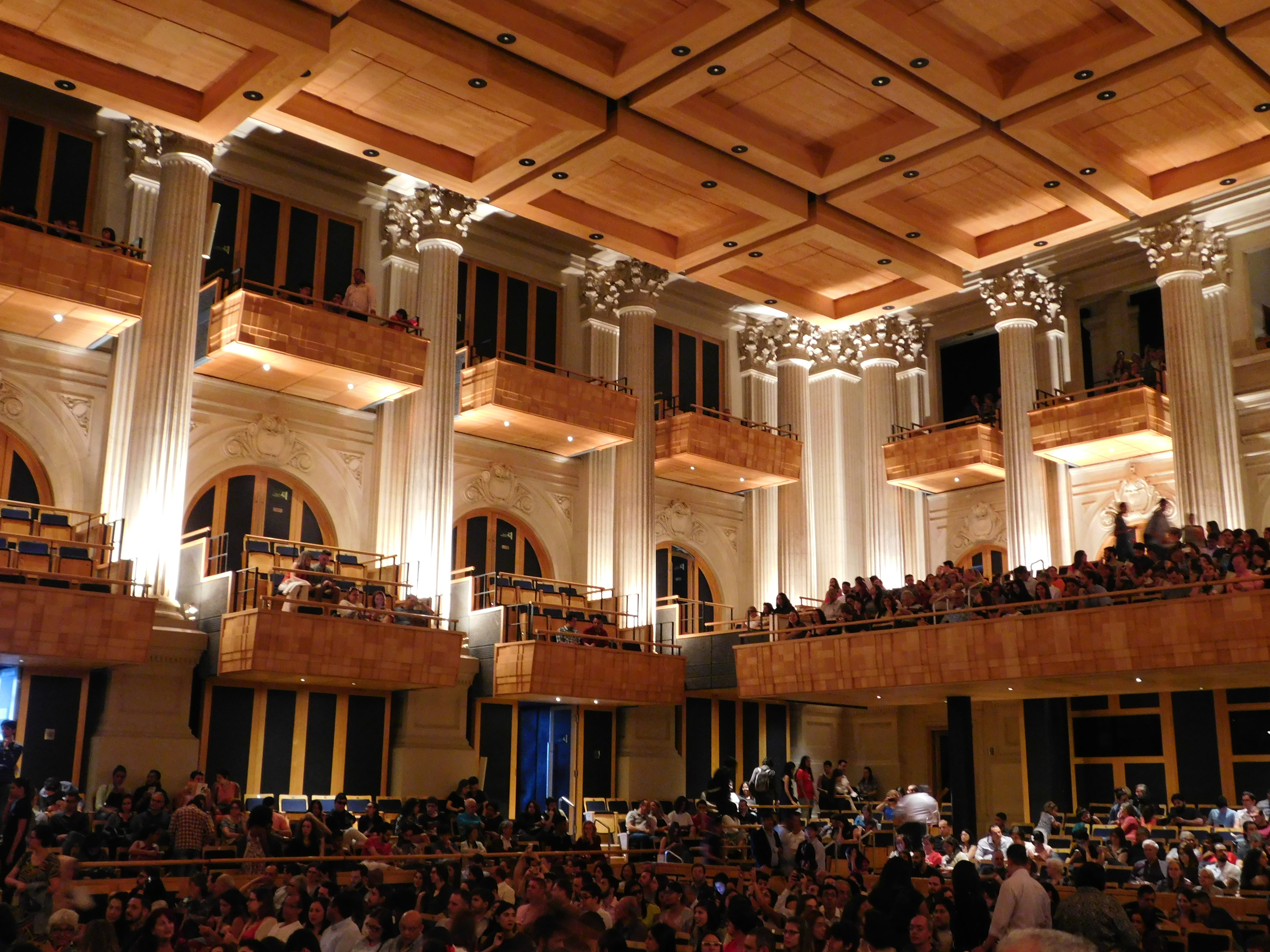
Sala São Paulo, where Freire appeared during Brazil's Chopin bicentenary commemorations

Freire began performing internationally in 1959 while still in his teens. His early engagements took him through Europe, the United States, Central and South America, Japan and Israel. In 1964 he shared first prize with Vladimir Krainev at the Vianna da Motta International Music Competition in Lisbon. He also received the Dinu Lipatti and Harriet Cohen medals in London.

The Lisbon prize opened a steady run of engagements abroad. Freire replaced Alexander Brailowsky in Mexico and gave his first concerts in Spain in 1965, playing in Valencia, Elche, Madrid and Las Palmas de Gran Canaria. He made his London debut at twenty-three and appeared with the New York Philharmonic in New York the following year. Concerto broadcasts and later reissues from those years include music by Beethoven, Schumann, Chopin, Grieg, Liszt, Tchaikovsky, Rachmaninoff and Prokofiev.

=== Orchestras, conductors and recital work ===
Freire spent the next decades moving between solo recitals, concertos and chamber music. In Europe he played with the Berlin Philharmonic, Gewandhaus Orchestra, Munich Philharmonic, Bavarian Radio Symphony Orchestra, Deutsches Symphonie-Orchester Berlin, Royal Concertgebouw Orchestra, Rotterdam Philharmonic Orchestra, Danish Radio Symphony Orchestra, St Petersburg Philharmonic Orchestra, Tonhalle-Orchester Zürich, Vienna Symphony, Royal Philharmonic Orchestra, London Symphony Orchestra, BBC Scottish Symphony Orchestra, BBC Symphony Orchestra, Czech Philharmonic, Orchestre National de France, Orchestre de Paris, Orchestre National du Capitole de Toulouse, Orchestre Philharmonique de Radio France and Orchestre de la Suisse Romande.

His appearances in the Americas included concerts with the Baltimore Symphony Orchestra, Boston Symphony Orchestra, Chicago Symphony Orchestra, Cleveland Orchestra, Los Angeles Philharmonic, Montreal Symphony Orchestra, New York Philharmonic and Philadelphia Orchestra. He also played with the Israel Philharmonic Orchestra, the Seoul Philharmonic Orchestra and the NHK Symphony Orchestra in Tokyo.

Among the conductors he worked with were Pierre Boulez, Riccardo Chailly, Myung-whun Chung, Colin Davis, Charles Dutoit, Valery Gergiev, Eugen Jochum, Rafael Kubelík, Rudolf Kempe, Fabio Luisi, Lorin Maazel, Kurt Masur, Ingo Metzmacher, Václav Neumann, Seiji Ozawa, André Previn, Yuri Temirkanov and David Zinman. Freire toured the United States and Germany with Kempe and the Royal Philharmonic Orchestra. He later spoke warmly of his work with Chailly, Gergiev and Temirkanov.

His recital programmes moved freely between Classical and Romantic works, French and Russian composers, and music from Brazil. A 1984 recital in Miami paired Mozart, Chopin and Debussy with Villa-Lobos, Albéniz, Godowsky and Rachmaninoff. For a seventy-fifth birthday recital at the Concertgebouw, he played Scarlatti, Godowsky, Handel, Brahms, Liszt and Grieg. Shorter pieces often sat beside large sonatas and other substantial works, and he frequently used miniatures as encores.

=== Festivals, competitions and public engagements ===
Freire first played at the BBC Proms in 2005, performing Chopin's Piano Concerto No. 2 with Ilan Volkov and the BBC Scottish Symphony Orchestra. He returned in 2012 with the São Paulo State Symphony Orchestra and Marin Alsop, playing Villa-Lobos's Momoprécoce. The following year, Freire joined the orchestra on a European tour through 13 cities in six countries, with concerts at the Salle Pleyel in Paris, the Royal Festival Hall in London and the Berliner Philharmonie.

In Brazil, Freire took part in events for the bicentenary of Chopin's birth. On 13 March 2010 he played at Sala São Paulo with the Filarmônica Brasileira under Cláudio Cruz in the opening concert of the Ano Chopin no Brasil. He also sat on the jury of the XVI International Chopin Piano Competition in Warsaw that year, when Yulianna Avdeeva won first prize.

Freire had already worked as a competition juror elsewhere. In 2001 he presided over the jury of the Concours international Marguerite Long-Jacques Thibaud in Paris. He was due to serve on the jury of the XVIII International Chopin Piano Competition in 2021, but illness forced him to withdraw. Arthur Moreira Lima replaced him.

In 2011 Freire cancelled a planned appearance with the Brazilian Symphony Orchestra and Roberto Minczuk in support of musicians who had been dismissed from the orchestra.

=== Collaboration with Martha Argerich ===
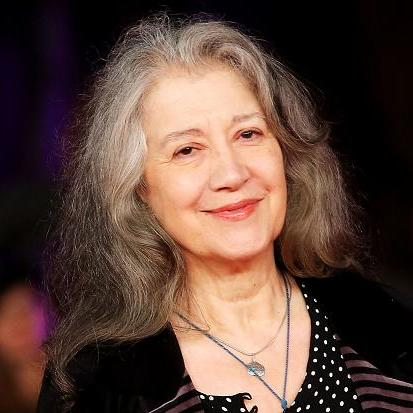
Martha Argerich, Freire's longtime friend and piano-duo partner

Freire met Martha Argerich in Vienna when they were young pianists. Their friendship lasted for the rest of his life and developed into his longest piano-duo partnership. They played together in London in 1968, and their duo concerts became more frequent from the 1980s.

A filmed 1982 programme placed solo music beside two-piano works by Ravel and Rachmaninoff. In 2000 Freire joined Argerich at Carnegie Hall, playing Ravel with her in a programme that also paired Argerich with the Juilliard String Quartet.

They toured Japan in 2003, Brazil and Argentina in 2004, and North America in 2005. Their repertory for two pianos included Rachmaninoff's Suite No. 2, Brahms's Variations on a Theme by Haydn, Ravel's La valse and Lutosławski's Variations on a Theme by Paganini. Deutsche Grammophon released a live recording from the Salzburg Festival. Nicholas Kenyon, reviewing the album in The Observer, praised the balance and responsiveness between the two pianists.

When Freire withdrew from the 2021 Chopin Competition jury because of illness, Argerich also withdrew. She travelled to Brazil during his final illness.

=== Later career ===
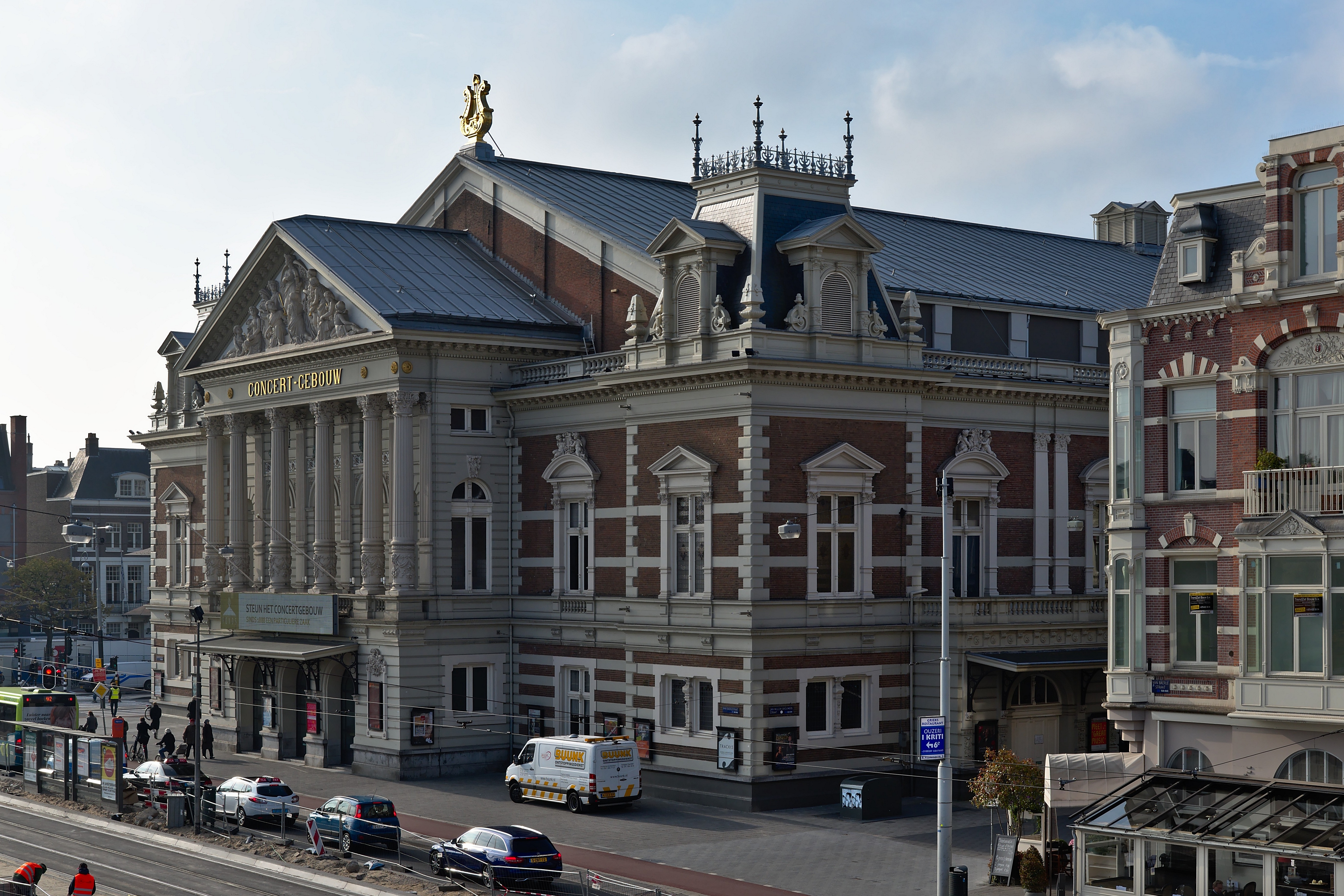
The Concertgebouw in Amsterdam, where Freire gave recitals during the later part of his career

Freire continued performing and recording through his seventies. Decca issued a succession of new albums during the 2000s and 2010s, bringing much of the repertory he had played for decades into new studio recordings. In 2016 the Federal University of Minas Gerais awarded him an honorary doctorate during the university's ninetieth-anniversary commemorations. He received the Lifetime Achievement Award from the International Classical Music Awards and the Konex Mercosur Prize in 2019.

At Carnegie Hall in 2018, Freire appeared with the Grand Rapids Symphony under Marcelo Lehninger, playing Villa-Lobos's Momoprécoce and de Falla's Nights in the Gardens of Spain. A fall in Rio de Janeiro in 2019 fractured his right humerus and forced him to cancel performances. He planned to return to the stage in 2020, but the COVID-19 pandemic delayed those plans.

== Recordings ==
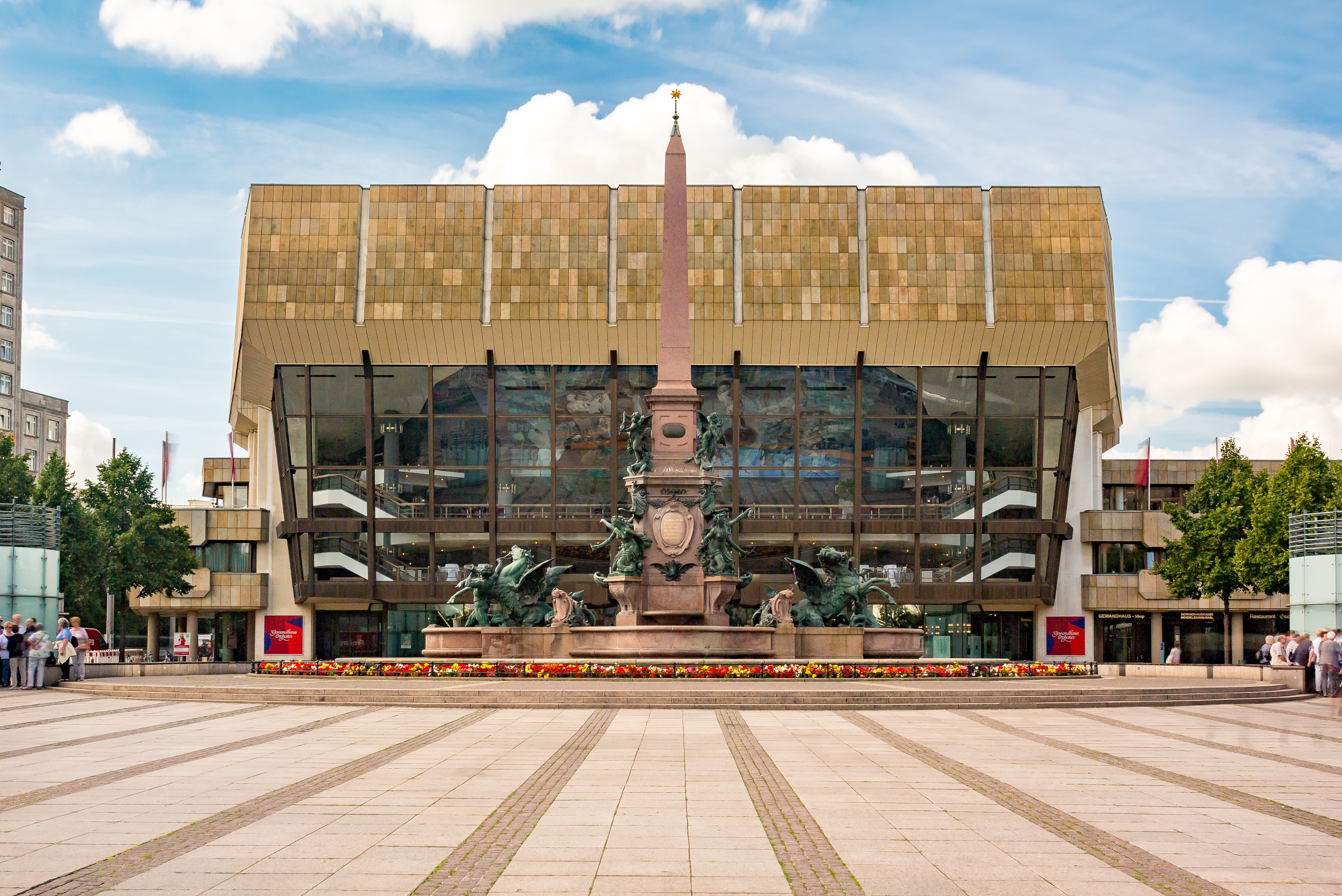
The Gewandhaus in Leipzig. Freire recorded Brahms's piano concertos with the Gewandhaus Orchestra and Riccardo Chailly.

Freire recorded less frequently than many pianists with comparable concert careers and often said he preferred the immediacy of playing before an audience. His commercial discography nevertheless spans CBS/Columbia, Sony Classical, Teldec, Philips, Decca, Deutsche Grammophon, Berlin Classics, IPAM and London. Chopin, Schumann, Brahms, Beethoven, Debussy and Liszt make up much of the recorded repertory, alongside Brazilian music, Bach and collections of shorter pieces.

His early CBS/Columbia recordings included concertos and solo works that returned decades later in digital reissues. Sony Classical collected much of this material in Nelson Freire: The Complete Columbia Album Collection in 2014. The set includes concertos by Tchaikovsky, Grieg and Schumann and Liszt's Totentanz, recorded with the Munich Philharmonic under Rudolf Kempe, as well as solo music by Schumann, Schubert, Brahms, Chopin and Liszt. His CBS recording of Chopin's 24 Préludes received the Prix Edison.

Freire also recorded Chopin for Teldec and Telefunken. Warner Classics later gathered these early performances as Nelson Freire Plays Chopin, including nocturnes, scherzos and other works. The Teldec album Chopin: Nocturnes & Fantasie paired ten nocturnes with the Fantaisie in F minor, Op. 49. Other Warner and Apex reissues included the four scherzos, the Heroic Polonaise, the Third Ballade and the Berceuse.

Philips included Freire in its Great Pianists of the 20th Century series in 1999. His recordings from this period also circulated on IPAM and London, alongside earlier studio and archival material.

In October 2001, Freire signed an exclusive contract with Decca. His first releases for the label began a sustained return to studio recording. A 2002 Chopin album paired the Piano Sonata No. 3 with the twelve études of Op. 25 and the Trois nouvelles études. It received the Diapason d'Or, the Grand Prix de l'Académie Charles Cros and a Choc from Le Monde de la musique. His next Decca Chopin album, released in 2005, included the twelve études of Op. 10, the Barcarolle and the Piano Sonata No. 2. It received a Grammy nomination.

His 2003 Schumann recital contained Carnaval, Papillons, Kinderszenen and Arabeske. Later Decca releases included Beethoven sonatas such as the "Moonlight", "Waldstein", "Les Adieux" and Op. 110, followed by a Debussy album with the first book of preludes, Children's Corner, Clair de lune and La plus que lente.

Freire recorded the two Brahms piano concertos with the Gewandhaus Orchestra and Riccardo Chailly in an album released by Decca in 2006. The recording won the 2007 Classic FM Gramophone Record of the Year award and the concerto category, and received a Grammy nomination. Freire returned to Brahms in 2017 for a solo album containing the Piano Sonata No. 3 and piano pieces from Opp. 39, 76 and 116-119.

For Chopin's bicentenary in 2010, Decca released Freire's recording of the complete nocturnes. Chopin: The Nocturnes received the Diapason d'Or and another Grammy nomination. A later album paired the Piano Concerto No. 2 with the Fourth Ballade, Berceuse, Heroic Polonaise and three mazurkas. Freire played the concerto with the Gürzenich Orchestra Cologne under Lionel Bringuier.

In 2011, the bicentenary of Liszt's birth, Freire released Harmonies du soir. The album contains the second and eighth Hungarian Rhapsodies, the title étude from the Transcendental Études, Waldesrauschen and the six Consolations. He had also recorded Liszt's piano concertos and Totentanz with the Dresden Philharmonic and Michel Plasson for Berlin Classics. Some of this material was later reissued alongside recordings by Artur Pizarro.

Freire's recordings with Martha Argerich appeared on more than one label. A Decca album paired them in Rachmaninoff's Suite No. 2, Ravel's La valse and Lutosławski's Variations on a Theme by Paganini. Deutsche Grammophon released their Salzburg Festival performance of music by Brahms, Rachmaninoff, Ravel and Schubert. Freire also joined Argerich, Peter Sadlo and Edgar Guggeis in a Deutsche Grammophon recording of Bartók's Sonata for Two Pianos and Percussion and arrangements of Ravel.

Brazilian music had its own place in Freire's discography. Brasileiro: Villa-Lobos and Friends, released by Decca in 2012, pairs piano works by Heitor Villa-Lobos with music by other Brazilian composers. The album won the 2013 Latin Grammy Award for Best Classical Album. Andrew Clements wrote in The Guardian that the thirty short pieces included sixteen by Villa-Lobos and that some belonged to repertory Freire had known since his student years in Brazil.

A 2014 Beethoven album paired the "Emperor" Concerto with the Piano Sonata No. 32, again with Chailly and the Gewandhaus Orchestra. In 2016 Freire made his first Bach album, playing the Partita No. 4 in D major, BWV 828, the English Suite No. 3 in G minor, BWV 808, the Chromatic Fantasia and Fugue, and transcriptions by Busoni, Siloti and Myra Hess. Encores, released on his seventy-fifth birthday in 2019, gathered shorter pieces by Sgambati, Purcell, Scarlatti, Paderewski, Godowsky, Grieg, Rubinstein, Rachmaninoff, Scriabin, Shostakovich and Granados.

Broadcast recordings filled gaps left by the studio catalogue. Decca's 2014 set Radio Days: The Concerto Broadcasts, 1968-1979 collected performances of concertos by Tchaikovsky, Rachmaninoff, Prokofiev, Chopin, Liszt and Schumann. After Freire's death, Decca released Memories in 2022, drawing on unreleased and broadcast performances of music by Gluck, Bach, Beethoven, Richard Strauss, Debussy, Villa-Lobos, Bartók and Brahms. The recordings include the Frankfurt Radio Symphony and the Radio-Sinfonieorchester Stuttgart under Michael Gielen, Horst Stein and Uri Segal.

== Film, interviews and biographies ==
João Moreira Salles directed the documentary Nelson Freire, released in 2003. Filmed in concert halls, backstage, during travel and at home, it follows Freire from memories of his first encounters with the piano to scenes with admirers after performances. Performances and rehearsals carry much of the film, while Martha Argerich provides its principal personal testimony.

Salles and his crew filmed Freire in Rio de Janeiro, São Paulo, France, Belgium and Russia between May 2000 and August 2001. João Moreira Salles, Felipe Lacerda and Flávio Pinheiro wrote the screenplay. Toca Seabra was the cinematographer, and Lacerda and Salles edited the film. It screened at the International Documentary Film Festival Amsterdam and at the San Francisco International Film Festival in 2005. In 2003 it won Best Documentary at the Festival Internacional del Nuevo Cine Latinoamericano. The following year it won Best Documentary and Best Sound at the Grande Prêmio do Cinema Brasileiro.

Freire also left filmed performances with Argerich. A 1982 concert preserved by medici.tv shows the two pianists in music by Debussy, Chopin, Ravel and Rachmaninoff. Freire plays Debussy's Estampes, Chopin's Trois nouvelles études and the Scherzo in B-flat minor before joining Argerich for Ravel's two-piano version of La valse and Rachmaninoff's Suite No. 2. During the 2010 International Chopin Piano Competition, Freire spoke about Argerich, their first public appearance together in London in 1968 and the music they played as a duo.

Freire rarely gave long interviews, but a few contain detailed recollections of his childhood and career. In an interview with Stany Kol, first published in The UNESCO Courier in September 1995, he recalled Boa Esperança, the move to Rio de Janeiro, his studies with Nise Obino, the 1957 Rio competition, Vienna and his first years abroad. In 2019, shortly before receiving the Lifetime Achievement Award from the International Classical Music Awards, he spoke at length about his training, repertory, recordings, friendship with Argerich and his feelings about recognition late in his career.

French writer and music journalist Olivier Bellamy published Nelson Freire: le secret du piano in 2022. Julia da Rosa Simões translated the book into Portuguese, and DBA published it in Brazil as Nelson Freire: O segredo do piano in 2024, the year Freire would have turned eighty. Bellamy used interviews, personal archives and conversations with people who knew Freire to write about his career, friendships, repertory and private temperament.

== Personal life and death ==
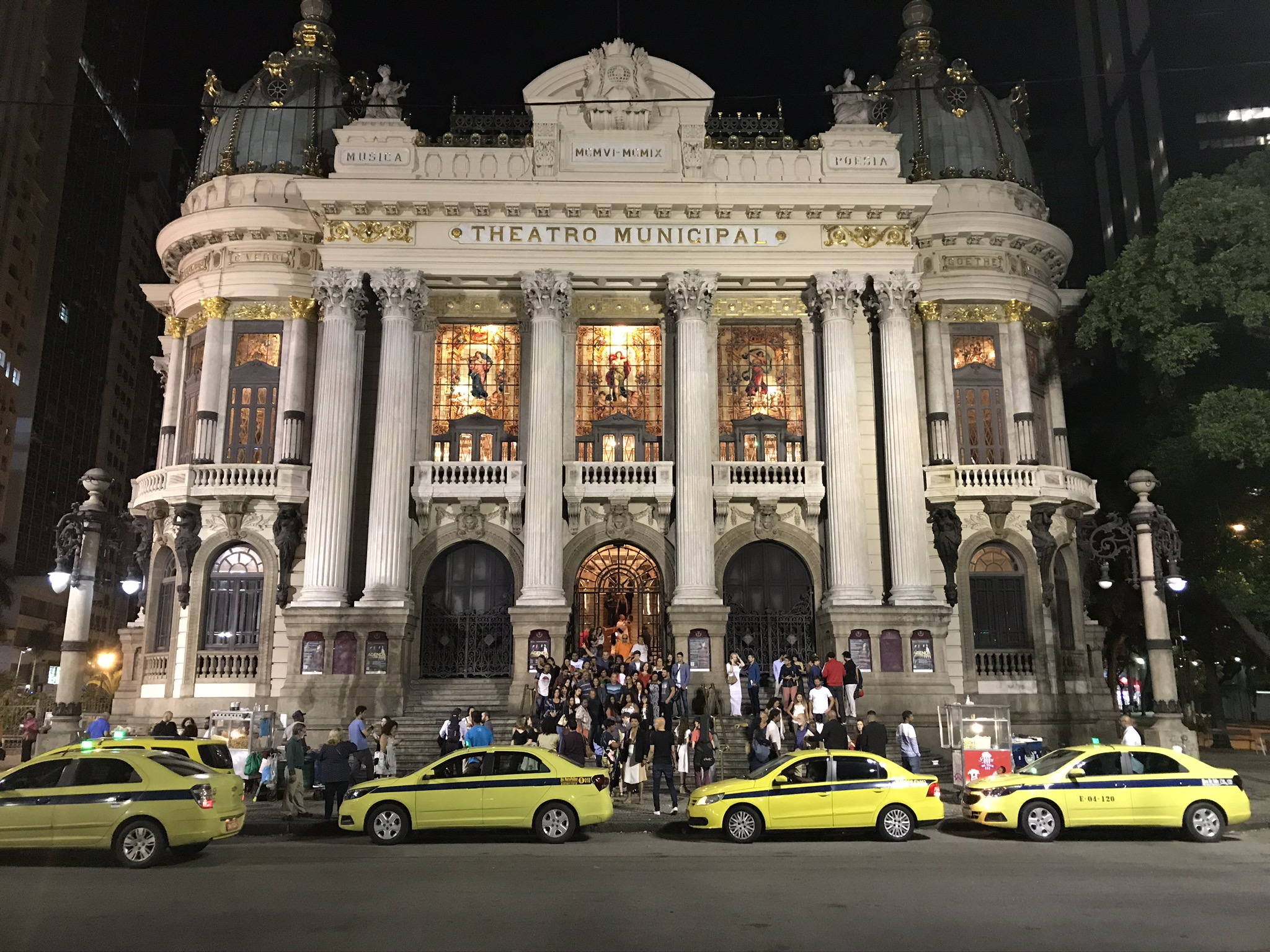
The Theatro Municipal do Rio de Janeiro, where Freire's body was laid out for public farewell

Freire kept much of his private life away from publicity and gave few interviews. He was married to physician Miguel Rosário.

In October 2019 Freire fell while walking along the beachfront in Barra da Tijuca, Rio de Janeiro, and fractured the humerus of his right arm. He underwent surgery and cancelled recitals and concerto appearances in Brazil and abroad, including concerts planned around his seventy-fifth birthday and sixtieth year as a performer. He planned to return to the stage in 2020, but the COVID-19 pandemic delayed his return.

Freire died at his home in Rio de Janeiro on 1 November 2021, aged 77. His body was laid out at the Theatro Municipal do Rio de Janeiro on 2 November. He was buried the next day in the municipal cemetery of Boa Esperança, where his parents were also buried.

== Tributes and commemoration ==
After Freire's death, orchestras, concert halls, musicians and cultural institutions in Brazil and abroad paid tribute to him. In Brazil these included the Fundação Osesp, the Minas Gerais Philharmonic Orchestra, the Sala Cecília Meireles, the Theatro Municipal do Rio de Janeiro, the Theatro Municipal de São Paulo and the Brazilian Symphony Orchestra. Obituaries often remarked on the contrast between the attention his playing received and his reserved manner away from the piano.

Boa Esperança had begun honouring Freire while he was still a child. Rua Nelson Freire, in the city centre, was named for him during his lifetime, and a plaque marks the site of the family pharmacy where he was born. The city also named the Deck Mirante Nelson Freire after him.

Decca released the posthumous album Memories in 2022, drawing on unreleased recordings and broadcasts. That year, the Festival International de Piano de La Roque d'Anthéron presented Amigos de Nelson Freire, with Brazilian pianists Cristian Budu, Eduardo Monteiro, Pablo Rossi, Fabio Martino, Clélia Iruzun and Juliana Steinbach. The festival also held a discussion about Freire with Alain Lompech and Olivier Bellamy. In 2024, when Freire would have turned eighty, Juliana Steinbach gave a tribute concert in Paris.

Bellamy's biography Nelson Freire: le secret du piano appeared in France in 2022. Its Portuguese translation, Nelson Freire: O segredo do piano, was published in Brazil by DBA in 2024.

== Awards and honours ==
=== Competitions and institutional honours ===
- 1964: First prize at the Vianna da Motta International Music Competition in Lisbon, shared with Vladimir Krainev.
- 1964: Dinu Lipatti Medal in London.
- 1964: Harriet Cohen Medal in London.
- 2002: Soloist of the Year, Victoires de la Musique Classique.
- 2005: Special honorary award for his career, Victoires de la Musique Classique.
- 2016: Doctor honoris causa from the Federal University of Minas Gerais.
- 2019: Lifetime Achievement Award from the International Classical Music Awards.
- 2019: Konex Mercosur Prize.

=== Decorations ===
- Commandeur of the Ordre des Arts et des Lettres (2007)
- Chevalier of the Legion of Honour (2011)

=== Recording awards and distinctions ===
- Prix Edison for his CBS recording of Chopin's 24 Préludes.
- 2002: Diapason d'Or for his Decca Chopin recording.
- 2002: Grand Prix de l'Académie Charles Cros for his Decca Chopin recording.
- 2002: Choc from Le Monde de la musique for his Decca Chopin recording.
- 2002: Répertoire rating of 10 for his Decca Chopin recording.
- 2002: Recommended by Classica for his Decca Chopin recording.
- 2007: Classic FM Gramophone Award, Record of the Year, for Brahms's piano concertos with the Gewandhaus Orchestra and Riccardo Chailly.
- 2007: Classic FM Gramophone Award, Concerto category, for Brahms's piano concertos with the Gewandhaus Orchestra and Chailly.
- 2010: Diapason d'Or for Chopin: The Nocturnes.
- 2010: Quarterly Critics' Choice, Preis der deutschen Schallplattenkritik, for Martha Argerich and Nelson Freire: Live from Salzburg.
- 2011: Quarterly Critics' Choice, Preis der deutschen Schallplattenkritik, for Liszt: Harmonies du soir.
- 2013: Latin Grammy Award for Best Classical Album for Brasileiro: Villa-Lobos and Friends.
- 2016: ECHO Klassik award, Solo Recording, music up to and including the 17th/18th century, for Bach.

=== Grammy Award nominations ===
- 2006: Grammy Award nomination, Best Instrumental Soloist Performance without Orchestra, for Chopin's études, Barcarolle and Piano Sonata No. 2.
- 2007: Grammy Award nomination, Best Instrumental Soloist Performance with Orchestra, for Brahms's piano concertos with the Gewandhaus Orchestra and Chailly.
- 2010: Grammy Award nomination, Best Instrumental Soloist Performance without Orchestra, for Chopin: The Nocturnes.

== See also ==
- Great Pianists of the 20th Century, Philips recording series that included Freire
- Guiomar Novaes, Brazilian classical pianist of an earlier generation
- Magda Tagliaferro, Brazilian classical pianist
- Jacques Klein, Brazilian classical pianist
- João Carlos Martins, Brazilian classical pianist and conductor
- Arthur Moreira Lima, Brazilian classical pianist and contemporary of Freire
- Arnaldo Cohen, Brazilian classical pianist
- Cristina Ortiz, Brazilian classical pianist
