= Jacques Klein =

Brazilian composer and pianist

Jacques Klein (10 July 1930 – 24 October 1982) was a Brazilian composer and pianist.

Born to a Jewish family in Aracati, he grew up in the nearby city of Fortaleza, where he began to study piano at the Conservatorio Alberto Nepomuceno, which was founded by his father. At the beginning of the 1940s he moved to Rio de Janeiro, where he studied with Liddy Mignone at the Conservatorio Brasileiro de Musica, where he himself began to teach in the 1950s. At the age of thirteen he temporarily left classical music and set up a jazz trio with his friends Dinarte Rodrigues (on guitar) and Breno Porto (on drums). The trio began to perform once a week on Radio Jornal do Brasil, starting in 1946. In 1948 Klein returned to classical music and studied with William Kapell in New York City and with Bruno Seidlhofer in Vienna. In 1953 he won first prize at the Geneva International Music Competition, which launched his international career. In 1954 Klein appeared with the London Philharmonic. In 1955 he was chosen as the best pianist of the year in London and received the Harriet Cohen Medal. He formed a duo with violinist Salvatore Accardo and performed with pianist Friedrich Gulda. He taught at the school of music at Federal University of Rio de Janeiro and at the University of Miami. He made a number of recordings of the Brazilian samba. His students include Egberto Gismonti, Clelia Iruzun, and Arnaldo Cohen.

The Latin American Music Center of Indiana University awards a Jacques Klein Prize for the best performance of a solo piano work by a Brazilian composer in his memory; the prize is worth $500.
