= Fernando Machado =

Fernando Machado may refer to:

- Fernando Machado (colonel) (1822-1868), Brazilian colonel
- Fernando Machado (footballer) (born 1979), Uruguayan footballer
- Fernando Machado Soares (1930-2013), Portuguese singer, poet, composer, jurist and judge

== See also ==
- Fernanda Machado (born 1980), Brazilian actress
- Luiz Fernando Machado (born 1977), Brazilian politician
