= Ana Paula Lisboa =

Afro-Brazilian writer, journalist and presenter

Ana Paula Lisboa is an Afro-Brazilian writer, journalist and presenter, who lives between Rio de Janeiro and Luanda in Angola. Her poetry and short stories have been published in national and international collections. In 2014 she received the first Carolina de Jesus Award. She is a columnist for the newspaper O Globo.

== Life ==
Ana Paula Lisboa was born in Rio de Janeiro in the late 1980s, the oldest of four children of black blue-collar workers. She started writing at the age of 14, and graduated from university in Portuguese Language and Literature.

In 2011 she joined the Network for Youth Agency (Agência de Redes Para Juventude). Starting as a territory mediator for the Rio de Janeiro favelas of Cidade de Deus and Borel, she subsequently worked as a methodology coordinator. Her writing on the favelas has been included in two collections translated into French.

In December 2014 she received the first Carolina de Jesus Prize, named after Carolina Maria de Jesus awarded to individuals who have changed their lives through literature.

Ana Paula Lisboa was with Marielle Franco at the meeting of the Casa das Pretas (House of Black Women), in the Lapa region of Lapa, Rio de Janeiro before Franco's murder in 2016. The death caused her to reevaluate her priorities, taking up yoga and the candomblé:

It is obvious to everyone that the murder of Marielle (Franco) triggered this wave of self-care, which meant that I stopped to listen to myself and take better care of myself.

Ana Paula Lisboa was a contributor to Jet Black Eyes (2017), a collection of Black Brazilian prose. In 2019 she participated in the 8th Outskirts Literary Festival (Festa Literária das Periferias, or FLUP), held at the Rio Art Museum. She was also involved in a book project – Carolinas: A New Generation of Black Writers – growing out of FLUP's 2020 writing workshops, which were inspired by the work of Carolina Maria de Jesus six decades earlier.

As part of the 95th anniversary celebrations of O Globo in 2020, she joined other journalists to debate political polarization and democracy with Rodrigo Maia and Luís Roberto Barroso.

== Works ==
- (with Veruska Delfino) Dicionário Agência. Brazil: Agência de Redes para Juventude, 2014.
- (with Mário Feijó, Joana Ribeiro and others) Je suis toujours favela. Paris: Anacaona, 2014. Translated by Paula Anacaona.
- (with Denise Homem, Fernando Molica and others) Je suis encore favela. Paris: Anacaona, 2018. Translated by Paula Anacaona.
