= Fabio Zanon =

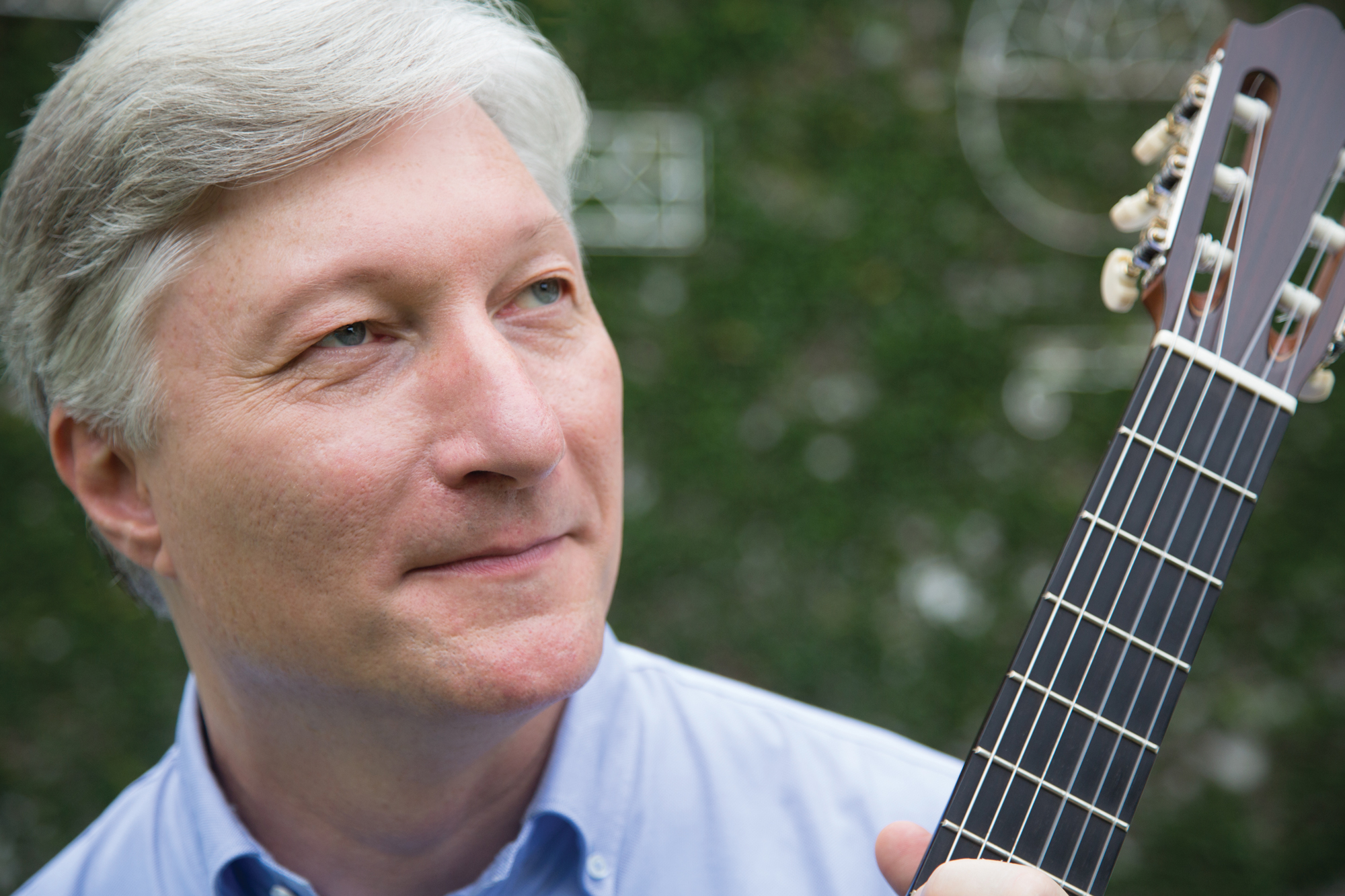
- Fabio Zanon in 2015

Background information
- Born: Fabio Pedroso Zanon; 6 March 1966; Jundiaí, São Paulo, Brazil
- Genre: Classical music
- Occupations: Musician
- Instruments: Guitar

Fabio Zanon is a Brazilian classical guitarist, conductor and teacher.

== Career ==
Born in Jundiaí in 1966, Zanon began his studies with his father and with guitar teacher Antonio Guedes. He graduated in music at the São Paulo University (USP), having studied with Edelton Gloeden and Henrique Pinto. In 1990, he continued his studies under Michel Lewin at the Royal Academy of Music in London, where he obtained his master's degree in music in 1993, having also participated in Julian Bream's masterclasses.

He won the 30th Francisco Tárrega Classical Guitar Competition in Spain and the 14th Guitar Foundation of America International Concert Artist Competition. He received the Moinho Santista Award in 1997, the Carlos Gomes Award in 2005, the Bravo! Award in 2010 and was also nominated for a Latin Grammy in 2011 with the album OSESP - Francis Hime (Concerto para violão e orquestra) e Nelson Ayres (Concertino para percussão e orquestra).

His debut with a major orchestra took place in March 1998, when he stepped in at short notice for a performance of Astor Piazzolla’s Guitar Concerto with the London Philharmonic. Since then, he has played with some of the world's major orchestras, and has offered masterclasses and lessons in over 40 countries.

He is a visiting professor at the Royal Academy of Music in London.

Since 2013 he is also the artistic-pedagogical coordinator of the Campos do Jordão International Winter Festival, where he has been teaching since 2005.

== Recordings ==
- Latin American Sonatas: Guastavino, Miranda, Ardévol, Ginastera, Fernandez, Fariñas EGTA, 1997
- Heitor Villa-Lobos: The Complete Solo Guitar Works. Music Masters, 1997.
- Guitar Recital: Tárrega, Bach, Faria, Mertz, Ponce. Naxos, 1998 (reedited in Italy: Seicorde, 2004).
- Les Enfants du Siècle. Soundtrack by Luís Bacalov. Decca, 2000.
- Tangos and Choros (with Marcelo Barboza, flute): Piazzolla, Gnatalli, Villa-Lobos, Pujol, Côrtes Meridian, 2002.
- Jan van der Roost Trumpet and Guitar Concertos. Phaedra Records, 2004.
- Domenico Scarlatti Sonatas. Musical Heritage, 2006.
- Francis Hime and Nelson Ayres - OSESP: Nelson Ayres, Francis Hime, Fabio Zanon, John Neschling. Biscoito Fino, 2010 (nominated for the Latin Grammy 2011).
- The Romantic Guitar: Schumann, Mendelssohn, Regondi, Bobrowicz, Coste, Liszt. Guitar Coop, 2015.
- Spanish Music: Albeniz, Granados, Malats. Guitar Coop, 2016.
- Americas. Guitar Coop, 2018.
- Treasures from the New World, Volume 3 (with Clélia Iruzun, piano and Marcelo Barboza, flute). SOMM Recordings, 2023.
