= Eugen Szenkar =

Hungarian-born German-Brazilian conductor (1891–1977)

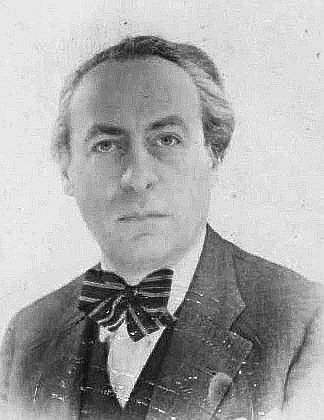
- Eugen Szenkar in 1939
- Born: Szenkár Jenő; 9 April 1891; Budapest, Austria-Hungary
- Died: 25 March 1977 (aged 85); Düsseldorf, West Germany
- Education: Franz Liszt Academy of Music
- Occupation: Conductor
- Organizations: Oper Frankfurt; Cologne Opera; Brazilian Symphony Orchestra

Eugen Szenkar (Hungarian: Szenkár Jenő; 9 April 1891 – 25 March 1977) was a Hungarian-born German-Brazilian conductor who made an international career in Austria, Germany, Russia, and Brazil. He promoted the stage works of Bela Bartók and other contemporary music at the Oper Frankfurt, the Cologne Opera, where he conducted the world premiere of The Miraculous Mandarin, and in Berlin. He conducted all of the symphonies by Gustav Mahler.

Szenkar escaped the Nazi regime in 1933 to Vienna, Paris, and Moscow, from where he was expelled in a Stalinist purge. He tried to build musical life in Rio de Janeiro from 1939 but returned to Germany after World War II. He remained faithful to his intentions for life, although he was often restricted as a Jew, a foreigner, a perceived leftist, and a non-conformist. As he preferred live performances to recording, few sound documents of his work are extant.

== Life ==
Szenkar was born in Budapest, the son of the conductor, organist and composer Nándor Szenkár. He appeared in public as a pianist and conductor from an early age. He was accepted into the composition class of Victor von Herzfeld at the Franz Liszt Academy of Music in Budapest in 1908, and also studied with Ernst von Dohnanyi and Hans Koessler in Vienna.

Szenkar took up his first position as a répétiteur at the Budapest Volksoper in 1911. In 1912, he got a contract for one year at the Deutsches Landestheater in Prague, first as a choir director, later as second Kapellmeister. In 1913, he returned to the Budapest Volksoper, which existed until 1915. After one season at the Stadttheater Salzburg and a short intermezzo at the Centraltheater Dresden, he became Kapellmeister at the ducal court theatre in Altenburg, Thuringia, in 1917, a position he held until 1920. There he conducted Wagner's Der Ring des Nibelungen and all symphonies by Gustav Mahler, then still a composer who was not generally accepted.

In 1920, Szenkar became first Kapellmeister, with Ludwig Rottenberg, at the Oper Frankfurt, where Paul Hindemith played principal viola. Szenkar conducted the world premiere of Wellesz' Die Prinzessin Girnara and the German premieres of Bartók's Herzog Blaubarts Burg and Der holzgeschnitzte Prinz. He met Bartók there and became a pioneer of his works in Germany.

From 1923 to 1924, Szenkar was Generalmusikdirektor (GMD) of the Volksoper in Berlin, where he conducted a highly acclaimed performance of Mussorgski's Boris Godunov in 1924. The same year, he succeeded Otto Klemperer at the Cologne Opera. There, he conducted, besides world premieres of contemporary operas (Braunfels, Wellesz), the European premiere of Prokofiev's The Love for Three Oranges, the German premiere of Kodály's Háry János as well as performances of Wagner's Ring cycle and five Mozart operas. He conducted the world premiere of Bartók's Der wunderbare Mandarin on 26 November 1926, but it caused a "near riot" at the premiere, and further performances were banned by the then-mayor, Konrad Adenauer. In the Gesellschaft für Neue Musik, he championed contemporary composers with numerous premieres. At opera house concerts, Szenkar performed Mahler's Das Lied von der Erde, his symphonies nos. 2, 3, 5, and 7, as well as Symphony No. 8 with 800 singers. He conducted Schönberg's Gurre-Lieder with almost 1000 performers. In 1928, the Cologne Opera gave guest performances at the Vienna State Opera with Mozart's Così fan tutte, Handel's Giulio Cesare and Debussy's Pelléas et Mélisande. The same year, a recording of Beethoven's Fifth Symphony was made for the 100th anniversary of his death. In 1928 and 1932, Szenkar gave guest concerts at the Teatro Colón in Buenos Aires.

In 1933, he fled the Nazi regime to Vienna. There he conducted Mahler's Symphony No. 3 with the Wiener Sängerknaben, the Wiener Singakademie and the Vienna Symphony Orchestra and a performance of Wagner's Der fliegende Holländer. In 1934, Szenkar accepted an invitation to Moscow, where he conducted the State Philharmonic Orchestra and was guest conductor at the Bolshoi Theatre. He also held a conductor class at the State Conservatory. His most famous student was Kirill Kondrashin. Szenkar was friends with Prokofiev and Nikolai Myaskovsky. He conducted the world premieres of Aram Khachaturian's First Symphony and Myaskovsky's 16th symphony. In 1937, he was expelled from Russia during the first great wave of Stalin's purge.

In 1938 and 1939, Szenkar lived in Paris where he conducted concerts with the Palestine Orchestra, founded by Bronisław Huberman. In 1939, he was invited as guest conductor at the Theatro Municipal of Rio de Janeiro. The beginning of World War II kept him in Brazil, where he and a few colleagues founded the Brazilian Symphony Orchestra in 1940, which he led until 1948. He built up musical life based on European models in Rio, gave up to 80 concerts a year, initiated Sunday matinees and youth concerts and founded a choir of amateur singers. During a guest performance in 1958, he was made an honorary citizen of the city.

At the end of 1949, Szenkar returned to Europe and lived in Paris. From 1950 to 1952, he was GMD in Mannheim and at the same time had an extensive guest contract with the Cologne Opera. From 1952 to 1956, he worked as opera manager at the Düsseldorf Opera under general manager Walter Bruno Iltz, and GMD of Düsseldorf. In 1954, he led the Düsseldorf Symphony Orchestra and the choir of the Musikverein on their first tour abroad. At a concert in the Royal Festival Hall in London, he conducted Bruckner's Seventh Symphony. In 1958, he conducted the world premiere of the Fifth Symphony by Wellesz. He was awarded honorary membership of the International Gustav Mahler Association. In 1960, he resigned as GMD due to his age. In the following years he was a traveling conductor in Europe, particularly to Hungary. His last conducting performance was Bizet's Carmen in Cologne on the occasion of his 80th birthday.

Szenkar married the opera singer Hermine Zeitschel. Their son was the music producer and composer Claudio Szenkar. Eugen Szenkar's brother Alexander was also a conductor. Szenkar died in Düsseldorf at the age of 85.

== Recording ==
Archiphon released a 3-CD set in 2005 that compiled Szenkar's 1928 recording of Beethoven's Fifth Symphony with his postwar recordings of Mahler's Third and Fourth symphonies. The Beethoven was recorded with the Staatskapelle Berlin. The Mahler Third was recorded in Cologne in 1951 with the Kölner Rundfunk-Sinfonie-Orchester and is possibly the second recording of the work. The Fourth was recorded in a live performance with the Symphonieorchester der Stadt Düsseldorf.
