= Eduardo Monteiro =

Brazilian concert pianist (born 1966)

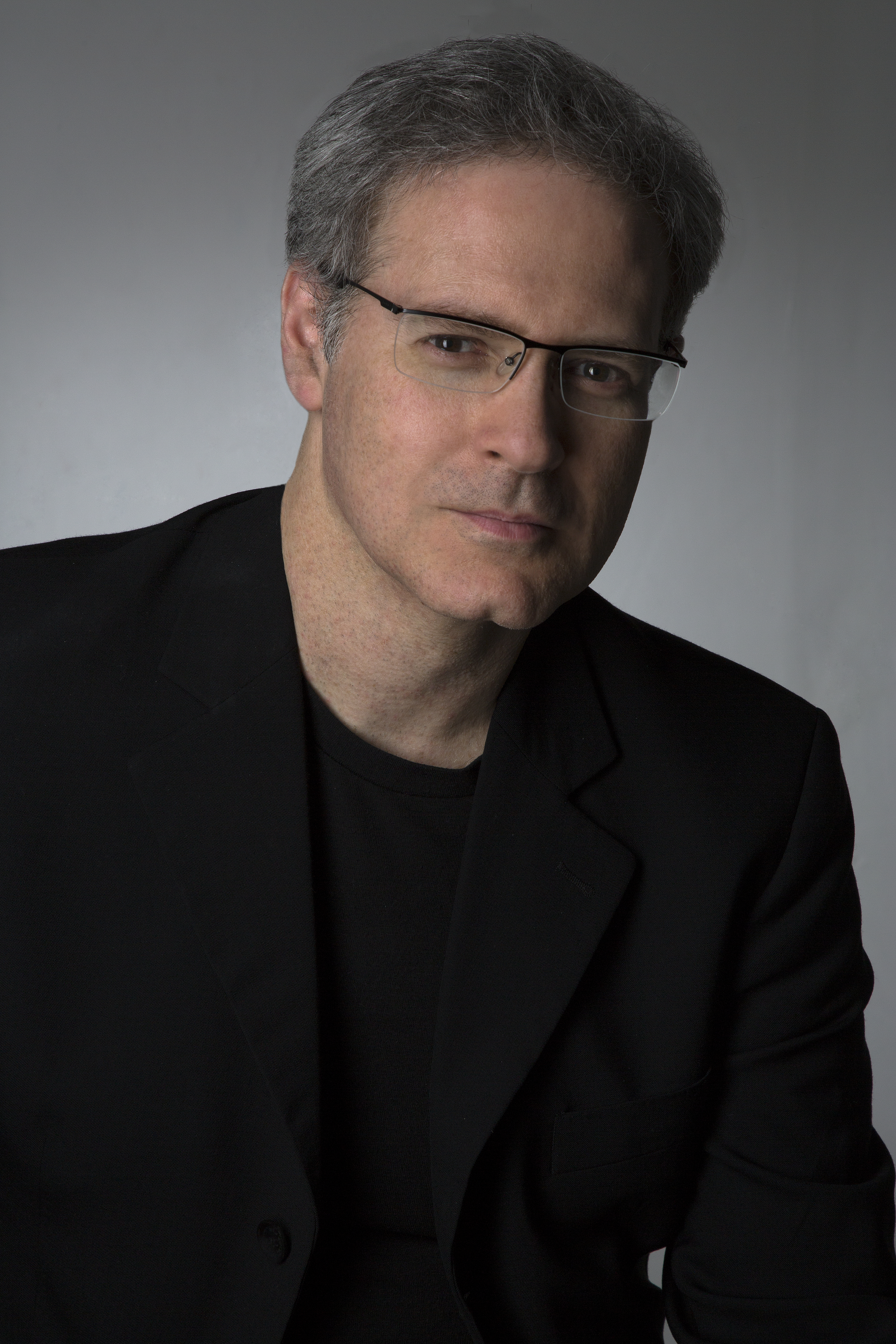
- Eduardo Monteiro
- Born: 1966 (age 59–60); Rio de Janeiro, Brazil
- Education: Federal University of Rio de Janeiro; Sorbonne University; International Piano Academy Lake Como; New England Conservatory
- Musical career
- Website: Official website

Eduardo Henrique Soares Monteiro (born 1966 in Rio de Janeiro) is a Brazilian concert pianist, university professor and piano teacher.

== Musical education ==
Graduating with a BA and an MA from the Federal University of Rio de Janeiro, he earned a doctorate at the Sorbonne in 2000 on the subject of the chamber music of Brazilian composer Henrique Oswald. Initial piano teachers included Esther Naiberger and Myrian Dauelsberg, and he received many prizes in Brazil. He continued his studies at the International Piano Academy Lake Como and finally at the New England Conservatory of Music in Boston, with Wha-Kyung Byun.

== Prizes ==
Monteiro gained European recognition at the Cologne International Piano Competition in 1989, winning first prize and the prize for a performance of a Beethoven piano concerto. He was a prize-winner at the International Piano Competition in Dublin (1991) and at the Paloma O'Shea International Piano Competition in Santander (1992).

Eduardo Monteiro was awarded the Carlos Gomes prize in 2004 and the pianist prize for the year 2005.

== International career ==
Solo recitals include Wigmore Hall (London) in 2003 and 2008, the Great Hall of the Moscow Conservatory in 2007, Rome (2011) and Charleston (SC) USA 2015.

Eduardo Monteiro has performed with the St. Petersburg Philharmonic Orchestra (Termikanov), Munich Philharmonic (Fisch)(Gasteig, 6 July 1997), National Symphony Orchestra of Ireland (Bakels)(NCH, 13 December 1991), the Novosibirsk Symphony Orchestra (Katz). He has also performed with the Minas Gerais Philharmonic Orchestra (Tibiriçá) and other principal orchestras of Brazil.

== Proponent of Brazilian music ==
Monteiro is a proponent of the music of Brazil. His recording Piano Music of Brazil with Meridian Records (2008) was well received and included in International Piano’s selection for an evening of Brazilian piano music; he has recorded Henrique Oswald’s chamber music (including the Piano Quartet No. 2, Op. 26 and the Piano Quintet, Op. 18) with the São Paulo Ensemble on the LAMI label.

Monteiro is a notable performer of the music of the composer Almeida Prado, who dedicated his Ballade no 4 to him. Monteiro’s recording of Cartas Celestes Volume 1 by Prado was broadcast on Brazilian radio in homage to the composer on his death in 2010.

== Educational activity ==
He is currently vice-director of the School of Communications and Arts at the University of São Paulo and publishes widely on his subject. His pupils include Christian Budu who won first prize at the 2013 Clara Haskil International Piano Competition.

Monteiro contributed the classical piano section on the DVD Piano – A History of 300 Years and was producer and presenter of a 13-part series The Language of the Piano in the Classical Period for Brazilian radio in 2013.
