= Antônio de Queirós Teles, Baron of Jundiaí =

Brazilian politician

Antônio de Queirós Teles

Personal details
- Born: 1 February 1789 Jundiaí, Brazil
- Died: 11 October 1870 (aged 81) Campinas, Brazil

Antônio de Queirós Teles (1 February 1789 – 11 October 1870) was a Brazilian politician.

A Baron of Jundiaí of a noble family, he was a delegate of the Provincial Assembly of Brazil.
