= Nándor Szenkár =

Nándor Szenkár (1857 – 12 August 1927) was a Hungarian composer, conductor and organist.

He was born in Kamianets-Podilskyi, Russian Empire in 1857. As a student of the Franz Liszt Academy of Music in Budapest, he won the Liszt Ferenc Prize. For many years he was the conductor of Rumbach Street Synagogue in Pest. His compositions include two operas, a ballet, several chamber compositions and numerous church compositions. His compositions were performed several times by the Philharmonic Orchestra, and at the Opera House in Budapest.

Szenkár was married to Róza Rottenstein. Their three sons Dezső, Jenő and Mihály became well-known composers and conductors, and their daughter Sarolta was a pianist.
