= Piano Quintet (Oswald) =

The Piano Quintet in C major, Op. 18, by Henrique Oswald was finished in 1895. Like most of the piano quintets after the Schumann's, it is scored for piano, 2 violins, viola and cello. A typical performance takes 27–31 minutes.

== History ==
The quintet was composed by Oswald during the last decade of his Italian period. He had already composed the Piano Quartet No. 1, Op. 5 (1888), the Piano Trio in G minor, Op. 9 (1889) and two string quartets, thus proving to be a confident composer of chamber music. However, none of these compositions were printed during his lifetime.

The quintet is dedicated to Signora Karl Hillebrand, that is, Jessie Laussot, widow of Karl Hillebrand, a friend of Hans von Bülow, Richard Wagner and Franz Liszt. A relevant person in Florence music life since 1850s, she was the teacher of Giuseppe Buonamici, who became a crucial figure in Oswald's musical formation.

Like his previous chamber compositions, Oswald never published the quintet, although he included it in most of his performance programs.

== Music ==
The quintet is in four traditional movements:

1. Allegro moderato (C major)
2. Scherzo. Prestissimo (A major)
3. Molto adagio (A minor)
4. Molto allegro (C major)

The quintet is notable for its texture balance and transparency. It is a relatively simple work, the realisation, inspiration and communicability qualities of which can be appreciated from the first listening.

Oswald's affiliation with the German school is apparent, with echoes of Schumann and Mendelssohn, especially in the first and last movement respectively. On the other hand, the harmonies of the first movement's development section already show the composer approaching the style of Fauré and the French school, an inclination that will become more clear in his future works.

The main motive of the first movement sounds like a secular song. Nothing hinters the principal voice, reminding of Schubert's compositions.

The second movement, a scherzo, is very typical of Oswald (he is on his best with this genre). It originates back to the Piano Quartet No. 1 (1888), from which it was excluded and adapted for this quintet. The rapid piano scales give a sense of great vivacity. The trio opposes the piano to the sonority of the strings.

The third movement is a piece of extreme romanticism, quite uncommon in Oswald's output. Its inspired lines and expressive density makes it the emotional center of the whole quintet.

The finale reminds of Mendelssohn, in the way of being a quasi uninterrupted movement throughout. A rousingly fast tempo requires piano virtuosity, while the strings complete and interrupt each other's phrases in the most amicable manner.

== Editions ==
Like most of Oswald's major compositions, the quintet remained unpublished at the time of his death. Only an arrangement for piano solo of the third movement (Molto adagio) made by Oswald's pupil João Octaviano Gonçalves was published in Rio de Janeiro ca. 1926 (Sampaio Araujo & C., plate 7905).

The first edition of the complete quintet was prepared by Luiz Heitor Corrêa de Azevedo and published in 1937 by Escola Nacional de Musica da Universidade do Brasil. A new edition was printed recently by Criadores do Brasil Publishing, São Paulo Symphony Orchestra’s publishing branch. In 2016 a critical edition was prepared by Eduardo Monteiro, it is available online.

== Recordings ==
- (1964) Henrique Oswald: Quinteto em Dó Maior opus 18; Oscar Lorenzo Fernández: Trio Brasileiro opus 32 – Conjunto de Música de Câmara de São Paulo: Fritz Jank (piano), Gino Alfonsi (violin I), Alexandre Schauffmann (violin II), Johannes Oelsner (viola), Calixto Corazza (cello) – Chantecler Internacional CMG 1024 (LP)
  - (2003?) Reissued on CD: Grandes pianistas brasileiros, Vol. 11: Fritz Jank (includes also Paulistanas by Cláudio Santoro) – MCD World Music MC 022 (CD)
- (1984) Henrique Oswald: Música de câmara Vol. 1: Quinteto para piano e cordas op. 18, Quarteto para cordas op. 46 – Elias Slon (violin I), Jorge Salim (violin II), Michel Verebes (viola), Kim Cook (cello), José Eduardo Martins (piano) – BASF 004 (LP)
- (1999) Brasil 500: Henrique Oswald [Quinteto op. 18]; Luís de Freitas Branco [Quarteto] – Luiz de Moura Castro (piano), Quarteto de Brasília: Ludmila Vinecka (violin I), Claudio Cohen, (violin II), Glesse Collet (viola), Guerra Vicente (cello) – no label (CD)
- (2010/2011) Henrique Oswald: Música de câmara (Integral dos quartetos de cordas; Integral dos quartetos com piano; Quinteto com piano Op. 18; Trio com piano Op. 45; Sonata-Fantasia Op. 44; Elegia para cello e piano) – ArsBrasil (violin: Artur Roberto Huf, Samuel Lima; viola: André Rodrigues, Valdeci Merquiori; cello: Gêneses Oliveira, Mauro Brucoli, Renato Oliveira), Fernando Lopes (piano) – Ariah Cultural (3 CDs)
- (2013) Henrique Oswald: Música de câmara (Quinteto para piano e cordas, op. 18; Quarteto para piano e cordas, op. 26; Piccolo trio para violino, violoncelo e piano; Elegia para violoncelo e piano; Canto elegíaco para violino e piano) – Eduardo Monteiro (piano), Betina Stegmann (violin), Nelson Rios (violin), Marcelo Jaffé (viola), Robert Suetholz (cello) – LAMI 012 (CD)
- (2014) Henrique Oswald: Quarteto com piano, op. 26; Quinteto com piano, op. 18 – Ricardo Castro (piano), Quarteto OSESP: Emmanuele Baldini (violin), Davi Graton (violin), Peter Pas (viola, Quarteto), Cláudio Cruz (viola, Quinteto), Johannes Gramsch (cello) – OSESP Selo Digital 6 (digital release)
- (2019) Treasures from the New World: Piano Quintets by Amy Beach & Henrique Oswald – Clelia Iruzun, Coull Quartet – SOMM recordings SOMMCD 0609 (CD)
