= Jundiaí =

- Municipality
- Municipality of Jundiaí
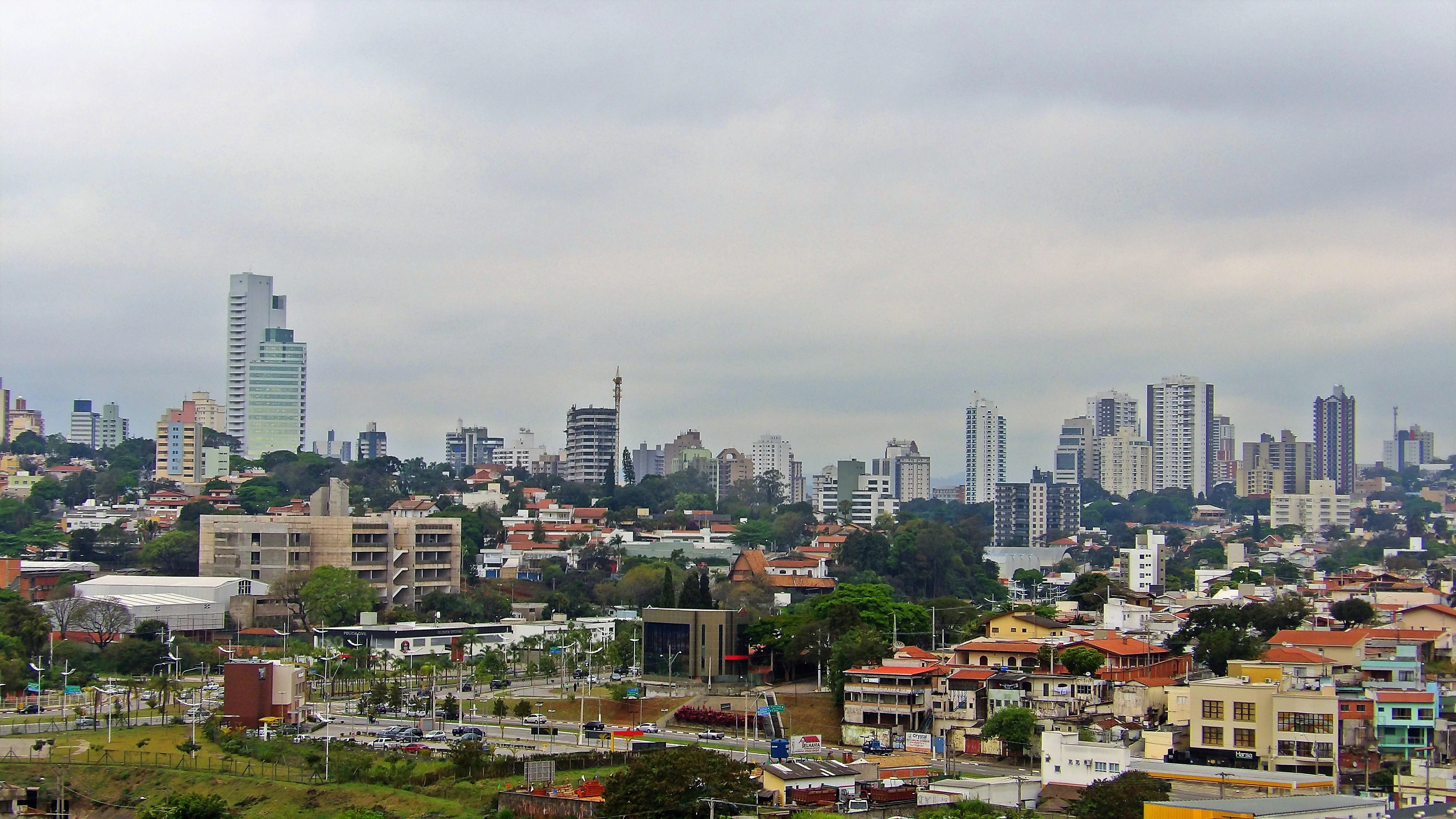
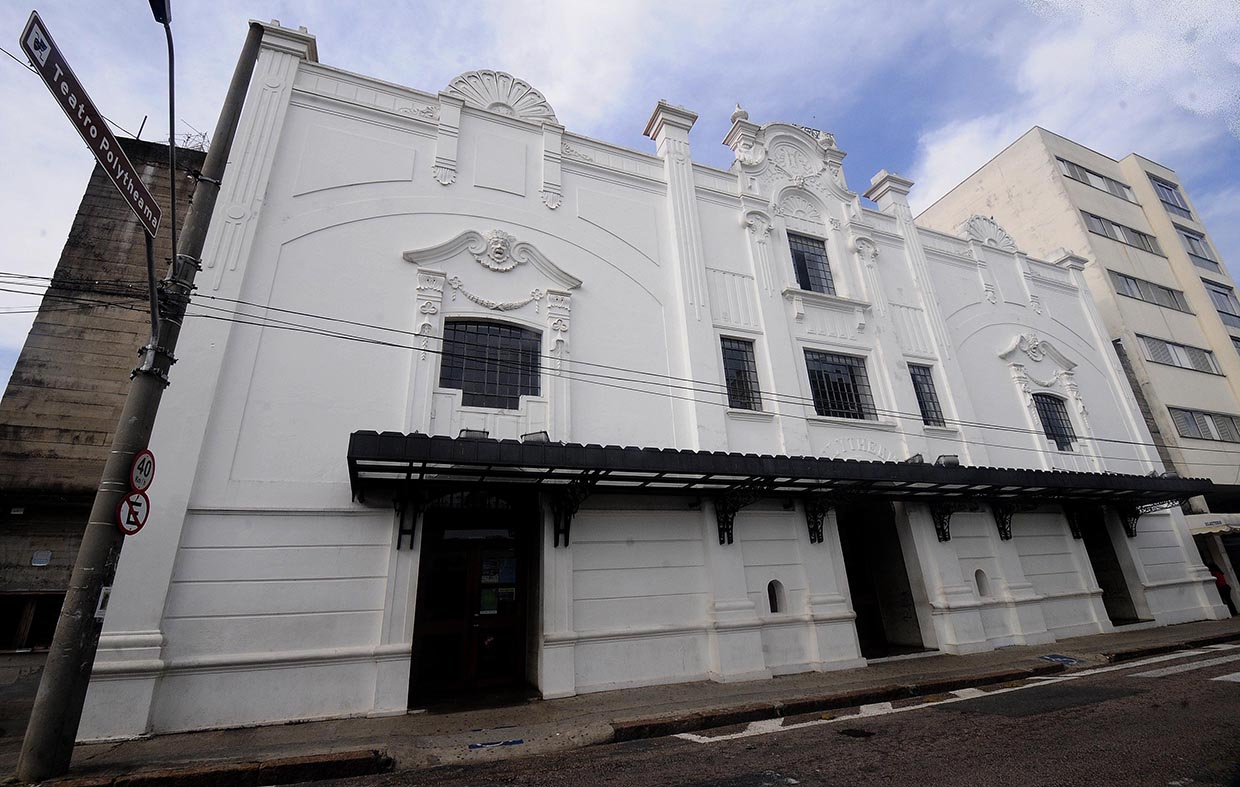
- Skyline of the city in 2015 Ponte Torta (Crooked Bridge) Teatro Polytheama Jundiaí

- Flag Coat of arms
- Nickname: Grapeland
- Motto(s): Etiam, per me Brasilia magna!
- Location of Jundiaí in the state of São Paulo

- Location of Jundiaí in Brazil
- Coordinates: 23°11′09″S 46°53′02″W
- Country: Brazil
- Region: Southeast
- State: São Paulo
- Metropolitan Region: Jundiaí
- Founded: December 14, 1655- of Village of Parnahyba

Government
  - Mayor: Luiz Fernando Machado (PSDB)

Area
  - Total: 431.20 km^{2} (166.49 sq mi)
- Elevation: 762 m (2,500 ft)

Population (2022)
  - Total: 443,221
  - Estimate (2025): 463,039
  - Density: 940.94/km^{2} (2,437.0/sq mi)

GDP (PPP, constant 2015 values)
  - Year: 2023
  - Total: $32.4 billion
  - Per capita: $38,600
- Time zone: UTC-3 (Brasilia Official Time)
  - Summer (DST): UTC-2 (Brazilian Daylight Saving Time, (Not used anymore due to a bill of the Federal Government.))
- Postal Code: 13200-000
- Area code: +55 11
- HDI (2010): 0.822 – very high
- Website: www.jundiai.sp.gov.br

Jundiaí is a municipality in the state of São Paulo, in the Southeast Region of Brazil, located 57 kilometres (35 mi) north of São Paulo. The population of the city is 443,221 (2022), with an area of 431.20 km^{2} (166.49 sq mi).

The elevation is 761 m. The GDP of the city is U$16.6 billion (R$36.6 billion). The budget for 2013 is U$787 million (R$1.63 billion), according to the official data of the City Hall.

== History ==
The locally most-accepted history of the first non-native American colonizers of the locale were Rafael de Oliveira and Petronilha Rodrigues Antunes who fled São Paulo for political reasons and who in 1615 then founded what became known as the Freguesia de Nossa Senhora do Desterro ("The Parish of Our Lady of the Landless").

The municipality was officially founded on December 14, 1655, when it was elevated to the category of village. Its first urbanization was carried out in 1657. Jundiaí has borders with Várzea Paulista, Campo Limpo Paulista, Franco da Rocha, Cajamar, Pirapora do Bom Jesus, Cabreúva, Itupeva, Louveira, Vinhedo, Itatiba and Jarinu.

Formerly spelled Jundiahy, the name of the town comes from the Tupi language, jundiá means "fish with barbs" (the Rhamdia quelen species) and í means river. Loosely translated, it means "Catfish River."

The city received massive numbers of Italian immigrants in the late 19th century and early 20th century, making most of the city's inhabitants of Italian descent, which constitutes about 75% of the city's population. Amongst other immigrant groups, there are: Portuguese, Spanish, German and small amounts of Hungarian and Slavic peoples.

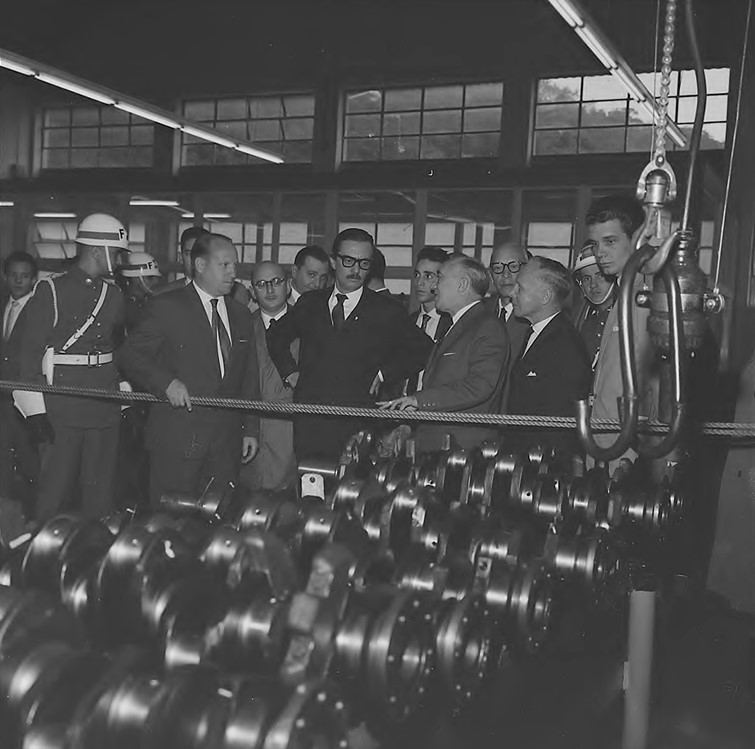
President Jânio Quadros opening a factory in Jundiaí in 1961

Recently, Jundiaí has enjoyed a steep population growth, in large part fueled by a shift of residents from the megalopolis of São Paulo, seeking better living conditions.

== Demographics ==
Historical population (municipality)
Year	Population	%±
1920	44,437
1940	58,203	31.0%
1950	69,165	18.8%
1960	118,874	71.9%
1970	169,076	42.2%
1980	258,809	53.1%
1991	289,269	11.8%
2000	323,397	11.8%
2010	370,126	14.4%
2022	443,221	19.7%

== Geography ==
=== Climate ===
Climate data for Jundiaí, elevation 789 m (2,589 ft), (2011–2020 normals, extremes 2010–2022)
Month	Jan	Feb	Mar	Apr	May	Jun	Jul	Aug	Sep	Oct	Nov	Dec	Year
Record high °C (°F)	37.2 (99.0)	36.1 (97.0)	34.7 (94.5)	34.3 (93.7)	30.9 (87.6)	30.9 (87.6)	31.4 (88.5)	34.2 (93.6)	37.2 (99.0)	40.5 (104.9)	37.2 (99.0)	35.5 (95.9)	40.5 (104.9)
Mean daily maximum °C (°F)	29.9 (85.8)	30.3 (86.5)	28.7 (83.7)	27.8 (82.0)	24.8 (76.6)	24.7 (76.5)	24.7 (76.5)	25.7 (78.3)	28.3 (82.9)	29.0 (84.2)	28.8 (83.8)	29.9 (85.8)	27.7 (81.9)
Daily mean °C (°F)	24.4 (75.9)	24.6 (76.3)	23.4 (74.1)	22.2 (72.0)	19.2 (66.6)	18.7 (65.7)	18.3 (64.9)	19.2 (66.6)	21.6 (70.9)	22.9 (73.2)	22.9 (73.2)	24.2 (75.6)	21.8 (71.3)
Mean daily minimum °C (°F)	18.8 (65.8)	18.9 (66.0)	18.2 (64.8)	16.7 (62.1)	13.7 (56.7)	12.7 (54.9)	11.9 (53.4)	12.8 (55.0)	15.0 (59.0)	16.8 (62.2)	17.0 (62.6)	18.4 (65.1)	15.9 (60.6)
Record low °C (°F)	11.1 (52.0)	15.1 (59.2)	13.9 (57.0)	9.0 (48.2)	5.6 (42.1)	1.6 (34.9)	2.6 (36.7)	3.5 (38.3)	7.3 (45.1)	9.3 (48.7)	10.1 (50.2)	12.1 (53.8)	1.6 (34.9)
Average precipitation mm (inches)	191.5 (7.54)	122.9 (4.84)	141.6 (5.57)	61.6 (2.43)	56.1 (2.21)	69.3 (2.73)	24.3 (0.96)	20.7 (0.81)	38.4 (1.51)	72.7 (2.86)	121.7 (4.79)	140.4 (5.53)	1,061.2 (41.78)
Average precipitation days (≥ 1.0 mm)	16.3	11.7	13.1	7.9	7.2	9.5	6.3	4.6	4.9	8.5	10.1	13.9	114
Source: Centro Integrado de Informações Agrometeorológicas

== Agriculture ==
Fazenda Ermida, a historic rural estate dating back to c.1848 involved with coffee production in the region

The region burst onto the national stage with the production of grapes, especially with the "pink" variety of the Niagara grape. To stimulate the production of grapes, with the support of the Associação Agrícola de Jundiaí e Prefeitura (Agriculture Association of Jundiaí and Town Hall), in 1934 Antenor Soares Gandra created the Festa da Uva (Grape Festival), not to be confused with a festival of the same name in Caxias do Sul, Rio Grande do Sul. Since 1964 the Festa da Uva is celebrated every even-numbered year, alternating with the Festa do Morango (Strawberry Festival) in the park Parque Comendador Antonio Carbonari but most known as the Parque da Uva (Grape Park).

The first Festa do Morango was in 1965 in the Poste neighborhood of the city. Later, because of the increase in agriculture participants and of the public interest, the event was transferred to the Parque Comendador Antonio Carbonari.

== Tourism ==
The Serra do Japi (Japi mountain range), situated southeast of the city, is a state park that has a natural reserve with one of the largest forested areas in the state of São Paulo, with beautiful landscapes and many opportunities for ecotourism, large hotel-farms and extreme sports.

The Jundiahy section is a historical area amongst the rivers Jundiai, Guapeva and Mato. It is an affluent neighborhood with fancy houses, gardens and a traditional small community business.

== Sports ==
Paulista is the city's football (soccer) club. The team, which plays at Jayme Cintra Stadium, was the champion of Copa do Brasil 2005 (Cup of Brazil).

== Media ==
In telecommunications, the city was served by Telecomunicações de São Paulo. In July 1998, this company was acquired by Telefónica, which adopted the Vivo brand in 2012. The company is currently an operator of cell phones, fixed lines, internet (fiber optics/4G) and television (satellite and cable).

== Transportation ==
Jundiaí Airport serves the city and region for small airplanes. Jundiaí station links the city to Luz Station in central São Paulo with CPTM (Companhia Paulista de Trens Metropolitanos), a rapid transit service. It has a system of public transportation that costs R$5,00 (US$0,97) for a one way ticket, as of 2023. Most of the buses have wheelchair lifts and a few have monitors that broadcast videos about the city and education.

Entrance to Jundiaí CPTM train station

The lines are all connected by terminais (terminals), what makes the users' transportation faster and cheaper since there is free circulation in the terminals to the linhas alimentadoras (feeding lines), which carry the passengers from the terminals to their respective destinations . Regular users can register and use a yellow, reloadable electronic card. Students can register for a blue card that charges only half price for each ticket. The elderly or disabled can register for a grey or green card which allows free admittance.

== Twin towns and sister cities ==
Iwakuni, Japan
Padua, Italy
(United States) Trenton, USA

== Notable people ==
- Adriano Basso (1975), footballer.
- Grafite (1979), footballer.
- Ana Carolina Reston Macan (1985–2006), -model.
- Antônio de Queirós Teles, barão de Jundiaí (1789–1870), politician.
- Antônio de Queirós Teles, conde do Parnaíba (1831–1888), politician, and president of São Paulo Province (1886–1887).
- Dalmo Gaspar
- Décio Pignatari (1927–2012), writer and poet.
- Doni (1979), footballer.
- Duília de Mello (1963), astronomer.
- Eloísa Mafalda (1924), actress.
- Fabio Zanon (1966), musician.
- José do Patrocínio Oliveira (Zé Carioca), (1904–1987), musician and voice actor.
- Nenê (1981), footballer.
- Reginaldo (1983-), footballer.
- Guilherme Salas (1994), racing driver.
- Felipe Baptista (2003), racing driver

== Religion ==
Christianity is present in the city as follows:

=== Catholic Church ===
Igreja de Nossa Senhora da Conceição in Vila Arens, Jundiaí

The Catholic church in the municipality is part of the Roman Catholic Diocese of Jundiaí.

=== Protestant Church ===
The most diverse evangelical beliefs are present in the city, mainly Pentecostal, including the Assemblies of God in Brazil (the largest evangelical church in the country), Christian Congregation in Brazil, among others. These denominations are growing more and more throughout Brazil.

== See also ==
- Santos-Jundiaí Railroad
- Line 9 (CPTM)
- Line 10 (CPTM)
- List of municipalities in São Paulo
