= Luiz Fernando Machado =

Brazilian politician (born 1977)

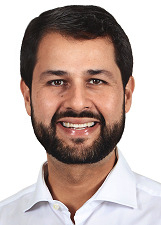
- Machado in 2020

Member of the Chamber of Deputies
- In office 1 February 2011 – 31 January 2015
- Constituency: São Paulo

Personal details
- Born: 8 October 1977 (age 48)
- Party: Liberal Party (since 2023)

Luiz Fernando Arantes Machado (born 8 October 1977) is a Brazilian politician serving as secretary of privatization of São Paulo since 2025. From 2011 to 2015, he was a member of the Chamber of Deputies. From 2017 to 2024, he served as mayor of Jundiaí.
