= Lapa, Rio de Janeiro =

Neighborhood in the city of Rio de Janeiro, Brazil

Lapa
- Neighborhood
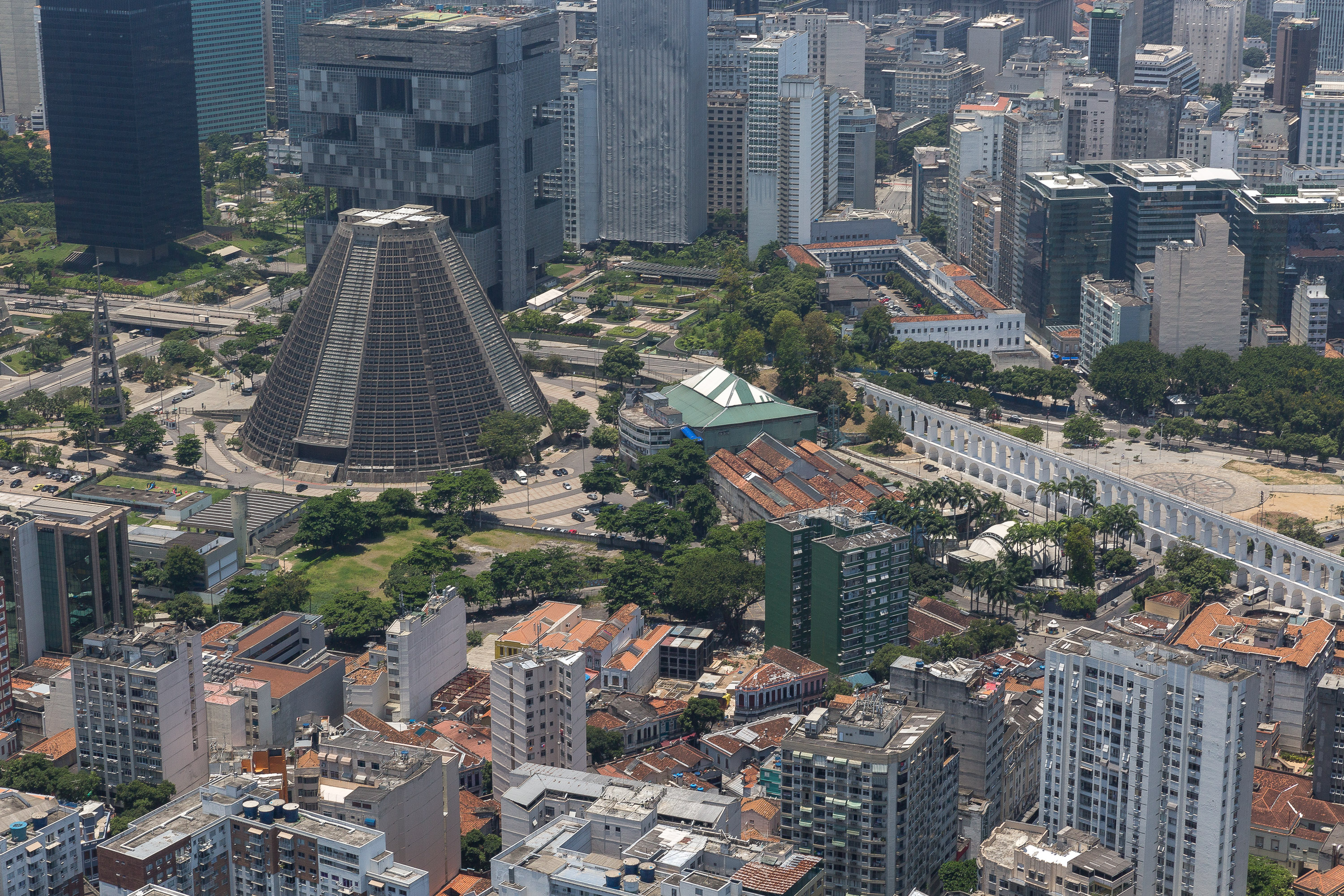
- Aerial view of Lapa

- Location in Rio de Janeiro Lapa (Brazil)
- Coordinates: 22°54′49″S 43°10′54″W
- Country: Brazil
- State: Rio de Janeiro (RJ)
- Municipality/City: Rio de Janeiro
- Zone: Zona Central

Lapa is a neighborhood in Rio de Janeiro, Brazil. Located in the Zona Central, it is known for its historical monuments and vibrant nightlife.

The neighborhood is home to the Arcos da Lapa, an aqueduct inaugurated by colonial authorities in 1750, and the Passeio Público, the city's first public park, which was built in 1783 and remodelled in 1860.

Since the early 1950s, Lapa has been known for its lively cultural scene, featuring numerous restaurants and bars where Brazilian artists and intellectuals gather. It remains renowned for its venues offering various forms of Brazilian music. Sala Cecília Meireles, an essential venue for chamber music, is also located in Lapa.

== Overview ==
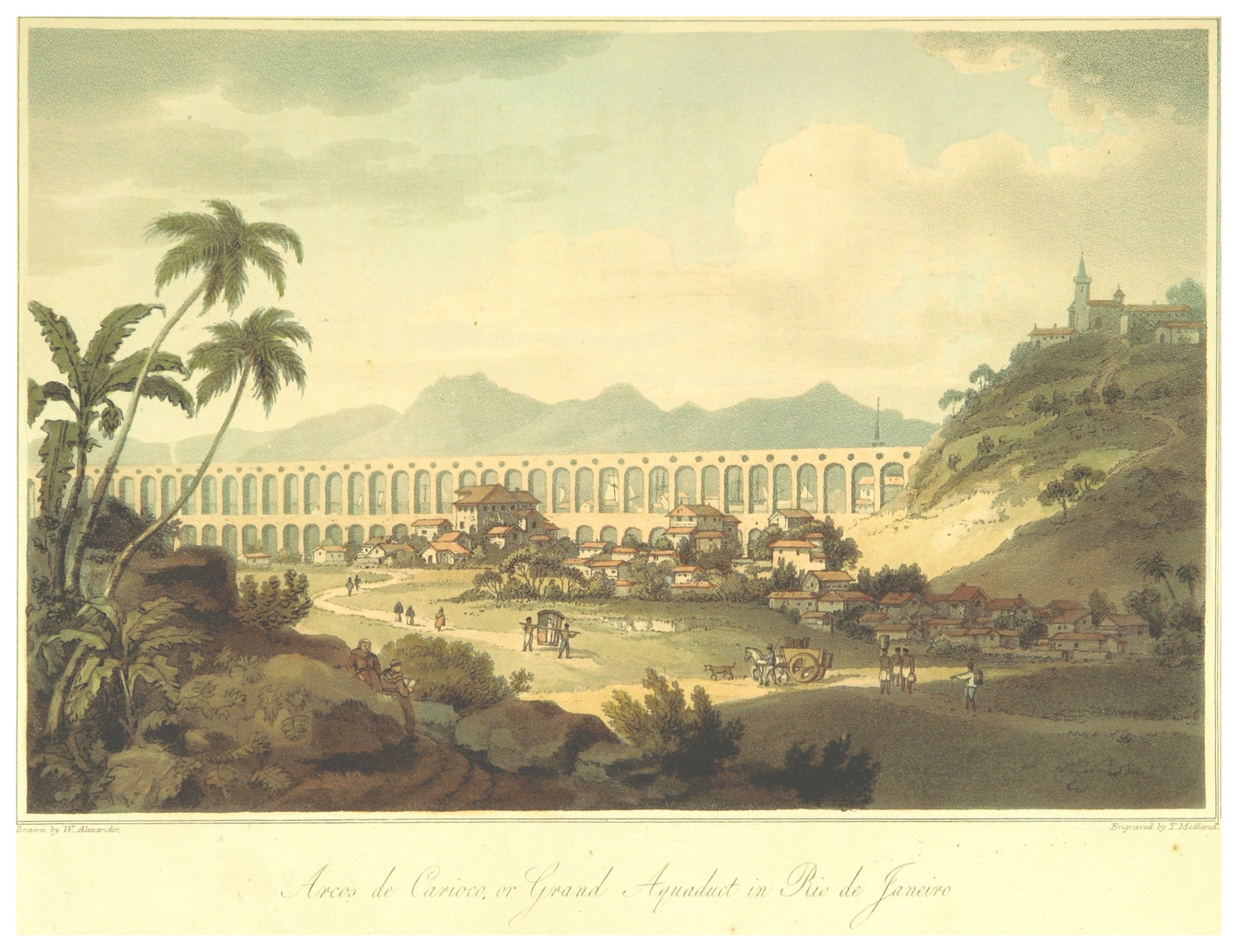
The Aqueduct, and settlement in 1792

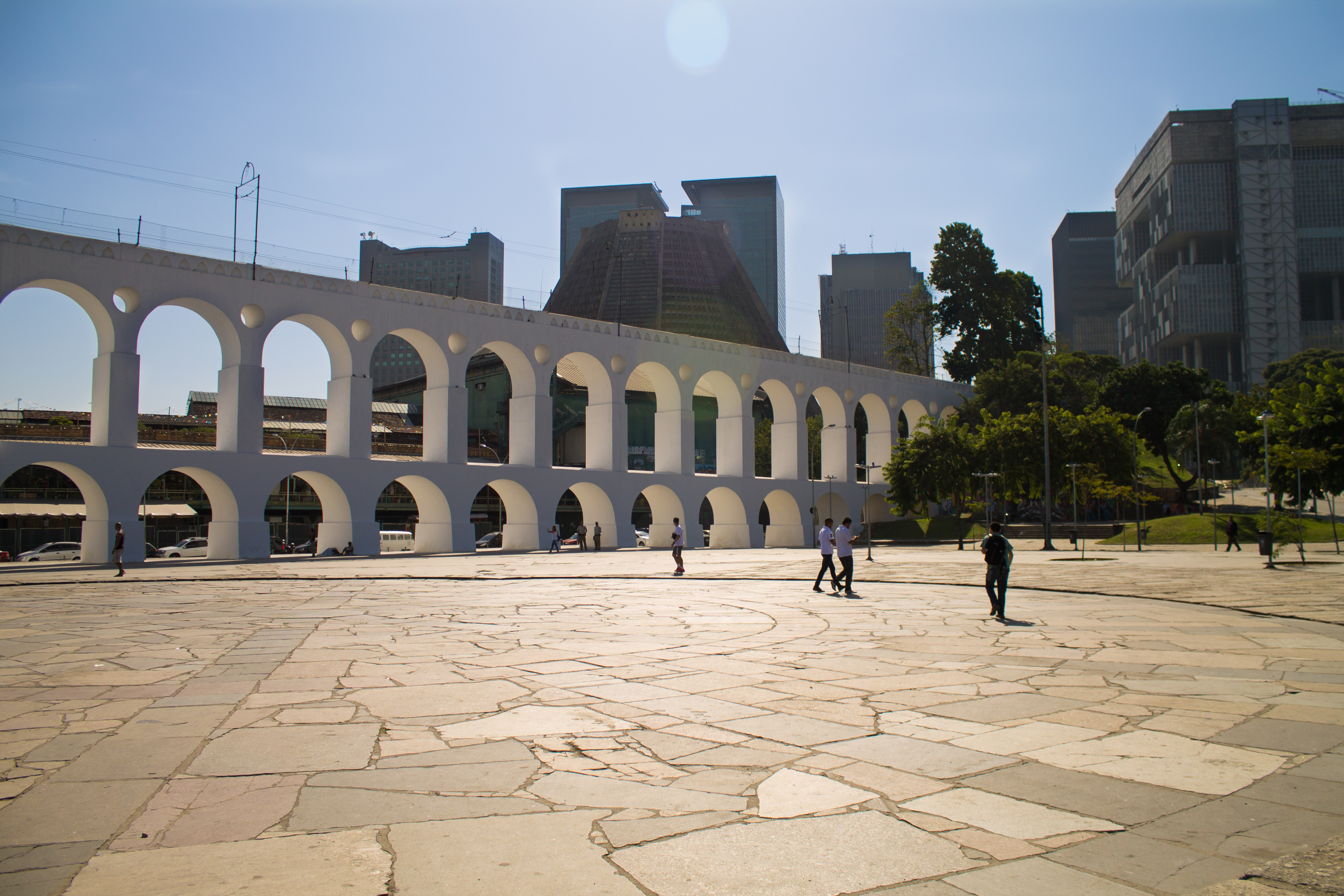
The Carioca Aqueduct, also known as Arcos da Lapa.

The neighborhood of Lapa in Rio de Janeiro is known as the "cradle of Bohemian Rio". It is also famous for its architecture, including the Carioca Aqueduct, which was originally constructed in 1750 to connect the springs of the Carioca River to a fountain in the Largo da Carioca, but has been used as a viaduct for the Santa Teresa Tram since 1896. The aqueduct is 17.6 m (58 ft) high, 270 m (890 ft) long and includes 42 Roman-style arches. It was listed as a heritage site by IPHAN in 1938.

The Square of the Brazilian Armed Forces, once a quiet spot next to the arches, has been replaced by Circo Voador. Arches Street's boundary begins at the south end, where the Road of Glory becomes Rua da Lapa. On the border with Santa Teresa, nestled among its hills, is the neighborhood of Fátima.

In an attempt to revive the spirit of the deteriorating residential district, its inhabitants created the movement "I Am From Lapa." They drew inspiration from the famous advertising campaign "I Love New York," which they believed helped revitalize New York City during its decline in the 1970s. With government support and the participation of most shops in Lapa, the "I Am From Lapa" movement spread throughout the area, but it did little to improve the safety of the residential environment.

Lapa has a lower population density and less traffic compared to other regions of the city. The neighbourhood is home to the headquarters and administrative buildings of many large companies, such as Petrobras and BNDES, as well as numerous commercial buildings on Chile Avenue (including Ventura I and II). These features bring in residents from the north, south, and west of Rio de Janeiro who seek to live closer to work and to avoid traffic jams. There is high housing demand, as the neighbourhood is seen as offering a high standard of living.

== Culture ==
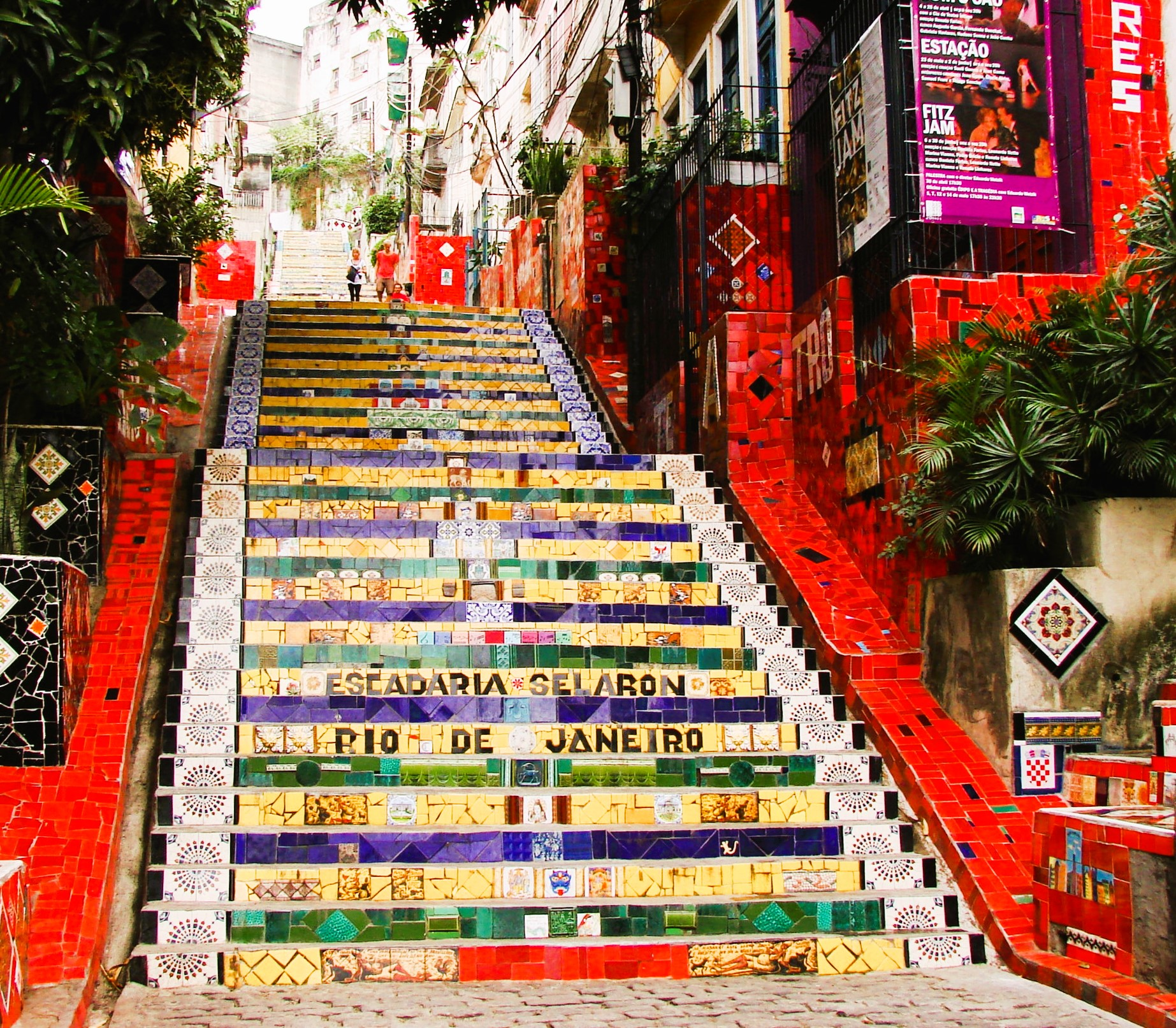
Escadaria Selarón

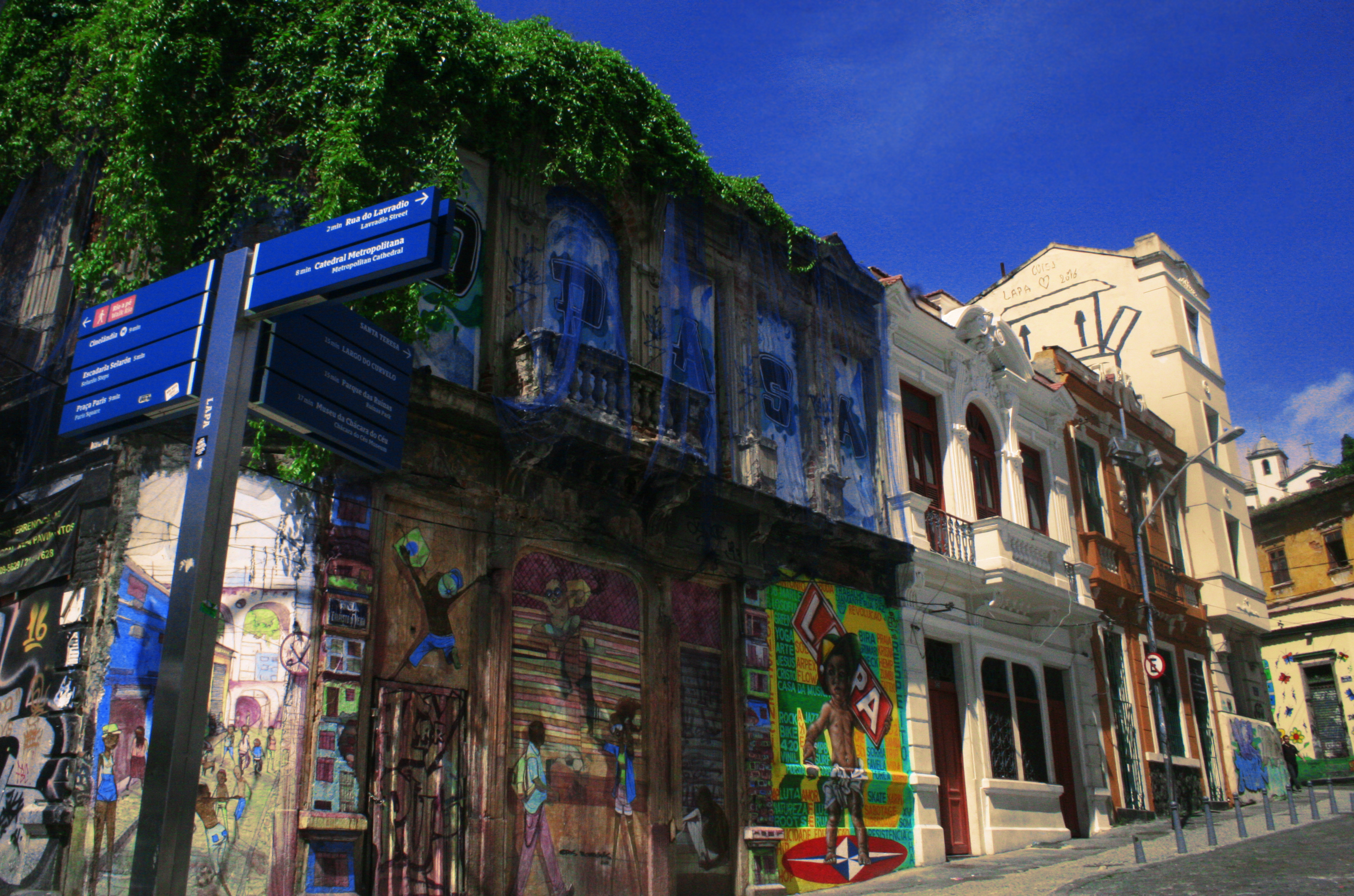
Streets of Lapa.

The neighborhood hosts a melting pot of diverse urban tribes. Since the 1950s, Lapa has been referred to as "Montmartre Carioca." Intellectuals, artists, politicians, and especially the people of Rio have come together to celebrate samba, forró, MPB (música popular brasileira), choro, and, more recently, electronic music and rock.

The major thoroughfares, Mem de Sá, Rua do Riachuelo, and Lavradio, feature attractions such as the Sala Cecília Meireles, which is considered one of the best concert venues for chamber music in Rio.

The Public Promenade, the National School of Music, the Church of Our Lady of Lapa do Desterro, and the Escadaria Selarón are historic monuments of old Rio.

== Music ==
The quarter contains multiple well regarded music venues, including theAsa Branca, a key venue for forró; Bar Semente, where artists such as Teresa Cristina and the group Casuarina have performed; Ernesto; Sacrilégio Café Cultural; Rio Scenarium; and Carioca da Gema, where samba is the central genre. The venue Lapa 40 Graus, on Rua do Riachuelo next to the Democratic Club, is a space for dancing samba, choro, and gafieira. Electronic music and rock concerts venues include Progress and Casting Flying Circus, which opened in 2004. There are also numerous bars and venues catering to all tastes.
