= Bruno Seidlhofer =

Austrian classical pianist

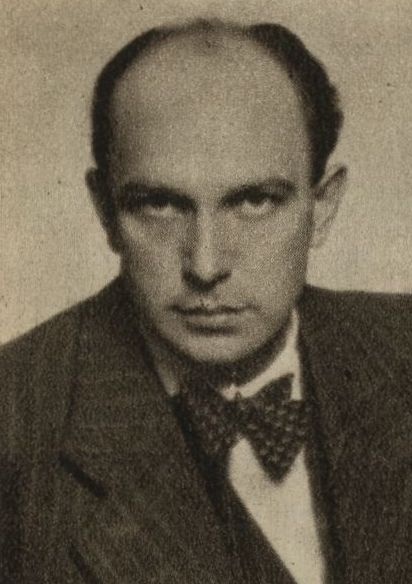
Bruno Seidlhofer, ca. 1938

Bruno Georg Seidlhofer (5 September 1905 – 19 February 1982) was an Austrian pianist, organist, academic teacher and piano teacher at the University of Music and Performing Arts Vienna.

== Life ==
Born in Vienna, Seidlhofer taught piano at the Academy of Music from 1938 to 1981, and was a full professor there from 1956. From 1962 to 1968, he held a guest professorship at the Hochschule für Musik und Tanz Köln. He taught until 1981, and his students included Alexander Jenner, Nelson Freire, Martha Argerich, Rudolf Buchbinder and Friedrich Gulda. He also performed as an organist in concert halls and on the radio.

Seidlhofer died in Vienna at the age of 76.
