= Arnaldo Cohen =

Brazilian pianist

- Occupation: Pianist
- Spouse: Karina Maucha Cohen

Arnaldo Cohen is a Brazilian pianist.

== Biography ==
Parallel to his piano studies, he also received degrees in Engineering and Violin from the Federal University of Rio de Janeiro, and started his professional career as a violinist of the Rio de Janeiro Opera House Orchestra. Soon he decided to devote more time to playing piano and continued his studies with Jacques Klein, Bruno Seidlhofer, Edith Fischer, and Dieter Weber. In 1972 he won the first prize of the Ferruccio Busoni International Piano Competition.

Arnaldo Cohen has been invited to perform as soloist, among others, by the Philadelphia Orchestra, Los Angeles Philharmonic, Royal Philharmonic Orchestra, Houston Symphony, Cleveland Orchestra, Orchestra dell'Accademia Nazionale di Santa Cecilia, Bellingham Festival Orchestra, Bavarian Radio Symphony Orchestra, Orchestre de la Suisse Romande and the Milwaukee Symphony Orchestra conducted by conductors such as Kurt Masur, Yehudi Menuhin, Wolfgang Sawallisch and Edo de Waart. He has performed in concert halls such as Wigmore Hall, Frick Museum and the Concertgebouw.

Arnaldo Cohen served as a professor of piano at the Royal Academy of Music in London and currently is a professor at the Jacobs School of Music in Indiana (USA). In October 2012 Cohen was appointed as the Artistic Director of Portland Piano International, the presenter of one of the leading solo piano recital series in North America.
