= Sala Cecília Meireles =

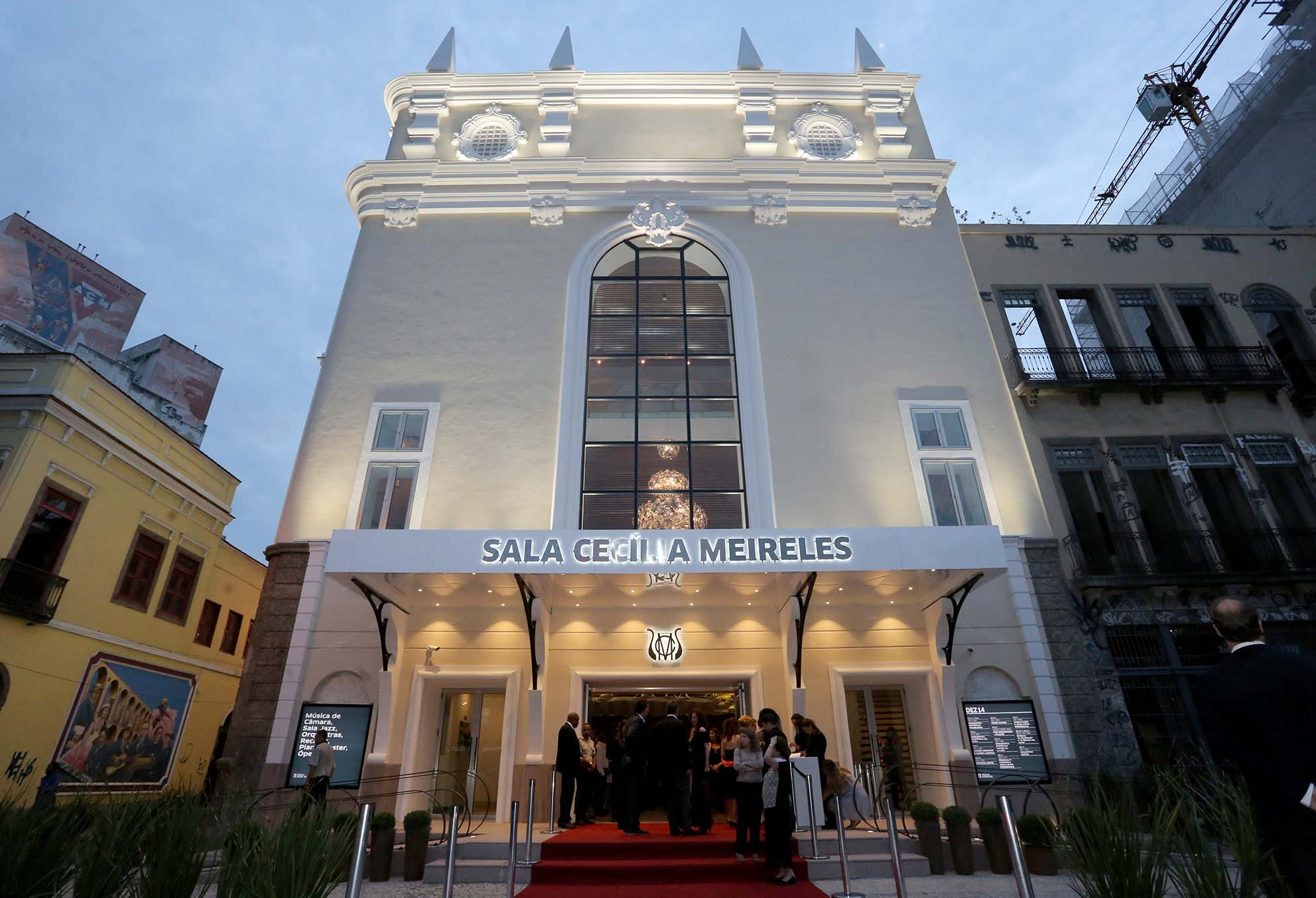
Sala Cecília Meireles in November 2014

Sala Cecília Meireles is a theatre in the Lapa district of Rio de Janeiro, Brazil. It is noted for its chamber music and is considered to be one of the best venues in terms of acoustics in the city, as well as one of the most traditional in its design. The 670-seat theatre is named in honor of Brazilian author and amateur pianist Cecília Meireles.

== History ==
The building was erected in the late 19th century as the Grande Hotel da Lapa, which hosted many major landowners and politicians of the First Brazilian Republic.

In 1948, the building was renovated and converted into a cinema called Cine Colonial. Two decades later, in 1965, as part of the celebrations marking the fourth centenary of the city of Rio de Janeiro, the former cinema was transformed into the Sala Cecília Meireles. The renovation aimed to create a venue dedicated to classical music, particularly chamber music.

The building was renovated under the leadership of Rio Governor Marcello Alencar, which included acoustic treatment and was completed in 2014. The renovation also included the creation of a new 150-person auditorium, the Auditório Guiomar Novaes, and a new reception space, the Espaço Ayres de Andrade.

Since 2004, the theatre has been led by the composer João Guilherme Ripper.

== Links ==
- Official website Sala Cecília Meireles
