= Luboshutz =

Luboshutz, Lyuboshutz, Luboshitz or Lyuboshutz (Cyrillic: Любошиц) is a Jewish surname that may refer to the following notable people:

- Anna Luboshutz (1887–1975), Russian cellist
- Joseph Liboschitz (1783–1824), Russian physician
- Lea Luboshutz (1885–1965), Russian violinist, sister of Anna and Pierre
- Pierre Luboshutz (1891–1971), Russian pianist, brother of Anna and Lea
