= Genia Nemenoff =

French classical pianist

- Born: Genia Nemenoff; October 23, 1905; Paris, France
- Died: September 19, 1989 (aged 83) Manhattan, New York City, U.S.
- Occupation: Classical pianist
- Instrument: Piano
- Years active: 1937–1968

Genia Nemenoff (October 23, 1905 - September 19, 1989) was a French classical pianist and a co-founder of the “Luboshutz & Nemenoff” piano duo formed in 1937.

Nemenoff was well known for her pianistic collaboration with her lifelong duet partner and husband, Russian pianist, Pierre Luboshutz. Considered among the greatest duo-piano teams of all time, Nemenoff and Luboshutz toured broadly in the Western hemisphere, including Europe and South Africa during 1940-1950s.

== Early life ==
Nemenoff was born in Paris in 1905 to Russian parents. She studied at the Paris Conservatoire with Isidor Philipp and was a pupil of Wager Swayne in her earlier piano training. An avid collaborative pianist, Nemenoff began her performing career primarily as an accompanist for singers.

== Marriage with Luboshutz ==
The romance between Nemenoff and Luboshutz began in 1931. "The couple first met at the Paris Conservatoire where Luboshutz was conducting a piano masterclass for a small group of professionals" and Nemenoff was among the participants. In that year, after her successful Paris debut and tours throughout Europe, Nemenoff married Luboshutz in the United States and they settled in New York City.

The couple's move was also in response to the immigration of Nemenoff's sister-in-law, the celebrated Russian violinist, Lea Luboshutz. She moved to the States due to the Russian revolution and had served as a faculty member at the Curtis Institute of Music in Philadelphia since 1928.

== “Luboshutz & Nemenoff” piano duo ==
The husband and wife duo-piano team was launched with a concert in South Bend, Indiana on October 15, 1936, and on January 18, 1937, Nemenoff made her New York concert debut with Luboshutz in Town Hall, New York City. Due to the huge success, the couple was "highly acclaimed as duo pianists". The duo's partnership was characterized by The Remington Site as “lean, technically practically perfect and has a lot of strength and drive.” Their performance was given excellent reviews and praise from many critics and contemporary musicians:

“They gave a lively account of themselves…Their playing had coordination, buoyancy and grace, and on occasion it was searching in its grasp of feeling and flavor.” - Howard Taubman, In The New York Times, 1937

“In all his years of concert going this reviewer has never before known two‐piano artistry comparable to this in plasticity, exquisiteness of de tail, or subtlety of coloring.”- Noel Straus, 1947

"One of our favorite duo-piano teams of the past is Luboshutz and Nemenoff. Their style of playing was unique in the way they handled ritardandi and rubati together." - Anthony & Joseph Paratore, pianists

The Luboshutz & Nemenoff piano duo's notable concert appearance include a performance at the Tanglewood Festival with the Boston Symphony Orchestra and at Robin Hood Dell with the Philadelphia Orchestra. In 1956, they performed Mozart's Concerto in F for three pianos in collaboration with pianist Boris Goldovsky, son of Lea Luboshutz, as part of the Mozart bicentennial. The three pianists took a twenty-three piece orchestra on a five‐week tour. They reprised the collaboration two years later featuring keyboard music of J.S. Bach.

In promoting new duo piano literature, the couple premiered numerous works including not only transcriptions arranged by Luboshutz, but also pieces by new composers. On November 5, 1943, the duo premiered Bohuslav Martinu’s two-piano concerto with Eugene Ormandy and the Philadelphia Orchestra. This concerto was dedicated to the duo. Martinu composed the work after being impressed by their performance with conductor Serge Koussevitsky in 1942.

== Teaching career ==
Nemenoff served as the faculty member of New England Conservatory when her performance life was curtailed around 1960. She was also appointed by the Michigan State University, where she was the joint head of the piano department with Luboshutz from 1962 to 1968. She was also the only female faculty member of the department at that time. Nemenoff continued to teach after her husband's death in 1971. She has influenced many female pupils who later became well accomplished pianists, such as Patricia Medley, Barbara Dixon, etc.
