= Van Cliburn discography =

Harvey Lavan "Van" Cliburn Jr. (/ˈklaɪbɜːrn/; July 12, 1934 – February 27, 2013) was an American pianist who achieved worldwide recognition in 1958, at the age of 23, when he won the inaugural quadrennial International Tchaikovsky Piano Competition in Moscow during the Cold War.

== Recording career ==
Upon Cliburn's return to the United States, RCA Victor signed him to an exclusive contract and his subsequent recording of the Tchaikovsky Piano Concerto No. 1 won the 1958 Grammy Award for Best Classical Performance. It was certified a gold record in 1961, and it became the first classical album to go platinum, achieving that certification in 1989.

== List of recordings ==
Most of Van Cliburn's recordings were originally issued on LP records, with many also available on reel-to-reel, cassette, and 8-track. During the 1980s, RCA Victor reissued most of Cliburn's recordings on compact disc in remasterings of variable quality. Shortly before Cliburn's death, a newly remastered, Original Jacket Collection boxed set of Cliburn's complete RCA Victor recordings was issued, with the exception of the album Van Cliburn Conducts (LSC-2807), Cliburn's sole recording as a conductor.

A number of recordings, mostly originating from live concerts, have been issued on some smaller labels, including Testament.

| Year of issue | Album title and details | Recording date(s) | US BB | LP catalog no. | Record label |
|---|---|---|---|---|---|
| 1958 | Tchaikovsky Concerto No. 1: Tchaikovsky: Piano Concerto No. 1 in B-flat minor, Op. 23; RCA Victor Symphony Orchestra / Kirill Kondrashin, conductor | May 30, 1958 | 1 | LSC-2252 | RCA Victor |
| 1959 | Rachmaninoff Concerto No. 3: Rachmaninoff: Piano Concerto No. 3 in D minor, Op. 30; Symphony of the Air / Kirill Kondrashin, conductor | May 19, 1958 | 10 | LSC-2355 | RCA Victor |
| 1960 | Schumann Concerto: Schumann: Piano Concerto in A minor, Op. 54; Chicago Symphony Orchestra / Fritz Reiner, conductor | April 16, 1960 | 134 | LSC-2455 | RCA Victor |
| 1961 | Prokofiev and MacDowell Concertos: Prokofiev: Piano Concerto No. 3 in C major, Op. 26; MacDowell: Piano Concerto No. 2 in D minor, Op. 23; Chicago Symphony Orchestra / Walter Hendl, conductor | October, 1960 | — | LSC-2507 | RCA Victor |
| 1961 | Beethoven “Emperor” Concerto: Beethoven: Piano Concerto No. 5 in E-flat major, Op. 73; Chicago Symphony Orchestra / Fritz Reiner, conductor | | May, 1961 | — | LSC-2562 | RCA Victor |
| 1961 | My Favorite Chopin: Chopin: Polonaise in A-flat major, Op. 53 "Heroic" / Nocturne in B major, Op. 62, No. 1 / Fantasie in F minor, Op. 49 / Etude in A minor, Op. 25, No. 11 "Winter Wind" / Etude in E major, Op. 10, No. 3 / Ballade in A-flat major, Op. 47 / Waltz in C-sharp minor, Op. 64, No. 2 / Scherzo in C-sharp minor, Op. 39 | May, 1961 | 71 | LSC-2576 | RCA Victor |
| 1962 | Brahms Concerto No. 2: Brahms: Piano Concerto No. 2 in B-flat major, Op. 83; Chicago Symphony Orchestra / Fritz Reiner, conductor / Robert La Marchina, cello solo | May, 1961 | 25 | LSC-2581 | RCA Victor |
| 1962 | Rachmaninoff Concerto No. 2: Rachmaninoff: Piano Concerto No. 2 in C minor, Op. 18; Chicago Symphony Orchestra / Fritz Reiner, conductor | March–April, 1962 | — | LSC-2601 | RCA Victor |
| 1963 | Beethoven Concerto No. 4: Beethoven: Piano Concerto No. 4 in G major, Op. 58; Chicago Symphony Orchestra / Fritz Reiner, conductor | April, 1963 | — | LSC-2680 | RCA Victor |
| 1964 | Brahms Piano Concerto No. 1: Brahms: Piano Concerto No. 1 in D minor, Op. 15; Boston Symphony Orchestra, / Erich Leinsdorf, conductor | March, 1964 | — | LSC-2724 | RCA Victor |
| 1965 | Van Cliburn Conducts: Vaughan Williams: Serenade to Music; Interlochen Youth Orchestra and Chorus / Van Cliburn, conductor | August, 1964 | — | LSC-2807 | RCA Victor |
| 1966 | Beethoven: “Les Adieux” Sonata, Mozart, Sonata in C: Beethoven: Piano Sonata No. 26 in E-flat major, Op. 81a "Les Adieux"; W. A. Mozart: Piano Sonata in C major, K. 330 | March, August 1966 | — | LSC-2931 | RCA Victor |
| 1968 | Chopin: Piano Sonata No. 2 in B-flat minor, Op. 35; Piano Sonata No. 3 in B minor, Op. 58 | August, 1967 | — | LSC-3053 | RCA Red Seal |
| 1969 | Grieg, Liszt Concertos: Grieg: Piano Concerto in A minor, Op. 16; Liszt: Piano Concerto No. 1 in E-flat major, S. 124; Philadelphia Orchestra / Eugene Ormandy, conductor | August 12, 1968 | — | LSC-3065 | RCA Red Seal |
| 1970 | Chopin: Concerto No. 1: Chopin: Piano Concerto No. 1 in E minor, Op. 11; Philadelphia Orchestra / Eugene Ormandy, conductor | August 18, 1969 | — | LSC-3147 | RCA Red Seal |
| 1970 | My Favorite Encores: Chopin: Etude in C minor, Op. 10, No. 12 "Revolutionary" / Nocturne in E major, Op. 62, No. 2 / Scherzo in B-flat minor, Op. 31; Debussy: Reflections on the Water (from Images, book II); Szymanowski: Etude in B-flat minor, Op. 4, No. 3; Scriabin: Etude in D-sharp minor, Op. 8, No. 12; Rachmaninoff: Etude-Tableaux in E-flat minor, Op. 39, No. 5 | August, 1970 | — | LSC-3185 | RCA Red Seal |
| 1971 | Rachmaninoff, Liszt: Rachmaninoff: Rhapsody on a Theme of Paganini, Op. 43; Liszt: Piano Concerto No. 2 in A major, S. 125; Philadelphia Orchestra / Eugene Ormandy, conductor | May 7, 1970 | — | LSC-3179 | RCA Red Seal |
| 1971 | Prokofiev, Barber Sonatas: Prokofiev: Piano Sonata No. 6 in A major, Op. 82; Barber: Piano Sonata in E-flat minor, Op. 26 | August, 1967; August 1970 | — | LSC-3229 | RCA Red Seal |
| 1971 | Beethoven Piano Concerto No. 3: Beethoven: Piano Concerto No. 3 in C minor, Op. 37; Philadelphia Orchestra / Eugene Ormandy, conductor | March, 1971 | — | LSC-3238 | RCA Red Seal |
| 1971 | My Favorite Brahms: Brahms: Rhapsody in B minor, Op. 79, No. 1 / Rhapsody in G minor, Op. 79, No. 2 / Intermezzo in B-flat minor, Op. 117, No. 2 / Intermezzo in C major, Op. 119, No. 3 / Waltz in A-flat major, Op. 39, No. 15 / Intermezzo in A minor, Op. 118, No. 1 / Ballade in G minor, Op. 118, No. 3 / Intermezzo in E-flat minor, Op. 118, No. 6 / Intermezzo in E major, Op. 116, No 6 / Capriccio in G minor, Op. 116, No. 3 | August, 1970; July–August, 1971 | — | LSC-3240 | RCA Red Seal |
| 1971 | Beethoven Sonatas: Piano Sonata No. 14 in C-sharp minor, Op. 27, No. 2 “Moonlight”; Piano Sonata No. 8 in C minor, Op. 13 “Pathétique”; Piano Sonata No. 23 in F minor, Op. 57 “Appassionata” | August, 1970 | — | LSC-4013 | RCA Red Seal |
| 1972 | Chopin's Greatest Hits: Chopin: Polonaise in A-flat major, Op. 53 "Heroic" / Mazurka in B-flat major, Op. 7, No 1 / Nocturne in E-flat major, Op. 9, No. 2 / Waltz in D-flat major, Op. 64, No. 1 "Minute" / Fantasie-Impromptu in C-sharp minor, Op. 66 / Waltz in C-sharp minor, Op. 64, No. 2 / Etude in C minor, Op. 10 No. 12 "Revolutionary" / Etude in E major, Op. 10, No. 3 / Prelude in A major, Op. 28, No. 7 / Prelude in D-flat major, Op. 28, No. 15 "Raindrop" / Scherzo in B-flat minor, Op. 31 | May, 1961; August, 1970; August, 1971 | — | LSC-5014 | RCA Red Seal |
| 1972 | My Favorite Debussy: Debussy: Etude pour lex octaves (from Etudes, Book I) / La Terasse des audiences du clair de lune (from Preludes, Book II) / Claire de Lune (from Suite Bergamasque) / La plus que lente / Jardins sous la pluie (from Estampes) / Reverie / Reflets dand l'eau / Feax d'artifice (from Preludes, Book II) / La Fille aux cheveaux de lin (from Preludes, Book I) / La Soiree dans Grenade (from Estampes) / L'Isle Joyeuse | January, 1972 | — | LSC-3283 | RCA Red Seal |
| 1972 | The World's Favorite Piano Music: Liszt: Liebestraum No. 3, S. 541; Chopin: Waltz in D-flat major, Op. 64, No, 1 "Minute" / Fantasie-Impromptu in C-sharp minor, Op. 66; Beethoven: Bagatelle in A minor, WoO 59 "Fur Elise"; W. A. Mozart: Turkish March, from Sonata, K. 331; Debussy: Reverie / Claire de lune; Rachmaninoff: Prelude in C-sharp minor, Op. 3, No. 2; Brahms: Waltz in A-flat major, Op. 39, No. 15; Schubert: Moment Musical in F minor, D. 780, No. 3; Schumann: Traumerai, from Kinderszenen, Op. 15; Tchaikovsky: Barcarolle, Op. 37a, No. 6, from The Seasons; MacDowell: To a Wild Rose, Op 51, No. 1, from Woodland Sketches | July–August, 1971; January–February, 1972 | — | LSC-3323 | RCA Red Seal |
| 1973 | Rachmaninoff: Rachmaninoff: Piano Sonata No. 2 in B-flat minor, Op. 36 (original version) / Etude-Tableaux in E-flat minor, Op. 39, No. 5 / Prelude in D major, Op. 23, No. 4 / Prelude in G major, Op. 32, No. 5 / Prelude in G minor, Op. 23, No. 5 / Prelude in E-flat major, Op. 23, No. 7 / Prelude in C minor, Op. 23, No. 7 | June, 1960; August, 1970; August, 1971; August, 1972 | — | ARL1-0352 | RCA Red Seal |
| 1976 | A Romantic Collection: Schumann: Romance in F-sharp major, Op. 28, No. 2; Chopin: Barcarolle in F-sharp major, Op. 60; Granados: The Maiden and the Nightingale, from Goyescas; Debussy: L'Isle Joyeuse; Liszt: Consolation No. 3 in D-flat major, S. 172; Rachmaninoff: Prelude in G-sharp minor, Op. 32, No. 12 / Prelude in G minor, Op. 23, No. 5; Tchaikovsky: Song of the Lark, from the Seasons, Op. 37a; Ravel: Pavanne for a Dead Princess / Toccata | August, 1971; July–August, 1975 | — | ARL1-1176 | RCA Red Seal |
| 1976 | Van Cliburn plays Liszt: Liszt: Sonata in B minor, S. 178 / Un sospiro in D-flat major, S. 144, No. 3 / Sonetto 123 del Petrarca, S. 158, No. 3 / Consolation No. 5 in E major, S. 172, No. 5 / Mephisto Waltz, S. 514 | August, 1973; July, 1975 | — | ARL1-1173 | RCA Red Seal |
| 1977 | Van Cliburn plays Brahms: Brahms: Variations and Fugue on a Theme by Handel, Op. 24 / Intermezzo in E-flat major, Op. 117, No. 1 / Intermezzo in B-flat minor, Op. 117, No. 2 / Intermezzo in C-sharp minor, Op. 117, No. 3 / Intermezzo in B minor, Op. 119, No. 1 / Intermezzo in E minor, Op. 119, No. 2 / Intermezzo in C major, Op. 119, No. 3 / Rhapsody in E-flat major, Op. 119, No. 4 | August, 1970; August, 1972; August, 1973; July- August, 1975; | — | ARL1-2280 | RCA Red Seal |
| 1994 | Van Cliburn in Moscow: Rachmaninoff: Rhapsody on a Theme of Paganini, Op. 43; Brahms: Piano Concerto No. 2 in B-flat major, Op. 83; Moscow Philharmonic Orchestra / Kirill Kondrashin, conductor | 1972 | — | 09026 62695 2 | RCA Victor |
| 2008 | 1958 Tchaikovsky Competition: Tchaikovsky: Piano Concerto No. 1 in B-flat minor, Op. 23; Rachmaninoff: Piano Concerto No. 3 in D minor, Op. 30; Kabalevsky: Rondo in A minor, Op. 59; Moscow Philharmonic Orchestra / Kirill Kondrashin, conductor | 1958 | — | SBT 1440 | Testament |
| 2009 | Recital: W. A. Mozart: Piano Sonata in C major, K. 330; Chopin: Scherzo in C-sharp minor, Op. 39 / Ballade in A-flat major, Op. 47 / Fantasie in F minor, Op. 49; Beethoven: Piano Sonata No. 23 in F minor, Op. 57 "Appassionata"; Prokofiev: Piano Sonata No. 6 in A major, Op. 82; Liszt: Hungarian Rhapsody No. 12 in C-sharp minor, S. 244 | June, 1959 | — | SBT2 1445 | Testament |
