= Ivakhiv =

Ivakhiv, feminine: Ivakhova (Ukrainian: Івахів, Івахова) is a Ukrainian patronymic surname derived from Івах, Ivakh, a form of the given name Ivan. Notable people with the surname include:

- Adrian Ivakhiv, Canadian scholar of environmental humanities and ecomedia
- Solomiya Ivakhiv, Ukrainian-born classical violinist
- Stepan Ivakhiv, Ukrainian businessman and politician
