= Anna Luboshutz =

Russian cellist (1887–1975)

- Анна Сауловна Любошиц
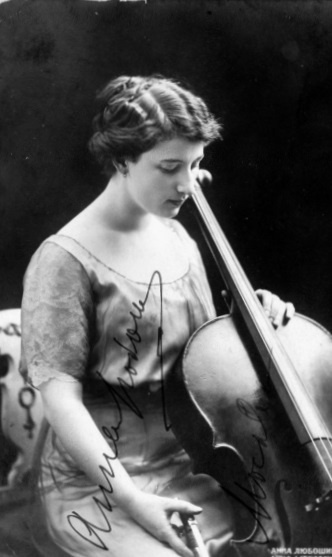
- Born: Anna Saulowna Luboshutz; 13 July 1887; Odessa, Ukraine
- Died: 20 February 1975; Moscow
- Burial place: Novodevichy Cemetery, Moscow
- Occupation: Cellist
- Spouse: Nikolai Adolfowitsch Schereschewski
- Children: Nadeschda Nikolaevna Schereschewskaja (1915-1998)

Anna Saulowna Luboshutz (Russian: Анна Сауловна Любошиц; 13 July 1887 – 20 February 1975) was a Russian cellist. She was a gold medal winner in 1908 at the Moscow Conservatory and had a major performing career in Russia. She was active as a soloist—often with the Moscow Philharmonic Orchestra—and in a chamber ensemble, the Luboshutz Trio, with her sister, the violinist Lea Luboshutz and her brother, the pianist Pierre Luboshutz. She was the first Soviet cellist to be awarded the title “Honored Artist of the Russian Soviet Federative Socialist Republic.”

== Early life ==
Anna came from a Jewish family of violinists whose last name can also be translated as Ljuboshitz, Lyuboshits or Lyuboshiz. Born in Odessa, Ukraine, her first teacher was her father. Her mother supported the family by selling pianos. After graduating from the cello class of the Odessa Conservatory in 1903, Anna followed her sister Lea to the Moscow Conservatory and joined Alfred von Glehn's cello class in the fall of 1904. She also studied piano with Dmitri Veiss. Although she was recognized first and foremost as a cellist, her piano playing was distinguished enough that she accompanied some of the great artists of the day including the violinist Eugène Ysaÿe when he came to Moscow. While a student at the Conservatory, she became part of an all-female piano trio featuring her sister as violinist and Esther Chernetskaya as pianist (all three would end up as gold medal winners at the Conservatory). A patron, Evgenii Frantsevich Vitachek, was so impressed with her playing that he loaned her a Guadagnini cello while she was a student. Upon her graduation, Mikhail Ippolitov-Ivanov took up a collection and purchased the cello for her.

== Career ==
When Chernetskaya decided to leave the trio, she was replaced briefly by another female pianist, Rosa Kaufman Pasternak, mother of the Nobel prize-winning writer, and the trio played at Leo Tolstoy's memorial in Moscow. Thereafter, Anna's brother, the pianist Pierre Luboshutz, took Rosa's place and the three siblings formed the Luboshutz Trio, an ensemble that performed throughout Russia including one tour in 1913-1914 that took them to over 50 cities. Anna also appeared regularly with the basso Fyodor Chaliapin and in concerts organized by Serge Koussevitzky. She also soloed with orchestras conducted by Arthur Nikisch and Emil Cooper. In 1910–1916 she took part in philanthropy concerts organized by the opera singer L.V. Sobinov (1872–1934) to benefit needy students. She gave numerous concerts and solo performances for more than a decade, starting in 1920 as she toured the Soviet Union. From 1924 to 1929 she also performed for radio programs.

Following the Russian Revolution, Luboshutz decided to remain in the Soviet Union with her husband, {ill|Nikolai Shereshevsky|ru|Шерешевский, Николай Адольфович}}, a distinguished physician who was treated well by the new regime. Her siblings Lea Lyuboshits (1885–1965, violin) and Peter Lyuboshits (1891–1971, piano), both notable musicians, emigrated to the United States after the Russian October Revolution in 1917 and Anna played with them in the "Luboschits Trio" from time to time. After the Revolution, she toured constantly throughout the Soviet Union performing not only in concert halls but in factories, aboard naval ships of the Northern Fleet, and even, on one occasion, deep underground in a coal mine in the Donats Basin region for the workers. When back in Moscow, she performed almost daily on radio, not only playing compositions for cello but also transcribing and performing works from her sister's violin repertoire. From 1931 to 1939, she was a regular soloist with the Moscow Philharmonic. In 1939, the Philharmonic honored her with an award which bore the inscription: “You are an artist whose conscientiousness and commitment to her work serves as an example to others.” Her final concert was on 19 February 1947.

Anna was the first Soviet cellist to be awarded the title “Honored Artist of the Russian Soviet Federative Socialist Republic.” With it came special status, a lifetime stipend, and the right to be buried in the cemetery at the Novodevichy Monastery, the most honored burial place in Moscow. Anna was also honored at a gala event in Moscow on 22 January 1969, after her eightieth birthday. The host for the evening was the leading Soviet cellist of the time, Mstislav Rostropovich.

== Personal life ==
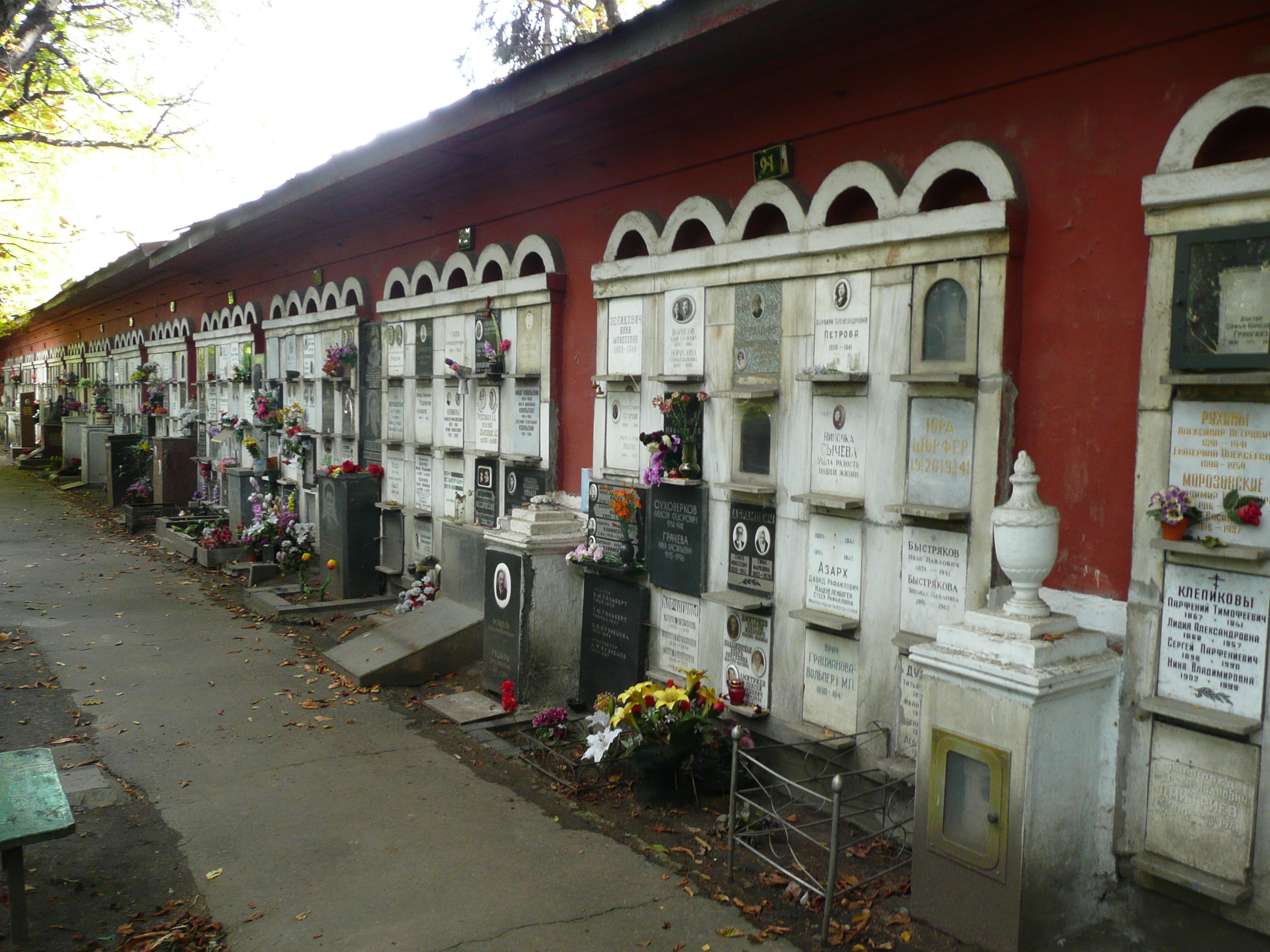
The wall of Novodevichy Cemetery is used as a columbarium.

Lyuboshits was married to the internist Nikolai Adolfowitsch Schereschewski and their daughter Nadeschda Nikolaevna Schereschewskaja (1915–1998) became a philologist. Anna died in 1975 and was interred in the columbarium of Moscow's Novodevichy Cemetery (New Territory, Columbarium, section 118) where her husband and daughter are also interred.

== A musical family ==
Luboshutz's sister Lea was a celebrated violinist who emigrated to the United States and taught at the Curtis Institute of Music. Her brother Pierre Luboshutz formed a well-known duo-piano team with his wife Genia Nemenoff. Her nephew, Boris Goldovsky, started his career as a pianist but became an opera impres ario and teacher. Two grand nephews, Andrew and Thomas Wolf, also had careers in music.

== Sources ==
- Wolf, Thomas, The Nightingale’s Sonata: The Musical Odyssey of Lea Luboshutz, New York and London: Pegasus Books, 2019. ISBN 978-1-64313-067-5
- Goldovsky, Boris and Curtis Cate, My Road to Opera, Boston: Houghton Mifflin Company, 1979
- Luboshitz, Anna, “Devotion to Art” from “Muzykalnaya Zhizn” (Musical Life), Moscow: 14 November 1969
- Luboshutz, Lea, unpublished memoir dated 1936; A later version titled “LUBO: Four Generations of Music,” is undated
- Российская Портретная Галерея: Любошиц Анна Сауловна (1887-1975) (accessed on 15 July 2017).
- Novodevichy Cemetery: Любошиц Анна Сауловна (1887-1975) (accessed on 15 July 2017).
- ЛЮБОШИЦ (accessed on 15 July 2017).
