= Vladimir Horowitz – The Complete Original Jacket Collection =

Vladimir Horowitz - The Complete Original Jacket Collection

Box set by Vladimir Horowitz
- Released: December 1, 2009
- Recorded: 1928–1989
- Genre: Classical
- Label: Sony/BMG Masterworks
- Producer: Jon Samuels

Professional ratings
Review scores
| Source | Rating |
|---|---|
| The Guardian | |

Vladimir Horowitz – The Complete Original Jacket Collection is a 70 CD boxed set featuring many of the recordings of the pianist Vladimir Horowitz. The collection contains recordings from 1928 to his final recording session just four days before his death in 1989. Horowitz's recordings for RCA Red Seal and Columbia Masterworks/Sony Classical are included in the set. Recordings that Horowitz made for RCA's European affiliate, His Master's Voice, are not included. Nor are the recordings he made with Deutsche Grammophon from 1985 to 1989. It is one of the largest issues in the Original Jacket Collection series, and supersedes two smaller Original Jacket issues of Horowitz material.

== Overview ==
The box includes 70 CDs, all of which are stored in individual sleeves. Also included is a 200-page booklet which includes track listings, recording dates, an essay by producer Jon Samuels, and a chronology of Horowitz's life. The original LP album format is used along with the original album front and back covers and content sequencing. Liner notes are included only in cases where they appeared on the back covers of the original LPs.

Horowitz's first audio recordings were made on 78rpm disks. After the LP came into use in the late 1940s, all of Horowitz's recordings were issued in this format. In addition, until the early 1950s, some of Horowitz's recordings were issued on 78 rpm, 45 rpm, and LP. Many, but not all, of the pianist's older recordings were transferred to LP.

Those 78 rpm recordings which were never issued on LP are contained on a separate disc with newly created cover art. Several of the recordings which postdate the demise of the LP use the original CD covers instead of LP covers. The set also contains two previously unissued recitals: March 5, 1951, at Carnegie Hall; and November 12, 1967, at Whitman Auditorium, Brooklyn College.

The recordings from 1959 onward are in stereophonic sound, and from 1981 onward the recordings were made digitally. Previously issued material uses the best existing transfers, while the new material is newly remastered.

On October 1, 2010 - the 107th anniversary of Horowitz's birth - The Complete Original Jacket Collection won Gramophone's award for best CD reissue.

== Contents ==
| Disc No. | Original LP catalog No. | Album details | Recording year(s) | Record label |
|---|---|---|---|---|
| 1 | LM-1014 | Mussorgsky: Pictures at an Exhibition | 1947 | RCA Victor Red Seal |
| 2 | LM-1016 | Prokofiev & Kabalevsky: Prokofiev: Sonata No. 7, Op. 83; Kabalevsky: Sonata No. 3 | 1945–1947 | RCA Victor Red Seal |
| 3 | LM-1027 | Beethoven & Mozart: Beethoven: Sonata in C-sharp Minor, Op. 27, No. 2 "Moonlight"; Mozart: Sonata in F Major, K. 332 | 1946–1947 | RCA Victor Red Seal |
| 4 | LM-1109 | Schumann & Chopin: Schumann: Kinderszenen, Op. 15; Chopin: Seven Mazurkas | 1949 / 1950 | RCA Victor Red Seal |
| 5 | LM-1113 | Chopin & Barber: Chopin: Sonata in B-flat Minor, Op. 35; Barber: Sonata, Op. 26 | 1950 | RCA Victor Red Seal |
| 6 | LCT-1012 | Tchaikovsky: Piano Concerto in B-flat Minor, Op. 23: NBC Symphony Orchestra / Arturo Toscanini, Conductor | 1941 | RCA Victor Red Seal |
| 7 | LM-1137 | Chopin: Chopin: Andante Spianato & Grand Polonaise in E-flat Major, Op. 22 / Waltzes, Op. 34, No. 2 & Op. 64, No. 2/ Mazurka in F Minor, Op. 7, No. 3 / Polonaise in A-flat Major, Op. 53 / | 1945–1947 | RCA Victor Red Seal |
| 8 | LM-106 | Brahms: Sonata in D Minor for Violin and Piano, Op. 108: Nathan Milstein, Violinist | 1950 | RCA Victor Red Seal |
| 9 | LM-1025 | Brahms: Piano Concerto in B-flat Major, Op. 83: NBC Symphony Orchestra / Arturo Toscanini, Conductor | 1940 | RCA Victor Red Seal |
| 10 | LM-1171 | Horowitz Encores: Horowitz: Variations on a Theme from Bizet’s Carmen; Mussorgsky: By the Water (arr. Horowitz); Bach – Busoni: Chorale Prelude BWV599 'Nun komm, der Heiden Heiland'; Mozart: Rondo alla turca from Sonata, K. 331; Schumann: Traumerai; Mendelssohn: Songs without Words: “Elegie”, Op. 85, No. 4; “Spring Song”, Op. 62, No. 6; Debussy: Serenade for the Doll; Prokofiev: Toccata, Op. 11 | 1946–1947 | RCA Victor Red Seal |
| 11 | LM-1178 | Rachmaninoff: Piano Concerto No. 3 in D Minor, Op. 30: RCA Victor Symphony Orchestra / Fritz Reiner, Conductor | 1951 | RCA Victor Red Seal |
| 12 | LM-1235 | Chopin & Liszt: Chopin: Sonata in B-flat Minor, Op. 35 / Ballade in G Minor, Op. 23 / Nocturne, Op. 15, No. 2; Liszt: Au bord d’une source / Hungarian Rhapsody No. 6 in D-flat Major | 1947–1950 | RCA Victor Red Seal |
| 13 | LM-1718 | Beethoven: Piano Concerto in E-flat Major, Op. 73 “Emperor”: RCA Victor Symphony Orchestra / Fritz Reiner, Conductor | 1952 | RCA Victor Red Seal |
| 14 | LM-1707 | Chopin: Ballade in A-flat Major, Op. 47 / Ballade in F Minor, Op. 52 / Etude in E Major, Op. 10, No. 3 / Impromptu in A-flat Major, Op. 29 / Nocturne in F Minor, Op. 55, No. 1 / Scherzo in B Minor, Op. 20 | 1949–1952 | RCA Victor Red Seal |
| 15 | LM-9021 | Mendelssohn & Liszt: Mendelssohn: Variations serieuses, Op. 54 / Wedding March & Variations (arr. Liszt – Horowitz); Liszt: Valse Oubliee No. 1 / Sonetto del Petrarcha No. 104 / Racokzy March | 1946–1951 | RCA Victor Red Seal |
| 16a & 16b | LM-6014 | 25th Anniversary Recital: Schubert: Sonata in B-flat Major, D. 960; Chopin: Nocturne in E Minor, Op. 72, No. 1 / Scherzo in B Minor, Op. 20 / Waltz in A Minor, Op. 34, No. 2; Scriabin: Sonata No. 9, Op. 68 “Black Mass” / Etude in B-flat Minor, Op. 8, No. 11 / Etude in C-sharp Minor, Op. 42, No. 5; Liszt: Hungarian Rhapsody No. 2; Debussy: Serenade for the Doll; Prokofiev: Precipitato from Sonata No. 7, Op. 83 | 1953 | RCA Victor Red Seal |
| 17 | LM-1902 | Horowitz plays Clementi: Sonata in G Minor, Op. 34, No. 2 / Sonata in F Minor, Op. 14, No. 3 / Sonata in F-sharp Minor, Op. 26, No. 2 | 1954 | RCA Victor Red Seal |
| 18 | LM-2005 | Horowitz plays Scriabin: Sonata in F-sharp Minor, Op. 23; 16 Preludes | 1955 | RCA Victor Red Seal |
| 19 | LM-2009 | Beethoven: Moonlight and Waldstein Sonatas: Sonata in C-sharp Minor, Op. 27, No. 2 "Moonlight" / Sonata in C Major, Op. 53 "Waldstein" | 1956 | RCA Victor Red Seal |
| 20 | LM-1957 | Horowitz in Recital: Schumann: Variations on a theme by Clara Wieck; Scarlatti: Sonata in E Major, K. 380; Chopin: Mazurka in B-flat Minor, Op. 24, No. 4 / Polonaise Fantasie, OP. 61; Haydn: Sonata No. 62 in E-flat Major; Moszkowski: Etincelles, Op. 36, No. 6; Scriabin: Preludes Op. 11, No. 5 and Op. 22, No. 1; Sousa: The Stars and Stripes Forever (arr. Horowitz) | 1951 / 1956 | RCA Victor Red Seal |
| 21 | LM-2137 | Horowitz plays Chopin: Scherzos: B-flat Minor, Op. 31; C-sharp Minor, Op. 39; Nocturnes: B Major, Op. 9, No. 3; F Major, Op. 15, No. 1; C-sharp Minor, Op. 27, No. 1; E-flat Major, Op. 9, No. 2; Barcarolle, Op. 60 | 1957 | RCA Victor Red Seal |
| 22 | LM-2319 | Tchaikovsky: Piano Concerto in B-flat Minor, Op. 23: NBC Symphony Orchestra / Arturo Toscanini, Conductor | 1943 | RCA Victor Red Seal |
| 23 | LM-2357 | Mussorgsky: Pictures at an Exhibition | 1951 | RCA Victor Red Seal |
| 24 | LSC-2366 | Beethoven Sonatas: Sonata in D Major, Op. 10, No. 3 / Sonata in F Minor, Op. 57 “Appassionata” | 1959 | RCA Victor Red Seal |
| 25a & 25b | LD-7021 | The Horowitz Collection: Czerny: Variation on a Theme by Rode La Ricordanza; Mozart: Sonata in F Major, K. 332; Clementi: Rondo from Sonata in B-flat Major, Op. 24, No. 2; Schumann: Variations on a Theme by Clara Wieck / Träumerei; Mendelssohn: Songs without Words: Elegie, Op. 85, No. 4; Spring Song, Op. 62, No. 6; Shepherd’s Complaint, Op. 67, No. 5; Chopin: Andante Spianato and Grand Polonaise in E-flat Major, Op. 22; Scriabin: Sonata No. 9, Op. 68 “Black Mass”; Barber: Sonata, Op. 26; Prokofiev: Sonata No. 7, Op. 83; Moszkowski: Etude in A-flat Major, Op. 72, No. 11; Saint-Saens: Danse Macabre (arr. Liszt – Horowitz) | 1942–1953 | RCA Victor Red Seal |
| 26 | LM-2993 | The Young Horowitz: Kabalevsky: Sonata No. 3; Tchaikovsky: Dumka, Op. 59; Scarlatti – Tausig: Capriccio; Chopin: Mazurka, Op. 30, No. 4 / Waltz, Op. 64, No. 2; Liszt: Paganini Etude in E-flat Major; Debussy: Serenade for the Doll; Horowitz: Dance Excentrique; Dohnanyi: Concert Etude (Capriccio), Op. 28, No. 6 | 1928–1947 | RCA Victor Red Seal |
| 27 | VIC-1605 | The Great Horowitz plays Favorite Chopin Ballade in G Minor, Op. 23 / Waltz, Op. 64, No. 2 / Impromptu in A-flat Major, Op. 29 / Nocturne in E-flat Major, Op. 9, No. 2 / Etude in C-sharp Minor, Op. 10, No. 4 / Scherzo in B Minor, Op. 20 / Mazurka, Op. 50, No. 3 / Andante Spianato and Grand Polonaise in E-flat Major, Op. 22 | 1946–1953 | RCA Victor Red Seal |
| 28 | VICS-1649 | Great Romantic Piano Favorites: Schubert: Impromptu, D. 899, No. 3 (arr. Von Bulow); Liszt: Valse oubliee; Mendelssohn: Songs without Words: Elegie, Op. 85, No. 4; Spring Song, Op. 62, No. 6; Shepherd’s complaint, Op. 67, No. 5; Chopin: Nocturne, Op. 15, No. 2 / Mazurka in F Minor, Op. 7, No. 3; Brahms: Intermezzo, Op. 117, No. 2 / Waltz in A-flat, Op. 39, No. 15; Liszt: Funérailles | 1946–1957 | RCA Victor Red Seal |
| 29 | ARL1-1766 | The Horowitz Concerts: 1975-1976: Schumann: Sonata in F Minor, Op. 14 (Concerto without Orchestra); Scriabin: Sonata No. 5, Op. 53 | 1976 | RCA Red Seal |
| 30 | ARL1-2548 | Golden Jubilee Recital (The Horowitz Concerts: 1977-1978): Liszt: Sonata in B Minor; Faure: Impromptu in F sharp Minor, Op. 102 / Nocturne in B Minor, Op. 119 | 1976 | RCA Red Seal |
| 31 | CRL1-2633 | Golden Jubilee Concert: Rachmaninoff: Piano Concerto in D Minor, Op. 30; New York Philharmonic / Eugene Ormandy, Conductor | 1978 | RCA Red Seal |
| 32 | ARL1-3433 | The Horowitz Concerts: 1978-1979: Schumann: Humoreske, Op. 20; Rachmaninoff: Barcarolle, Op. 10, No. 3 / Humoresque, Op. 10, No. 5; Liszt: Consolation in D-flat Major / Mephisto Waltz No. 1 | 1979 | RCA Red Seal |
| 33 | ARL1-3775 | The Horowitz Concerts: 1979-1980: Schumann: Fantasiestücke, Op. 111 / Nachtstücke, Op. 23, No. 3 & 4; Mendelssohn: Scherzo a capriccio; Rachmaninoff: Sonata in B-flat Minor, Op. 36 | 1980 | RCA Red Seal |
| 34 | ARC1-4585 | Horowitz at the Met: Scarlatti: Six Sonatas; Chopin: Ballade in F Minor, Op. 52 / Waltz in A-flat Major, Op. 69, No. 1; Liszt: Ballade in B Minor, S. 171; Rachmaninoff: Prelude in G Minor, Op. 23, No. 5 | 1981 | RCA Red Seal |
| 35 | ARL1-4322 | Horowitz on Tour: 1979-1980: Clementi: Sonata quasi Concerto in C Major, Op. 33, No. 3; Chopin: Barcarolle, Op. 50 / Etude in C-sharp Minor, Op. 25, No. 7 / Etude in G-flat Major, Op. 10, No. 5 “Black Keys”; Rachmaninoff: Prelude in G Major, Op. 32, No. 5 / Moment Musicale in E-flat Minor, Op. 16, No. 2 / Polka de WR | 1977–1980 | RCA Red Seal |
| 36 | ARC1-4572 | Horowitz in London: Traditional: God Save the Queen; Chopin: Polonaise-Fantasie, Op. 61 / Ballade in G Minor, Op. 23; Schumann: Kinderszenen, Op. 15; Scriabin: Etude in D-sharp Minor, Op. 8, No. 12 | 1982 | RCA Red Seal |
| 37 | | Horowitz (Compilation of recordings never issued on LP): Scarlatti: Six Sonatas; Chopin: Nocturne, Op. 72, No. 1 / Mazurka in A Minor, Op. 17, No. 4 /; Liszt: Valse oubliee; Moszkowski: Etude in F Major, Op. 72, No. 6; Mendelssohn: Song without Words, “May Breezes”, Op. 62, No. 1; Horowitz: Variations on a Theme from Bizet’s Carmen (1928 & 1957 recordings); Sousa: The Stars and Stripes Forever | 1930–1975 | RCA Red Seal |
| 38 | KS-6371 | Columbia Records presents Vladimir Horowitz: Chopin: Sonata in B-flat Minor, Op. 35; Rachmaninoff: Etude-Tableaux in C Major, Op. 33, No. 2 / Etude-Tableaux in E-flat Minor, Op. 39, No. 5; Schumann: Arabeske, Op. 18; Liszt: Hungarian Rhapsody No. 19 in D Minor, S. 244, No. 19 (arr. Horowitz) | 1962 | Columbia Masterworks |
| 39 | MS-6411 | The Sound of Horowitz: Schumann: Kinderszenen, Op. 15 / Toccata, Op. 7; Scarlatti: Sonata in E Major, K. 531 / Sonata in A Major, K. 322 / Sonata in G Major, K. 455; Schubert: Impromptu in G-flat Major, D. 899, No. 3; Scriabin: Poeme in F-sharp Major, Op. 32, No. 2 / Etude in C-sharp Minor, Op. 2, No. 1 / Etude in D-sharp Minor, Op. 8, No. 12 | 1962 | Columbia Masterworks |
| 40 | MS-6541 | Horowitz in his first recordings of...: Beethoven: Sonata in C Minor, Op. 13 "Pathetique"; Debussy: Three Preludes from Book II; Chopin: Etude in C Minor, Op. 10, No. 12 "Revolutionary" / Etude in C-sharp Minor, Op. 25, No. 7; Chopin: Scherzo in B Minor, Op. 20 | 1963 | Columbia Masterworks |
| 41 | MS-6658 | Horowitz plays Scarlatti: Scarlatti: Sonatas K. 162, K. 474, K. 198, K. 491, K. 481, K. 39, K. 547, K. 197, K. 25, K. 52, K. 201, K. 303 | 1964 | Columbia Masterworks |
| 42a & 42b | M2S-728 | An Historic Return: Horowitz at Carnegie Hall A recording of his first concert in twelve years.: Bach – Busoni: Toccata in C Major, BWV 564/565; Schumann: Fantasie in C major, Op. 17 / Träumerei; Scriabin: Sonata No. 9, Op. 68 “Black Mass” / Poeme in F-sharp Major, Op. 32 / Etude in C-sharp Minor, Op. 2, No. 1; Chopin: Mazurka in C-sharp Minor, Op. 30, No. 4 / Etude in F Major, Op. 10, No. 8 / Ballade in G Minor, Op. 23; Debussy: Serenade for the Doll; Moszkowski: Etude in A-flat Major, Op. 72, No. 11 | 1965 | Columbia Masterworks |
| 43a & 43b | M2S-757 | Horowitz in Concert The 1966 Carnegie Hall recitals: Haydn: Sonata No. 23 in F Major; Schumann: Blumenstücke, Op. 19; Scriabin: Sonata No. 10, Op. 70; Debussy: L'isle joyeuse; Mozart: Sonata in A Major, K. 331; Chopin: Nocturne in E Minor, Op. 72, No. 1 / Mazurka in B Minor, Op. 33, No. 4; Liszt: Vallee d’Obermann | 1966 | Columbia Masterworks |
| 44 | MS-7106 | Horowitz on Television: Chopin: Ballade in G Minor, Op. 23 / Nocturne in F Minor, Op. 55, No. 1 / Polonaise in F-sharp Minor, Op. 44; Scarlatti: Sonata in E major, K. 380 / Sonata in G major, K. 55; Schumann: Arabeske, Op. 18 / Träumerei; Scriabin: Etude in D-sharp Minor, Op. 8, No. 12; Horowitz: Variations on a Theme from Bizet’s Carmen | 1968 | Columbia Masterworks |
| 45 | MS-7264 | Horowitz - Schumann: Schumann: Variations on a Theme by Clara Wieck / Kreisleriana, Op. 16 | 1969 | Columbia Masterworks |
| 46 | M-30464 | Horowitz plays Rachmaninoff: Sonata in B-flat Minor, Op. 36 / Prelude in G-sharp Minor, Op. 32, No. 12 / Moment Musicale in B Minor, Op. 16, No. 3 / Etude – Tableaux in E-flat Minor, Op. 33, No. 6 / Etude – Tableaux in C Major, Op. 33, No. 2 / Etude – Tableaux in D Major, Op. 39, No. 9 | 1967–1968 | Columbia Masterworks |
| 47 | M-30643 | Horowitz plays Chopin: Polonaise Fantasie, Op. 61 / Mazurka in A Minor, Op. 17, No. 4 / Etude in G-flat Major, Op. 10, No. 4 “Black Key” / Introduction & Rondo in E-flat Major, Op. 16 / Waltz in A Minor, Op. 34, No. 2 / Polonaise in A-flat Major, Op. 53 | 1966 / 1971 | Columbia Masterworks |
| 48 | M-31620 | Horowitz plays Scriabin: Album Leaf, Op. 45, No. 1 / Etude in F-sharp Minor, Op. 8, No. 2 / Etude in B-flat Minor, Op. 8, No. 11 / Etude in D-flat Major, Op. 8, No. 10 / Etude in A-flat Major, Op. 8, No. 8 / Etude in F-sharp Major, Op. 42, No. 3 / Etude in F-sharp Major, Op. 42, No. 4 / Etude in C-sharp Minor, Op. 42, No. 5 / Sonata No. 10, Op. 70 / Poèmes, Op. 69: Nos. 1 & 2 / Vers la flamme, Op. 72 | 1966 / 1972 | Columbia Masterworks |
| 49 | M-32342 | Beethoven: Moonlight Sonata / Schubert: Impromptus: Beethoven: Sonata in C-sharp Minor, Op. 27, No. 2 "Moonlight"; Schubert: Impromptu in A-flat Major, D. 899, No. 4 / Impromptu in F Minor, D. 935, No. 1 / Impromptu in A-flat Major, D. 935, No. 2 / Impromptu in E-flat Major, D. 899, No. 2 | 1972–1973 | Columbia Masterworks |
| 50 | M-31381 | Beethoven: Appassionata & Waldstein Sonatas: Sonata in F Minor, Op. 57 "Appassionata" / Sonata in C Major, Op. 53 "Waldstein" | 1972 | Columbia Masterworks |
| 51 | M-32932 | New Recordings of Chopin: Mazurka in F-sharp Minor, Op. 59, No. 3 / Mazurka in C-sharp Minor, Op. 50, No. 3 / Mazurka in D-flat Major, Op. 30, No. 3 / Mazurka in F Minor, Op. 7, No. 3 / Mazurka in E Minor, Op. 41, No. 2 / Mazurka in D Major, Op. 33, No. 2 / Etude in C-sharp Minor, Op. 10, No. 4 / Etude in E Major, Op. 10, No. 3 / Etude in C Minor, Op. 10, No. 12 / Waltz in C-sharp Minor, Op. 64, No. 2 / Polonaise in A Major, Op. 40, No. 1 | 1968 / 1972-1973 | Columbia Masterworks |
| 52a & 52b | M2-34256 | Concert of the Century In Celebration of the 85th Anniversary of Carnegie Hall: Beethoven: Leonore Overture, No. 3, Op. 72a; New York Philharmonic / Leonard Bernstein, Conductor; Tchaikovsky: Pezzo elegiaco from Piano Trio in A minor, Op. 50; Vladimir Horowitz, Pianist / Isaac Stern, Violin / Mstislav Rostropovich, Cello; Rachmaninoff: Andante from Sonata for cello and piano in G minor, Op. 19; Mstislav Rostropovich, Cello / Vladimir Horowitz, Pianist; Schumann: Dichterliebe, Op. 48; Dietrich Fischer-Dieskau, Baritone / Vladimir Horowitz, Pianist; Bach: Concerto for 2 violins, strings & continuo in D minor, BWV 1043; Isaac Stern, Violin / Yehudi Menuhin, Violin / New York Philharmonic / Leonard Bernstein, Conductor; Tchaikovsky: Pater Noster, from Liturgy of St John Chrysostom, Op. 41; Oratorio Society / Lyndon Woodside, Conductor; Handel: Hallelujah chorus from Messiah, HWV 56; New York Philharmonic / Oratorio Society / Lyndon Woodside, Conductor / Vladimir Horowitz, Isaac Stern, Leonard Bernstein, Yehudi Menuhin, Mstislav Rostropovich, Dietrich Fischer-Dieskau, Assisting Vocalists | 1976 | Columbia Masterworks |
| 53a & 53b | | Horowitz (Compilation of posthumously issued Columbia Recordings): Scarlatti: Sonata in G Major, K. 547 / Sonata in B Minor, K. 197 / Sonata in F-sharp Minor, K. 25 / Sonata in D Minor, K. 5 / Sonata in G Major, K. 201 / Sonata in C Minor, K. 303 / Sonata in F-sharp Major, K. 319 / Sonata in G Major, K. 260; Bach-Busoni: Chorale Prelude “Ich ruf zu dir, Herr Jesu Christ” BWV 639+; Haydn: Sonata No. 48 in C Major; Clementi: Rondo from Sonata in E-flat Major, Op. 12, No. 2 / Adagio Sostenuto in F major, Op. 44 Book 1, No. 14, from Gradus ad Parnassum / Rondo from Sonata in B-flat Major, Op. 25, No. 3 / Adagio from Sonata in A major, Op. 50, No. 1; Beethoven: Sonata in A Major, Op. 101; Mendelssohn: Etude in A Minor, Op. 104b, No. 3; Chopin: Etude in A-flat Major, from Trois Nouvelles etudes / Etude No. 6 in E flat minor, Op. 10, No. 6 / Prelude in D flat major, Op. 28, No. 15; Medtner: Fairy Tales in A Major, Op. 51 No 3+; Scriabin: Feuillet d'album, Op. 58 / Etude, Op. 65, No. 3; Liszt: Consolation in E major, S. 172, No. 2 / Liszt: Scherzo and March, S. 177; Debussy: Prelude: La terrasse des audiences du clair de lune / Etude: Pour les arpèges composés; +Limited release on Christmas LP as promotional tie-in with Goodyear Tire in 1969 | 1962–1972 | Columbia Masterworks |
| 54 | | The Private Collection, Volume 1: Bach: Toccata in C Minor, BWV. 911; Clementi: Sonata in A Major, Op. 33, No. 1 / Sonata in B-flat Major, Op. 24, No. 2 Allegro con brio / Sonata in C Major, Op. 34, No. 1 Un poco andante, quasi allegretto; Mendelssohn: Song without Words in B-flat Major, Op. 67, No. 3; Chopin: Fantasy in F Minor, Op. 49 / Polonaise in C-sharp Minor, Op. 26, No. 1 / Mazurka in B Minor, Op. 30, No. 2; Liszt: Consolations, Nos. 4 and 5, S. 172; Rachmaninoff: Etude-Tableaux in C Minor, Op. 39 No.7 | 1945–1950 | RCA Victor Red Seal |
| 55 | | The Private Collection, Volume 2: Debussy: Etudes, Book I: Nos. 4, 1, & 6; Prokofiev: Intermezzo and Valse lente from the ballet Cinderella; Poulenc: Intermezzo No 2 in D-flat Major / Novelette No 1 in C Major; Kabalevsky: Preludes, Op. 38, Nos. 1, 10, 17, 3, 16, 8, 22, 24 / Sonata No. 2 in E-flat Major, Op. 45; Barber: Excursions, Op. 20, Nos. 1, 2, & 4 | 1945–1949 | RCA Victor Red Seal |
| 56a & 56b | | Horowitz ReDiscovered The Carnegie Hall recital of November 16, 1975: Schumann: Blumenstück, Op. 19 / Piano Sonata in F Minor, Op. 14 ('Concerto Without Orchestra'); Rachmaninoff: Prelude in G Major, Op. 32, No. 5 / Etude-Tableaux in E-flat Minor, Op. 39, No. 5 / Etudes-Tableaux in D Major, Op. 39, No. 9; Liszt: Valse oubliée No. 1, S. 215, No. 1 / Au Bord d'une source, S. 160; Chopin: Waltz in A Minor, Op. 34, No. 2 / Scherzo in B Minor, Op. 20; Debussy: Serenade to a Doll; Schumann: Träumerei; Moszkowski: Étincelles, Op. 36, No. 6 | 1975 | RCA Victor Red Seal |
| 57a & 57b | | Horowitz Live & Unedited The Carnegie Hall recital of May 9, 1965: Bach – Busoni: Toccata in C Major, BWV 564/565; Schumann: Fantasy in C Major, Op. 17 / Träumerei; Scriabin: Sonata No. 9, Op. 68 “Black Mass” / Poeme in F-sharp Major, Op. 32 / Etude in C-sharp Minor, Op. 2, No. 1; Chopin: Mazurka in C-sharp Minor, Op. 30, No. 4 / Etude in F Major, Op. 10, No. 8 / Ballade in G Minor, Op. 23; Debussy: Serenade for the Doll; Moszkowski: Etude in A-flat Major, Op. 72, No. 11; Schumann: Kinderszenen, Op. 15 | 1962 / 1965 | Sony Classical |
| 58 | SK-45818 | The Last Recording: Haydn: Sonata No. 49 in E flat major; Chopin: Mazurka in C minor, Op. 56, No. 3 / Nocturne E flat major, Op. 55, No. 2 / Fantasy-Impromptu in C sharp minor, Op. 66 / Etude in A-flat major, Op. 25, No. 1 / Nocturne in B major, Op. 62, No. 1; Liszt: Weinen, Klagen, Sorgen, Zagen, prelude (after J. S. Bach); Wagner-Liszt: Isolde’s Liebestod | 1989 | Sony Classical |
| 59a & 59b | | Previously unreleased recital: March 5, 1951 Carnegie Hall: Schumann: Variations on a Theme by Clara Wieck; Mozart: Sonata in B-flat Major, K. 333; Prokofiev: Sonata No. 7, Op. 83; Chopin: Polonaise in C-sharp Minor, Op. 26, No. 1 / Polonaise in A Major, Op. 44, No. 1 / Etude in E-flat Minor, Op. 10, No. 6 / Etude in C-sharp Minor, Op. 10, No. 4 / Waltz in A Minor, Op. 34, No. 2; Liszt: Valse oubliee / Hungarian Rhapsody No. 6; Scarlatti: Sonata in A Major, K. 322; Mendelssohn: Song without Words “May Breezes”, Op. 62, No. 1; Scriabin: Etude in C-sharp Minor, Op. 2, No. 1; Moszkowski: Etincelles, Op. 36, No. 6 | 1951 | RCA Victor Red Seal |
| 60a & 60b | | Previously unreleased recital: November 12, 1967 Whitman Auditorium, Brooklyn College: Beethoven: Sonata in A Major, Op. 101; Chopin: Barcarolle, Op. 61 / Nocturne in F Minor, Op. 55, No. 1 / Polonaise in F-sharp Minor, Op. 44 / Mazurka in F Minor, Op. 7, No. 3; Scarlatti: Sonata in F-sharp Major, K. 319 / Sonata in G Major, K. 260; Schumann: Arabeske, Op. 18 / Träumerei; Rachmaninoff: Etude – Tableaux in E-flat Minor, Op. 39, No. 5 / Etude in D Major, Op. 39, No. 9; Horowitz: Variations on a Theme from Bizet's Carmen | 1967 | Columbia Masterworks |
