= Original Jacket Collection =

The Original Jacket Collection is a classical music boxed set reissue series undertaken by Sony Classical.

== Format ==
Compact Discs in the series mostly replicate the content of the original LP albums. In addition to the musical programming, the original LP front and back covers are duplicated. Most Original Jacket boxes contain ten CDs. Exceptions have included a 13-CD set of Mahler, Brucker, and Wagner conducted by Bruno Walter, and 70 and 80-CD sets for Vladimir Horowitz and Glenn Gould, respectively.

In 2010, the series name was changed to Original Album Collection.

== Issues in the series ==
The sets have been issued since the series inception.

No. of Discs	Set Details	Recording Year(s)	Original Record Label
9 CDs + 1 Enhanced CD	Glenn Gould plays Bach Disc 1: Goldberg Variations, BWV 988 (1955 recording); Disc 2: Partitas Nos. 5 in G major, BWV 829; Partita No. 6 in E minor, BWV 830; Well Tempered Clavier, Book II: Prelude and Fugue in F♯ minor, BWV 883; Prelude and Fugue in E major, BWV 878; Disc 3: Italian Concerto in F major, BWV 971; Partita No. 1 in B♭ major, BWV 825 / Partita No. 2 in C minor, BWV 826; Disc 4: The Art of the Fugue, BWV 1080; Disc 5: Well Tempered Clavier, Book I, Nos. 1–13 BWV 846–858; Discs 6–9: Well Tempered Clavier, Book I Nos. 14–16, BWV 859–861; Two-Part Inventions; Three Part Inventions; Toccatas; Disc 10 – Enhanced multimedia CD		Columbia Masterworks
80	The Complete Original Jacket Collection Gould's complete recordings for Columbia Masterworks	1955–1982	Columbia Masterworks
9 + 1 CD-ROM	Stravinsky Conducts Stravinsky Disc 1: Le Sacre du Printemps; Disk 2: The Firebird (Compete ballet); Disk 3: Symphony of Psalms; Symphony in C; Disk 4: Firebird Suite; Petruska Suite; Disk 5: Fanfare for a New Theater; The Owl and the Pussy-cat; Movements for piano and orchestra; Septet; Anthem: The Dove Descending Breaks the Air; Double Canon; Epitaphium für das Grabmal des Prinzen Max Egon zu Fürstenberg; Elegy for J. F. K.; A Sermon, a Narrative & a Prayer; Disk 6: L'histoire du soldat; Pulcinella; Disk 7: Præludium, for jazz band; Pastorale; Ragtime for 11 instruments; Octet for wind instruments; Tango for chamber orchestra; Concertino for 12 instruments; Ebony Concerto, for clarinet & jazz band (Benny Goodman, clarinet); Disk 8: The Star-Spangled Banner; Songs for voice, flute, harp & guitar; Russian Peasant Songs; Renard; King of the Stars; Babel; Ave Maria; Credo; Pater Noster; Choral-Variations “Von Himmel hoch”; Disc 9: Fireworks (Feu D'artifice), Op. 4; Ode, elegiacal chant for orchestra; Norwegian Moods; Circus Polka; Ebony Concerto; Russian Maiden's Song (Parasha's Aria)		Columbia Masterworks
10	Vladimir Horowitz Columbia Recordings Columbia Records presents Vladimir Horowitz: Chopin: Sonata in B♭ minor, Op. 35; Rachmaninoff: Etude-Tableaux in C major, Op. 33, No. 2 / Etude-Tableaux in E♭ minor, Op. 39, No. 5; Schumann: Arabeske, Op. 18; Liszt: Hungarian Rhapsody No. 19 in D minor, S. 244, No. 19 (arr. Horowitz); The Sound of Horowitz: Schumann: Kinderszenen, Op. 15 / Toccata, Op. 7; Scarlatti: Sonata in E major, K. 531 / Sonata in A major, K. 322 / Sonata in G major, K. 455; Schubert: Impromptu in G♭ major, D. 899, No. 3; Scriabin: Poeme in F♯ major, Op. 32, No. 2 / Etude in C♯ minor, Op. 2, No. 1 / Etude in D♯ minor, Op. 8, No. 12; Horowitz in his first recordings of…: Beethoven: Sonata in C minor, Op. 13 "Pathetique"; Debussy: Three Preludes from Book II; Chopin: Etude in C minor, Op. 10, No. 12 "Revolutionary" / Etude in C♯ minor, Op. 25, No. 7; Chopin: Scherzo in B minor, Op. 20; Horowitz plays Scarlatti: Scarlatti: Sonatas K. 162, K. 474, K. 198, K. 491, K. 481, K. 39, K. 547, K. 197, K. 25, K. 52, K. 201, K. 303; An Historic Return: Horowitz at Carnegie Hall A recording of his first concert in twelve years. (2 CDs): Bach – Busoni: Toccata in C major, BWV 564/565; Schumann: Fantasy in C major, Op. 17 / Träumerai; Scriabin: Sonata No. 9, Op. 68 “Black Mass” / Poeme in F♯ major, Op. 32 / Etude in C♯ minor, Op. 2, No. 1; Chopin: Mazurka in C♯ minor, Op. 30, No. 4 / Etude in F major, Op. 10, No. 8 / Ballade in G minor, Op. 23; Debussy: Serenade for the Doll; Moszkowski: Etude in A♭ major, Op. 72, No. 11; Horowitz – Schumann: Schumann: Variations on a Theme by Clara Wieck / Kreisleriana, Op. 16; Horowitz plays Rachmaninoff: Sonata in B♭ minor, Op. 36 / Prelude in G♯ minor, Op. 32, No. 12 / Moment Musicale in B minor, Op. 16, No. 3 / Etude – Tableaux in E♭ minor, Op. 33, No. 6 / Etude – Tableaux in C major, Op. 33, No. 2 / Etude – Tableaux in D major, Op. 39, No. 9; Horowitz plays Chopin: Polonaise Fantasie, Op. 61 / Mazurka in A minor, Op. 17, No. 4 / Etude in G♭ major, Op. 10, No. 4 “Black Key” / Introduction & Rondo in E♭ major, Op. 16 / Waltz in A minor, Op. 34, No. 2 / Polonaise in A♭ major, Op. 53; Horowitz plays Scriabin: Album Leaf, Op. 45, No. 1 / Etude in F♯ minor, Op. 8, No. 2 / Etude in B♭ minor, Op. 8, No. 11 / Etude in D♭ major, Op. 8, No. 10 / Etude in A♭ major, Op. 8, No. 8 / Etude in F♯ major, Op. 42, No. 3 / Etude in F♯ major, Op. 42, No. 4 / Etude in C♯ minor, Op. 42, No. 5 / Sonata No. 10, Op. 70 / Poèmes, Op. 69: Nos. 1 & 2 / Vers la flamme, Op. 72	1962–1973	Columbia Masterworks
10	Vladimir Horowitz RCA Recordings (Repackaging of 1990s Red Seal & Gold Seal CDs) Clementi: Sonata in C major, (“Sonata quasi Concerto”) Op.33 No.3 / Sonata in G minor, Op.34 No.2 / Sonata in F minor, Op.13 No.6 / Sonata in F♯ minor, Op.25 No.5 / Rondo from Sonata in B♭ major, Op.24 No.2; Chopin, Volume 1: Polonaise-Fantasie, Op. 61 / Ballade in G minor, Op. 23 / Barcarolle, Op. 50 / Etude in C♯ minor, Op. 25, No. 7 / Etude in G♭ major, Op. 10, No, 5 “Black Keys” / Ballade in F minor, Op. 52 / Waltz in A♭ major, Op. 69, No. 1 “L’adieu” / Andante Spianiato and Grand Polonaise in E♭ major, Op. 22; Chopin, Volume 2: Sonata in B♭ minor, Op. 35 / Nocturnes: in E♭ major, Op. 9, No. 2; in F minor, Op. 55, No. 1 / Impromptu in A♭ major, Op. 29 / Etudes, Op. 10: No. 3 in E major; No. 4 in C♯ minor / Ballade in G minor, op. 23; Schumann: Sonata in F minor, Op. 14 (Concerto without Orchestra) / Humoreske, Op. 20 / Fantasiestücke, Op. 111 / Nachtstücke, Op. 23, Nos. 3 & 4; Scriabin: Sonatas: No. 3 in F♯ minor, Op. 23 / Sonata No. 5, Op. 53; Preludes: Op. 11, Nos. 1, 3, 9, 10, 13, 14, 16 / Op. 13, No. 6 / Op. 15, No. 2 / Op. 16, Nos. 1, 4 / Op. 27, No. 1 / Op. 48, No. 3 / Op. 51, No. 2 / Op. 59, No. 2 / Op. 67, No. 1; Etudes: Op. 8, Nos. 7, 12 / Op. 42, No. 5; 20th Century piano music: Prokofiev: Sonata No. 7 in B♭ major, Op. 83 / Toccata, Op. 11; Barber: Sonata, Op. 26; Kabalevsky: Sonata No. 3 in F major, Op. 46; Faure: Nocturne in B minor, Op. 119; Poulenc: Presto in B♭ major, FP 70; Encores: Bizet – Horowitz: Carmen Variations; Saint-Saens – Liszt – Horowitz: Danse Macabre; W. A. Mozart: Rondo alla turca (from Sonata, K. 331); Mendelssohn: Wedding March and Variations (arr. Liszt – Horowitz / Sings Without Words: Elegie, Op. 85, No. 4, Spring Song, Op. 62, No. 2, The Shepherd’s Complaint, Op. 67, No. 5 / Scherzo a capriccio, Debussy: Serenade to the Doll (from Children’s Corner Suite); Moszkowski: Etudes, Op. 72: A♭ major, No. 11, F major, No. 2 / Etincelles, Op. 36, No. 6; Chopin: Polonaise in A♭ major, Op. 53; Schumann: Träumerai; Liszt: Rakóczy March (arr. Horowitz) / Valse oubliée No. 1; Rachmaninoff: Prelude in G minor, Op. 23, No. 5; Sousa – Horowitz: The Stars and Stripes Forever; Brahms Second and Tchaikovsky First Concertos (NBC Symphony Orchestra / Arturo Toscanini, Conductor) Golden Jubilee Concert: Rachmaninoff Third Concerto; (New York Philharmonic / Eugene Ormandy, Conductor): Piano Sonata in B♭ minor, Op. 36; (1999 High Performance Remastering)	1940–1982	RCA Red Seal
70	Vladimir Horowitz – The Complete RCA, Columbia, and Sony recordings (See article for detailed contents)	1928–1989	RCA Red Seal, Columbia Masterworks, Sony Classical
10	Leonard Bernstein – Original Jacket Collection (recordings with the New York Philharmonic unless otherwise specified) Disc 1: Beethoven: Symphony No. 3 in E♭ major, Op. 55 Eroica; How a great symphony was written, Leonard Bernstein, speaker; Disc 2: Bernstein: Symphonic Dances from West Side Story / Symphonic Suite from On the Waterfront.; Disc 3: Copland: Billy the Kid / Rodeo; Disc 4: Gershwin: Rhapsody in Blue (Columbia Symphony Orchestra / Leonard Bernstein, pianist) / An American in Paris; Disc 5: Haydn: Symphony No. 82 The Bear / Symphony No. 83 The Hen; Disc 6: Ives: Symphony No. 2; Leonard Bernstein discusses Ives; Disc 7: Mahler: Symphony No. 7; Disc 8: Shostakovich: Symphony No. 5 in D minor, Op. 47; Disc 9: Sibelius: Symphony No. 5 in E♭ major, Op. 82 / Pohjola' s Daughter, Op. 49; Disc 10: Stravinsky: Le Sacre du Printemps		Columbia Masterworks
10	Bernstein Conducts Bernstein Disc 1: Overture to Candide; Symphonic Dances from West Side Story; On the Waterfront, symphonic suite; Fancy Free; Disc 2: Symphony No.1 Jeremiah; Symphony No. 2 The Age of Anxiety (1965 version) (Philippe Entremont, pianist); I Hate Music, cycle of 5 kid songs for soprano & piano; La Bonne Cuisine: 4 recipes for voice & piano; Disc 3: Symphony No. 2 The Age of Anxiety (1949 version) (Lukas Foss, pianist); Serenade (after Plato’s Symposium); Disc 4: Symphony No. 3 Kaddish; Chichester Psalms; Disc 5: Prelude, Fugue & Riffs; Dance Episodes from On the Town; Serenade (after Plato’s Symposium); Fancy Free; Disc 6: Dybbuk; Disc 7: Trouble in Tahiti; Disc 8: On the Town; Discs 9 & 10: Mass		Columbia Masterworks
10	George Szell conducts Beethoven (all recordings feature The Cleveland Orchestra with Szell unless otherwise specified): Symphonies 1–9; Overtures: Leonore 1–3, Fidelio, Egmont, Coriolan, King Stephen; The Creatures of Prometheus – Complete ballet (Louis Lane, Conductor); Mozart: Symphony K. 551		Columbia Mastwerworks
10	George Szell Plays and Conducts Mozart (all recordings feature the Cleveland Orchestra with Szell unless otherwise specified): Symphonies: K. 200, K. 319, K. 385, K. 543, K. 550, K. 551 (Stereo Versions); Symphonies: K. 543, K. 550, K. 551 (First CD release of Mono versions); Divertimento, K. 131; Sinfonia Concertante, K. 364; Serenades: K. 525, K. 320; Clarinet Concerto, K. 622 (Robert Marcellus, Clarinet); Piano Concerto, K. 503 (Leon Fleisher, Pianist); Sonatas for Violin and Piano: K. 376, K. 301, K. 304, K. 296 (George Szell, Pianist / Rafael Druian, Violin); Piano Quartets: K. 478, K. 493 (George Szell, Pianist / Budapest String Quartet); Divertimento, K. 334 (Louis Lane, Conductor); Minuet in C major (Erich Leinsdorf, Conductor); Requiem: Lacrimosa (Robert Shaw, Conductor)		Columbia Masterworks
13	Bruno Walter conducts Famous Mahler and Bruckner Symphonies Mahler: Symphony No. 1 in D major ('Titan'); Symphony No. 2 in C minor ('Resurrection'); Symphony No. 4 in G major; Symphony No. 5 in C♯ minor; Wayfarer Songs; Das Lied von der Erde; Symphony No. 9 in D major; A Working Portrait: Recording the Mahler Ninth Symphony; A Talking Portrait: Bruno Walter in Conversation; Bruckner: Symphony No. 4 in E♭ ('Romantic'), WAB 104; Symphony No. 7 in E major, WAB 107; Symphony No. 9 in D minor, WAB 109; Te Deum in C major, WAB 45; Wagner: Overture & Bacchanale to Tannhäuser; Prelude to Act I of Die Meistersinger von Nürnberg; Overture to The Flying Dutchman; Prelude to Act I & Good Friday Music to Parsifal; Overture to Act I of Lohengrin; Siegfried Idyll; Bruno Walter Rehearses the Siegfried-Idyll		Columbia Masterworks
10	Heifetz: The Original Jacket Collection Double Concertos: J. S. Bach: concerto in D minor for two violins, BWV. 1043 (New Symphony Orchestra of London / Sir Malcolm Sargent, conductor); W. A. Mozart: Sinfonia Concertante in E♭ major, K. 364 (RCA Victor Symphony Orchestra / Izler Solomon, Conductor; Brahms: concerto in A minor for Vioin and Cello (Gregor Piatigorsky, Cello / RCA Victor Symphony Orchestra / Alfred Wallenstein, Conductor); Beethoven & Mendelssohn: Beethoven: Violin Concerto in D major, Op. 61; Mendelssohn: Violin Concerto in E minor, Op. 64; (Boston Symphony Orchestra / Charles Munch, Conductor) Brahms & Tchaikovsky: Brahms: Violin Concerto in D major, Op. 77; Tchaikovsky: Violin Concerto in D major, Op. 35; (Chicago Symphony Orchestra / Fritz Reiner, Conductor) Bloch & Vieuxtemps: Bloch: Violin Concerto in G minor, Op. 26 / Scottish Fantasy, Op. 46; Vieuxtemps: Violin Concerto in A minor, Op. 37; Sibelius, Prokofiev, & Glazunov: Sibelius: Violin Concerto in D minor, Op. 47; (Chicago Symphony Orchestra / Walter Hendl, Conductor: Prokofiev: Violin Concerto in G minor, Op. 63; (Boston Symphony Orchestra / Charles Munch, Conductor): Glazunov: Violin Concerto in A minor, Op. 82; (RCA Victor Symphony Orchestra / Walter Hendl, Conductor) Korngold, Lalo, Rosza, & Waxman: Korngold: Violin Concerto; Lalo: Symphonie Espagnole; Rosza: Violin Concerto; Waxman: Carmen Fantasy; J. S. Bach (2 CDs): Sonata No. 1 in G minor, BWV 1001 / Sonata No. 2 in A minor, BWV 1003 / Sonata No. 3 in C major, BWV 1005; Partita No. 1 in B minor, BWV 1002 / Partita No. 2 in D minor, BWV 1004 / Partita No. 3 in E major, BWV 1006; Jascha Heifetz in Concert Last public concert (2 CDs) (Brooks Smith, Pianist): Franck: Sonata in A major; Richard Strauss: Sonata in E♭ major, Op. 18; Bach: Partita No. 3 in E major, BWV 1006; Bloch: Baal Shem No 02, Nigun; Debussy: La plus que lente; Rachmaninoff: Etude-Tableaux in E♭ major, Op. 33, No. 4; Falla: Nana; Kreisler: La chasse in the Style of Cartier; Ravel: Tzigane; Tedesco: Sea Murmurs		RCA Red Seal & Columbia Masterworks
10	Itzhak Perlman Disc 1: J. S. Bach: Concerto for 2 violins, strings & continuo in D minor ("Double"), BWV 1043; Vivaldi: Concerto for 3 violins, strings & continuo in F major, RV 551; Mozart: Sinfonia concertante for violin, viola & orchestra in E♭ major, K. 364 (K. 320d); Disc 2: Brahms: Sonata for violin & piano No. 1 in G major ("Regen"), Op. 78 / Sonata for violin & piano No. 2 in A major, Op. 100 / Sonata for violin & piano No. 3 in D minor, Op. 108; Disc 3: Chausson: Concert, for violin, piano & string quartet in D major, Op. 21; Disc 4: Mozart: Duo for violin & viola No. 1 in G major, K. 423 / Duo for violin & viola No. 2 in B♭ major, K. 424; Leclair: Sonata for 2 violins in F major, Op. 3, No. 4; Disc 5: Paganini: Sonata for violin & guitar in A minor (Centone di sonate, Letter A/1), MS 112, No. 1 / Sonata for violin & guitar in E minor, Op. 3/6, MS 27, No. 6 / Sonata concertata, for guitar & violin in A major, Op. 61, MS 2 / Cantabile, for violin & piano in D major, (MS 109); Giuliani: Duo Concertant for violin & guitar in E minor, Op. 25; Disc 6: Prokofiev: Sonata for violin & piano No. 1 in F minor, Op. 80 / Sonata for violin & piano No. 2 in D major, Op. 94 / Violin Concerto No. 2 in G minor, Op. 63; Disc 7: Tchaikovsky: Violin Concerto in D major, Op. 35; Dvorák: Romance for violin & orchestra in F minor, B. 39 (Op. 11); Sibelius: Violin Concerto in D minor, Op. 47; Disc 8: Lalo: Symphonie espagnole in D minor, Op. 21; Ravel: Tzigane; Disc 9: Dohnányi: Serenade for violin, viola & cello in C major, Op. 10; Beethoven: Serenade for violin, viola & cello in D major, Op. 8; Disk 10: Morricone: Nuovo Cinema Paradiso – Love Theme (for the film Cinema Paradiso); Raksin: Laura, film score (Theme); Williams: Far and Away, film score (Theme) / Schindler's List, film score (Theme) / Sabrina, film score (1995) (Theme); Hupfeld: As Time Goes By, song; Bernstein: Age of Innocence, film score (Theme); Walton: Henry V, film score (Touch her Soft Lips and Part); Chaplin: Smile (as used in the film "Modern Times" ) (spurious; by Geoffrey Persons); Barry: Out of Africa, film score (Main Title); Korngold: The Adventures of Robin Hood, film score (Marian & Robin Love Theme); Young: Stella by starlight, song (from the 1944 film "The Uninvited"); Legrand: I Will Wait for You (Je ne pourrai jamais vivre sans toi), song (from the film "The Umbrellas of Cherbourg")		RCA Red Seal
10	Eugene Ormandy Respighi: The Pines of Rome, P. 141 / The Fountains of Rome, P. 106 / Roman Festivals, P. 157; Russian Showpieces: Mussorgsky–Ravel: Pictures at an Exhibition; Rimsky-Korsakov: Scheherazade, Op. 35; Rachmaninoff: Symphony No. 2 in E minor, Op. 27 (Columbia recording with cuts) / Vocalise, Op. 34, No. 14; Tchaikovsky: Symphony No. 5 in E minor, Op. 64 / Serenade for Strings in C major, Op. 48; Bartok: Concerto for Orchestra, BB 127 / The Miraculous Mandarin (Suite), BB 82 / Two Pictures, BB. 59; (Isaac Stern, Violinist: Mendelssohn: Violin Concerto in E minor, Op. 64; Tchaikovsky: Violin Concerto in D major, Op. 35; Shostakovich: Symphony No. 1 in F minor, Op. 10 / Cello Concerto in E♭ major, Op. 107 (Mstislav Rostropovich, Cellist); Bach: Orchestral Transcriptions: / Toccata and Fugue in D minor, BWV 565 / Arioso from Concerto for harpsichord, strings & continuo in F minor, BWV 1056 / Minuet in G major BWV Anh. 114 / Musette in D major BWV Anh. 126 / Bist du bei mir, BWV 508 / March in D major BWV 122 / Ein feste Burg ist unser Gott, BWV 302 / Jesu, Joy Of Man's Desiring, BWV 147 / Fugue in G minor ('Little'), BWV 578 / Passacaglia and Fugue in C minor, BWV 582 / Prelude in E major, BWV 937 / Air on the G String, BWV 1068 / Sheep May Safely Graze, BWV 208 / Komm, süsser Tod, BWV 478 / Sleepers Awake, BWV 140; The Bach Album: Toccata, Adagio and Fuguein C major, BWV 564 / Symphony for double orchestra 'No. 26' in E♭ major, Op. 18, No. 1 / Symphony for double orchestra in D major Op. 18, No. 3 / Sinfonia in D minor, F. 65 / Concerto for violin in D major, H. 497; The Romantic Philadelphia Strings: Barber: Adagio for Strings; Mascagni: Intermezzo from Cavalleria rusticana; Sibelius: Valse Triste; Grieg: Lyric Suite; MacDowell: To a Wild Rose; Vaughan Williams: Fantasia on Greensleeves / Fantasia on a Theme by Thomas Tallis		Columbia Masterworks
10	Arthur Rubinstein: Chopin: Ballades, Mazurkas, Nocturnes, Polonaises, Scherzos, Sonatas, Waltzes, and assorted solo works from Rubinstein's stereo cycle.; Also includes 1946 monaural versions of Op. 28 Preludes and Op. 35 Sonata.	1946–1965	RCA Red Seal
11	David Geringas		Eurodisc/Ariola
15	Montserrat Caballé		RCA Red Seal
103	Jascha Heifetz – Complete Album Collection	1917–1972	RCA Red Seal & Columbia Masterworks
142	Arthur Rubinstein – The Complete Album Collection Contains all of Rubinstein's previously issued RCA recordings, plus: CD 140: Debussy: L'Isle joyeuse / La plus que lente / Preludes, Book II – No. 8, Ondine; Albeniz: Triana; Falla: el amor brujo: No. 11, Dance of Terror / The Three-Cornered Hat: Dance of the Miller's Wife; Granados: The Maiden and the Nightingale; Liszt: Harmonies Poetiques et Religieuses – No. 7, Funerailles / Valse oubliee No. l in F♯ minor / Hungarian Rhapsody No. 12 in C♯ minor; Scriabin: Nocturne for the Left-hand alone in D♭, Op. 9, No. 2; Stravinsky: Three Scenes from Petrouchka; CD 141: J. S. Bach–Busoni: Violin Partita No. 2 in D minor, BWV 1004 – Chaconne; Brahms: Piano Sonata No. 3 in F minor, Op. 5 / Intermezzo in B♭, Op. 117, No. 2 / Intermezzo in A, Op. 118, No. 2 / Intermezzo in E♭ minor, Op. 118, No. 6; Chopin: Mazurka in D, Op. 33, No. 2 / Nocturne No. 8 in D♭, Op. 27, No. 2; Schubert: Impromptu No. 4 in A♭, D. 899, No. 4, Op. 90, No. 4; CD 142: Chopin: Sonata No. 2 in B♭ minor, Op. 35, Funeral March / Prelude No. 4 in E minor, Op. 28, No. 4 / Prelude No. 8 in F♯ minor, Op. 28, No. 8 / Prelude No. 15 in D♭, Op. 28, No. 15, Raindrop Prelude No. 21 in B♭, Op. 28, No. 21 / Prelude No. 23 in F, Op. 28, No. 23 / Prelude No. 24 in D minor, Op. 28, No. 24 / Berceuse in D♭, Op. 57 / Polonaise-Fantasie in A♭, Op. 61 / Fantasie-lmpromptu in C♯ minor, Op. 66 / : Etude No. 14 in F minor, Op. 25, No. 2 / Etude No. 15 in F, Op. 25, No. 3 / Etude No. 12 in C minor, Op. 10, No. 12, Revolutionary / Polonaise No. 6 in A♭, Op. 53, Heroic; Also includes: DVD: Benefit recital for Israel; DVD: Rubinstein Remembered	1928-1976	Sony Classical
