= Onissim Goldovsky =

Russian lawyer and activist (1865–1922)

Onissim Borisovich Goldovsky (/ɡoʊlˈdɒfski/; Russian: Онисим Борисович Гольдовский; January 6, 1865 – September 7, 1922) was a Russian attorney, political philosopher and activist, author, and champion of Jewish causes. A so-called "Westerner" influenced by ideas of the French Enlightenment, he was one of the founders of the Kadet party and advocated for a constitutional democracy for Russia. Married to the author Rashel Khin, he fathered three children with the violinist Lea Luboshutz, among them the opera impresario Boris Goldovsky.

== Early life ==
Born in Vilnius, his father was a Merchant of the Second Guild. A brilliant student, Goldovsky was initially admitted to the physics and mathematics department of Moscow Imperial University (Императорский Imperatorsky) in 1883, only to switch to the Faculty of History and Philology in 1884 and, after passing all his exams that year, finally ending up in the Faculty of Law, probably at the suggestion of his uncle, the jurist Vladimir Osipovich Garkavi. Coming under the influence of the philosopher Vasili Rozanov, he helped to edit some of his writings. A brief affair with Rozanov's wife, Polina Suslova, ended in Goldovsky being denounced for his political activities and serving brief jail time. Upon completing his studies he interned with two of the most important liberal jurists of the time -- Rudolf Rudolfovich Mintslov and Alexander Ivanovich Urusov (about whom he wrote a biography). It was Urusov who introduced Goldovsky to his future wife, the writer Rashel Mironovna Khin.

== Early career and political activity ==
Goldovsky's legal career involved both defending people accused of political crimes as well as more remunerative commercial work. He represented railway investors and played a role in proposing a lucrative rail branch line for the Trans-Siberian Railway, benefiting the real estate holdings of his client, Aleksei Alexandrovich Lopukhin. At the same time, he was active in the formation of the Kadet party, advocating for constitutional democracy, women's emancipation, an end to official anti-Semitism, and, importantly, an end to the death penalty. His book, Against the Death Penalty, consisting of over 50 essays on the subject and his own world literature review, was published in 1906 to influence the actions of the first Duma, with a second edition the following year. Prior to its appearance, his wife and he moved temporarily to Paris during the 1905 revolution since, given his political activity, they considered themselves in danger.

== Jewish activity ==
For a Jew who had converted to Catholicism, Goldovsky was extremely active in Jewish affairs. His conversion was one of convenience, necessitated by that of his wife who had converted to Catholicism to get out of a loveless Jewish marriage. Since she could not marry another Jew, Goldovsky agreed to change his religion. In 1900, he recruited writers, including Émile Zola (whose work his wife had translated into Russian) and Maxim Gorky as well as artists like Leonard Pasternak to contribute to a publication to benefit indigent Jews (which was published in 1901). The only writer to turn him down was Lev Tolstoy who remarked that he was occupied with more important, global questions and the Jewish question was number 189th in importance for him. Later, he would overcome his anger and spend a pleasant evening with Tolstoy playing Beethoven piano sonatas for him (Goldovsky was an excellent pianist). In the early years of the twentieth century, he wrote his History of the Jews of Moscow which revealed patterns of Russian anti-Semitism going back centuries. The book was published in Berlin in 1906 since no Russian publisher would touch it. Goldovsky also supported Jewish playwrights and authors such as the struggling Jewish playwright Semon Solomovich Iushkevich, who modeled the hero of one of his plays on Goldovsky.

== Relationship with Lea Luboshutz ==
In 1903, Goldovsky went to a party at which the 18-year-old violin prodigy Lea Luboshutz was performing. Goldovsky offered to accompany her in a few numbers. The two fell in love and by 1908, he was living with her, the first of their three children having been born the previous year. Goldovsky continued his marriage with Khin, maintaining a room in his wife's house while living primarily with Luboshutz. With Khin, he attended political events and worked to support her theatre activities. Goldovsky and Luboshutz's apartment was a center of activity for Moscow's artistic crowd and included overnight stays from touring artists like Pablo Casals.

== Masonic Lodge ==
After the 1905 Revolution, many liberals like Goldovsky who had fled came home briefly. But their hopes were dashed by the dissolution of the First Duma and some fled once again. Others like Goldovsky, who stayed, faced increasing repression and needed to find a way to meet secretly. Masonry, with its strict membership rules and emphasis on total loyalty, was the perfect solution. A Grand Orient de France Lodge opened in St. Petersburg in 1906, followed by one in Moscow founded by Prince Sergei Dmitrievich Urusov (a distant cousin of Onissim's mentor) around November 1906 (the actual date is in dispute). Goldovsky underwent a typical rite of passage. It was there that Goldovsky planned his political work while maintaining his lucrative law practice.

== The Russian Revolution and final years ==
Goldovsky was in Saint Petersburg during the February Revolution of 1917. According to his wife's diary, he was ecstatic. But he had misread events. By the end of the year, his law practice became irrelevant and he and Luboshutz were forced to share their Moscow apartment with another family. Luboshutz now supported the family by performing in factories in exchange for food. Jewels and fancy clothes were pawned. As conditions deteriorated, they planned to emigrate but it was not easy. Taking their 13-year-old son Boris as her piano accompanist, Luboshutz departed first with plans for Onissim to follow. But the strain of conditions, including repeated questioning by the authorities and threat of imprisonment, led to a cerebral hemorrhage followed by Goldovsky's immediate death at the age of 56.

== Family ==
Goldovsky had no children with his wife, Rashel Khin. With Luboshutz, he had three children. The oldest, Yuri, became a mathematician in the Soviet Union but was killed in a mountaineering accident in 1931. The second son, Boris Goldovsky, became a successful opera producer and conductor in America. A daughter, Irina, also came to America, married, and had six children.

== Sources ==
- Wolf, Thomas, The Nightingale’s Sonata: The Musical Odyssey of Lea Luboshutz, New York and London: Pegasus Books, 2019. ISBN 978-1-64313-067-5
