= Rachel Mironovna Khin =

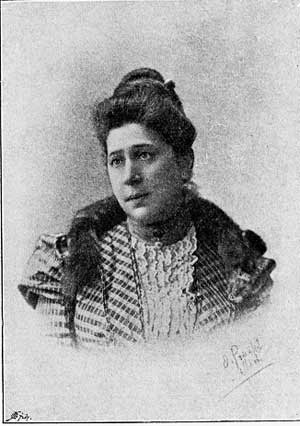
- Born: 9 March 1861; Horki, Mogilev Governorate, Russian Empire
- Died: 12 December 1928 (aged 65); Moscow, Soviet Union
- Spouse(s): Solomon Feldstein (m. 1883, divorced) Onissim Goldovsky
- Relatives: Mikhail Feldstein (son); Konstantin Efron (grandson)
- Writing career
- Pen name: R. F____stein

Rachel Mironovna Khin (Russian: Рашель Мироновна Хин; 9 March 1861 – 12 December 1928) was a Russian Jewish author, playwright, and salonnière.

== Biography ==
She was born in Gorki, Mogilev Governorate to Miron and Rebecca Khin. She was educated at the Women's Third Gymnasium in Moscow, studied medicine at Saint Petersburg, and history and literature at the Collège de France in Paris. Khin's novels and sketches first appeared in the Vyestnik Yevropy, Russkaga Mysl, Nedyelya, and Voskhod, and were later issued in book form under the titles Siluety (Moscow, 1894) and Pod Goru (ib. 1900).
