= Rafael Druian =

American violinist, conductor and music educator

- Born: January 20, 1923; Vologda, Russia
- Died: September 8, 2003 (aged 80)
- Occupations: Musician, conductor, educator
- Instrument: Violin
- Formerly of: Dallas Symphony; Minneapolis Symphony; Cleveland Orchestra; New York Philharmonic
- Spouse: Phyllis Rugg Druian

Rafael Druian (January 20, 1923 – September 8, 2003), was an American violinist, conductor and music educator. He is remembered for his tenures as concertmaster of the Dallas Symphony and Minneapolis Symphony under Antal Dorati, the Cleveland Orchestra under George Szell and the New York Philharmonic under Pierre Boulez.

== Life and career ==
=== Early career ===
Druian was born in Vologda, Russia but immigrated with his parents to Havana, Cuba as an infant. He began his formal music training there as a violinist, studying with Amadeo Roldán, the conductor of the Havana Philharmonic. At age 9, he went to Philadelphia to audition for Leopold Stokowski, who recommended him for a scholarship at the Curtis Institute of Music where he studied with Lea Luboshutz and Efrem Zimbalist, graduating in 1942. He then served in the United States Army from 1943 to 1946, playing the mellophone in the Army Band.

=== Concertmaster positions ===
- Dallas Symphony Orchestra, under Antal Doráti: 1947 – 1949
- Minneapolis Symphony Orchestra, under Antal Doráti: 1949 – 1960
- Cleveland Orchestra, under George Szell: 1960 – 1969
- New York Philharmonic, under Pierre Boulez: 1971 – 1974

=== Academic and faculty positions ===
- University of Minnesota
- Cleveland Institute of Music, Artist in Residence
- California Institute of the Arts, Associate Dean of the Music School, 1969 – 1971
- Blossom Music Festival, Kent, Ohio
- Kent State University
- State University of New York at Purchase
- University of California, San Diego, Professor of Music, 1974 – 1980
- The Hartt School
- Tanglewood "Berkshire Music Center" 1981?-1984
- Boston University, 1982? – 1989
- Curtis Institute of Music, 1990 – 2001

=== Notable students ===
- Karen Iglitzin of the Philadelphia String Quartet
- Philip Setzer of the Emerson String Quartet
- Herald Klein
- Solomiya Ivakhiv

=== Personal life ===
Druian was married to Phyllis Rugg Druian. They had two sons, Peter of Philadelphia, Pennsylvania and Greg of Portland, Oregon.

== Discography ==
- Solo with orchestra
- Wolfgang Amadeus Mozart Sinfonia Concertante, K. 364; Druian, (violin); Abraham Skernick, (viola); Cleveland Orchestra, George Szell, (conductor); Epic/Columbia/CBS/Sony, recorded Nov. 28, 1963; This record was nominated for a Grammy Award for "Best Classical Performance for Soloists with Orchestra" in 1965.
- Rimsky Korsakov "Scheherazade" featuring violin solo; with Minneapolis Symphony, Antal Dorati, conductor
- Tchaikovsky "Swan Lake" Ballet, including violin solo; Minneapolis Symphony, Antal Dorati, conductor
- Sonatas and solos with piano
- Robert Schumann Violin Sonata 1 and Johannes Brahms Violin Sonata 2; Druian (violin); John Simms, (piano); Mercury - MG50091.
- Wolfgang Amadeus Mozart Violin Sonatas, K. 301 & 296; Druian (violin), George Szell (piano) (1967)
- The following six recordings with Druian (violin) and John Simms (piano) are listed through this link:
- Ernest Bloch Violin Sonatas 1,2
- "Fritz Kreisler Favorites"; Mercury - MG50119A, MG50119B.
- George Enescu Sonata no.3; and Leoš Janáček JW VII/7;
- Schubert: Fantasy in C major/Duo Sonata/ Robert Schumann Violin Sonata no.1; Brahms Sonata no.2
- Charles Ives Violin Sonatas 2,3 and 4; Mercury - MG50096, MG50097, released in 1957.
- Quincy Porter, Bartok, Ravel Violin Sonatas

== Sources ==
- Donald Rosenburg, Rafael Druian, orchestra concertmaster in 1960s, obituary in the Cleveland Plain Dealer, September 9, 2002
- Overtones, Philadelphia: Curtis Institute of Music, vol. XVII, no. 2, Fall 2002
- Unpublished biographical notes, John Gingrich Management, Inc., [1989?]
