= Lea Luboshutz =

Russian violinist (1885–1965)

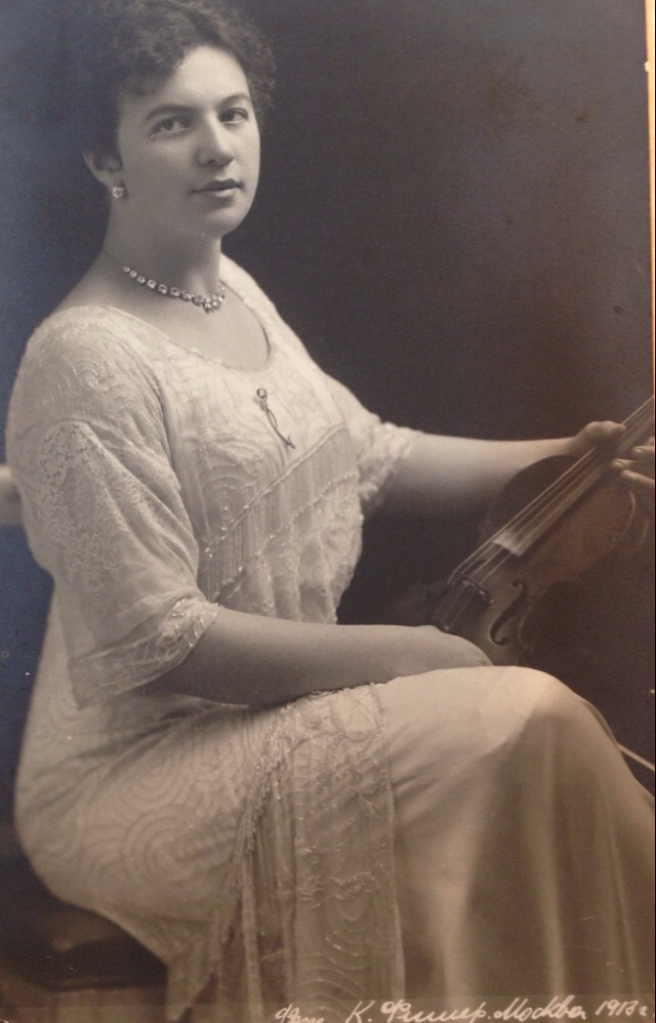

Background information
- Born: February 22, 1885; Odessa, Russian Empire
- Died: March 18, 1965 (aged 80)
- Genres: Classical
- Instrument: Violin

Lea Luboshutz (February 22, 1885 – March 18, 1965) was a Russian violinist. She had a performing career in Europe and the United States of America, settling in America and becoming a teacher at the Curtis Institute of Music in Philadelphia. She was the mother of the conductor Boris Goldovsky and the sister of the pianist Pierre Luboshutz and the cellist Anna Luboshutz.

== Early life ==
Luboshutz was born in Odessa, Russian Empire. Her first teacher was her father. Her mother supported the family by selling pianos. A child prodigy, Lea gave her first concert at the age of five and went on to study with Emil Młynarski, a protégé of Leopold Auer. When Auer came to Odessa, he was so impressed that he invited the eight-year-old child to come to study with him in Saint Petersburg, but the family could not afford to send and maintain Lea there. Two siblings came at about this time – Anna (who became a cellist) and Pierre, a pianist. Lea came to the Moscow Conservatory at age 11, on an invitation by Vasily Safonov, and ended her studies there winning the gold medal in May 1903. Her patron, Lazar Polyakov, purchased an Amati violin for her.

== Early career ==
She quickly became well established in Moscow musical circles and began to tour in Russia and eastern Europe. At the age of sixteen, she met Onissim Goldovsky, a prominent and wealthy attorney active in political circles. Though married to the writer Rashel Khin, Goldovsky established a household with Luboshutz and the couple had three children. Goldovsky nevertheless remained married to Khin for the rest of his life. The Goldovsky/Luboshutz apartment became a gathering place for musicians and theatre people – many visiting performers, including Pablo Casals, stayed there during tours to the City. During the summer of 1905, Lea went to Belgium for post-graduate studies with Eugène Ysaÿe. Meanwhile, with her brother and sister, Lea formed the Luboshutz Trio that toured throughout Russia and played at Leo Tolstoy's state funeral. Lea also performed at the court of the Romanovs and appeared regularly in Russia and Europe with the basso Fyodor Chaliapin and in concerts organized by Serge Koussevitzky. She made her first trip to the United States in 1907 but her tour was cut short by pregnancy.

== The Russian Revolution, Berlin and Paris ==
Following the Russian Revolution, Goldovsky and Luboshutz decided to emigrate and she departed, never to return. first going to Germany on a concert tour in 1921 with her 13-year-old son Boris, who served as her accompanist. Onissim Goldovsky died the next year, not having managed to leave the Soviet Union. Living as a single mother in Berlin and then in Paris, Lea toured throughout Europe and, under impresario Sol Hurok's banner, throughout the United States. There she introduced many new works to American audiences. She played the New York premiere of the first violin concerto of Serge Prokofiev, with Ernst von Dohnanyi conducting the orchestra.

== Later career in the United States ==
In 1924, she began touring internationally with the pianist Josef Hofmann, and when he was subsequently appointed to the directorship of the Curtis Institute of Music in 1927, he invited her to join the violin department, a post she held until 1945. After one of Luboshutz's Carnegie Hall appearances, another wealthy patron, Aaron Naumburg, purchased a Stradivarius violin for her (the so-called "Nightingale"). Her students included a concertmaster of the Cleveland Orchestra (Rafael Druian), seven members of the Philadelphia Orchestra, and numerous others who went on to successful careers. She was awarded an honorary doctorate by the Curtis Institute of Music in 1953.

Luboshutz died at Einstein Medical Center in Philadelphia, Pennsylvania in 1965.

== A musical family ==
Luboshutz's sister Anna became a celebrated cellist in the Soviet Union who was also a gold medal winner at the Moscow Conservatory. Her brother Pierre Luboshutz formed a well-known duo-piano team with his wife Genia Nemenoff. Her son, Boris Goldovsky, started his career as a pianist but became an opera impresario and teacher. Two grandsons, Andrew and Thomas Wolf, also had careers in music.

== Sources ==
- Wolf, Thomas, The Nightingale's Sonata: The Musical Odyssey of Lea Luboshutz, New York and London: Pegasus Books, 2019. ISBN 978-1-64313-067-5
- Goldovsky, Boris and Curtis Cate, My Road to Opera, Boston: Houghton Mifflin Company, 1979
- Luboshitz, Anna, "A Musical Life" from "Muzykalnaya Zhizn" (Musical Life), Moscow: November 14, 1969
- Overtones, Philadelphia: Curtis Institute of Music, vol. 1, no. 1, October 15, 1929
- Saleski, Gdal, Famous Musicians of a Wandering Race, New York: Bloch Publishing, 1927
- Laila Storch: Marcel Tabuteau: How do you Expect to Play the Oboe if you can't Peel a Mushroom?, Bloomington (IN): Indiana University Press, 2008
