= Solomiya Ivakhiv =

Ukrainian-born classical violinist

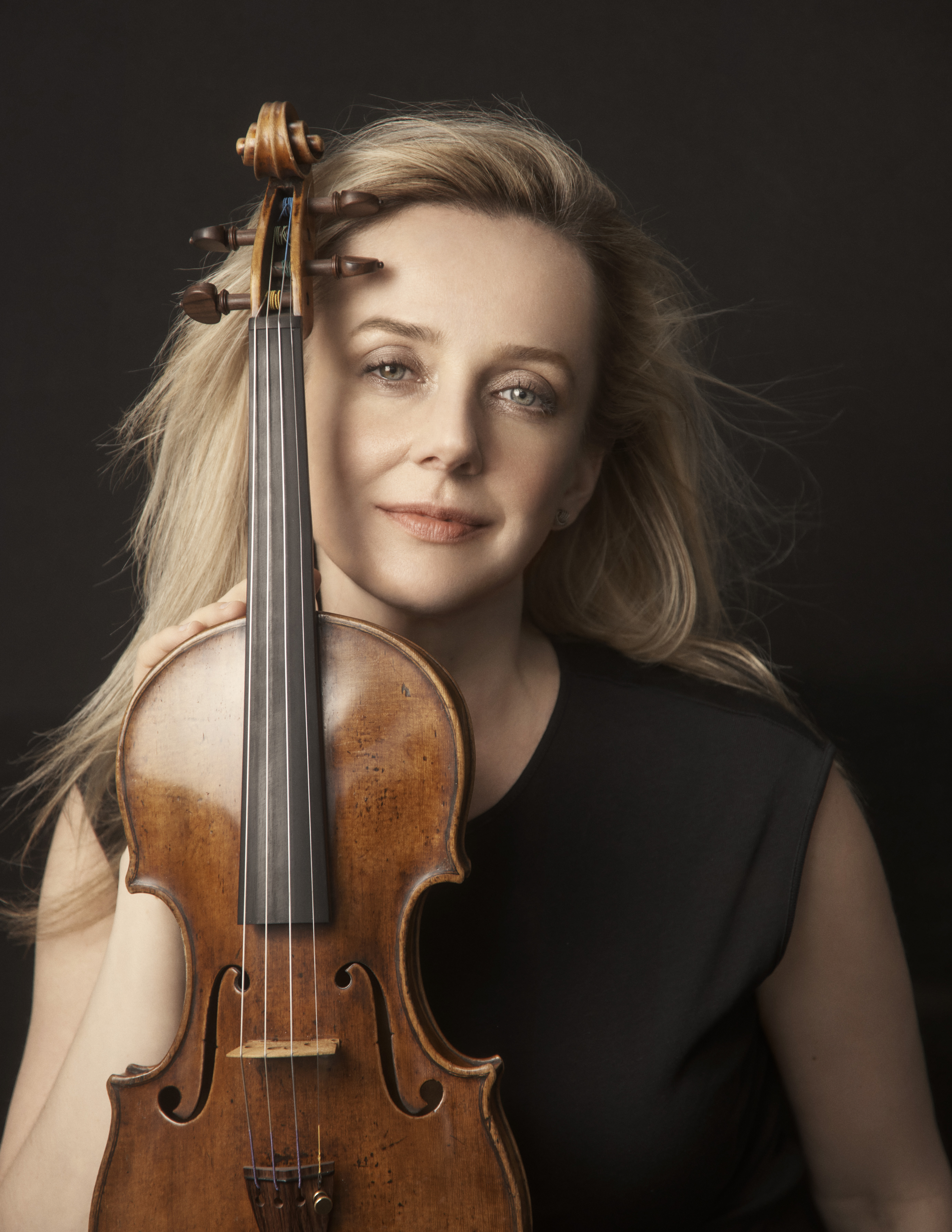

Background information
- Born: April 3, 1980 (age 46); Lviv, Ukraine
- Occupations: Violinist; music professor
- Instrument: Violin
- Education: Curtis Institute of Music; Lviv Conservatory; Stony Brook University
- Awards: Merited Artist of Ukraine 2021
- Website: solomiyaivakhiv.com

Solomiya Ivakhiv (born April 3, 1980) is a Ukrainian-born internationally performing classical violinist and Head of Strings at the University of Connecticut. She holds a Doctorate in Musical Arts and is a professor of violin at the University of Connecticut as well as the Longy School of Music of Bard College. In August 2021 she was awarded by presidential decree the title of Honored Artist of Ukraine by president Volodymyr Zelenskyy.

== Biography ==
Ivakhiv was born in Ukraine to parents who both were in the field of education. At the age of two, Ivakhiv's mother identified early signs of innate musical understanding in her daughter and by six Ivakhiv was auditioning for the Special Music School for Children with Extraordinary Abilities in Lviv, Ukraine. It was here that Ivakhiv was introduced to the violin.

She would later receive her musical education from the Lviv Academy of Music before later graduating with honors from the Curtis Institute of Music, where she studied with Joseph Silverstein, Pamela Frank and Rafael Druian, and held the title of concert master of both the Curtis Symphony Orchestra and the Tanglewood Music Center Orchestra. She earned her Master of Music degree from the M. Lysenko Music Academy in Lviv and completed her Doctorate in Musical Arts from Stony Brook University. Her teachers at Stony Brook were Philip Setzer (Emerson Quartet), Ani Kavafian (Yale University) and Gilbert Kalish (Lincoln Center Chamber Music Society).

As well as being an accomplished international performing artist, Ivakhiv maintains a position of Professor of Violin and Viola and Head of Strings. Ivakhiv has released four full-length albums with the fourth and most recent being Poems and Rhapsodies, released by Centaur on February 11, 2022.

== Musical career ==
Ivakhiv has performed solo and chamber music at Carnegie Hall, Merkin Concert Hall, CBC Glenn Gould Studio, Curtis Institute Field Concert Hall, Italian Academy in New York City, Pickman Hall in Cambridge (MA), San Jose Chamber Music Society, Philadelphia Chamber Music Society https://www.pcmsconcerts.org , Old First Concerts in San Francisco, Astoria Music Festival (Portland), M. Lysenko Collocated Hall in Kyiv Philharmonic, Concertgebouw Mirror Hall, and at UConn's Jorgensen Center for the Performing Arts.

She has made solo appearances with the Istanbul State Symphony, Charleston Symphony, Henderson Symphony, National Symphony Orchestra of Ukraine, Lviv Philharmonic Orchestra, the Hunan Symphony Orchestra in China, the AACC, and the Bach Festival Orchestra. She has also collaborated with Antonio Pompa-Baldi and the Slovak National Symphony in her recording of Mendelssohn Violin Concerto as well as Haydn and Hummel.

Featured appearances at chamber music festivals include Tanglewood, the Embassy Series in Washington, Emerson Quartet Festival, Newport Music Festival, Nevada Chamber Music Festival, Bach Festival of Philadelphia, Norfolk Chamber Music Festival, the Banff Centre and Ottawa Chamberfest (Canada), Musique de Chambre à Giverny (France), Prussia Cove (England), Verbier Festival and Kammermusik Bodensee (Switzerland), AlpenKammerMusik (Austria), Modern Music “Contrasts,” and KyivFest (Ukraine).

Ivakhiv's music has had a global reach, having been broadcast over three continents, multiple countries and dozens of radio stations including National Public Radio (America), the Grand 101 FM (Canada), Ukrainian National Radio and Television, and Chinese Hunan Television. Her latest record, Poems and Rhapsodies, released February 11, 2022, has been broadcast on numerous state radio stations including NPR, and Sirius XF.

== Increasing popularity of Ukrainian music ==
Ivakhiv has spent her career increasing the visibility of Ukrainian Music. She is artistic director of Music at the institute (MATI) concert series at the Ukrainian Institute of America in New York and promotes modern composers and performers through a Ukrainian Institute of America YouTube channel with recordings of concerts.

Her first album with Naxos, Ukraine - Journal to Freedom, represented eight Ukrainian composers and was recorded with 5-time Grammy winner Judith Sherman, and reached #4 in top iTunes releases when it was released in 2016.

Her work was highlighted in a New York Times article about Ukraine in 2023, saying "Protecting and Defending Ukraine’s Cultural Identity: A festival responds to the assaults and insults of war by celebrating the composer who shaped the nation's contemporary music."

== Teaching career ==
Ivakhiv teaches at the University of Connecticut where she is the Professor of Violin and Viola and the Head of Strings as well as being a professor of Violin at the Longy School of Music at Bard College.

== Discography ==
- Ukraine – Journey to Freedom.
- Mendelssohn Concertos. Brilliant Classics, rel. November 1, 2019
- Haydn + Hummel Concertos. Centaur, rel. April 17, 2020
- Poems & Rhapsodies. Centaur, rel. February 11, 2022
- Ukrainian Masters. Naxos, rel. February 23, 2024
- Ukrainian Christmas. Naxos, rel. November 8, 2024
- Music of Resilience. Naxos, August 2026

== Awards and accolades ==
In 2000 she placed second at the Sergei Prokofiev Competition and the following year was awarded the Honourable and Mrs. Peter H.B. Frelinghuysen Fellowship through the Tanglewood Music Center. In 2003 she won the Fritz Kreisler Gold Medal from the Curtis Institute of Music. In 2016 she was awarded both the University of Connecticut School of Fine arts New Scholar Award as well as the silver medal at the Global Music Awards for her album Ukraine: Journey of Freedom – A Century of Classical Music for Violin and Piano. In 2019 she was awarded the Alumni Excellence Award from the Curtis Institute of Music. In 2001 she was awarded the Merited Artist of Ukraine Award. In 2025, she was awarded the Outstanding Faculty Award by the University of Connecticut.
