= Pierre Luboshutz =

Russian pianist

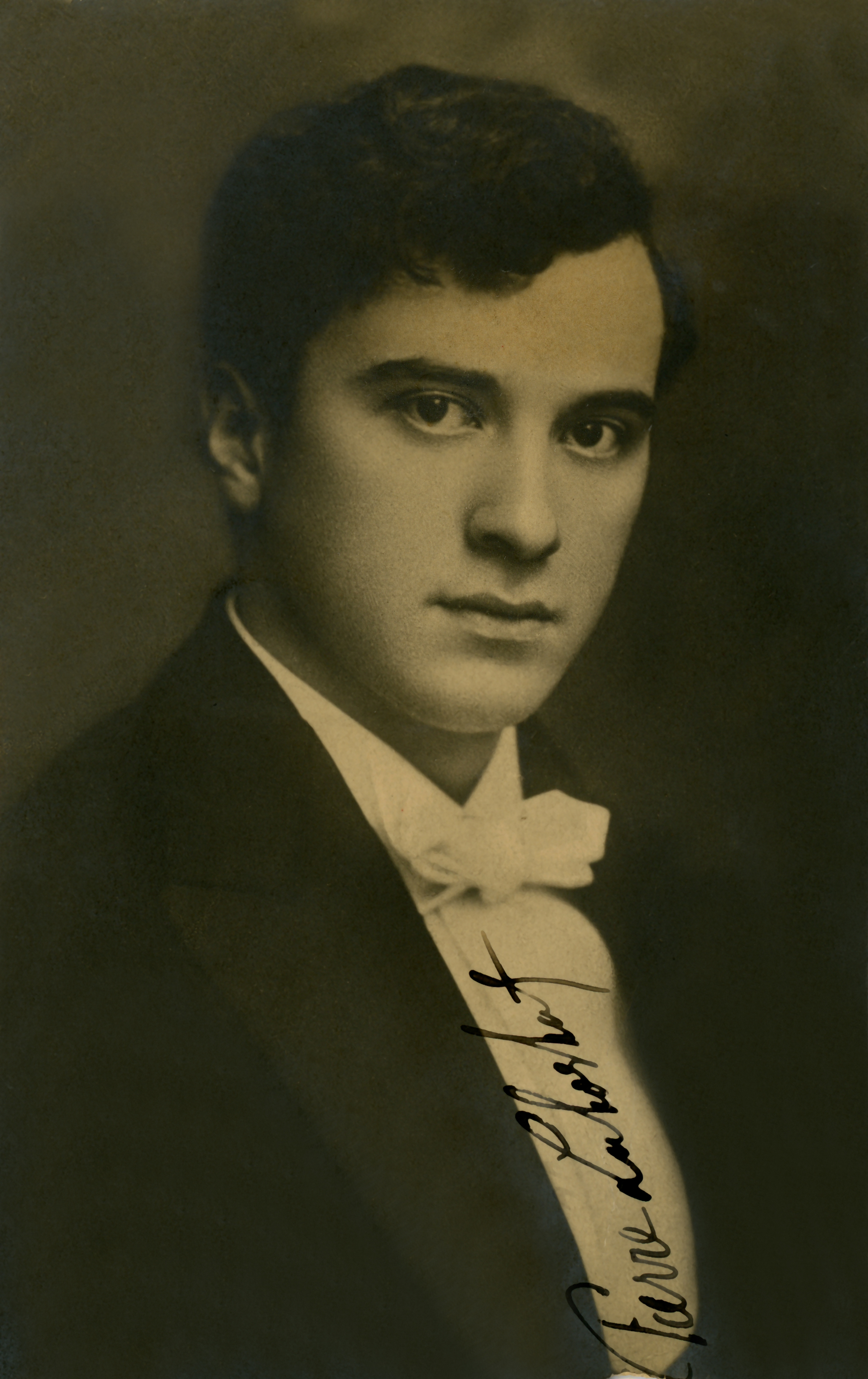
- Signed photograph

Pierre Luboshutz (June 17, 1891 - April 17, 1971) was a Russian concert pianist.

Born in Odessa, Russia, Luboshutz was initially taught to play the violin by his father. However, he then took up the piano, and followed his older sisters Lea Luboshutz (violin) and Anna Luboshutz (cello) to the Moscow Conservatory, where he studied under Konstantin Igumnov, and from which he graduated in 1912 receiving a silver medal. His first professional performance, at the Conservatory, was a performance of Brahms Piano Concerto No. 1 in D Minor, conducted by Serge Koussevitzky. Luboshutz later traveled to Paris to study under Édouard Risler.

Even before his graduation, Luboshutz had joined his two sisters in the eponymous Luboshutz Trio. The group enjoyed tremendous success until the Russian Revolution resulted in Lea's leaving the country. At its most active period (1913-1914), the group toured to fifty cities in Russia during a five-month period. Luboshutz also regularly accompanied the American dancer Isadora Duncan when she toured the country and was a regular pianist at a school she established in Moscow. As a much sought after accompanist, he toured the United States beginning in 1926 with violinists Efrem Zimbalist and Paul Kochanski, cellist Gregor Piatigorsky, and double bass virtuoso Serge Koussevitsky.

Luboshutz left the Soviet Union permanently in 1925, joining his sister Lea Luboshutz in Paris (sister Anna Luboshutz remained in Russia for her entire life), often serving as her accompanist. He also taught at the Paris Conservatory where he met his future wife, pianist Genia Nemenoff. The two eventually married in the United States in 1931 (both had come for separate concert tours) and they decided to settle in New York City in close proximity to sister Lea Luboshutz, now teaching at the Curtis Institute of Music in Philadelphia.

On October 15, 1936, they debuted a two‐piano concert tour under the name Luboshutz-Nemenoff, with their first New York performance taking place at The Town Hall on January 18, 1937. The pair became "highly acclaimed as duo pianists", and at different points in their career received excellent reviews from critics Howard Taubman and Noel Straus. They "toured widely in the Western hemisphere and Europe and South Africa," and performed at the Tanglewood Music Festival with the Boston Symphony Orchestra, and at Robin Hood Dell with the Philadelphia Orchestra. In 1956, they were joined by Luboshutz's nephew by his sister Lea, Boris Goldovsky, for a five-week tour highlighting concertos by Wolfgang Amadeus Mozart for one, two, and three pianos, as part of the bicentennial of Mozart's birth. They reprised the collaboration two years later featuring keyboard music of J.S. Bach.

Lubozhutz & Nemenoff appeared in concert with Arturo Toscanini and most of the leading conductors of the day. During their career, they premiered numerous works including a two-piano concerto by Bohuslav Martinu, with Eugene Ormandy and the Philadelphia Orchestra on November 5, 1943. Luboshutz transcribed many works for two pianos and commissioned others including a suite from the ballet "On Stage" by Norman Dello Joio.

The duo "began to curtail their performing career in the early 1960s", accepting teaching positions at the New England Conservatory of Music and in the piano department of Michigan State University, which they headed from 1962 to 1968. The couple then returned to New York City, and lived between there and Rockport, Maine.

Luboshutz died in Rockport, at the age of 76. He was survived by his wife, who died in 1989.

== Sources ==
- Wolf, Thomas, The Nightingale’s Sonata: The Musical Odyssey of Lea Luboshutz, New York and London: Pegasus Books, 2019. ISBN 978-1-64313-067-5
