= Boris Goldovsky =

American conductor

Boris Goldovsky Борис Анисимович Голдовский
- Born: June 7, 1908; Moscow, Russian Empire
- Died: February 15, 2001 (aged 92) Philadelphia, Pennsylvania, U.S.

Boris Anisimovich Goldovsky (/ɡoʊlˈdɒfski/; Russian: Борис Анисимович Голдовский; June 7, 1908 – February 15, 2001) was a Russian-born conductor and broadcast commentator, active in the United States. He has been called an important "popularizer" of opera in America. As an opera producer, conductor, impresario, and broadcaster, he was prominent within the American operatic community between 1946 and 1985.

== Early life ==
He was born in Moscow to a well-established Jewish musical family. His father was the lawyer Onissim Goldovsky, his mother the well-known concert violinist Lea Luboshutz, and several relatives were accomplished musicians, including his pianist uncle, Pierre Luboshutz, his first teacher. After the Russian Revolution, his family lost their wealth and he became, at the age of nine, his mother's accompanist to secure more food for the family.

== Career ==
Golovsky studied at the Moscow Conservatory under Karl Kipp. In the Bolshevik era, he and his mother travelled to Europe, leaving the Soviet Union. He studied with Artur Schnabel in Berlin beginning in 1924 and then with Ernő Dohnányi in Budapest beginning in 1924. He gained fluency in several languages, a gift that served him well as a translator of opera in his later career.

In 1930, he moved to Philadelphia, where his mother taught at the Curtis Institute of Music, and where he became a conducting student of Fritz Reiner and later Reiner's assistant. It was under Reiner that his love and training in opera began. According to U.S. immigration records, he was inspected and detained at Ellis Island twice: once in October 1925 for an irregularity with his visa and once in late July 1932 on suspicion that he might be an illegally contracted labourer; both situations were rather quickly resolved and he was permitted to continue by rail to Pennsylvania.

Goldovsky moved to Cleveland in 1936 to become assistant to Artur Rodziński, music director of the Cleveland Orchestra. Then he moved again to Boston in 1942, where he became director of the opera department at the New England Conservatory of Music. The same year, he was named director of the opera department at the Tanglewood Music Center in the Berkshires by Serge Koussevitsky, a position he held through 1962. Koussevitsky had become well acquainted with the Goldovsky family in Russia long before their immigration to the US. While at Tanglewood, Goldovsky conducted and directed the U.S. premieres of Idomeneo and Albert Herring, and directed the U.S. premiere of Peter Grimes, conducted by Leonard Bernstein. Sarah Caldwell became Goldovsky's assistant at Tanglewood and in Boston, and worked with him for several years.

In January 1945, Goldovsky began the New England Opera Theater (later known as the "Goldovsky Opera Theater") under the sponsorship of the New England Conservatory. The operation became independent and moved to New York in the 1950s and enjoyed four decades of touring during which young singers were trained for operatic careers. Many of them went on to sing at the Metropolitan Opera and other leading houses. He disbanded the company upon his retirement in 1985. He also joined the faculty of the Southwestern Opera Institute in the mid-1970s and worked there for ten years. During this institute, he worked with dozens of students from universities in the United States at the University of Southwestern Louisiana (now University of Louisiana, Lafayette). Invited by his former student Beaman Griffin, he was joined by his friends Richard Crittenden and Arthur Schoep. Scenes were all performed in English so singers would learn to "react as well as act."

During the New York Metropolitan Opera's tour visit to Boston in around 1946, Goldovsky participated in a promotional opera quiz event. His encyclopedic knowledge led Texaco to offer him a weekend job as master of ceremonies covering the intermission periods of the Texaco-sponsored Metropolitan Opera radio broadcasts. The sponsor agreed to pay for weekly travel to New York. He quickly became known across the United States for his Saturday radio commentary and earned the nickname of "Mr. Opera."

In 1953 he wrote Accents on Opera, a series of essays, sponsored by the Metropolitan Opera Guild and published in New York by Farrar, Straus & Young. In 1954 he received a Peabody Award for Outstanding Contribution to Radio Music. He also wrote a guide for sopranos who "often receive very little instruction when staging arias at small companies" entitled "Bringing Soprano Arias to Life." His most popular book, My Road to Opera, is an anecdote-filled autobiography.

In the late 1970s, he began again to teach at the Curtis Institute, from where he retired in 1985. He left an extensive collection of Mozart memorabilia to the Curtis Institute upon his death.

He has been credited in several recordings, including a Boston Symphony Orchestra recording of Wagner's "Lohengrin", conducted by Erich Leinsdorf. Famous associates include Mario Lanza, Leonard Bernstein and Mary Beth Peil.

He died in Brookline, Massachusetts, aged 92, in 2001.

== "Goldovsky error" ==
Goldovsky documented a kind of error that is sometimes known as a "Goldovsky error". Whilst teaching, he stopped a pupil who was sight-reading Brahms Op 76 No. 2, and asked her to correct a mistake. The pupil insisted that she had played the music as written, and this proved to be correct - not only Goldovsky's score but all available scores proved to have an error. Moreover, when Goldovsky asked skilled sight-readers to find the mistake, they could not. The mistake is in bar 78, where a G-natural was shown instead of a G-sharp. The significance is that a G-natural would be musically illogical at that point. Experienced sight-readers were automatically inferring the missing sharp symbol, and so failing to see the error in the printed score. By contrast, Goldovsky's pupil, a less experienced sight-reader, had followed the score more literally. Hence a "Goldovsky error" is one that only a novice is likely to spot.

== Goldovsky Charts ==
The invention of staging charts was an effort by Boris Goldovsky and his associates to (a) invent a way to annotate and preserve detailed stage directions (especially those stage directions that helped justify the musical content) and (b) expand Mr. Goldovsky’s teaching through associate or assistant stage directors.

As a competition-level chess player, Mr. Goldovsky began by dividing the stage into a grid of 18 squares. The production mechanism involved typewriters and photocopy machines: preserving enough of the score to present the vocal lines with space between systems to clarify stage directions.

With the charts, assistant directors could prepare ensembles by teaching the singers the stage action (“blocking”) exactly as Mr. Goldovsky envisioned it, after which he could work with the singers for final improvements, or directly present the scenes in recitals.

At numerous opera workshops (“Oglebay” in Oglebay Park, West Virginia, being the first among them), staff directors would prepare scenes - some would be seen by the workshop director in rehearsal, though most would be presented directly. As Mr. Goldovsky retired, the scenes would be presented directly by the various directors.

Stage directors had their individual touches (“dirty thumbprints” was one fond description), and there would be lively discussions on exactly which detail was preferable.

These documented charts were not widely distributed: while the shorthand is discussed in Bringing Opera to Life and Bringing Soprano Arias to Life, the charts themselves are not mentioned. However discreetly they were handled, they are clearly the result of substantial labor: after defining precise stage directions, they required photocopying the piano-vocal scores, cutting the copies into systems, pasting them onto typewritten pages with the instructions interposed, and finally, copied again.

As of November 2020, The Robinson Music Library of the Cleveland Institute of Music has nine volumes of charts on permanent reserve with call number Ref. MT 955.G56g.

== Publications ==
- Bringing Opera to Life (1968), about operatic acting and stage direction. New York: Appleton-Century-Crofts.
- Bringing Soprano Arias to Life (1973) (with Arthur Schoep). New York: G. Schirmer.
- Touring Opera: a Manual for Small Companies (1975) (with Thomas Wolf, foreword by Sherrill Milnes). National Opera Association.
- My Road to Opera: the Recollections of Boris Goldovsky (1979) Houghton Mifflin. ISBN 0-395-27760-4 OCLC 4516063
- The Indiana University published transcripts of his intermission commentary from the Metropolitan Opera radio broadcasts in 1984.
- Some intermission commentary transcripts can be found at https://web.archive.org/web/20090112035213/http://www.operainfo.org/intermissions/

== See also ==
- Metropolitan Opera radio broadcasts

== Bibliography ==
- Wolf, Thomas, The Nightingale’s Sonata: The Musical Odyssey of Lea Luboshutz, New York and London: Pegasus Books, 2019. ISBN 978-1-64313-067-5
- Resources from the Spaulding Library at New England Conservatory
- Goldovsky, Recollections
- Macpherson and Klein, Measure by Measure
- Edward Rothstein, Opera: Goldovsky Company's Farewell, The New York Times, March 19, 1984.
- The Boston Opera Company 1909-1915, by Quaintance Eaton, Appleton-Century Press, (1965) New York.
