= 1943 in music =

This is a list of notable events in music that took place in the year 1943.

== Specific locations ==
- 1943 in British music
- 1943 in Norwegian music

== Specific genres ==
- 1943 in country music
- 1943 in jazz

== Events ==
- January 1 – Frank Sinatra appears at the Paramount Theatre causing a mob of hysterical bobby soxers to flood Times Square and block midtown New York City traffic for hours. Sinatra becomes a featured singer on the popular Your Hit Parade radio program, and co-star of the series Broadway Bandbox. By fall, he will have left Bandbox to star in his own series Songs By Sinatra.
- January 23 – Duke Ellington's orchestra performs for the first time at New York City's Carnegie Hall. During the concert, which raises money for war relief, Ellington premieres his most famous and revered extended composition, Black, Brown and Beige.
- June 1 – A performance of Darius Milhaud's suite for two pianos Scaramouche at the École Normale de Musique de Paris in Nazi occupied France is billed anagrammatically as Mous Are-chac by 'Hamid-al-Usurid' to evade the ban on works by Jewish composers.
- June 17 – Perry Como signs with RCA in the United States.
- September 27 – Decca Records is the first label to come to terms with the American Federation of Musicians, which has been on strike since August 1942 over music royalties. The first song to be recorded is "Pistol Packin' Mama" by Bing Crosby and the Andrews Sisters.
- October 30 – "Pistol Packin' Mama" by Al Dexter goes where no "Hillbilly" record has ever gone, to the top of the National Best Selling Retail Records chart in the United States. Despite fighting a World War in Europe and the Pacific, civilian and armed forces alike are caught up in a national craze not seen again until Elvis and the Beatles. But not everyone is excited about Country music: Dexter's publishing company sues The Hit Parade radio show for ignoring their record.
- November 14 – Leonard Bernstein, substituting at the last minute for ailing principal conductor Bruno Walter, directs the New York Philharmonic in its regular Sunday afternoon broadcast concert on CBS. The event receives front-page coverage in The New York Times the following day.
- Jo Stafford and The Pied Pipers sign with the newly formed Capitol Records (having broken from the Tommy Dorsey band in 1942).
- Fredda Gibson takes her professional name, "Georgia Gibbs", and begins appearing on the popular Camel Caravan radio program in the United States, hosted by Jimmy Durante and Garry Moore (It is Moore who bestows the famous nickname "Her Nibs, Miss Georgia Gibbs" upon her, a playful reference to her diminutive stature).
- The Ward Singers first tour nationally in the United States.
- Carter Family disbands.
- William Schuman's cantata A Free Song wins the first Pulitzer Prize for Music.

== Albums released ==
- Oklahoma – Original Broadway Cast, 1,000,000 sales
- Reveille with Beverly – Original soundtrack

== Top popular recordings 1943 ==
The following songs appeared in The Billboard's 'Best Selling Retail Records' chart during 1943. Each week fifteen points were awarded to the number one record, then nine points for number two, eight points for number three, and so on. The total points a record earned determined its year-end rank. Regional charts determined the 11–25 rankings each week, and records that failed to score on the main chart were ranked by highest position. Additional information was obtained from the "Discography of American Historical Recordings" website, Joel Whitburn's Pop Memories 1890–1954 and other sources as specified.

Rank<	Artist	Title	Label	Recorded	Released	Chart positions
1	The Mills Brothers	"Paper Doll"	Decca 18318	February 18, 1942	May 22, 1943	US BB 1943 #2, US #1 for 12 weeks, 40 total weeks, US R&B 1943 #14, Harlem Hit Parade #2 for 5 weeks, 29 total weeks, 287 points, 1,000,000 sales, Grammy Hall of Fame 1998
2	Harry James and His Orchestra (Vocal Helen Forrest)	"I've Heard That Song Before"	Columbia 36668	July 31, 1942	December 4, 1942	US BB 1943 #1, US #1 for 13 weeks, 26 total weeks, 240 points, 1,000,000 sales
3	Tommy Dorsey and His Orchestra (Vocal Frank Sinatra & Pied Pipers)	"There Are Such Things"	Victor 27974	July 1, 1942	July 17, 1942	US BB 1943 #4, US #1 for 5 weeks, 26 total weeks, 176 points, 1,000,000 sales
4	Bing Crosby	"Sunday, Monday or Always"	Decca 18561	July 2, 1943	August 21, 1943	US BB 1943 #3, US #1 for 7 weeks, 20 total weeks, 174 points, 1,000,000 sales
5	Xavier Cugat & His Waldorf-Astoria Orchestra	"Brazil"	Columbia 36651	January 23, 1943	February 1943	US BB 1943 #5, US #2 for 7 weeks, 24 total weeks, 140 points
6	Al Dexter and His Troopers	"Pistol Packin' Mama"	Okeh 6708	March 20, 1942	April 10, 1943	US BB 1943 #10, US #1, US Hillbilly 1943 #1, USHB #1 for 27 weeks, 47 total weeks, 109 points, 1,000,000 sales Grammy Hall of Fame in 2000
7	Dick Haymes & the Song Spinners	"You'll Never Know"	Decca 18556	May 27, 1943	June 1943	US BB 1943 #5, US #1 for 4 weeks, 19 total weeks, US R&B 1943 #5, Harlem Hit Parade #1 for 4 weeks, 16 total weeks, 135 points, Oscar in 1943 (film 'Hello, Frisco, Hello'), ASCAP song of 1943, 1,000,000 sales
8	Harry James and His Orchestra (Vocal Helen Forrest)	"I Had The Craziest Dream"	Columbia 36659	July 23, 1942	October 10, 1942	US BB 1943 #9, US #1 for 2 weeks, 22 total weeks, 128 points
9	Harry James and His Orchestra (Vocal Frank Sinatra)	"All or Nothing at All"	Columbia 35587	September 17, 1939	May 1943	US BB 1943 #19, US #2 for 1 weeks, 25 total weeks, 107 points, 1,000,000 sales
10	Glenn Miller and His Orchestra	"That Old Black Magic"	Victor 20-1523	July 15, 1942	January 1943	US BB 1943 #11, US #1 for 1 weeks, 19 total weeks, 105 points
11	Tommy Dorsey and His Orchestra (Vocal Frank Sinatra)	"In The Blue Of Evening"	Victor 27947	June 17, 1943	July 31, 1943	US BB 1943 #6, US #1 for 3 weeks, 20 total weeks, 123 points
12	Dinah Shore	"You'd Be So Nice to Come Home To"	Victor 20-1519	July 30, 1942	November 20, 1942	US BB 1943 #15, US #2 for 2 weeks, 20 total weeks, 73 points
13	Dick Haymes & the Song Spinners	"It Can't Be Wrong"	Decca 18557	May 27, 1943	June 1943	US BB 1943 #13, US #2 for 5 weeks, 15 total weeks, 71 points
14	Harry James and His Orchestra	"Velvet Moon"	Columbia 36672	July 31, 1942	February 19, 1943	US BB 1943 #17, US #2 for 2 weeks, 17 total weeks, 68 points
15	Jacques Renard & His Orchestra	"As Time Goes By"	Victor 20-1526	July 25, 1931	March 1943	US BB 1943 #21, US #2 for 1 week, 18 total weeks, 250,000 sales
16	Bing Crosby and the Andrews Sisters	"Pistol Packin' Mama"	Decca 23277	September 27, 1943	October 14, 1943	US 1943 #14, US #2 for 1 week, 15 total weeks, US Hillbilly 1943 #2, USHB #1 for 11 weeks, 23 total weeks, 1,000,000 sales
17	Benny Goodman and His Orchestra (Vocal Peggy Lee)	"Why Don't You Do Right?"	Columbia 35869	April 17, 1943	May 1943	US BB 1943 #7, US #1 for 3 weeks, 15 total weeks
18	Bing Crosby	"Moonlight Becomes You"	Decca 18513	June 12, 1942	November 19, 1942	US BB 1943 #20, US #3 for 1 weeks, 20 total weeks, 1,000,000 sales
19	Tommy Dorsey and His Orchestra (Vocal Frank Sinatra)	"It Started All Over Again"	Victor 27947	June 17, 1943	July 31, 1943	US BB 1943 #6, US #1 for 3 weeks, 20 total weeks
20	Dinah Shore	"Why Don't You Fall in Love with Me"	Victor 27970	July 30, 1942	September 11, 1942	US BB 1943 #23, US #3 for 2 weeks, 16 total weeks
21	Rudy Vallee & His Connecticut Yankees	"As Time Goes By"	Victor 20-1526	July 25, 1931	March 1943	US BB 1943 #21, US #2 for 1 week, 18 total weeks
22	Judy Garland & Gene Kelly	"For Me and My Gal"	Decca 18480	July 26, 1942	December 1942	US BB 1943 #25, US #3 for 1 week, 21 total weeksGrammy Hall of Fame in 2010 (1942)
23	Bing Crosby	"I'll Be Home for Christmas"	Decca 18570	October 1, 1943	December 4, 1943	US BB 1943 #24, US #3 for 2 weeks, 7 total weeks, 1,000,000 sales
24	Song Spinners	"Comin' In On a Wing and a Prayer"	Decca 18553	June 19, 1943	July 1943	US BB 1943 #8, US #1 for 3 weeks, 12 total weeks, 91 points
25	Harry James and His Orchestra	"I Heard You Cried Last Night"	Columbia 36672	July 31, 1942	February 19, 1943	US BB 1943 #17, US #2 for 2 weeks, 17 total weeks, 90 points
26	Benny Goodman and His Orchestra (Vocal Helen Forrest)	"Taking a Chance on Love"	Columbia 35869	April 17, 1943	May 1943	US BB 1943 #7, US #1 for 3 weeks, 15 total weeks, 89 points
27	Bing Crosby & Trudy Erwin	"People Will Say We're In Love"	Decca 18564	August 23, 1943	October 9, 1943	US BB 1943 #22, US #2 for 1 week, 17 total weeks, 86 points
28	The Ink Spots	"Don't Get Around Much Anymore"	Decca 18503	February 6, 1943	March 1943	US BB 1943 #18, US #2 for 1 week, 27 total weeks, 82 points
29	Frank Sinatra	"You'll Never Know"	Columbia 36678	July 24, 1943	August 1943	US BB 1943 #16, US #2 for 2 weeks, 19 total weeks, 77 points
30	Glenn Miller and His Orchestra	"Moonlight Becomes You"	Decca 18513	June 12, 1942	November 19, 1942	US BB 1943 #20, US #3 for 1 weeks, 20 total weeks, 1,000,000 sales
31	Dinah Shore	"Murder, He Says"	Victor 27970	July 30, 1942	September 11, 1942	US BB 1943 #23, US #3 for 2 weeks, 16 total weeks
32	Ted Daffan's Texans	"No Letter Today"	Okeh 6706	February 20, 1942	February 1943	US BB 1943 #50, US #9 for 1 week, 20 total weeks, US Hillbilly 1943 #3, USHB #1 for 5 weeks, 53 total weeks, 1,000,000 sales
33	Erskine Hawkins	"Don't Cry, Baby"	Bluebird 30-0813	June 12, 1942	November 19, 1942	US BS 1943 #58, US #11 for 2 weeks, 20 total weeks, US R&B 1943 #1, Harlem Hit Parade #1 for 14 weeks, 29 total weeks, August 14 – November 13, 1943

=== Harlem Hit Parade Top Records of 1943 ===
Rank	Artist	Title	Label	Recorded	Released	Chart positions
1	Erskine Hawkins and His Orchestra	"Don't Cry, Baby"	Bluebird 30-0813	June 12, 1942	November 19, 1942	US Billboard 1943 #57, US Pop #11 for 3 weeks, 20 total weeks, US R&B 1943 #1, Harlem Hit Parade #1 for 14 weeks, 29 total weeks, August 14 – November 13, 1943
2	Duke Ellington and His Famous Orchestra	"Don't Get Around Much Anymore"	Victor 20-1547	March 15, 1940	December 1943	US Billboard 1944 #80, US Pop #10 for 1 week, 10 total weeks, US R&B 1944 #7, Harlem Hit Parade #1 for 9 weeks, 18 total weeks, 191 points
3	The Mills Brothers	"Paper Doll"	Decca 18318	February 18, 1942	May 22, 1943	US Billboard 1943 #1, US Pop #1 for 12 weeks, 40 total weeks, 287 points, US R&B 1943 #14, Harlem Hit Parade #2 for 5 weeks, 29 total weeks, Grammy Hall of Fame 1998, 1,000,000 sales,
4	The Ink Spots	"Don't Get Around Much Anymore"	Decca 18503	February 6, 1943	March 1943	US Billboard 1943 #16, US Pop #2 for 1 week, 27 total weeks, 82 points
5	Lucky Millinder and His Orchestra	"Apollo Jump"	Victor 20-1547	March 15, 1940	December 1943	US Billboard 1944 #80, US Pop #10 for 1 week, 10 total weeks, US R&B 1944 #7, Harlem Hit Parade #1 for 9 weeks, 18 total weeks, 191 points
6	The Ink Spots	"I Can't Stand Losing You"	Decca 18503	February 6, 1943	March 1943	US Billboard 1943 #16, US Pop #2 for 1 week, 27 total weeks, 82 points
7	Bea Booze	"See See Rider Blues"	Victor 20-1547	March 15, 1940	December 1943	US Billboard 1944 #80, US Pop #10 for 1 week, 10 total weeks, US R&B 1944 #7, Harlem Hit Parade #1 for 9 weeks, 18 total weeks, 191 points
8	Paul Whiteman and His Orchestra vocals Billie Holiday	"Trav'lin' Light"	Capitol 47	June 12, 1942	December 1942	US Billboard 1943 #80, US Pop #10 for 1 week, 10 total weeks, US R&B 1944 #7, Harlem Hit Parade #1 for 9 weeks, 18 total weeks, 191 points
9	Dick Haymes and the Song Spinners	"You'll Never Know"	Decca 18556	May 27, 1943	June 1943	US Billboard 1943 #6, US Pop #1 for 4 weeks, 19 total weeks, 135 points, US R&B 1943 #9, Harlem Hit Parade #1 for 4 weeks, 16 total weeks
10	Lucky Millinder and His Orchestra	"When The Lights Go On Again (All Over The World)"	Victor 20-1547	March 15, 1940	December 1943	US Billboard 1944 #80, US Pop #10 for 1 week, 10 total weeks, US R&B 1944 #7, Harlem Hit Parade #1 for 9 weeks, 18 total weeks, 191 points

== Published popular music ==
- "All Er Nuthin'" words: Oscar Hammerstein II music: Richard Rodgers
- "Amor" w. (Eng) Sunny Skylar (Sp) Ricardo Lopez Mendez m. Gabriel Ruiz
- "Artistry In Rhythm" m. Stan Kenton
- "Beat Out Dat Rhythm On a Drum" w. Oscar Hammerstein II m. Georges Bizet
- "Besame Mucho" w. Sunny Skylar m. Conseulo Velázquez
- "By the River of the Roses" w. Marty Symes m. Joe Burke
- "Candlelight and Wine" w. Harold Adamson m. Jimmy McHugh. Introduced by Georgia Carroll and Harry Babbitt in the film Around the World
- "Close to You" w.m. Al Hoffman, Jerry Livingston & Carl Lampl
- "Comin' In on a Wing and a Prayer" w. Harold Adamson m. Jimmy McHugh
- "Do Nothin' Till You Hear from Me" w. Bob Russell m. Duke Ellington
- "Don't Let's Be Beastly To The Germans" w.m. Noël Coward
- "Don't Sweetheart Me" w. Charles Tobias m. Cliff Friend
- "The Farmer and the Cowman" w. Oscar Hammerstein II m. Richard Rodgers from the musical Oklahoma!
- "A Fellow on a Furlough" w.m. Bobby Worth
- "Foolish Heart" w. Ogden Nash m. Kurt Weill. Introduced by Mary Martin in the musical One Touch Of Venus
- "Have I Stayed Away Too Long?" w.m. Frank Loesser
- "Hit the Road to Dreamland" w. Johnny Mercer m. Harold Arlen
- "How Much I Love You" w. Ogden Nash m. Kurt Weill. Introduced by Kenny Baker in the musical One Touch Of Venus
- "I Cain't Say No" w. Oscar Hammerstein II m. Richard Rodgers
- "I Couldn't Sleep A Wink Last Night" w. Harold Adamson m. Jimmy McHugh
- "I Love You" w. Robert Wright & George Forrest m. Grieg
- "I Sustain the Wings" m. Glenn Miller, Chummy MacGregor, Norman Leyden & Bill Meyers
- "If You Please" w. Johnny Burke m. Jimmy Van Heusen
- "I'll Be Home for Christmas" w.m. Kim Gannon, Walter Kent & Buck Ram
- "I'm a Stranger Here Myself" w. Ogden Nash m. Kurt Weill. Introduced by Mary Martin in the musical One Touch Of Venus
- "I'm Going to Get Lit Up When the Lights Go On In London" w.m. Hubert Gregg
- "I'm Riding for a Fall" w. Frank Loesser m. Arthur Schwartz. Introduced by Dennis Morgan and Joan Leslie in the film Thank Your Lucky Stars
- "It Could Happen to You" w. Johnny Burke m. Jimmy Van Heusen
- "It's a Scandal! It's a Outrage!" w. Oscar Hammerstein II m. Richard Rodgers. From the musical Oklahoma!
- "A Journey to a Star" w. Leo Robin m. Harry Warren. Introduced by Alice Faye in the film The Gang's All Here
- "Julpolskan" w.m. Anna-Lisa Frykman (in Nu ska vi sjunga)
- "Kansas City" w. Oscar Hammerstein II m. Richard Rodgers
- "A Lovely Way to Spend an Evening" w. Harold Adamson m. Jimmy McHugh
- "Mairzy Doats" w.m. Milton Drake, Al Hoffman & Jerry Livingston
- "Many a New Day" w. Oscar Hammerstein II m. Richard Rodgers
- "La Mer" w.m. Charles Trenet
- "Moonlight in Vermont" w. John Blackburn m. Karl Suessdorf
- "My Heart Tells Me" w. Mack Gordon m. Harry Warren
- "My Shining Hour" w. Johnny Mercer m. Harold Arlen
- "No Love, No Nothin' " w. Leo Robin m. Harry Warren. Introduced by Alice Faye in the film The Gang's All Here
- "Oh, What a Beautiful Mornin'"' w. Oscar Hammerstein II m. Richard Rodgers
- "Oklahoma!" w. Oscar Hammerstein II m. Richard Rodgers
- "One for My Baby (and One More for the Road)" w. Johnny Mercer m. Harold Arlen
- "Opus No. 1" w. Sid Garris m. Sy Oliver
- "Out of My Dreams" w. Oscar Hammerstein II m. Richard Rodgers
- "Pedro the Fisherman" w. Harold Purcell m. Harry Parr-Davies
- "People Will Say We're In Love" w. Oscar Hammerstein II m. Richard Rodgers
- "Pore Jud is Daid" w. Oscar Hammerstein II m. Richard Rodgers
- "San Fernando Valley" w.m. Gordon Jenkins
- "Say a Prayer for the Boys Over There" w. Herb Magidson m. Jimmy McHugh. Introduced by Deanna Durbin in the film Hers to Hold
- "Shoo-Shoo Baby" w.m. Phil Moore
- "Silver Wings In The Moonlight" w.m. Hughie Charles, Sonny Miller & Leo Towers
- "So Tired" w.m. Russ Morgan & Jack Stuart
- "Speak Low" w. Ogden Nash m. Kurt Weill. w. Ogden Nash m. Kurt Weill. Introduced by Mary Martin and Kenny Baker in the musical One Touch Of Venus. Performed in the 1948 film version by Dick Haymes, and Eileen Wilson dubbing for Ava Gardner.
- "Star Eyes" w.m. Don Raye & Gene De Paul
- "Straighten Up and Fly Right" w.m. Nat King Cole & Irving Mills
- "Sunday, Monday Or Always" w. Johnny Burke m. Jimmy Van Heusen
- "Take It Easy" w.m. Albert De Brue, Irving Tayor & Vic Mizzy. Introduced in the 1944 musical film Two Girls and a Sailor by Virginia O'Brien, Lee Wilde, Lyn Wilde, and Lina Romay with Xavier Cugat and His Orchestra
- "The Surrey with the Fringe on Top" w. Oscar Hammerstein II m. Richard Rodgers
- "That's Him" w. Ogden Nash m. Kurt Weill w. Ogden Nash m. Kurt Weill. Introduced by Mary Martin in the musical One Touch of Venus. Performed in the 1948 film version by Eileen Wilson (dubbing for Ava Gardner), Olga San Juan and Eve Arden.
- "They're Either Too Young or Too Old" w. Frank Loesser m. Arthur Schwartz
- "Tico-Tico" w. (Eng) Ervin Drake (Port) Aloysio Oliviera m. Zequinha Abreu
- "To Keep My Love Alive" w. Lorenz Hart m. Richard Rodgers
- "Vict'ry Polka" w. Sammy Cahn m. Jule Styne
- "What Do You Do In the Infantry?" w.m. Frank Loesser
- "When Can I Have a Banana Again?" w.m. Nat Mills, Gaby Rogers, Harry Roy
- "You'll Never Know" w. Mack Gordon m. Harry Warren introduced by Alice Faye in the film Hello, Frisco, Hello and also performed by Faye in the 1944 film Four Jills in a Jeep

== Classical music ==
=== Premieres ===
Composer	Composition	Date	Location	Performers
Berkeley, Lennox	Symphony No. 1	1943-07-08	London (Proms)	London Philharmonic – Cameron
Britten, Benjamin	Prelude and Fugue for Strings	1943-06-23	London	Neel String Orchestra – Neel
Britten, Benjamin	Serenade for Tenor, Horn and Strings	1943-10-15	London	Pears, Brain / Neel String Orchestra – Britten
Copland, Aaron	Music for the Movies	1943-02-17	New York City	Saidenberg Little Symphony – Saidenberg
Copland, Aaron	Fanfare for the Common Man	1943-03-12	Cincinnati	Cincinnati Symphony Orchestra – Goossens
Dale, Benjamin	The Flowing Tide	1943-08-06	London (Proms)	BBC Symphony – Boult
Dunhill, Thomas	Waltz Suite	1943-08-05	London (Proms)	BBC Symphony – Dunhill
Dutilleux, Henri	Melodies for Voice and Orchestra	1943-12-14	Paris	Panzera / Paris Conservatory Concert Orchestra – Tomasi
Feldman, Morton	Dirge in Memory of Thomas Wolfe	1943-04-15	New York City	HSMA Senior Symphony – Feldman
Foss, Lukas	The Prairie	1946-10-15	Boston	Boston Symphony – Koussevitzky
Ginastera, Alberto	Dances from Estancia	1943-05-12	Buenos Aires	Teatro Colón Regular Orchestra – Calusio
Gundry, Inglis	Heyday Freedom, orchestral suite	1943-06-26	London (Proms)	London Philharmonic – Cameron
Hanson, Howard	Requiem (Symphony No. 4)	1943-12-03	Boston	Boston Symphony – Hanson
Harris, Roy	Symphony No. 5	1943-02-26	Boston	Boston Symphony – Koussevitzky
Jolivet, André	Les trois complaintes du soldat	1943-02-28	Paris	Bernac / Paris Conservatory Concert Orchestra – Munch
Martinů, Bohuslav	Concerto for Two Pianos	1943-11-05	Philadelphia	Luboshutz, Nemenoff / Philadelphia Orchestra – Ormandy
Martinů, Bohuslav	Memorial to Lidice	1943-10-28	New York City	New York Philharmonic – Rodzinski
Martinů, Bohuslav	Symphony No. 2	1943-10-28	Cleveland, Ohio	Cleveland Orchestra – Leinsdorf
Martinů, Bohuslav	Violin Concerto No. 2	1943-12-31	Boston	Elman / Boston Symphony – Koussevitzky
Messiaen, Olivier	Visions de l'Amen	1943-05-10	Paris	Loriod, Messiaen
Moeran, Ernest John	Rhapsody No. 3, for piano and orchestra	1943-08-19	London (Proms)	Cohen / BBC Symphony – Boult
Moroi, Saburō	Sinfonietta for Children	1943-11-05	Tokyo	Tokyo Broadcast Orchestra – Moroi
Ponce, Manuel	Violin Concerto	1943-08-20	México DF	Szeryng / Mexico Symphony – Chávez
Prokofiev, Sergei	Flute Sonata	1943-12-07	Moscow	Kharkovsky, Richter
Prokofiev, Sergei	Piano Sonata No. 7	1943-01-18	Moscow	Richter
Prokofiev, Sergei	The Year 1941	1943-01-21	Sverdlovsk, Russia	USSR Radio Symphony – Rabinovich
Rodrigo, Joaquín	Concierto heroico	1943-04-03	Lisbon	Querol / Spanish National Orchestra – E. Halffter
Rowley, Alec	Burlesque Quadrilles	1943-07-13	London (Proms)	London Philharmonic – Cameron
Rubbra, Edmund	Sinfonia Concertante for piano and orchestra	1943-08-10	London (Proms)	Rubbra / BBC Symphony – Boult
Schuman, William	Symphony for Strings (Symphony No. 5)	1943-11-12	Boston	Boston Symphony – Koussevitzky
Shostakovich, Dmitri	Piano Sonata No. 2	1943-06-06	Moscow	Shostakovich
Shostakovich, Dmitri	Six Romances on Verses by English Poets	1943-06-06	Moscow	Flachs, Shostakovich
Shostakovich, Dmitri	Symphony No. 8	1943-11-04	Moscow	USSR State Symphony – Mravinsky
Strauss, Richard	Divertimento after pieces by Couperin	1943-01-31	Vienna	Vienna Philharmonic – Krauss
Stravinsky, Igor	Ode	1943-10-08	Boston	Boston Symphony – Koussevitzky
Tippett, Michael	Boyhood's End	1943-05-24	Morley College, London	Unspecified performers
Tippett, Michael	String Quartet No. 2	1943-03-27	London	Zorian Quartet
Tubin, Eduard	Suite on Estonian Dance Tunes	1943-10-02	Tartu, Estonia	Turgan, Mangre
Vaughan Williams, Ralph	Symphony No. 5	1943-06-24	London (Proms)	London Philharmonic – Vaughan Williams
Villa Lobos, Heitor	String Quartet No. 6	1943-11-30	Rio de Janeiro	Quarteto Haydn
Walton, William	Violin Concerto (2nd version)	1943-11-30	Wolverhampton, UK	Royal Liverpool Philharmonic – Sargent
Webern, Anton	Three Lieder, Op. 23	1943-12-05	Basel, Switzerland	Gradmann-Lüscher, Baumgartner
Webern, Anton	Variations for Orchestra (1940)	1943-03-03	Winterthur, Switzerland	Stadtorchester Winterthur – Scherchen
Weisgall, Hugo	American Comedy 1943	1943-07-29	London (Proms)	BBC Symphony – Weisgall

=== Compositions ===
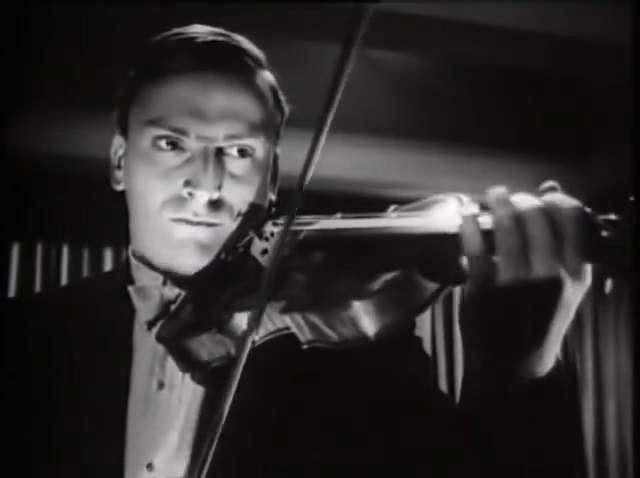
Yehudi Menuhin in 1943

- Henk Badings – Symphony No. 4
- Béla Bartók – Concerto for Orchestra
- Leonard Bernstein – I Hate Music
- Benjamin Britten
  - Rejoice in the Lamb, festival cantata
  - Serenade for Tenor, Horn and Strings
- Alberto Ginastera – Five Argentinian Folk Songs
- Reinhold Glière – 25 let Krasnoj Armii (25 Years of the Red Army), Ouverture for wind-orchestra op. 84
- Morton Gould – Viola Concerto
- Howard Hanson – Symphony No. 4
- Paul Hindemith
  - Symphonic Metamorphosis of Themes by Carl Maria von Weber for orchestra
  - Ludus Tonalis, for piano
- Joaquim Homs – Choral Mass
- Paul von Klenau – String Quartet No. 3
- Rued Langgaard – Concerto in one movement for violin and orchestra
- Bohuslav Martinů
  - Symphony No. 2
  - In Memory of Lidice
  - Concerto for Two Pianos
  - Violin Concerto No. 2
- Nikolai Medtner – Piano Concerto No. 3
- Douglas Moore – In memoriam
- Saburō Moroi – Sinfonietta for Children
- Vítězslav Novák – May Symphony, for soli, chorus and orchestra
- Carl Orff – Catulli Carmina (revised version)
- Walter Piston – Symphony No. 2
- Manuel Ponce – Violin Concerto
- Sergei Prokofiev – Flute Sonata in D Major
- Joaquín Rodrigo – Heroic Concerto
- William Schuman – Symphony No. 5, for strings
- Dmitri Shostakovich
  - Piano Sonata No. 2
  - Symphony No. 8
- Randall Thompson – The Testament of Freedom
- Eduard Tubin – Suite on Estonian Dances for Violin and Piano
- Ralph Vaughan Williams
  - The Story of a Flemish Farm
  - Symphony No. 5 in D Major
- William Walton
  - The Quest (ballet)
  - Violin Concerto
- Alberto Williams – Poema del Iguazú

== Opera ==
- Hans Krása – Brundibár, children's opera, first performed by inmates of Terezin transit camp

== Film ==
- Bernard Herrmann – Jane Eyre (1943 film)
- Alfred Newman – The Song of Bernadette
- Miklós Rózsa – Sahara
- Ralph Vaughan Williams – Coastal Command

== Musical theatre ==
- Bright Lights of 1944 Broadway production opened at the Forrest Theatre on September 16 and ran for 4 performances
- Carmen Jones Broadway production opened at the Broadway Theatre on December 2 and ran for 502 performances
- Early to Bed Broadway production opened at the Broadhurst Theatre on June 17 and ran for 380 performances
- The Lisbon Story London production opened at the Hippodrome Theatre on June 17 and ran for 492 performances
- Oklahoma! (Richard Rodgers and Oscar Hammerstein II) – Broadway production opened at the St. James Theatre on March 31 and ran for 2411 performances
- One Touch Of Venus Broadway production opened at the Imperial Theatre on October 7 and ran for 567 performances
- Show Boat (Jerome Kern and Oscar Hammerstein II) – London revival opened at the Stoll Theatre on April 17 and ran for 264 performances
- Sweet And Low London revue opened at the Ambassadors Theatre on June 10 and ran for 264 performances

== Musical films ==
- Beautiful Michoacán (Spanish:¡Qué lindo es Michoacán!), starring Tito Guízar, Gloria Marín and Víctor Manuel Mendoza.
- Best Foot Forward, starring Lucille Ball and Nancy Walker and featuring Harry James & his Music Makers
- Cabin In The Sky, starring Ethel Waters, Eddie Anderson, Lena Horne and Louis Armstrong
- Coney Island, starring Betty Grable, George Montgomery, Cesar Romero and Phil Silvers
- Crazy House, starring Ole Olsen, Chic Johnson and Cass Daley
- DuBarry Was a Lady, released August 13 starring Red Skelton, Lucille Ball, Gene Kelly, Virginia O'Brien, Tommy Dorsey & his Orchestra and the Pied Pipers.
- The Gang's All Here, starring Alice Faye, Carmen Miranda and Edward Everett Horton and featuring Benny Goodman & his Orchestra
- Girl Crazy, starring Mickey Rooney, Judy Garland and June Allyson
- Happy Go Lucky, starring Mary Martin, Dick Powell, Betty Hutton and Rudy Vallee
- Hers to Hold, released July 16, starring Deanna Durbin and Joseph Cotten.
- Higher and Higher, featuring Frank Sinatra and Victor Borge
- Hit Parade of 1943, starring John Carroll, Susan Hayward, Gail Patrick and Eve Arden and featuring Dorothy Dandridge, Count Basie & his Orchestra, Freddy Martin & his Orchestra and Ray McKinley & his Orchestra
- I Dood It, starring Eleanor Powell and Red Skelton and featuring Helen O'Connell & Bob Eberly with Jimmy Dorsey and his Orchestra, and Hazel Scott.
- Let's Face It, starring Bob Hope, Betty Hutton, Zasu Pitts and Eve Arden
- Mister Big, starring Donald O'Connor, Gloria Jean, Peggy Ryan and Robert Paige and featuring Ray Eberle
- Reveille with Beverly, starring Ann Miller and featuring Frank Sinatra, Ella Mae Morse, The Mills Brothers, Freddie Slack & his Orchestra, Bob Crosby & his Orchestra and Duke Ellington & his Orchestra
- Riding High, starring Dorothy Lamour and Dick Powell
- Something to Shout About, released February 25, starring Don Ameche, Janet Blair, Jack Oakie and Cyd Charisse, and featuring Hazel Scott.
- Stormy Weather, released July 21, starring Lena Horne, Cab Calloway and "Bojangles" Bill Robinson.
- Swing Fever, starring Kay Kyser & his Orchestra, Marilyn Maxwell and Lena Horne; directed by Tim Whelan.
- Thousands Cheer, starring Kathryn Grayson, Gene Kelly, Mary Astor and John Boles and featuring Mickey Rooney, Judy Garland and Eleanor Powell.
- We'll Meet Again, released January 18, starring Vera Lynn, Geraldo and Patricia Roc.

== Births ==
=== January–March ===
- January 2 – Barış Manço, singer-songwriter (died 1999)
- January 3 – Van Dyke Parks, singer, arranger and composer
- January 7 – Richard Armstrong, orchestral conductor
- January 9 – Scott Walker, singer and composer (died 2019)
- January 10
  - Jim Croce, singer-songwriter (died 1973)
  - Alan Lloyd, composer (died 1986)
- January 14
  - Mariss Jansons, conductor (died 2019)
  - José Luis Rodríguez, singer
- January 16
  - Gavin Bryars, composer and double bassist
  - Brian Ferneyhough, English composer
  - Ronnie Milsap, country musician
- January 17 – Chris Montez, singer
- January 18 – Dave Greenslade, composer and rock keyboard player (Colosseum, Greenslade, If)
- January 19 – Janis Joplin, blues singer (died 1970)
- January 26
  - Thom Bell, Philadelphia soul songwriter and producer (died 2022)
  - Jean Knight, New Orleans R&B and soul singer (died 2023)
- January 29
  - Tony Blackburn, British radio DJ and singer
  - Molly Meldrum, Australian TV host (d. 2026)
- January 30 – Marty Balin, American rock musician (Jefferson Airplane) (died 2018)
- February 3
  - Neil Bogart, American record producer, founder of Casablanca Records (died 1982)
  - Dennis Edwards, American soul and R&B singer (The Temptations) (died 2018)
  - Eric Haydock, English pop/rock guitarist (The Hollies) (died 2019)
  - Shawn Phillips, American folk-rock musician
- February 5 – Chuck Winfield (Blood, Sweat & Tears)
- February 6 – Fabian Forte, teen idol singer
- February 8 – Creed Bratton (The Grass Roots)
- February 9 – Barbara Lewis, singer and songwriter
- February 14
  - Eric Andersen, singer-songwriter
  - Maceo Parker, saxophonist
- February 15 – Lal Waterson, folk singer-songwriter (died 1998)
- February 19 – Lou Christie, singer
- February 21 – David Geffen, record executive
- February 23 – Moshe Cotel, American composer and pianist (died 2008)
- February 25 – George Harrison, guitarist, singer and songwriter (The Beatles) (died 2001)
- February 26 – Paul Cotton, rock guitarist and singer-songwriter (Poco)
- February 27 – Morten Lauridsen, composer
- February 28 – Donnie Iris, American musician (The Jaggerz, Wild Cherry, Donnie Iris and the Cruisers)
- March 2 – George Benson, jazz guitarist
- March 7 – Chris White, rock guitarist, singer-songwriter and record producer (The Zombies)
- March 9 – David Matthews, composer
- March 14
  - Leroy "Sugarfoot" Bonner, American funk singer, guitarist and producer (Ohio Players) (died 2013)
  - Jim Pons, American rock guitarist and singer (The Turtles, The Mothers of Invention)
- March 15 – Sly Stone, musician, singer-songwriter and record producer (died 2025)
- March 18 – Dennis Linde, songwriter (died 2006)
- March 21 – Vivian Stanshall, English singer-songwriter (The Bonzo Dog Doo-Dah Band) (died 1995)
- March 22 – Keith Relf, British rock musician (The Yardbirds) (died 1976)
- March 25 – Royston Maldoom OBE, British choreographer
- March 29
  - Eric Idle, English actor, writer and songwriter
  - Vangelis, Greek-born musician and composer (died 2022)

=== April–June ===
- April 2 – Larry Coryell, jazz fusion guitarist (died 2017)
- April 3 – Richard Manuel, Canadian pianist and singer (The Band) (died 1986)
- April 7 – Mick Abrahams, guitarist (Jethro Tull)
- April 8 – Alfred "Uganda" Roberts, percussionist (died 2020)
- April 9 – Terry Knight, music producer, singer and songwriter (died 2004)
- April 11 – Tony Victor, vocalist (The Classics)
- April 20 – Sir John Eliot Gardiner, conductor
- April 26 – Gary Wright, singer-songwriter and keyboardist (Spooky Tooth) (died 2023)
- April 28
  - Jacques Dutronc, singer and composer
  - Sir Jeffrey Tate, conductor (died 2017)
- April 30 – Bobby Vee, singer (died 2016)
- May 4 – Sundar Popo, Indo-Trinidadian chutney musician (died 2000)
- May 7 – Terry Allen, American country music singer
- May 8 – Paul Samwell-Smith, blues rock bass guitarist and producer (The Yardbirds, Renaissance)
- May 9 – Bruce Milner, sunshine pop keyboardist (Every Mother's Son)
- May 11 – Les Chadwick, beat bass guitarist (Gerry and the Pacemakers) (died 2019)
- May 13 – Mary Wells, singer (died 1992)
- May 14
  - Jack Bruce, Scottish bass guitarist (Cream) (died 2014)
  - Derek Leckenby, English rock guitarist (Herman's Hermits) (died 1994)
- May 21
  - Vincent Crane, English keyboardist (Atomic Rooster, The Crazy World of Arthur Brown)
  - Hilton Valentine, English guitarist (The Animals) (died 2021)
- May 23 – Alan Walden, American businessman and manager, co-founder of Capricorn Records
- May 25 – Leslie Uggams, American singer
- May 26 – Levon Helm, American drummer and singer (The Band) (died 2012)
- May 27 – Cilla Black, singer and entertainer (died 2015)
- June 2 – Jimmy Castor, American disco/funk saxophonist (died 2012)
- June 8 – Şahan Arzruni, Armenian-born American pianist and musicologist (died 2026)
- June 14 – Muff Winwood (Spencer Davis Group), English musician, songwriter and record producer
- June 15 – Johnny Hallyday, French pop singer and actor (died 2017)
- June 17 – Barry Manilow, American singer, pianist, arranger and songwriter
- June 23 – James Levine, American conductor and pianist (died 2021)
- June 25 – Carly Simon, American singer-songwriter
- June 26 – Georgie Fame, English R & B musician
- June 27 – Tony Calder, English record promoter (died 2018)
- June 28 – Bobby Harrison, English drummer (Procol Harum) (died 2022)
- June 29 – Little Eva, American pop singer (died 2003)
- June 30 – Florence Ballard, American Motown R&B vocalist (The Supremes) (died 1976)

=== July–September ===
- July 1 – Jeff Wayne, American musician
- July 2 – Larry Lake, American-Canadian trumpet player and composer (died 2013)
- July 3 – Judith Durham, Australian folk pop singer (The Seekers) (died 2022)
- July 4
  - Conny Bauer, German jazz trombonist
  - Alan Wilson, American blues singer-songwriter (Canned Heat) (died 1970)
- July 5 – Robbie Robertson, Canadian folk rock songwriter and guitarist (The Band) (died 2023)
- July 7 – Toto Cutugno, Italian singer/songwriter (died 2023)
- July 12 – Christine McVie, English pop rock singer-songwriter and keyboardist (Fleetwood Mac) (died 2022)
- July 18
  - Robin MacDonald, pop guitarist (The Dakotas) (died 2015)
  - Bobby Sherman, American singer, actor and songwriter
- July 25 – Jim McCarty, English drummer and vocalist (The Yardbirds, Renaissance)
- July 26 – Mick Jagger, English rock singer and actor (The Rolling Stones)
- July 27 – Allan Ramsey, American rock bass guitarist (Gary Lewis & the Playboys) (died 1985)
- July 28
  - Mike Bloomfield, American guitarist/singer-songwriter and composer (The Electric Flag) (died 1981)
  - Richard Wright, English keyboardist and singer (Pink Floyd) (died 2008)
- August 2
  - Patrick Adiarte, American actor and dancer
  - Kathy Lennon, American singer (The Lennon Sisters)
- August 4 – David Carr, keyboardist (The Fortunes)
- August 10 – Ronnie Spector, singer (died 2022)
- August 11 – Denis Payton, saxophonist (The Dave Clark Five) (died 2006)
- August 19
  - Edwin Hawkins, American urban contemporary gospel musician (died 2018)
  - Billy J. Kramer, born William H. Ashton, English pop singer
- August 23 – Pino Presti, Italian musician and record producer
- August 24 – John Cipollina, American rock guitarist (Quicksilver Messenger Service) (died 1989)
- August 25 – Peter Bastian, Danish bassoonist (died 2017)
- August 26 – Dori Caymmi, Brazilian singer/songwriter
- August 28
  - Honey Lantree, drummer (The Honeycombs) (died 2018)
  - David Soul, singer and actor (died 2024)
- August 29 – Dick Halligan, rock musician (Blood, Sweat & Tears)
- September 2
  - Rosalind Ashford, R&B singer (Martha and the Vandellas)
  - Joe Simon, soul singer (died 2021)
- September 5 – Joe "Speedo" Frazier, doo-wop singer (The Impalas) (died 2014)
- September 6 – Roger Waters, English bass guitarist, singer and songwriter (Pink Floyd)
- September 11
  - Mickey Hart, American rock drummer (Grateful Dead)
  - Paul Riser, American musician
- September 12 – Maria Muldaur, singer
- September 16 – Joe Butler, rock singer (The Lovin' Spoonful)
- September 20 – Ted Neeley, actor and singer (Jesus Christ Superstar (film))
- September 23
  - Steve Boone, rock singer (The Lovin' Spoonful)
  - Julio Iglesias, singer
- September 25
  - Gary Alexander, pop musician (The Association)
  - John Locke, rock musician (Spirit)
- September 26 – Georgie Fame, R&B singer
- September 27 – Randy Bachman Canadian guitarist, singer and songwriter (The Guess Who, Bachman–Turner Overdrive)
- September 28 – Nick St. Nicholas, German-born rock musician (Steppenwolf)
- September 30 – Marilyn McCoo, singer (The 5th Dimension)

=== October–December ===
- October 1 – Jerry Martini (Sly & The Family Stone)
- October 5 – Steve Miller (Steve Miller Band)
- October 7 – Dino Valenti (Quicksilver Messenger Service)
- October 10 – Denis D'Ell (The Honeycombs)
- October 16 – Fred Turner, bassist (Bachman–Turner Overdrive)
- October 21 – Ron Elliott (The Beau Brummels)
- October 23 – Barbara Ann Hawkins (The Dixie Cups)
- October 24 – Dafydd Iwan, folk singer-songwriter and politician
- November 3 – Bert Jansch, folk musician (Pentangle) (died 2011)
- November 4 – Sundar Popo, Indo-Trinidadian chutney musician (died 2000)
- November 7 – Joni Mitchell, Canadian singer-songwriter
- November 12 – Brian Hyland, singer
- November 12 – John Maus, vocalist (The Walker Brothers)
- November 16 – Winifred Lovett (The Manhattans)
- November 28 – Randy Newman, singer-songwriter
- November 30
  - Leo Lyons (Ten Years After)
  - Rob Grill (The Grass Roots) (died 2011)
- December 6 – Mike Smith, singer-songwriter (The Dave Clark Five) (died 2008)
- December 8 – Jim Morrison, singer (The Doors) (died 1971)
- December 9 – Rick Danko (The Band) (died 1999)
- December 12
  - Dickey Betts (The Allman Brothers Band)
  - Dave Munden (The Tremeloes)
  - Grover Washington Jr., jazz-funk saxophonist (died 1999)
- December 16 – Tony Hicks, guitarist (The Hollies)
- December 18
  - Bobby Keys, saxophonist (died 2014)
  - Keith Richards, guitarist and songwriter (The Rolling Stones)
- December 23 – Harry Shearer, actor, musician (This Is Spinal Tap)
- December 27 – Peter Sinfield, British lyricist and producer (died 2024)
- December 28 – Chas Hodges, British rockney singer (Chas & Dave) (died 2018)
- December 30 – Rolf Gehlhaar, American composer
- December 31
  - John Denver, singer-songwriter (died 1997)
  - Peter Quaife, bassist (The Kinks) (died 2010)

== Deaths ==
- January 17 – Jane Avril, can-can dancer, 64
- February 5 – Sim Gokkes, Dutch composer, 45 (in Auschwitz concentration camp)
- February 7
  - Clara Novello Davies, singer, mother of Ivor Novello, 81
  - Sigrid Arnoldson, operatic soprano, 82
- February 17 – Armand J. Piron, jazz violinist, bandleader and composer, 54
- March 7 – Alma Moodie, violinist, 44 (drug overdose)
- March 8 – Alice Nielsen, Broadway performer and operatic soprano, 70
- March 19 – Abel Decaux, composer, 74
- March 28
  - Ben Davies, operatic tenor, 85
  - Sergei Rachmaninoff, composer, 69
- April 4 – David Roitman, hazzan and composer, 58
- April 12 – Edoardo Garbin, operatic tenor, 78
- April 21 – Josima Feldschuh, pianist and composer, 13 (tuberculosis)
- April 29 – Joseph Achron, violinist and composer, 56
- April 30 – René Blum, founder of the Ballet de l'Opera at Monte Carlo, 65 (in Auschwitz concentration camp)
- May 26 – Alice Tegnér, organist and composer, 77
- May 28 – Vaughn De Leath, US singer and radio pioneer, 48 (alcohol-related)
- June 16 – Sigrid Onégin, opera singer, 54
- June 26 – Ruby Elzy, African American soprano Porgy and Bess, 35 (post-operative complications)
- July 13 – Lorenzo Barcelata, songwriter, 44
- July 20 – Maria Gay, opera singer, 64
- September 1 – August Brunetti-Pisano, Austrian composer, 72
- September 7
  - Frank Crumit, US singer, 53
  - Karlrobert Kreiten, pianist, 27
- September 21 – Trixie Smith, blues singer, 48
- October 5 – Leon Roppolo, jazz musician, 41
- October 23 – Ben Bernie, US jazz violinist and bandleader, 52
- October 31 – Max Reinhardt, theatre director, 70
- November 22 – Lorenz Hart, lyricist, 48 (pneumonia)
- November 26 – Winnaretta Singer, musical patron, 78
- November 28 – Arthur Catterall, violinist, orchestra leader and conductor, 60
- December 15 – Fats Waller, jazz pianist and singer, 39 (pneumonia)
- December 18 – Joseph McCarthy, composer, 58
- date unknown
  - Max Bouvet, operatic baritone (born 1854)
  - Harry Kandel, bandleader (born 1885)
  - Erhard Wechselmann, baritone opera singer (born 1895?) (killed in Auschwitz concentration camp)
