= List of Harlem Hit Parade number ones of 1943 =

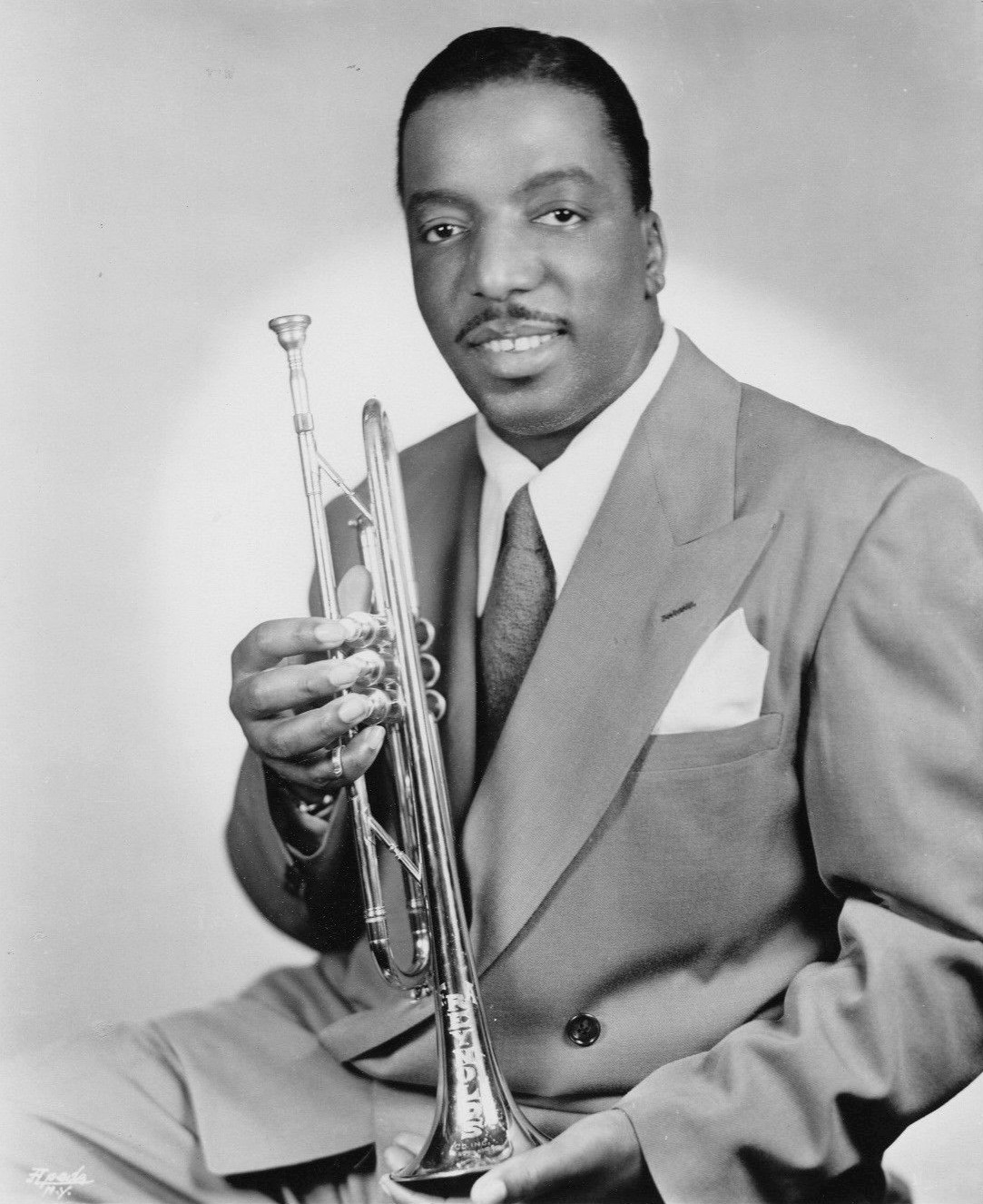
Erskine Hawkins and his orchestra had the year's longest-running chart-topper.

In 1943, Billboard magazine published a chart ranking the "most popular records in Harlem" under the title of the Harlem Hit Parade. Placings were based on a survey of record stores primarily in the Harlem district of New York City, an area noted for its African American population which has been called the "black capital of America". The chart is considered to be the start of the lineage of the magazine's multimetric R&B chart, which since 2005 has been published under the title Hot R&B/Hip Hop Songs.

Most of 1943's number ones were in the jazz and swing genres, which were among the most popular styles of music in the early 1940s. The year's longest-running chart-topper was "Don't Cry Baby" by Erskine Hawkins and his Orchestra, which spent a total of 14 non-consecutive weeks atop the chart between August and December. Two acts each achieved the feat of topping the chart with three different songs. Lucky Millinder and his Orchestra topped the listing with "When the Lights Go On Again", "Apollo Jump" and "Sweet Slumber", which was the final number one of 1943. Duke Ellington and his Famous Orchestra reached the top spot with "Don't Get Around Much Anymore", "A Slip of the Lip (Can Sink a Ship)" and "Sentimental Lady". The latter two songs were the two sides of the same record, but Billboard listed each in the number-one position for one week. Ellington's recording of "Don't Get Around Much Anymore" was one of two versions of the song to top the chart during 1943; the Ink Spots also reached number one with a vocal version of the track. Ellington had originally composed and recorded the track in 1940 as an instrumental with the title "Never No Lament", but it was re-titled and re-released after other artists recorded a vocal version with lyrics written by Bob Russell.

Louis Jordan and his Tympany Five topped the chart for the first time in 1943 with "What's the Use of Getting Sober (When You Gonna Get Drunk Again)"; Jordan would go on to be by far the most successful artist of the 1940s on Billboard's R&B charts. His tally of 18 chart-toppers was a record which would stand until the 1980s, and he spent 113 weeks at number one,^{[a]} a record which would still stand in the 21st century. His jump blues style was also a major influence on the later development of rock and roll. The King Cole Trio had two number ones in 1943, the first chart success for pianist and vocalist Nat King Cole, who would move on from the jazz field to become a hugely successful pop artist. Three of 1943's number ones had sufficient crossover appeal to also top Billboard's overall National Best Selling Retail Records chart, the forerunner of the modern Hot 100. The first was the year's first chart-topper, "White Christmas" by Bing Crosby with the Ken Darby Singers and John Scott Trotter and his Orchestra, which has remained a perennial favourite for more than 70 years and has been acclaimed by Guinness World Records as the world's best-selling single, with estimated sales in excess of 50 million copies worldwide. Later in the year, "I've Heard That Song Before" by Harry James and his Orchestra and "You'll Never Know" by Dick Haymes and the Song Spinners topped both listings. "You'll Never Know" was among a number of records released with a choral backing because the 1942–1944 musicians' strike prevented union musicians from making commercial recordings.

== Chart history ==
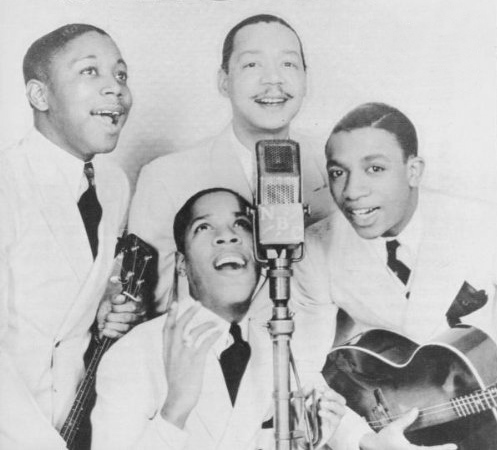
Vocal group the Ink Spots had two number ones in 1943.

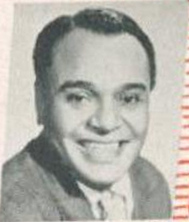
Lucky Millinder led his orchestra to three chart-toppers.

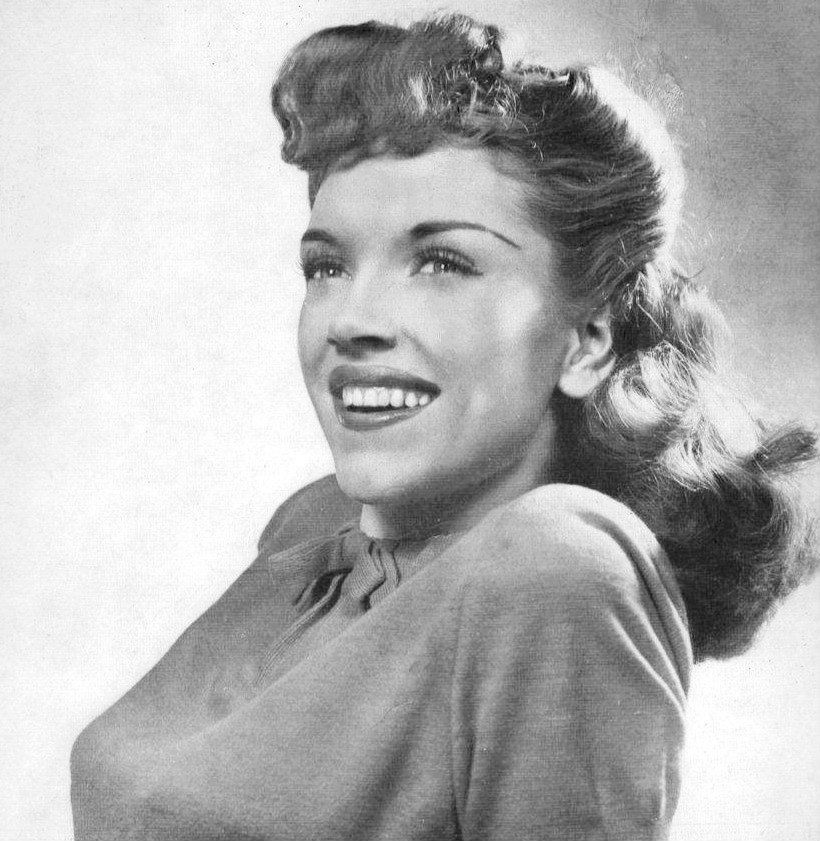
Ella Mae Morse topped the chart in December with "Shoo-Shoo Baby".

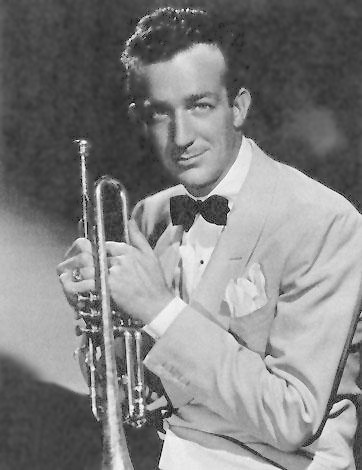
"I've Heard That Song Before" was a number one for Harry James and his Orchestra.

Chart history
| Issue date | Title | Artist(s) | Ref. |
|---|---|---|---|
| January 2 | "White Christmas" | Bing Crosby with the Ken Darby Singers and John Scott Trotter and his Orchestra | |
| January 9 | "When the Lights Go On Again" | Lucky Millinder and his Orchestra | |
| January 16 | "See See Rider Blues" | Bea Booze | |
| January 23 | "What's the Use of Getting Sober (When You Gonna Get Drunk Again)" | Louis Jordan and his Tympany Five | |
| January 30 | "That Ain't Right" | King Cole Trio | |
| February 6 | "See See Rider Blues" | Bea Booze | |
| February 13 | "Apollo Jump" | Lucky Millinder and his Orchestra | |
| February 20 | "Apollo Jump" | Lucky Millinder and his Orchestra | |
| February 27 | "See See Rider Blues" | Bea Booze | |
| March 6 | "Don't Stop Now" | Bunny Banks Trio | |
| March 13 | "Don't Stop Now" | Bunny Banks Trio | |
| March 20 | "Don't Stop Now" | Bunny Banks Trio | |
| March 27 | "Don't Get Around Much Anymore" | The Ink Spots | |
| April 3 | "Don't Stop Now" | Bunny Banks Trio | |
| April 10 | "Don't Stop Now" | Bunny Banks Trio | |
| April 17 | "I've Heard That Song Before" | Harry James and his Orchestra | |
| April 24 | "I Can't Stand Losing You" | The Ink Spots | |
| May 1 | "I Can't Stand Losing You" | The Ink Spots | |
| May 8 | "Don't Get Around Much Anymore" | The Ink Spots | |
| May 15 | "I Can't Stand Losing You" | The Ink Spots | |
| May 22 | "See See Rider" | Bea Booze | |
| May 29 | "Don't Get Around Much Anymore" | Duke Ellington and his Famous Orchestra | |
| June 5 | "I Can't Stand Losing You" | The Ink Spots | |
| June 12 | "Don't Get Around Much Anymore" | Duke Ellington and his Famous Orchestra | |
| June 19 | "I Can't Stand Losing You" | The Ink Spots | |
| June 26 | "I Can't Stand Losing You" | The Ink Spots | |
| July 3 | "I Can't Stand Losing You" | The Ink Spots | |
| July 10 | "Don't Get Around Much Anymore" | Duke Ellington and his Famous Orchestra | |
| July 17 | "You'll Never Know" | Dick Haymes and the Song Spinners | |
| July 24 | "You'll Never Know" | Dick Haymes and the Song Spinners | |
| July 31 | "You'll Never Know" | Dick Haymes and the Song Spinners | |
| August 7 | "You'll Never Know" | Dick Haymes and the Song Spinners | |
| August 14 | "Don't Cry Baby" | Erskine Hawkins and his Orchestra | |
| August 21 | "Don't Cry Baby" | Erskine Hawkins and his Orchestra | |
| August 28 | "Don't Cry Baby" | Erskine Hawkins and his Orchestra | |
| September 4 | "Don't Cry Baby" | Erskine Hawkins and his Orchestra | |
| September 11 | "Don't Cry Baby" | Erskine Hawkins and his Orchestra | |
| September 18 | "Don't Cry Baby" | Erskine Hawkins and his Orchestra | |
| September 25 | "A Slip of the Lip (Can Sink a Ship)" | Duke Ellington and his Famous Orchestra | |
| October 2 | "Sentimental Lady" | Duke Ellington and his Famous Orchestra | |
| October 9 | "Don't Cry Baby" | Erskine Hawkins and his Orchestra | |
| October 16 | "Don't Cry Baby" | Erskine Hawkins and his Orchestra | |
| October 23 | "Don't Cry Baby" | Erskine Hawkins and his Orchestra | |
| October 30 | "Don't Cry Baby" | Erskine Hawkins and his Orchestra | |
| November 6 | "Don't Cry Baby" | Erskine Hawkins and his Orchestra | |
| November 13 | "Don't Cry Baby" | Erskine Hawkins and his Orchestra | |
| November 20 | "All for You" | King Cole Trio | |
| November 27 | "Don't Cry Baby" | Erskine Hawkins and his Orchestra | |
| December 4 | "All for You" | King Cole Trio | |
| December 11 | "Don't Cry Baby" | Erskine Hawkins and his Orchestra | |
| December 18 | "Shoo-Shoo Baby" | Ella Mae Morse | |
| December 25 | "Sweet Slumber" | Lucky Millinder and his Orchestra | |

== Notes ==
a. Jordan's first 16 number ones occurred at a time when Billboard published only one R&B chart. His final two number ones occurred during a period when the magazine published two charts and each topped both listings, but the figure of 113 weeks at number one does not double-count weeks when he topped both.
