= Johnny Zero (disambiguation) =

Johnny Zero may refer to:

- Johnny Zero, a nickname of John D. Foley (1918–1999) an American military pilot who served in the United States Army Air Forces as a gunner during World War II
- "Johnny Zero" (song), a 1943 song originally "Johnny Got a Zero by Mack David and Vee Lawnhurst. Song inspired by pilot John D. Foley. It was made popular by The Song Spinners.
- Johnny Cypher in Dimension Zero, an American animated television series originally airing from 1967 to 1968
