= Don't Stop Now (disambiguation) =

"Don't Stop Now" is a 2007 song by Crowded House.

Don't Stop Now may also refer to:

- Don't Stop Now (Bonnie Davis song), 1943
- "Don't Stop Now", a song on the album Black & White by the Maine
- "Don't Stop Now", a novel by Julie Buxbaum
