= Herman Lubinsky =

American radio and music business executive (1896–1974)

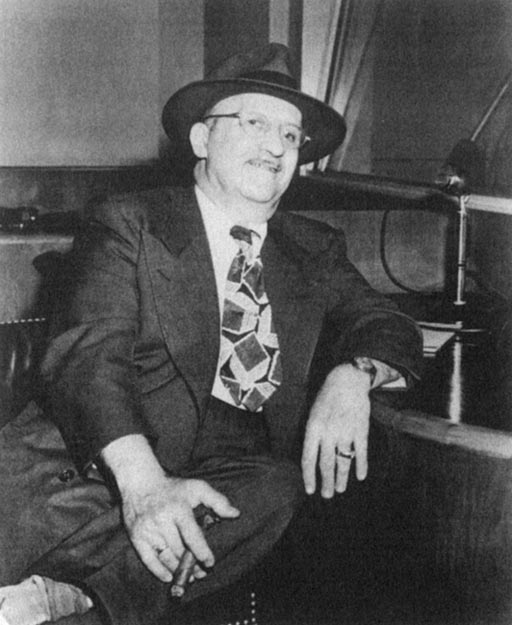
- Lubinsky in 1950
- Born: Hyman Lubinsky; August 30, 1896; Branford, Connecticut, U.S.
- Died: March 16, 1974 (aged 77); Newark, New Jersey, US
- Occupation(s): Music executive, record label owner, radio station owner
- Years active: 1922–1974
- Known for: Founder of Savoy Records
- Family: TJ Lubinsky, grandson

Herman Lubinsky (born Hyman Lubinsky; August 30, 1896 – March 16, 1974) was an American radio station and music business executive who founded Savoy Records in New York City in 1942.

== Career ==
Lubinsky was born to a Jewish family in Branford, Connecticut, (Note: Sources that give his birthplace as Bradford, Connecticut (which does not exist), or Bradford, England, are in error.) the son of Fannie (née Rosinsky; 1865–1941) and Louis Lubinsky (also known as Leuvinsky; 1857–1921), both of whom had emigrated from Russia in 1883.

By 1915, he was working as an electrical contractor in New Haven, before serving as a radio operator in the US Navy. In 1922, Lubinsky founded The Radio Shop of Newark, in Newark, New Jersey, and, in 1923, set up a radio station, WRAZ, which changed its title to WCBX and then, in October 1924, to WNJ.

The station operated from the attic of Lubinsky's home before its studio in Newark opened in 1925. The station became known as "The Voice of Newark" and presented programmes for immigrants to the New York metropolitan area in Polish, Lithuanian and Italian.

In 1929, Lubinsky set up the Radio Investment Co., but in November 1932 his application to renew the license for WNJ was refused by the Federal Radio Commission because he refused to accept limits on the station's bandwidth. Lubinsky fought the action in the courts, but the station was taken off the air in March 1933.

Lubinsky then started the United Radio Company, which sold and repaired radios and phonographs and began selling records. Encouraged by his friend Eli Oberstein, a music business executive, he launched Savoy Records in 1942 from his new Radio Record Shop. The company released jazz recordings made before the Petrillo Ban came into effect and also recordings made by musicians attempting to circumvent the ban by recording under pseudonyms. Among the latter was Bonnie Davis, whose recording of "Don't Stop Now" reached number 1 on the R&B chart in 1943. By 1944, the label had begun to release records by leading jazz musicians, such as Ben Webster and Lester Young, and over the next few years its roster of musicians expanded to include Charlie Parker, Dexter Gordon, Erroll Garner, Miles Davis, Paul Williams and Brownie McGhee.

After opening an office in California in 1948, Savoy continued to have success with such musicians as Johnny Otis, Little Esther Phillips, Cannonball Adderley and Big Maybelle, although after the mid-1950s it began to concentrate increasingly on gospel music, including Clara Ward, the Drinkard Singers, Alex Bradford, the Caravans, Dorothy Love Coates and the Original Gospel Harmonettes and James Cleveland. Lubinsky continued as head of the company until shortly before his death in Newark in 1974.

== Character and controversies ==
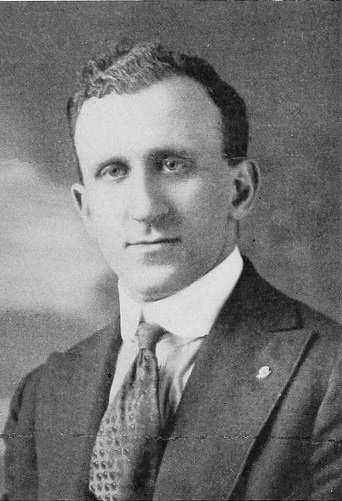
Lubinsky in 1923

Lubinsky has been described as "an arrogant bully... the quintessential loudmouth, overweight, cigar-smoking record man with little apparent charm"; as "a colorful character... endowed with a shrewd business sense"; and as "a rather profane cheapskate who had a low opinion of many of the musicians that he recorded" and who "was best known for his desire to cut expenses at all costs". His oldest daughter, Lois Grossberg, later said, "He was paranoid about money. It consumed him like a burning fire. He had a reputation as an ogre in the business. You have no idea of the cheapness."

The singer Little Jimmy Scott recorded for Savoy in the 1950s. He left the label in the early 1960s and recorded an album with Ray Charles for the latter's new label, Tangerine. However, Lubinsky claimed that Scott was under contract to him for his lifetime. The record was withdrawn. As a result, Scott retreated from the recording industry until after Lubinsky's death.

== See also ==
- TJ Lubinsky, grandson
