= TJ Lubinsky =

American television, radio and digital media host (b. 1972)

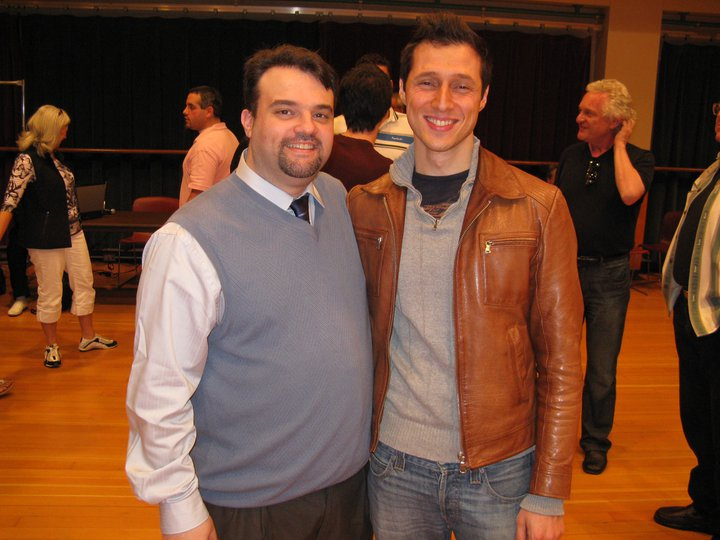
- Lubinsky on the left, with Jordi Majó, the main vocalist of the Spanish doo wop band The Earth Angels in 2010
- Born: Terry James Lubinsky; March 24, 1972 (age 54); Bradley Beach, New Jersey U.S.
- Occupations: broadcast producer and director, radio host, TV host, digital media host
- Known for: TV music programs on PBS
- Spouse: Wendy Lawton
- Family: Herman Lubinsky

Terry James Lubinsky is an American television, radio and digital media host known for his association with oldies and Motown music. He is also creator, executive producer and director of Public Broadcasting Service pledge-drive programs. He presents oldies-format music programs airing on PBS to tell the stories behind the "songs of yesteryear".

== Background ==
Lubinsky was born in Bradley Beach, New Jersey and grew up in nearby Ocean Grove. His grandfather, Herman Lubinsky, Sr., founded Savoy Records in Newark, and introduced acts that would be influential in modern popular music (Doo-Wop, Motown, disco and Top 40). Lubinsky, Sr. founded and operated New Jersey's first radio station WNJ. His uncle, "Buzzy", was also a well-known club disc jockey in New Jersey.

=== Production career ===
At 16, Lubinsky obtained his General Equivalency Diploma and accepted his first television job at Monmouth Cable TV-34 in New Jersey, where he learned television production. He worked on different news, studio, and sport remotes that served 31 towns, boroughs and municipalities along the Jersey Shore.

When he turned 22, Lubinsky was offered a job to work for PBS in South Florida. Later he was promoted and relocated to Pittsburgh, Pennsylvania. In 1999, Lubinsky blended his passion for Doo-Wop, Motown, classic Philly Soul, and '60s Rock and Roll oldies into one of PBS's most successful fundraisers, "Doo-Wop '50". He would go on to produce over 75 national television specials from PBS which archive America's soundtrack from the '50s, '60s and '70s through his "My Music" series.

=== Doctor Who ===
He helped bring several episodes of Doctor Who to the United States which had not been shown in the country before. In 2003-2005, he also archived and restored several introductions made for the American broadcast of Doctor Who episodes from the Tom Baker era, with voice-overs by Howard Da Silva. These were included on the BBC DVD releases.

=== Later career ===
Lubinsky spent four years as host and DJ on the WJRZ-FM Sunday Night Request Show, where he hosted five live hours by request through 2009, when the station flipped formats to Adult Contemporary. In July 2013, Lubinsky returned to a weekly Sunday night program on WJRZ. Lubinsky ended his WJRZ radio program in 2014 to help care for his father, Herman Lubinsky, Jr. prior to his passing. In 2015, Lubinsky produced a rerelease of Motown 25, a 1983 program for public television. In April 2016, Lubinsky returned to radio for New Jersey station Oldies 1079, WOLD-LP and online and around the world at woldradio.com. Lubinsky can now be found most Wednesday and Friday nights from 9 PM to 12 AM EST on Mixcloud.

== TJ Lubinsky PBS television productions ==
1999 - Doo Wop 50 (co-host/creator/producer)
2000 - More Doo Wop 50 (co-host/creator/producer)
2000 - Doo Wop 51 (co-host/creator/producer)
2001 - More Doo Wop 51 (co-host/creator/producer)
2000 - Rock, Rhythm, and Doo Wop (co-host/creator/producer)
2000 - More Rock, Rhythm and Doo Wop (co-host/creator/producer)
2001 - This Land Is Your Land (co-host/creator/executive producer)
2001 - The Ed Sullivan Show (co-host/executive producer, 120 Public TV Episodes)
2001 - The Sound Of Pittsburgh (co-host/creator/executive producer)
2001 - Soul and Inspiration (co-host/creator/producer)
2002 - R&B 40 (co-host/creator/executive producer)
2002 - Timeless Music (co-host/creator/executive producer)
2002 - Red, White and Rock (co-host/creator/executive producer)
2003 - This Land Is Our Land (co-host/creator/producer)
2003 - Rock and Roll 50 (co-host/creator/producer)
2003 - Rhythm, Love and Soul (co-host/creator/executive producer)
2003 - 70s Soul Superstars (co-host/creator/executive producer)
2004 - Magic Moments: The Best of 50s Pop (co-host/creator/executive producer)
2004 - Get Down Tonight - Disco (co-host/creator/executive producer/director)
2005 - Motown - Early Years (co-host/creator/executive producer/director)
2005 - Funky Soul Superstars (co-host/creator/executive producer/director)
2005 - 60s Experience (co-host/creator/executive producer/director)
2005 - Doo Wop Anthology (co-host/creator/executive producer/director)
2005 - Moments To Remember (co-host/creator/executive producer/director)
2006 - Movie Songs (co-host/creator/executive producer/director)
2006 - Country Pop Legends (creator/executive producer/director)
2006 - The British Beat (co-host/creator/executive producer/director)
2006 - The 70s (co-host/creator/executive producer/director)
2006 - Doo Wop's Best on PBS (co-host/creator/executive producer/director)
2006 - 50s Pop Parade (co-host/creator/executive producer/director)
2006 - The 60s Experience (co-host/creator/executive producer/director)
2007 - Doo Wop Love Songs (co-host/creator/executive Producer/director)
2008 - My Music: My Generation - The 60s (co-host/executive producer/director)
2008 - That's Amore!: Italian-American Favorites (co-host/creator/executive producer)
2008 - My Music: Love Songs of the '50s and '60s (co-host/creator/executive producer)
2009 - Ed Sullivan's Rock and Roll Classics: The 60s (co-host/executive producer/director)
2009 - My Music: Motown Memories (TV movie) (co-host/executive producer/director)
2009 - My Music: The Big Band Years (TV movie) (co-host/executive producer/director)
2010 - My Music: John Sebastian Presents Folk Rewind (co-host/executive producer/director)
2010 - My Music: Aretha Franklin Presents Soul Rewind (co-host/executive producer/director)
2010 - My Music: When Irish Eyes Are Smiling (co-host/executive producer/director)
2011 - My Music: '60s Pop, Rock & Soul (co-host/executive producer/director)
2011 - My Music: Rock, Pop & Doo Wop (co-host/executive producer/director)
2012 - My Music: Burt Bacharach's Best (co-host/executive producer/director)
2012 - My Music: Doo Wop Discoveries (co-host/creator/executive producer/director)
2012 - My Music: Big Band Vocalists (co-host/executive producer/director)
2013 - My Music: Classical Rewind (co-host/creator/executive producer/director)
2013 - 60s Girl Grooves (co-host/creator/executive producer/director)
2013 - 70s and 80s Soul Rewind (co-host/creator/executive producer/director)
2013 - The Carpenters: Close To You (co-host/reformat editor/director)
2013 - Hullabaloo - A 60s Flashback (co-host/executive producer/director)
2014 - Rock Rewind '65-'67 (co-host/creator/executive producer/director)
2014 - 50s and 60s Rock Rewind (co-host/executive producer/creator/director)
2014 - Party Songs (co-host/creator/executive producer/director)
2015 - As Time Goes By: Songbook Standards (co-host/executive producer/director)
2015 - Classical Rewind II (co-host/creator/executive producer/director)
2015 - Starlight Ballroom (co-host/creator/executive producer/director)
2015 - Sister Acts (co-host/creator/executive producer/director)
2015 - 60s and 70s Slow Songs (co-host/creator/executive producer/director)
2015 - My Yearbook '60-'63 (co-host/creator/executive producer/director)
2016 - Summer, Surf & Beach Music We Love (co-host/creator/executive producer/director)
2016 - Carol Burnette's Favorite Sketches (co-host/creator/executive producer/director)
2016 - Favorite Love Songs (co-host/creator/executive producer/director)
2017 - The 80s (co-host/executive producer/director)
2017 - Rock Rewind '67-'69 (co-host/creator/executive producer/director)
2018 - My Music: Doo Wop Generations (host/creator/producer/director)
2018 - Dionne Warwick: Then Came You (co-host/creator/executive producer/director)
2018 - Perry Como: Till The End Of Time (co-host/creator/executive producer/director)
2019 - A Classic Christmas (co-host/creator/executive producer/director)
2019 - Aretha Franklin Remembered (host/creator/executive producer/director)
2019 - Story Songs (host/creator/executive producer/director)
2019 - Nat King Cole's Greatest Hits (co-host/creator/executive producer/director)
2020 - Dolly Parton: I Will Always Love You (creator/executive producer/director)
2020 - Andy Williams Greatest Love Songs (creator/executive producer/director)
2022 - Doo Wop, Pop & Soul Generations (host/creator/executive producer/director)
