= Leopoldo Querol =

Valencian pianist, composer and musicologist (1899–1985)

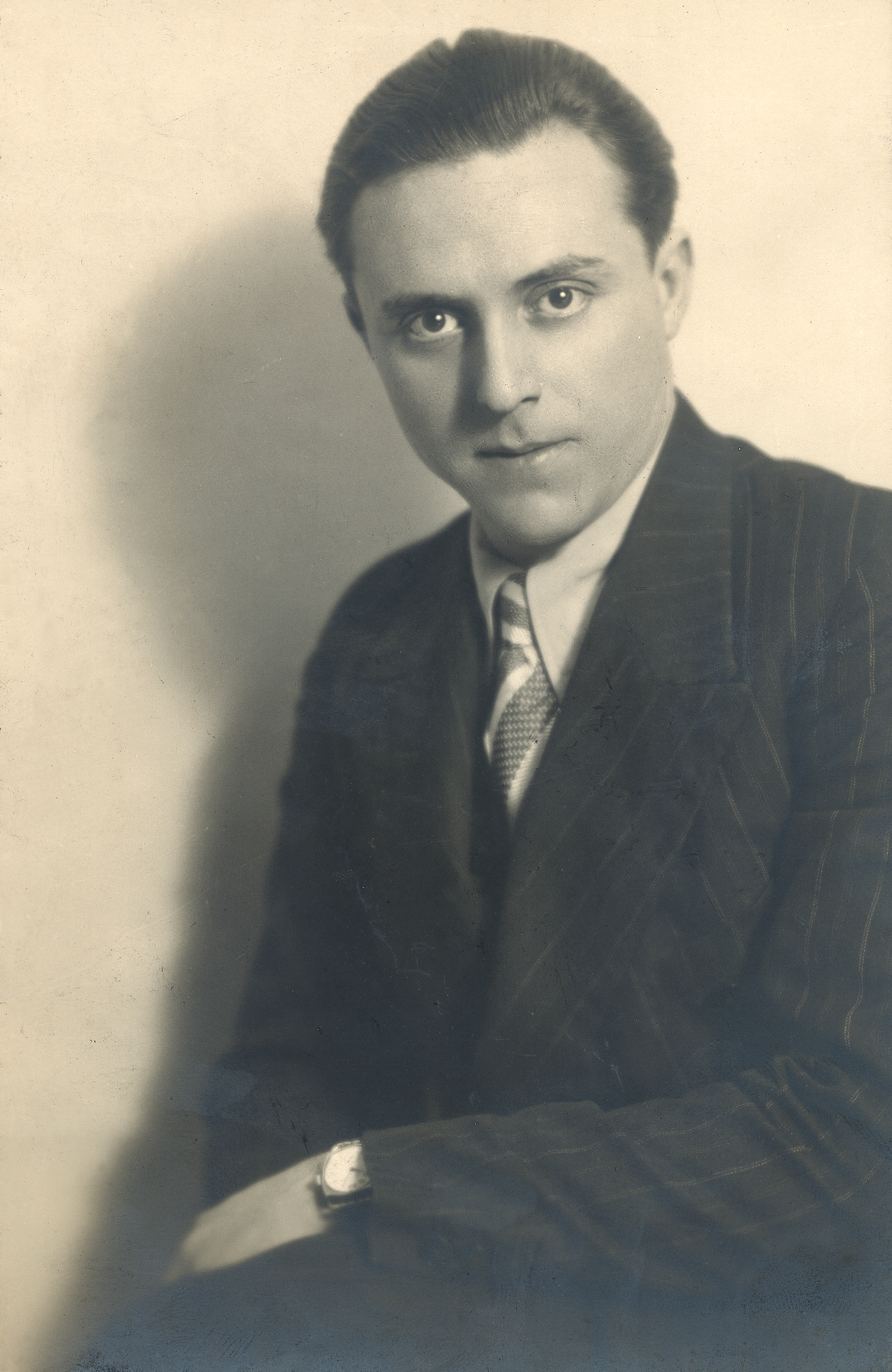
Leopoldo Querol

Leopoldo Querol (November 15, 1899 – August 26, 1985) was a Spanish classical pianist.

Querol was born in Vinaròs, Castellón in 1899. He was a graduate of the Valencia Conservatory.

In 1936 he was the soloist at the premiere of Federico Elizalde's Sinfonia Concertante for piano and orchestra, conducted by the composer. He also premiered Elizalde's Piano Concerto in 1947 in Paris.

The Concierto heroico for piano and orchestra (1935–43) by Joaquín Rodrigo was composed for him.

He died in Benicàssim, Castellón in 1985, aged 85.
