= Boyhood's End =

Boyhood's End is a cantata for tenor and piano composed by Michael Tippett in 1943, based on text by William Henry Hudson. Tippett wrote the piece for Peter Pears and Benjamin Britten, whose talent had impressed him during a rehearsal for My Beloved Spake. Pears and Britten performed Boyhood's End in June 1943 at Morley College; it was given its premiere, perhaps by someone else, on May 24 that year.
