= A Fellow on a Furlough =

Song
- Published: 1943
- Songwriter(s): Bobby Worth

A Fellow on a Furlough is a World War II song written by Bobby Worth in 1943 and published by House of Melody.

The chorus states, "He's just a fellow on a furlough / Whose hopes have all come true / The girl of his furlough dream is you."

The song is performed by Bob Crosby in the 1944 film Meet Miss Bobby Socks.
