= John D. Foley =

American bomber gunner in World War II

- Military career
- Allegiance: United States
- Branch: United States Army Air Forces
- Units: 22nd Bomb Group; 93rd Bombardment Group, 309th Bomber Squadron
- Conflicts: World War II

John D. Foley (March 1, 1918 – December 21, 1999), served in the United States Army Air Forces as a gunner during World War II. He was the inspiration of the popular 1943 song "Johnny Got a Zero".

== Biography ==
Foley enlisted in November 1941. After the attack on Pearl Harbor, he was assigned to a non-combat role with the 22nd Bomb Group stationed in Australia. His diligent cleaning of the machine guns of a Martin B-26 Marauder caught the attention of the bomber's pilot, Lieutenant Walter Krell. As the top turret gunner was injured, Foley became his replacement, despite having no aerial-gunnery training.

After a quick introduction to the equipment and procedures and one practice mission, Foley found himself on his first combat mission two days later, a raid against shipping near Rabaul on May 24, 1942. He shot down an Mitsubishi A6M Zero, even though he had not even been taught how to use the gunsight. Two weeks later, he was credited with two more over Lae. International News Service war correspondent Pat Robinson wrote an article about him and dubbed him "Johnny Zero".

The song "Johnny Got a Zero" was released as sheet music in 1943, lyrics by Mack David and music by Vee Lawnhurst, and topped out at #4 on the Variety list for the week of April 28. An a cappella rendition by The Song Spinners, "Johnny Zero", stayed on Billboard magazine's charts from June to August, peaking at #7. In the song, Johnny does poorly in school, with the other children mocking him with "Johnny got a zero" every time he fails a test. However, when he grows up and becomes a fighter pilot, the words take on an entirely different meaning.

Foley flew on 31 more missions in the Pacific War, sharing credit for at least six confirmed victories and surviving three crashes (in the second, he was the sole survivor). After contracting malaria, he was sent back to the United States in 1943 to undertake a promotional tour and become a gunnery instructor.

He applied to fight in Europe, and flew another 31 missions in only 60 days with the 309th Bomber Squadron as a gunner in a Consolidated B-24 Liberator. He volunteered for a third tour of duty, but the war ended.

He died on December 21, 1999, at the age of 81 in Banning, California.
