= A Slip of the Lip (Can Sink a Ship) =

"A Slip of the Lip " is 1942 song, performed by Duke Ellington and His Famous Orchestra. The single (Victor 20–1528), sung by Ray Nance and featuring a cornet solo by Nance as well as an alto solo by Johnny Hodges, hit number one on the US Billboard Harlem Hit Parade chart for one week. The track was written by Mercer Ellington and Luther Henderson. Duke Ellington and his Orchestra made a very similar recording of this song in November 1943 for World Transcriptions.
