= Johnny Got a Zero =

1943 song by Vee Lawnhurst, lyrics by Mack David

"Johnny Got a Zero" (alternatively "Johnny Zero") is a 1943 popular song inspired by John D. Foley, who served in the United States Army Air Forces as a gunner during World War II and was popularly known as Johnny Zero.

In the song, Johnny does poorly in school, with the other children mocking him with "Johnny got a zero" every time he fails a test. However, when he grows up and becomes a fighter pilot, his fellow pilots now cheer "Johnny got a zero" every time Johnny shoots down a Mitsubishi A6M "Zero", a Japanese fighter aircraft.

The song "Johnny Got a Zero" was released as sheet music in 1943, lyrics by Mack David and music by Vee Lawnhurst, and topped out at #4 on the Variety list for the week of April 28.

An a cappella rendition by The Song Spinners, "Johnny Zero", stayed on Billboard magazine's charts from June to August 1943, peaking at #7.
