= Sweet Slumber =

Song
- Released: 1943
- Songwriter(s): Lucky Millinder; Al J. Neiburg; Henri Woode

"Sweet Slumber" is a 1943 song written by Lucky Millinder, Al J. Neiburg and Henri Woode and recorded by Lucky Millinder and His Orchestra. The song, with vocals by Trevor Bacon, was successful on three charts. "Sweet Slumber" became Lucky Millinder's third number one on the Harlem Hit Parade and number fifteen on the pop charts. The song also peaked at number four on the Most Played Jukebox Hillbilly Records chart.

== See also ==
- List of Billboard number-one R&B singles of the 1940s
