= Viola Concerto (Gould) =

1943 Viola Concerto by Morton Gould

Morton Gould composed his Viola Concerto in 1943. The viola concerto had to wait for nearly a decade for its premiere, in a 1952 studio recording with Milton Katims and the NBC Symphony. It didn't receive its public premiere until 1983, when it was performed by Robert Glazer and the Louisville Orchestra led by Lawrence Leighton Smith.

The concerto lasts approximately 30 minutes and consists of three movements chained without a break. It is a lyrical composition with a distinct American character ending in a hoedown dance:

1. Moderately fast with rhapsodic vigor and drive —
2. Slowly with lyrical dignity — Cadenza —
3. Dance (fast, with lusty verve and gusto)
