= Sigrid Arnoldson =

Swedish opera singer

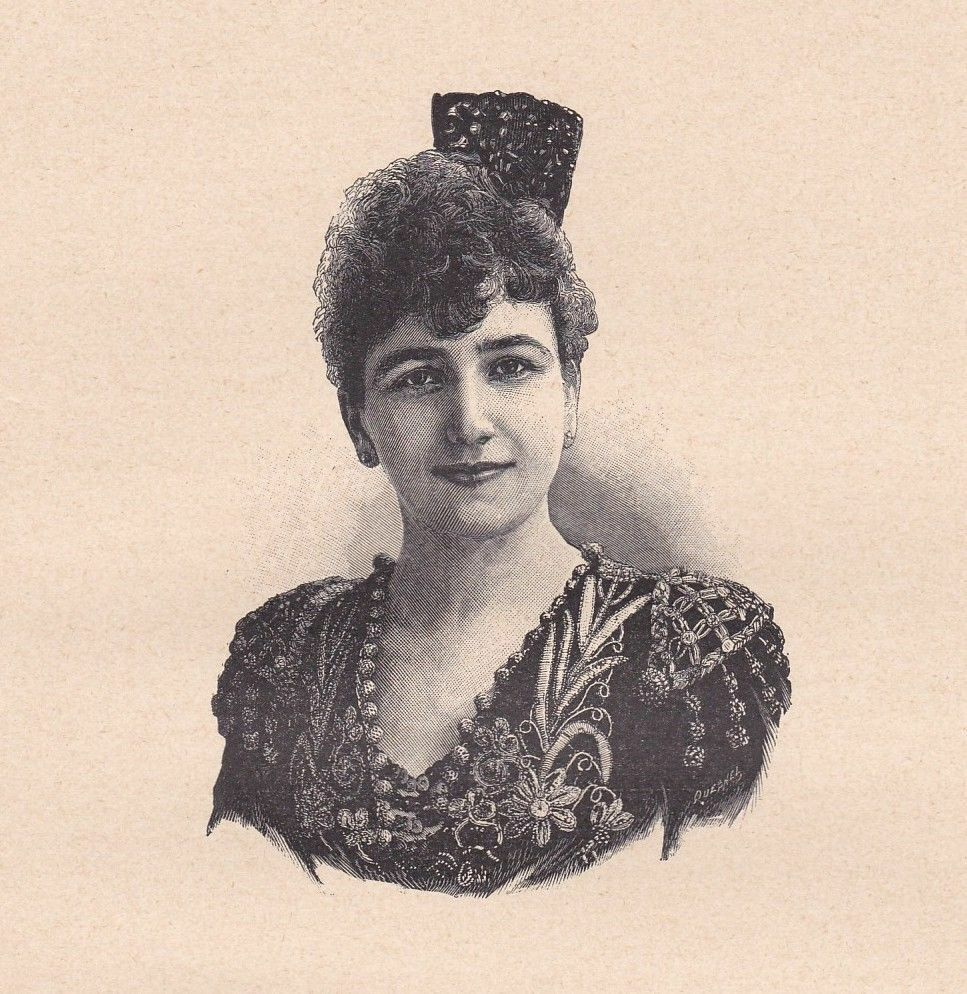
Sigrid Arnoldson (1897)

Sigrid Arnoldson (20 March 1861 – 7 February 1943) was a Swedish opera singer with an active international career at the end of the 19th century and into the 20th. Possessing a fine dramatic coloratura soprano voice with a range of three octaves, music critics believed she was Jenny Lind's successor and dubbed her "the new Swedish Nightingale". Her voice is preserved on several recordings made in Berlin for the Gramophone Company between 1906 and 1910.

== Biography ==
Born in Stockholm, Arnoldson was taught by her father Carl Oskar Arnoldson, a respected tenor, and by Fritz Arlberg, a famous Swedish baritone. She later had further studies in Paris. She made her professional opera debut in 1885 at the Prague National Theatre as Rosina in Gioachino Rossini's The Barber of Seville. The part became her calling card at a number of important houses, including her first and very successful appearances at the Bolshoi Theatre in Moscow in 1886. That same year The Musical Times reported that Franz Liszt had predicted "a brilliant career" for her.

Arnoldson made her London debut in 1887 in Gioachino Rossini's The Barber of Seville at the Theatre Royal, Drury Lane along with Fernando de Lucia, Mattia Battistini and Edouard de Reszke. As Rosina, she was said to be "Young, pretty, and of engaging manner, with a good voice and method, and considerable talent as an actress" and to have "won public favour with the greatest of ease". Apart from a poorly received Zerlina (Don Giovanni) in 1887, her success there was considerable, and she was engaged to sing at the Royal Opera, Covent Garden in 1888 and again between 1892 and 1894. The Musical Times called her Cherubino (The Marriage of Figaro) "charming", and her work as George Fox's Nydia in the eponymous opera "a graceful impersonation"

She was engaged in 1890 by Max Strakosch for an American tour of some 60 concerts for the sum of 250,000 Francs. Her Barcelona debut at the Liceu in 1891 was reported as being "most enthusiastically received". She debuted at the Metropolitan Opera in New York as Baucis in Philémon et Baucis in 1893, despite the fact that in 1892 it had been reported that "her voice was smaller than ever".

In 1897 she is recorded as having sung two "hackneyed show pieces" at a Royal Philharmonic Society concert in London, which were "rapturously applauded" yet earlier that year she was appearing with "immense success" at the Mariinsky Theatre in Saint Petersburg in Italian opera. 1898 saw her giving a series of performances at the Berlin State Opera. As late as 1906 she achieved a "triumph" at the Opéra de Monte-Carlo in Anton Rubinstein's The Demon.

Arnoldson's other roles included Elsa from Richard Wagner's Lohengrin, Nedda in Pagliacci, Susanna in The Marriage of Figaro, Papagena in The Magic Flute, Oscar in Un ballo in maschera, Marguerite de Valois in Les Huguenots, and Sophie in Werther with Jean de Reszke. She also portrayed both Micaëla and the title heroine in Georges Bizet's Carmen. She sang the latter impersonation as a last-minute substitute for an indisposed Emma Calvé at Covent Garden in 1903. She had never sung the role before or ever intended to assail it onstage. She did, however, know the music, as she was accustomed to learning all the parts within the operas she sang in. The performance was later called by Gramophone her "solitary failure"; but given the circumstances of the performance that judgement seems ungenerous.

By 1910 Arnoldson was a member of the Royal Swedish Academy of Music. She retired from the stage in 1911, after which she taught singing in Vienna for over 25 years. She moved to Stockholm in 1938 where she continued to teach up until her death in 1943.
