= Bonnie Davis =

American R&B singer (1920–1976)

Background information
- Also known as: Melba Moorman
- Born: Gertrude Melba Smith; June 10, 1920; New Orleans, Louisiana, United States
- Died: August 1976 (age 56) New Jersey, United States
- Genres: R&B, jazz
- Occupation: Singer
- Years active: Late 1930s - early 1970s
- Labels: Savoy, Columbia, Decca, etc.
- Formerly of: Teddy Hill; The Piccadilly Pipers; Clem Moorman

Bonnie Davis (born Gertrude Melba Smith; June 10, 1920 – August 1976) was an American R&B singer. Her song "Don't Stop Now" reached number one on the R&B chart in 1943. She was the mother of singer Melba Moore.

== Biography ==
Davis was born Grtrude Melba Smith in New Orleans. Her family relocated to Bessemer, Alabama, when she was a child. At first she planned to become a school teacher. In the late 1930s she started working as a singer in New York, initially in saxophonist Teddy Hill's band. By early 1942, she had joined another band, the Piccadilly Pipers, based at the Piccadilly Club in Newark, New Jersey. The group comprised Clement Moorman (piano and vocals), Ernie Ransome (guitar and vocals), and Henry Padgette (bass).

She recorded several tracks with the trio, including "Don't Stop Now", for Herman Lubinsky, who had recently established Savoy Records. However, because of the "Petrillo Ban" which prevented union members from releasing records legitimately at the time, the release was credited to Bonnie Davis - a pseudonym for Smith - with the "Bunny Banks Trio" - a name disguising the actual musicians. On March 6, 1943, the record reached no.1 on the "Harlem Hit Parade", which was later renamed the R&B chart.

Several further records credited to Bonnie Davis (sometimes also nicknamed "The Oomph Girl") with the Bunny Banks Trio were issued by the Savoy label before, in 1945, the label reverted to using the name of the Piccadilly Pipers. The same year, Bonnie Davis and bandleader Teddy Hill had a daughter together; she was born Beatrice Hill, and later became known as singer Melba Moore. Soon after the birth, the couple separated. In 1950, Bonnie Davis and pianist Clem Moorman were married.

Davis and the Piccadilly Pipers left the Savoy label in 1946. They began releasing singles again in 1950, and over the next four years recorded for the Keystone, Columbia, Coral and Melmar labels. However, the records were not commercially successful. With Davis and Moorman as the core members, there were various personnel changes in the group: Ransome was replaced by Walter "Pinky" Smith, and Padgette by, firstly, Ed "Skeets" McKaine, and then James "Doc" Starkes, who was in turn succeeded by Brother Moncur. In 1955, Bonnie Davis began recording as a solo singer, at first for Decca Records and then various other labels including Tune Tone, who released an LP, All I Want Is You, credited to Bonnie & Clem, "The Aero-Dynamic Singers", in 1966.

Davis and Moorman continued to perform together in clubs as a duo until the early 1970s, when they divorced. She died in August 1976 in East Orange, New Jersey of cancer, and was buried at Holy Cross Cemetery in North Arlington, New Jersey.
