= Comin' in on a Wing and a Prayer =

- Sheet music cover

Song
- Published: 1943 by Robbins Music
- Genre: Foxtrot, Jazz
- Composer: Jimmy McHugh
- Lyricist: Harold Adamson

"Comin' in on a Wing and a Prayer" is a World War II song with lyrics by Harold Adamson and music by Jimmy McHugh, published in 1943 by Robbins Music Corp.

== Theme ==
The lyrics tell of the aftermath of an Allied night aerial bombing mission over enemy territory. One bomber has not returned, and the ground crew at its home airfield are becoming concerned. When they eventually establish radio contact, the pilot tells them that the mission has been a success ("we really hit our target for tonight"), but that the aircraft was badly damaged in combat and has lost one engine. The crew is nonetheless unharmed and in good spirits, sustained by their religious faith ("With our full crew aboard / And our trust in the Lord"), as the plane limps homeward, "on a wing and a prayer".

== Inspiration ==
Different incidents have been credited as the inspiration for the song. It is sometimes said to be based on the events of February 26, 1943, when "Southern Comfort", a B-17 Flying Fortress piloted by Hugh G. Ashcraft Jr. of Charlotte, North Carolina, was badly damaged by anti-aircraft fire on a bombing mission over mainland Europe. As it approached the British coast, Ashcraft told his crew over the radio: "Those who want to, please pray." The aircraft made it home safely. The song has also been associated with the similar survival against the odds, despite extensive damage, of another B-17, "Thunderbird", piloted by Lt. John Cronkhite, on a mission from Biskra, Algeria, over Tripoli on January 12, 1943.

== 1943 recording ==
The song was recorded by the Song Spinners for Decca Records, reaching number one on the Billboard pop chart on July 2, 1943.

"Comin' in on a Wing and a Prayer" was the only song with a war connection to appear in the top twenty best-selling songs of 1943 in the United States (although record sales in this period were heavily affected by the first Petrillo recording ban).

== Russian adaptation ==
The song also became widely known in the Soviet Union in a 1943 adaptation by the popular singer and jazz band leader Leonid Utyosov, titled "Bombers". The translation of the lyrics into Russian is broadly faithful, but the term "prayer" (with its unacceptable religious overtones) is rendered as "word of honor". This Russian idiom – на честном слове, or na ches[t]nom slove (т is not pronounced) – means "only just managing" or "just holding on".

== Legacy ==
The song is the origin of the English idiomatic phrase "a wing and a prayer", which alludes to reliance on hope in a desperate situation. Most immediately, it inspired the title of the 1944 war film, Wing and a Prayer, The Story of Carrier X.
