= Concierto heroico =

Composition by Joaquín Rodrigo

The Concierto heroico for piano and orchestra was composed by Joaquín Rodrigo for pianist Leopoldo Querol between 1935 and 1943.

Rodrigo began work on the concerto in 1935 and completed the first two movements before setting the work aside; having forgotten about it, he returned and completed it in 1945. The piece is called "heroic" because of the martial rhythms and fanfares of the first movement. Such touches were common to the era and were sometimes erroneously taken to suggest Rodrigo's support of Francisco Franco.

A modified version of the concerto, produced for Joaquín Achúcarro, was first performed in 1999; this removed two virtuosic cadenzas and balanced the relationship between the piano and orchestral parts.

== Movements ==
The piece is in four movements:

1. Allegro con brio
2. Scherzo (Allegro molto ma pesante)
3. Largo
4. Finale

A typical performance of the concerto lasts about 30 minutes.
