= Poema del Iguazú =

Orchestral composition

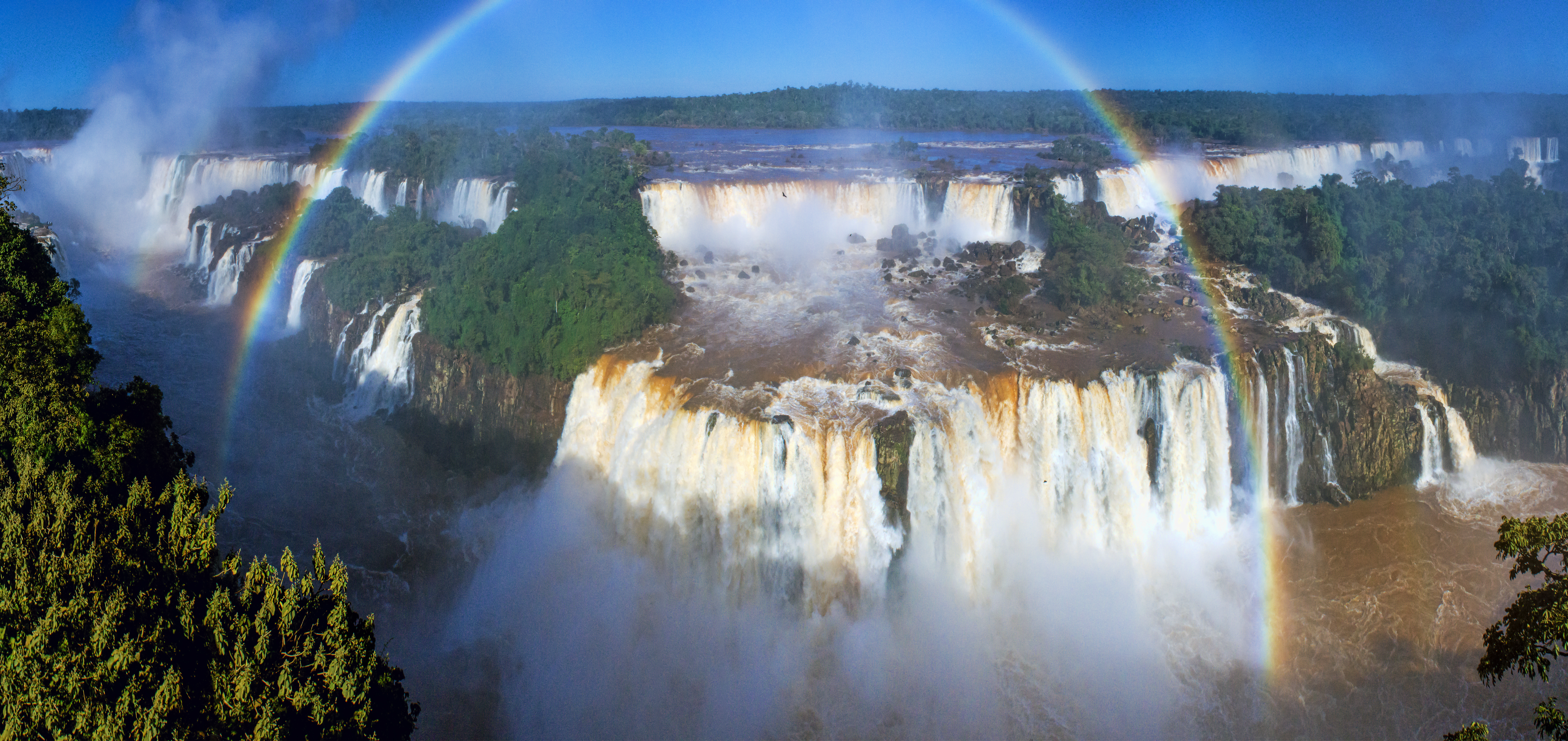
The Iguazú Falls

Poema del Iguazú, Op. 115, is an orchestral composition by the Argentine composer Alberto Williams.

== History ==
Poema del Iguazú was written in 1943, and is the last of three orchestral "poems" by Williams. Its earlier companions are Poema de las campanas, Op. 60 (Poem of the Bells, 1913), and Poema de los mares australes, Op. 88 (Poem of the Southern Seas, 1925). The first was originally composed for the piano in 1912, and was later joined by a series of eight more cycles of piano poemas, written between 1920 and 1933. After this time, Williams turned his attention mainly to the orchestra, composing in addition to the third symphonic poem six of his nine symphonies and two sets of orchestral milongas, Opp. 107 and 117.

Up until 1910, Williams's nationalism had been focused on the pampas and the gauchesco literature of the 19th century, epitomised by José Hernández's epic poem Martin Fierro (1872/79). In his later works he expanded his geographical attention to encompass all parts of the country. The piano poemas systematically cover the length and breadth of Argentine geography, from the Tierra del Fuego and Antarctica in the south—in the Poema fueguino, Op. 86, and Poema antártico, Op. 87, both composed in 1925—to the tropical north in the last two poemas: the Poema de la selva primaveral, Op. 93 (Poem of the vernal rainforest, 1933) for piano, and the orchestral Poema del Iguazú. The northernmost border between Argentina and Brazil is marked partly by the Iguazu River, which drops over the edge of a plateau to form the spectacular Iguazu Falls shortly before reaching the Paraná River. These falls are the subject of Williams's orchestral work.

== Form and style ==
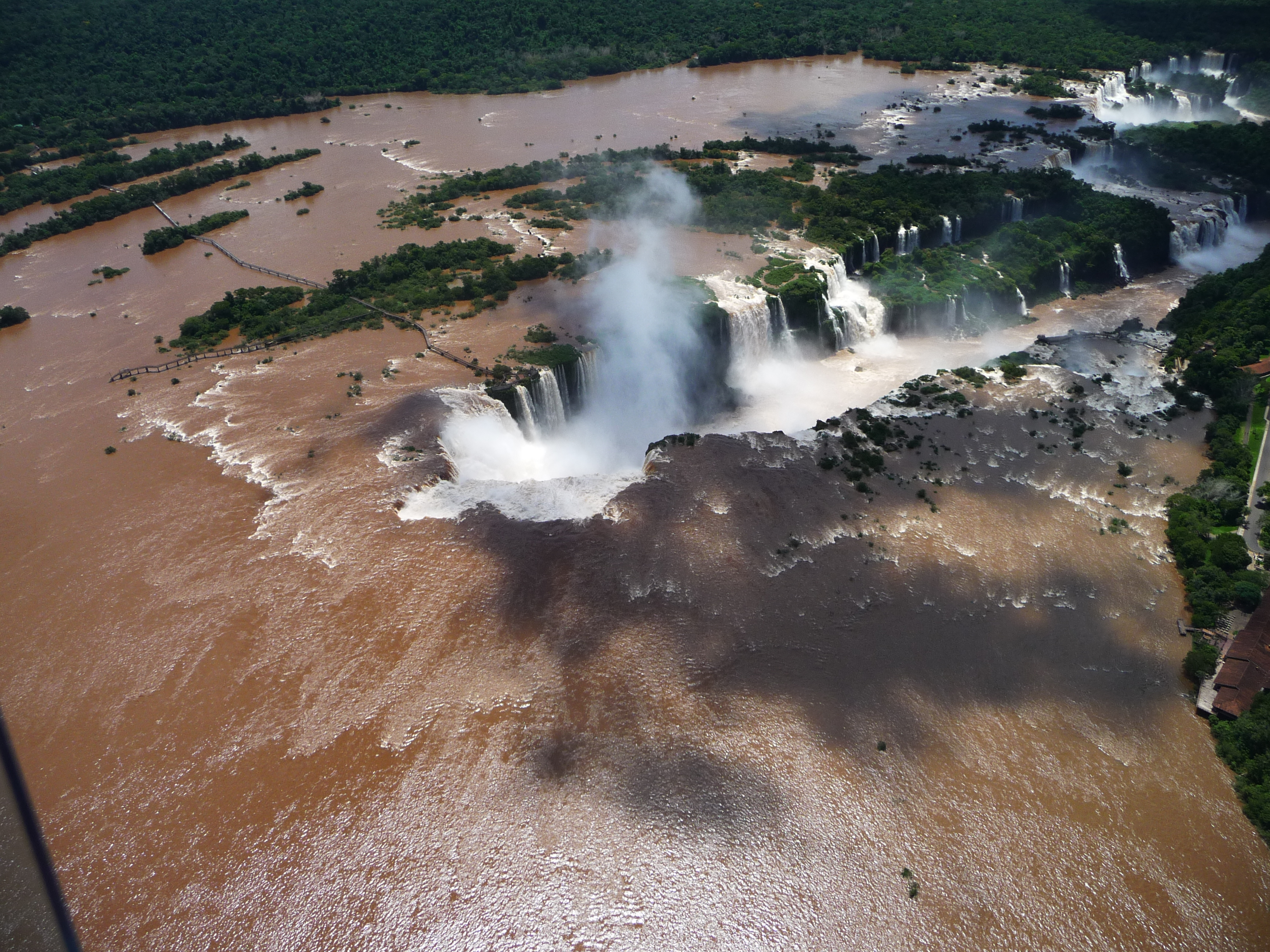
La garganta del diablo

The Poema is in four movements:

1. Las selvas dialogan con las cataratas (The Forests Converse with the Falls)
2. Barcarola del Iguazú (Barcarole of the Iguazú)
3. La luna ilumina las cascadas: Nocturno (The Moon Illuminates the Falls: Nocturne)
4. La garganta del diablo (The Devil's Throat)

(The "Devil's Throat" is the long and narrow chasm containing the highest and deepest of the falls.)

The work belongs to Williams's late phase, in which he expanded his Franckian harmonic vocabulary with a whole range devices from French Impressionism: parallel harmonies and consecutive fifths, pedal points, successions of unresolved seconds, superimposed tonalities, and, especially, episodes featuring whole-tone scales.

== Reception ==
The national movement initiated by Williams in 1890 had become the dominant trend in Argentina by the 1930s when Alberto Ginastera—who would become the leading figure of Argentine nationalism during the early part of his career—was a student at the conservatory bearing Williams's name. Despite this strong influence, Ginastera remembered that Williams's often exaggeratedly literal and localistic titles, such as "Icebergs Rocked by the Waves" or "Penguins Swimming" (the first two movements of the Poema fueguino) provoked mirth amongst his fellow students.

== Discography ==
- Alberto Williams. Symphony No. 7; Poema del Iguazú. Orquesta Filarmónica de Gran Canaria, Adrian Leaper (cond.), Anatoli Romanov (leader). Arte Nova Classics 74321 43329 2. [Munich]: Arte Nova Musikproduktions GmbH, 1997. Reissued as Arte Nova 433290. [Munich]: Arte Nova Musikproduktions GmbH, 2006.
