= Alberto Williams =

Argentine composer, pianist, and conductor

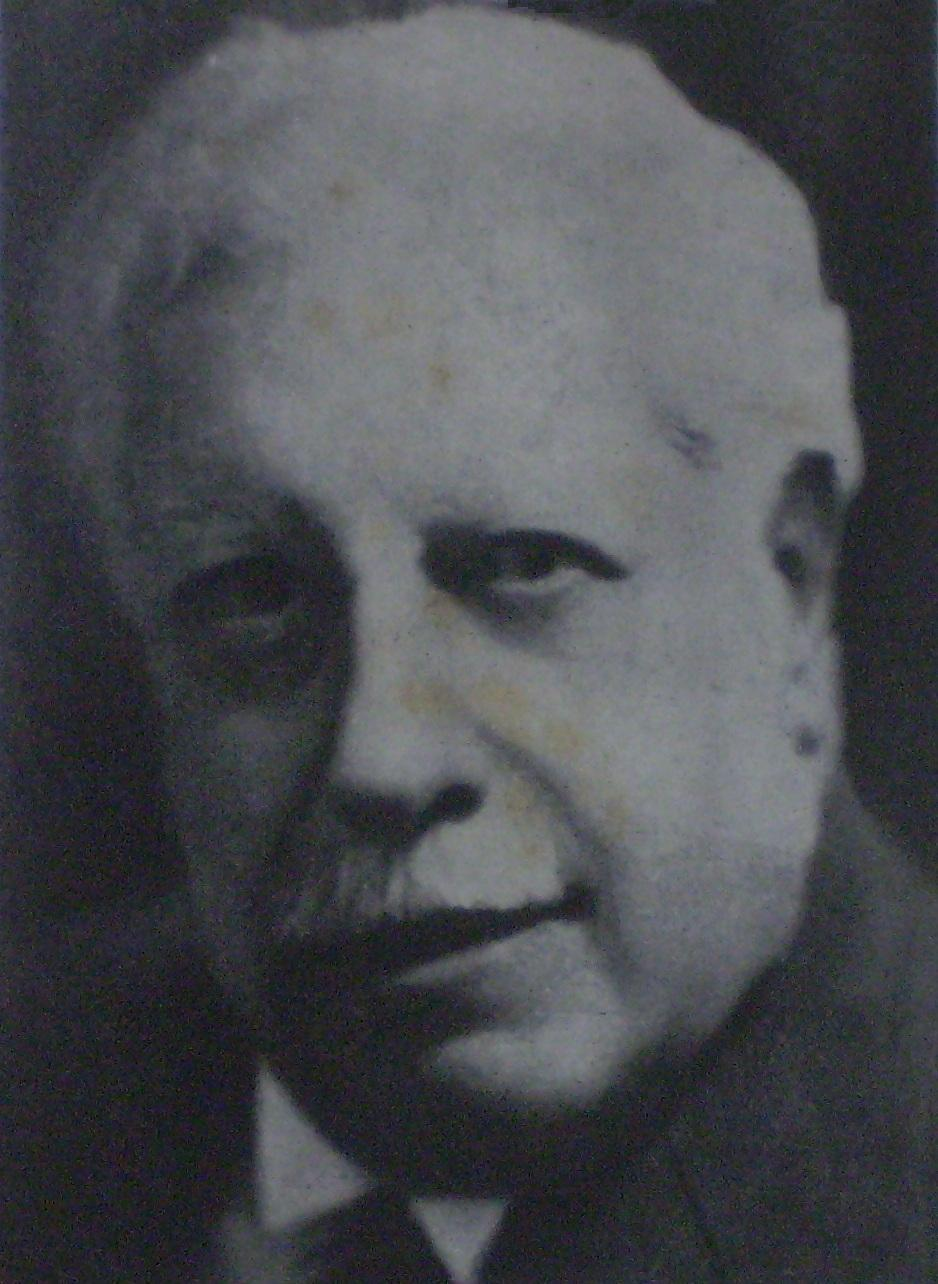
Composer Alberto Williams

Alberto Williams (23 November 1862 – 17 June 1952) was an Argentine composer, pianist, pedagogue, and conductor.

== Life and work ==
Alberto Williams was born in Buenos Aires, in 1862. His maternal grandfather, Amancio Jacinto Alcorta, had been a respected diplomat and economist, and an amateur composer of salon music. Williams began studying the piano at age 8 with Pedro Beck. Six years later, he entered the Escuela de Música y Declamación (School of Music and Recitation) of the Province of Buenos Aires, where he received piano lessons from Luis José Bernasconi.

He received a scholarship from the government of the Province of Buenos Aires in 1882 to study music composition at the Paris Conservatoire, where he was mentored by pianists Georges Mathias and Charles de Bériot, and learned harmony with Emile Durand and counterpoint with Ernest Guiraud. He furthermore took private lessons in composition from César Franck, who apparently became very fond of his student.

Williams published his first piano pieces during this period, including character and salon pieces and dances, and completed his Primera Obertura de Concierto (First Concert Overture, op. 15) for orchestra, before returning to Argentina in 1889. Upon arrival, he toured the rural pampas and became introduced to folk music of Argentina. His first composition to earn widespread success, "El Rancho Abandonado" (The Abandoned Hut), fourth number of a piano serie entitled En la Sierra (In Hill Country, op. 32, published in 1893) is a nostalgic lament of the rural life in the pampas, and includes a successful quotation of the Huella folk dance. In the 1890s and 1900, Williams mostly cultivated an international style strongly rooted in the Romantic tradition. After 1910, however, his compositions employed selected "Impressionistic" techniques and more dissonant harmonies without ever adopting a modernist (or avant-garde) aesthetic.

Around the same time, he resorted to Argentine folk themes and rhythms with increasing frequency, basing his piano and orchestral music upon adaptations of milongas, huellas and other rural genres. He founded the Buenos Aires Conservatory of Music (later known as Conservatorio Williams) in 1893, and established franchises in many cities and towns of the Argentine interior. His students included Celia Torra.

Williams composed nine symphonies, three orchestral poems, two concert overtures, three sonatas for violin and piano (1905, 1906, 1907), one for cello and piano (1906), and the Primera Sonata Argentina for piano (1917). He created lyrics for all his compositions and authored numerous texts on music theory and other aesthetic and historical topics, including several manuals for students; a collection of his lyrics was published as Versos Líricos in 1924. Williams was inducted into the National Academy of Fine Arts and National Commission for Culture.

Williams' catalog comprises 136 opus numbers. Some of the best-known are:

- Op.15. Primera obertura de concierto (1889)
- Op.18. Segunda obertura de concierto (1892)
- Op.30. Miniaturas: first suite (1890)
- Op.31. Miniaturas: second suite (1890)
- Op.32. En la Sierra (piano suite, 1890)
- Op.44. First Symphony, in B minor (1907)
- Op.55. "The Witch of the Mountains." Second Symphony, in C minor (1910)
- Op.56. Centennial March (1910)
- Op.58. "The Sacred Forest." Third Symphony, in F major (1911)
- Op.60. Poem for the Campaniles (1913)
- Op.63. Five Argentine Dances (1921)
- Op.88. Poem for the Southern Seas (1933)
- Op.98. "El ataja-caminos." Fourth Symphony, in E♭ major (1935)
- Op.100."The Doll's Heart." Fifth Symphony, in E♭ major (1936)
- Op.102."The Death of the Comet." Sixth Symphony, in B major (1937)
- Op.103."Eternal Rest." Seventh Symphony, in D (1937)
- Op.104."The Sphinx." Eighth Symphony, in F minor (1938)
- Op.107.Las milongas de la orquesta (1938)
- Op.108."Los batracios" (La humorística). Ninth Symphony, in B♭ (1939)
- Op.115. Poema del Iguazú (Poem of the Iguazú [Falls], 1943)
- Op.117."The Air in the Pampas". Milongas, 2 Suites (1944)
- Milongas: The Bartolomé Mitre March; First, Second, and Third Argentine Suites

He lived his final years surrounded by the admiration of his many students in the casa del puente (house of the bridge), a residence in Mar del Plata designed by his son, noted modernist architect Amancio Williams, and completed in 1946. Alberto Williams died in Buenos Aires in 1952, at age 89.
