= Apollo Jump =

"Apollo Jump" is an instrumental written by Lucius "Lucky" Millinder, Prince Robinson and Ernest Purce and recorded for Decca Records on July 29, 1942, by Lucky Millinder and His Orchestra. The single was Lucky Millinder's second number one on Billboard's Harlem Hit Parade chart and stayed at number one for two weeks in February 1943.

== See also ==
- List of Billboard number-one R&B singles of the 1940s
