= I Can't Stand Losing You =

"I Can't Stand Losing You" is a song written by The Ink Spots' lead tenor Bill Kenny while he was still in high school. In 1940, a few years after Kenny joined the group, they recorded the song for Decca Records, but it was not released until March 1943. The single was the group's second number-one on the Harlem Hit Parade, where it remained for seven non-consecutive weeks. The B-side was the song "I'll Never Make the Same Mistake Again".

== See also ==
- List of Billboard number-one R&B singles of the 1940s
