= Bea Booze =

Background information
- Born: Beatrice Booze; March 23, 1912; Baltimore, Maryland, United States
- Died: November 11, 1986 (aged 74) Scottsville, New York, United States
- Genres: R&B, jazz
- Occupations: Singer, musician
- Instruments: Vocals, guitar
- Years active: 1930s–1950s
- Label: Decca
- Formerly of: Sammy Price, Andy Kirk

Bea Booze (March 23, 1912 – November 11, 1986), often credited as Wee Bea Booze, was an American R&B and jazz singer most popular in the 1940s. She was one of the few female blues guitarists of that time.

== Biography ==
She was born Beatrice Booze in Baltimore, the daughter of Phillip and Lydia Booze. She made her name as a singer in Harlem, New York. Booze was signed by Decca Records to cover the songs and emulate the style of Lil Green and, under the guidance of Sammy Price, first recorded in 1942. Her version of "See See Rider Blues", first recorded by Ma Rainey, reached number 1 on the US Billboard R&B chart, after which she was billed as the "See See Rider Blues Girl". In addition to singing, she played guitar in performance and on many of her recordings.

Later in the 1940s, Booze recorded as a jazz vocalist with the Andy Kirk band, which featured the trumpeter Fats Navarro, and also with a jazz quartet that included the saxophonist George Kelly and the organist Larry Johnson.

She retired from the music industry in the early 1950s, and settled in Baltimore and later in Scottsville, New York, although she recorded with Sammy Price in 1962. She died in Scottsville in 1986.

== Confusion with Muriel Nichols ==
For reasons that remain undocumented, the producer J. Mayo Williams, who knew Booze from his time with Decca, released a version of "See See Rider" sung by Muriel Nichols for his Harlem label as number 1003 in 1945, credited to "Muriel (Bea Booze) Nichols". Nichols, born in Philadelphia in 1908, was a different singer, but this led to the false belief, reported in many sources, that Booze's real name was Muriel Nichols. However, Booze was listed in the 1920 US census as a seven-year-old child, born in Baltimore, Maryland, on March 23, 1912.
