= The Song Spinners =

- Origin: United States
- Genre: Vocal
- Years active: 1942–1944

The Song Spinners were an American singing quartet of two men and two women which began as a folk song group on radio in the 1930s and then enjoyed a burst of popularity during the 1942–44 musicians' strike. They accompanied Dick Haymes on "You'll Never Know" and several other hits. They had a number one hit in 1943 with "Comin' In on a Wing and a Prayer".

They also had a hit with "Johnny Zero" (originally known as "Johnny Got a Zero") that peaked on number seven on the Billboard chart. The song was inspired by John D. Foley (March 1, 1918 – December 21, 1999), who served in the United States Army Air Forces as a gunner during World War II and was popularly known as Johnny Zero. In the song, Johnny does poorly in school, with the other children mocking him with "Johnny got a zero" every time he fails a test. However, when he grows up and becomes a fighter pilot, the words take on an entirely different meaning.

In 1948, The Song Spinners recorded "My Happiness" as an a cappella with Ella Fitzgerald. In addition to frequent radio performances of popular songs, the Song Spinners composed and recorded numerous jingles and remained active in this field through the 1960s.

== Membership ==
Though the membership of The Song Spinners was likely fluid depending on singer availability, the leaders of The Song Spinners were Margaret and Travis Johnson.

== Margaret Johnson ==
Johnson was born on October 24, 1907, in La Grange, Missouri. After graduating from Baylor in 1928, she married fellow singer Travis Johnson and they moved to New York to get into the music business. Margaret did modeling before in 1936, she played 'Honey Chile' on the Bob Hope radio show. The Johnsons started The Song Spinners to perform background vocals on a radio show called "The Wayside Cottage". During the 1942–44 musicians' strike, Decca Records hired Margaret to arrange and perform vocal accompaniment for Bing Crosby, Ella Fitzgerald, the Dick Haymes hit "You'll Never Know" and "Comin' In on a Wing and a Prayer". Margaret returned to radio after the musicians strike, and she appeared in the early days of television. Then she got into recording jingles, with her most famous jingle being, "Winston tastes good like a cigarette should". Margaret and Travis Johnson retired in 1967 and moved to Dallas. After Travis died in 1970, Margaret performed in seniors homes as a volunteer pianist until her death on May 27, 2007.

== Discography ==
- "Comin' In on a Wing and a Prayer" (1943)
- "Johnny Zero" (1943)
- "My Happiness" (Ella Fitzgerald and The Song Spinners) (a cappella) (1948)
