= Don't Stop Now (Bonnie Davis song) =

American song (1943)

"Don't Stop Now" is a 1943 single on the Savoy label by Bonnie Davis. "Don't Stop Now" was Bonnie Davis's only hit, peaking at number one on the Harlem Hit Parade on March 6, 1943, for five non-consecutive weeks.

== See also ==
- List of Billboard number-one R&B singles of the 1940s
