= Transylvania 6-5000 =

Transylvania 6-5000 may refer to:

- Transylvania 6-5000 (1963 film), an animated short film starring Bugs Bunny
- Transylvania 6-5000 (1985 film), a comedy-horror movie

== See also ==
- PEnnsylvania 6-5000
