= Cafe Rouge (Hotel Pennsylvania) =

Restaurant and nightclub in Manhattan

Coordinates: 40.749722°N 73.990556°W

- Interactive map of Cafe Rouge

Restaurant information
- Location: New York City, United States

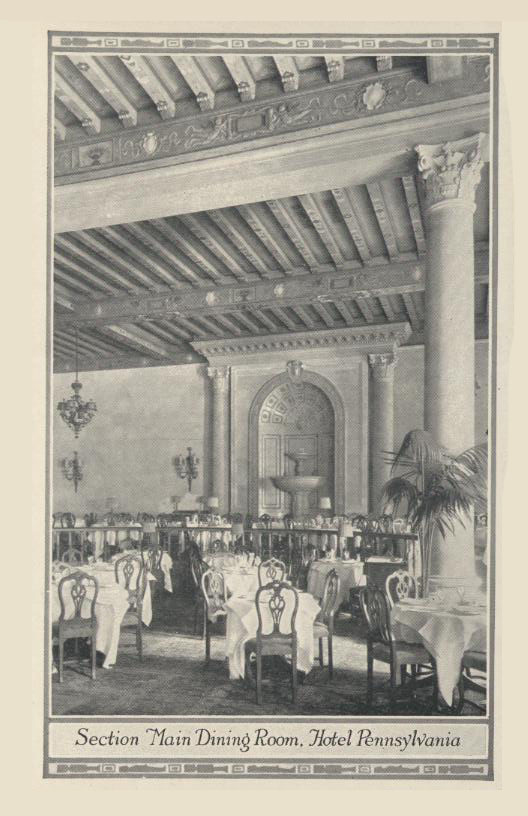
- Interior shot of the Cafe Rouge (East wall)

The Café Rouge was constructed as the main restaurant at Hotel Pennsylvania in Midtown Manhattan, New York City. It achieved its greatest fame as a nightclub.

== Construction ==
The Café Rouge (as well as the rest of the interior and exterior of Hotel Pennsylvania) was designed by the architectural firm McKim, Mead & White. It measured 58 feet by 142 feet (17.7 × 43.3 m), with a ceiling height of 22 feet (6.7 m), making the Café Rouge the largest of its kind anywhere at the time of its creation. Due to the enormous size of the room, the Café was divided into three sections. There was a main central floor level and two terraces on either side of the central space. The terraces were raised 18 inches (46 cm) above the central floor level, whose purpose being to break up the monotony of the large floor space. The terrace sections were available to guests upon request who wanted a view of the entire scene of activities in the main portion of the room, including a full view of the band

The café was designed with a distinct Italian character. The wall base and door trim were made of terracotta, the walls were artificial limestone and the ceiling was treated to give the effect of old wooden beamed ceilings. The ceiling was carefully studied in color to increase the apparent height of the room, and the beams of the ceiling had carvings of various designs. The east end of the café had a large floor to ceiling fountain. The café had large arched windows running along the exterior wall of the room. The arched window design was mimicked on the opposite wall. There was a bandstand which was located on the central floor of the room on the exterior wall.

== Big band era ==
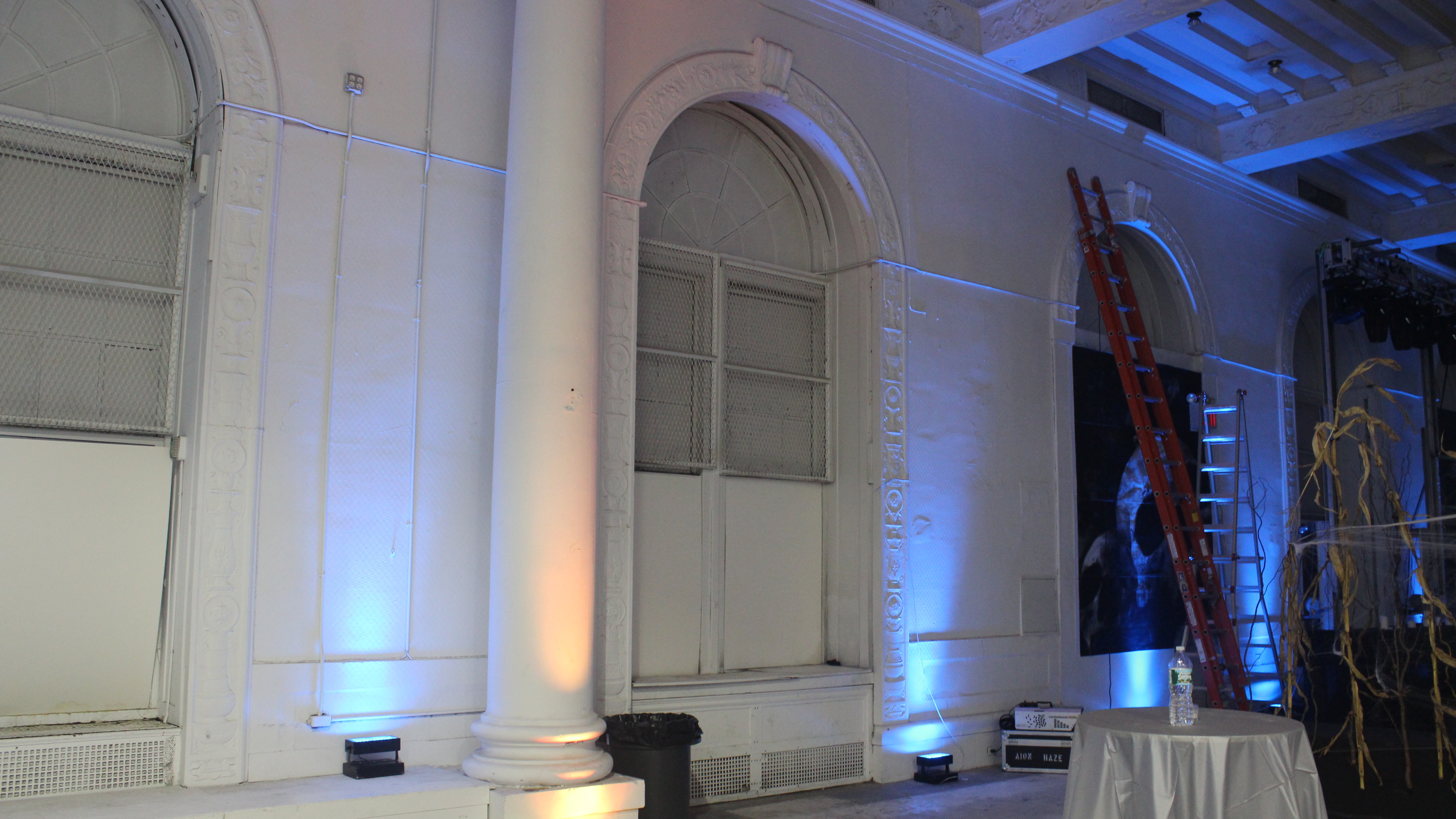
Wall detail as of 2012

In the late 1930s and early 1940s, The Café Rouge had a big band remote connection to the NBC Radio Network and became famous for the performances held inside. Multiple artists played inside the Café, such as The Dorsey Brothers, Woody Herman, Count Basie, Duke Ellington, The Andrews Sisters and Artie Shaw. Glenn Miller and his Glenn Miller Orchestra broadcast multiple live radio performances from the Café; some were recorded by RCA Victor. Glenn Miller returned to Hotel Pennsylvania frequently not just to play in the Café Rouge, but to stay there. The hotel's telephone number appears in the title of one of his best-known songs, Pennsylvania 6-5000. Les Brown's band, with its vocalist Doris Day, introduced their song "Sentimental Journey" at the café in November 1944.

== Final years ==
In the Hotel Pennsylvania's later years, the Café Rouge space no longer operated as a part of the Hotel Pennsylvania business. It was used as a multi-purpose space for numerous events and had a separate address and entrance from the street at 145 West 32nd Street.

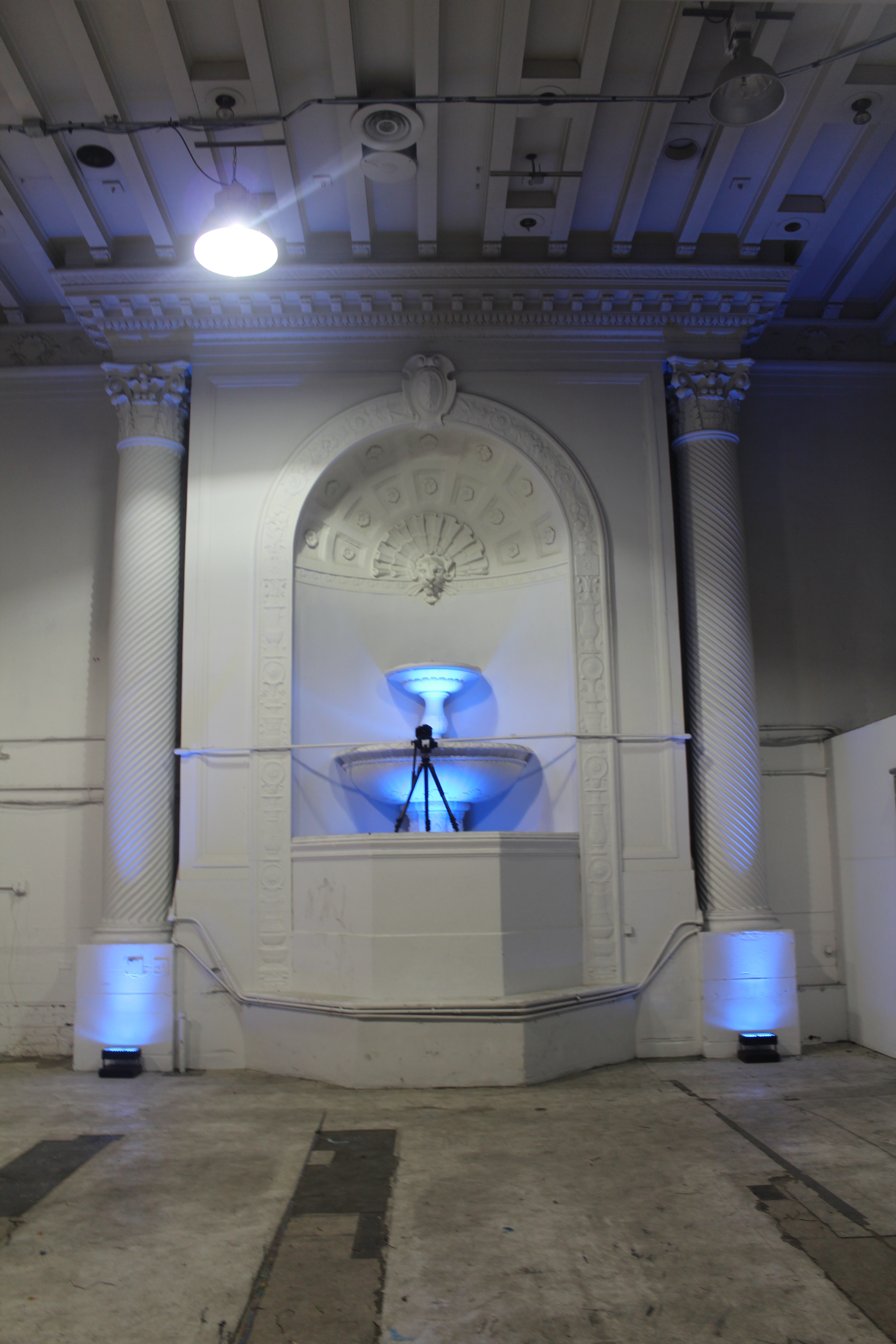
The fountain as of 2012

In 2007, for the Garden in Transit project, adhesive weatherproof paintings of flowers attached to NYC taxicabs were painted inside the Café.

Numerous events from the 2013 New York Fashion Week were held in the Cafe Rouge.

In 2014, the Café Rouge was converted to an indoor basketball court known as Terminal 23, to promote the launch of the Melo M10 by the Jordan Brand division of Nike. Most of the original interior decor remains intact. In the hotel's final years, it operated as a multi-purpose venue, known as Station 32. Though the entire room, as well as the beamed ceiling, had been painted over in white, the original 1919 fountain and other architectural details remained intact until the entire structure closed permanently in 2020.

== Landmark bid ==
The New York City Landmarks Preservation Commission reviewed the Café Rouge for landmarking status on the basis of evaluation papers created by the Hotel Pennsylvania Preservation Society (formerly the Save Hotel Pennsylvania Foundation)

On October 22, 2010, the Café was rejected as a candidate for landmarking, most likely because the 15 Penn Plaza project was approved. The 15 Penn Plaza project, which was first abandoned in 2013, include the demolition of the Café.

The Café (and the hotel) is now demolished as August 2023.

== See also ==
- Hotel Pennsylvania
