= PEnnsylvania 6-5000 =

US telephone number from New York City

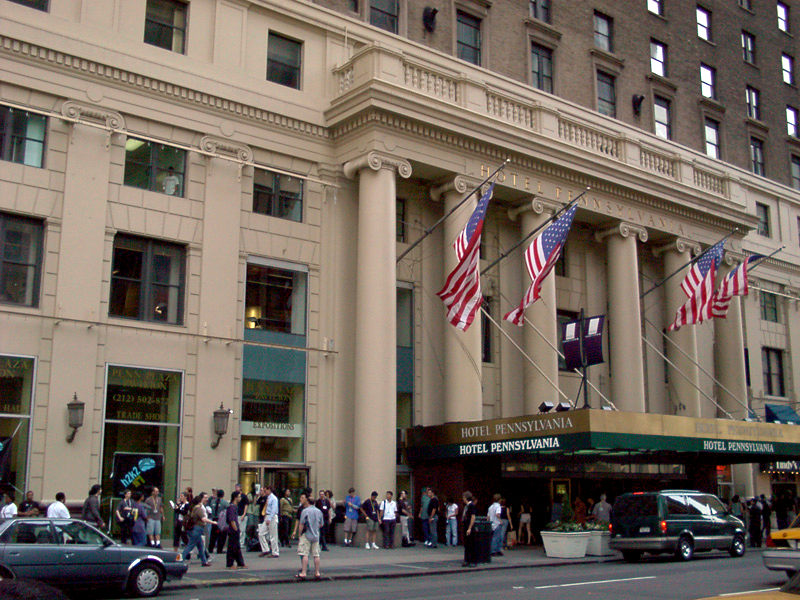
Hotel Pennsylvania in 2011

PEnnsylvania 6-5000 is a telephone number in New York City, written in the 2L-5N (two letters, five numbers) format that was common from about 1930 into the 1960s. The number is best known from the 1940 hit song "Pennsylvania 6-5000", a swing jazz and pop standard recorded by the Glenn Miller Orchestra.

Its longtime owner, the Hotel Pennsylvania, claimed it to be the oldest continuously used telephone number in New York City. The hotel opened on January 25, 1919, but the exact age of the telephone number and the veracity of the hotel's claim are unknown. For many years, callers to (212) 736-5000 were greeted with the hotel's phone system recorded greeting that includes a portion of the song.

The hotel closed permanently in 2020, during the COVID-19 pandemic, and is being torn down to make way for a tower at 15 Penn Plaza. The tower's developer, Steven Roth, said in 2022 that the new building would retain the phone number (212) 736–5000, although he did not specify how the phone number would be reassigned.

The named Pennsylvania exchange served the area around Penn Station in New York. The two letters, PE, stand for the numbers 7 and 3, making the phone number 736-5000, not including the later area code 212 for Manhattan.

== Background ==
At the time of Glenn Miller's popular network radio broadcasts, most local telephone calls in large cities were dialed directly, while intercity calls required the operator. There were no area codes. The length of local numbers varied widely; four or five digits was more than enough for a small city with a single central office, while separate central offices served individual neighborhoods of larger cities.

In large cities, each central office had one or more telephone exchange names. In the 2L-5N system, used only in large cities, a seven-digit local number was dialed as the first two letters of the exchange name (PE for "PEnnsylvania", the exchange serving the area around Penn Station) and five digits.

The telephone numbering plans implemented by telephone companies did not follow any standard practice until the North American Numbering Plan was created by AT&T in 1947. The first automated dial exchanges in the Bell System were deployed in 1919. When seven-digit telephone numbers were first assigned in New York in 1920, the three-letter four-number (3L-4N) system had represented the number in the format PENnsylvania 5000. Similar systems were used in Boston, Chicago, and Philadelphia. By 1930, the 3L-4N system was changed to a 2L-5N system, using two letters and five digits, and PEN-5000 became PE6-5000, much like the BUTterfield central office became BUtterfield 8.

The North American Numbering Plan introduced area codes for the eventually continent-wide implementation of direct distance dialing in 1951 in Englewood, New Jersey. Many calls from outside the city were placed through an operator, by requesting "long distance, New York City, Pennsylvania six, five-thousand". The long-distance operator would either plug into a labeled "New York City, 2L-5N" trunk and dial PE6-5000 or ask the New York City inbound operator to ring the number. The initial area code assignment gave PEnnsylvania 6-5000 Manhattan's area code, as (212) PE6-5000.

In 1969, the PE6 central office was the first in Manhattan to be converted from a panel switch to a 1ESS switch, temporarily making it a significant part of New York Telephone's service crisis. In 1999, area code 646 was overlaid on 212; in 2003, eleven-digit local calling was imposed on all of New York City, including calls within the same area code. Letters from the original named exchange prefixes are occasionally spotted on old signage in the city, but are increasingly rare.

== In popular culture ==
Many big band names played in the Hotel Pennsylvania's Café Rouge, including the Glenn Miller Orchestra.

The number inspired the pun title Transylvania 6-5000, used separately as titles for a 1963 Bugs Bunny cartoon, a 1985 full-length live-action film, and a sketch by Wayne and Shuster. It similarly inspired a 1990 parody song Transylvania 1-2-3-4-5 on Sesame Street, featuring Count von Count.

Another parody was included in the Weird Al Yankovic song, "The Plumbing Song", where the plumber's number is “Roto-Rooter 6-5000”.

Season 1, Episode 4 of the show ALF is titled "Pennsylvania 6-5000".

== See also ==
- Telephone exchange names
