= Pennsylvania 6-5000 (song) =

1940 song by Jerry Gray and Carl Sigman

- 1940 sheet music covers, Robbins Music, New York

Single by Glenn Miller and His Orchestra
- B-side: "Rug Cutter's Swing"
- Released: June 1940
- Recorded: April 28, 1940
- Studio: RCA Studios New York
- Genre: Swing; Traditional pop
- Length: 3:14
- Label: Bluebird B-10754-A
- Composer: Jerry Gray
- Lyricist: Carl Sigman

"Pennsylvania 6-5000" (also written "Pennsylvania Six-Five Thousand") is a 1940 swing jazz and pop standard recorded by Glenn Miller and His Orchestra as a Bluebird 78 rpm single. The music was by Jerry Gray and the lyrics by Carl Sigman.

== Glenn Miller recording ==
Many big band musicians played in Hotel Pennsylvania's Cafe Rouge in New York City, including the Glenn Miller Orchestra.

The hotel's telephone number, PEnnsylvania 6-5000, inspired the Glenn Miller 1940 Top 5 Billboard hit of the same name, which had a 12-week chart run. The instrumental was recorded on April 28, 1940 at the RCA Victor Studios at 155 East 24th Street in New York City. The 78 single was released in June, 1940 as RCA Victor Bluebird 78 B-10754-A backed with "Rug Cutter's Swing". The song was also an advertisement for attendance at the band's live performances, as a call could be put through to Hotel Pennsylvania’s venue the Cafe Rouge for a reservation.

Johnny Best played the improvised trumpet solo on the recording. The Carl Sigman lyrics were not used; instead, a telephone rang at intervals and the band shouted the title afterward.

Two different sheet music covers were released with different photos of Glenn Miller.

== Personnel ==
- Saxophones: Hal McIntyre, Tex Beneke, Wilbur Schwartz, Ernie Caceres, Al Klink
- Trumpets: Johnny Best, R. D. McMickle, Clyde Hurley, Legh Knowles
- Trombones: Glenn Miller, Jimmy Priddy, Paul Tanner, Frank D'Annolfo
- Piano: Chummy MacGregor
- String bass: Herman "Trigger" Alpert
- Guitar: Jack Lathrop
- Drums: Moe Purtill

1940 sheet music, Robbins Music, New York

Alternate cover for the Glenn Miller recording

== Other recordings ==
The song became a jazz and big band standard also recorded by the Andrews Sisters, Judy Garland and Martha Raye in a duet, the Brian Setzer Orchestra, Jimmy Mundy and His Orchestra (1959), Fud Candrix and His Orchestra, Jerry Gray, Mina, Lou Haskins, Jack Livingston, Raquel Rastenni (1941) in Copenhagen, Starlight Orchestra, Klaus Wunderlich, New 101 Strings Orchestra, Heptet, Meco, Tex Beneke, The Modernaires, Jack Million Band, Al Pierson Big Band, BBC Big Band Orchestra, SWR Big Band, and by Captain Cook und seine singenden Saxophone in 2012.

Fats Waller's arrangement of the song for piano was published in the UK songbook Francis & Day's Album of Fats Waller: Musical Rhythms in the 1940s.

== See also ==
- PEnnsylvania 6-5000 – article on the Hotel Pennsylvania's number, which was still in use until the hotel's closure in 2020
- Beechwood 4-5789
- 867-5309/Jenny
