= 15 Penn Plaza =

Proposed skyscraper in Manhattan, New York

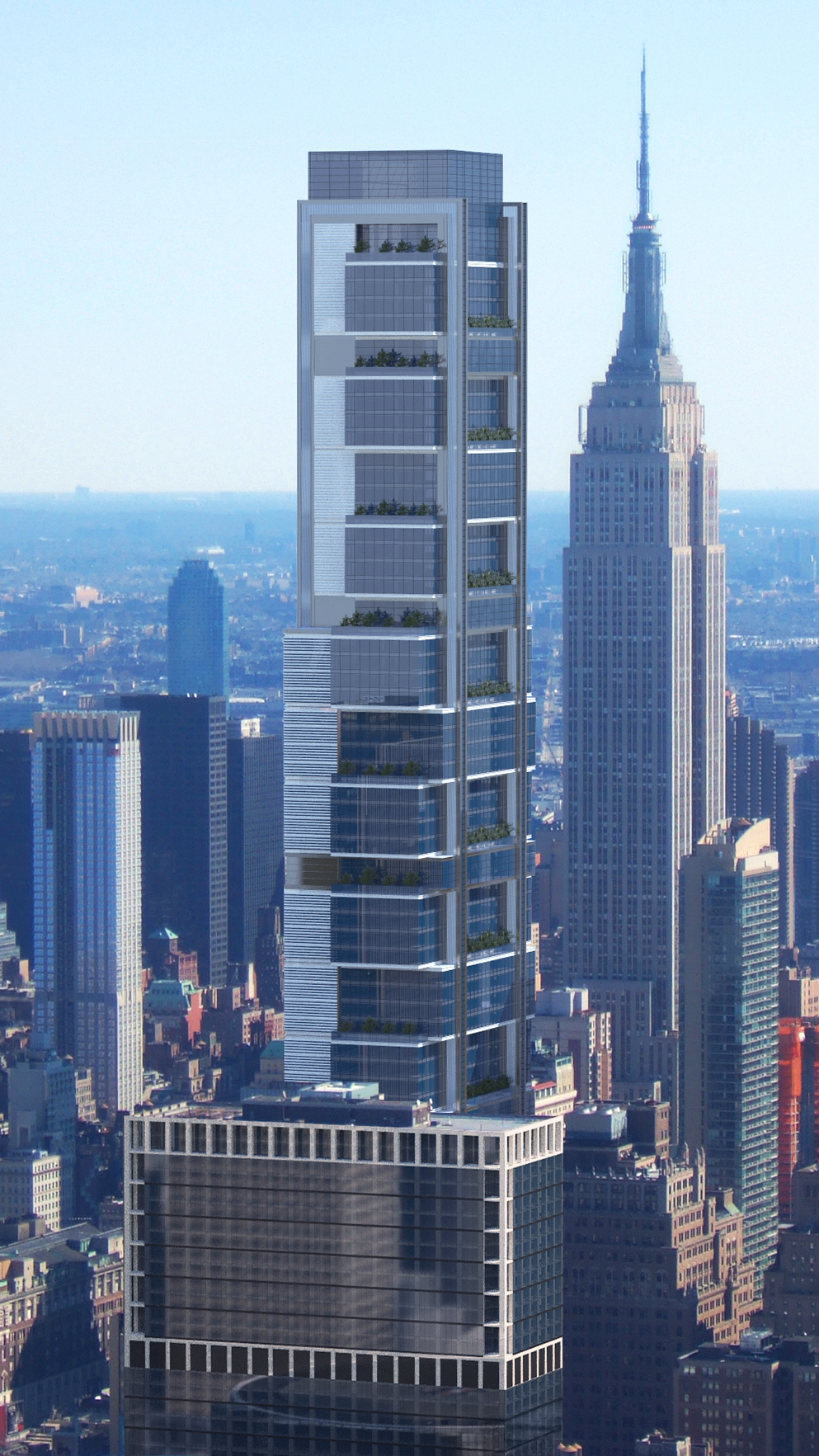
- A rendering of the planned tower
- Interactive map of the 15 Penn Plaza area

General information
- Status: Proposed
- Type: Mixed
- Location: 15 Penn Plaza (401 7th Avenue)
- Coordinates: 40°44′59″N 73°59′26″W
- Construction started: TBD
- Estimated completion: TBD
- Opening: TBD

Height
- Roof: 995 ft (303 m)

Technical details
- Floor count: 48
- Floor area: 2,200,000 sq ft (200,000 m^{2})

Design and construction
- Architects: Foster & Partners
- Developer: Vornado Realty Trust
- Structural engineer: Severud Associates

15 Penn Plaza, also known as PENN15 and Vornado Tower, is a planned supertall office tower to be constructed by Vornado Realty Trust on Seventh Avenue between 32nd and 33rd Streets in the Midtown Manhattan neighborhood of New York City. The building, designed by Foster and Partners, will contain 430 units on 50 floors and 2,200,000 square feet (200,000 m^{2}) of floor space as well as passageways to the adjacent Pennsylvania Station, 34th Street–Herald Square station, and the 33rd Street terminal of the PATH.

The building was originally planned to be 1,270 feet (390 m) tall and have 61 floors, 20 feet (6.1 m) taller than the mooring mast or spire of the Empire State Building, two blocks east, but plans were reduced in November 2025 to 1,000 feet (300 m) tall, as well as its floor count to 50.

The timing of construction will be dependent on market conditions. Vornado is currently exploring using the site for "fashion shows or other temporary uses" until market conditions warrant construction of the building.

== History ==
=== Zoning approval and controversy ===
Anthony and Peter L. Malkin, owners of the Empire State Building, had requested the creation of a 17-block exclusion zone that would prohibit large buildings from being built that would obstruct views of their historic structure and suggested that the proposed skyscraper be limited to 825 feet (251 m) in height. They embarked on what The New York Times described as "a fierce public relations, advertising and lobbying campaign" to derail the project.

In August 2010, the Malkins asked the New York City Council to deny permission for the construction of the tower because it would alter the skyline and obscure the view of the western side of the Empire State Building. The approvals were also contested by historic preservationists worried about the demolition of the Hotel Pennsylvania, which was on the site of the proposed building.

On August 25, 2010, in a 47–1 vote, the City Council voted to approve construction of the building. The council's zoning and land use committees approved the project and the full council overwhelmingly voted to approve the plan, with the only dissenter, Brooklyn Councilmember Charles Barron, voting in the negative as a protest against the absence of a guarantee by Vornado to hire minority and female construction workers. In December 2011, the building project was postponed due to low office market rents.

On March 4, 2013, Vornado announced that it was abandoning plans to build the tower; instead it will "invest aggressively" into the Hotel Pennsylvania to make it into "a really profitable, really good hotel for our purposes."

In August 2014, citing increased interest from tenants, the project was unshelved and the proposed renovation of Hotel Penn was put on hold indefinitely.

Still, as of February 2015, Vornado Chairman & CEO Steven Roth was non-committal to the project: "The Hotel Penn is important, but not the main event. The main event is to get the office buildings so that they command higher market ranch than they do currently. And by the way, they are rising with the marketplace, quite smartly, currently. So we're not prepared to commit to what our plan for the Hotel Pennsylvania is."

Manhattan Community Board 5 voted against the proposed project in December 2017, citing a request for higher energy efficiency and more public and transit improvements. The New York City Department of City Planning approved the plan, which would allow the building to be 56% larger than standard zoning rules provide under special regulations that encourage the development of high-density office space near transit hubs.

Henry Stern, former Commissioner of the New York City Department of Parks and Recreation said the proposed building "could do irreparable harm" to the city. However, Daniel Biederman, president of the 34th Street Partnership joined union and construction officials in saying that "If there's anywhere a building of this size and bulk should be built, it's at Penn Station."

As part of the approval process, Vornado agreed to undertake $100 million in transit-related improvements that would reopen the "Gimbels passageway", which was blocked off in 1986 and would reconnect Penn Station to Herald Square at Sixth Avenue and the 34th Street–Herald Square station (B, D, F, <F>, M, N, Q, R, and W trains) and the 33rd Street terminal of the Port Authority Trans-Hudson (PATH) train, which provides access to Hoboken–33rd Street, Journal Square–33rd Street (via Hoboken) and Journal Square–33rd Street trains. An updated passageway would be built to the standards of "the elegant and efficient passageways at Grand Central and Rockefeller Center" and would also have integrated access to the proposed New Jersey Transit terminal that would be constructed as part of the Access to the Region's Core tunnel that was to be constructed under the Hudson River.

=== Site clearing ===
In April 2021, Vornado again announced plans to demolish the hotel to make way for the new skyscraper, known as Penn15. Demolition of the hotel was underway by January 2022 and was completed by July 2023. After the Hotel Pennsylvania was demolished, Vornado explored using the site for "fashion shows or other temporary uses" until market conditions warrant construction of the building. Vornado briefly considered obtaining a gambling license for a building on the site in 2023, but the plan was dropped amid competition from other developers. In February 2024, Vornado considered a temporary event venue for the site, which might include a 10-story billboard and tennis courts. Vornado again considered developing 15 Penn Plaza in late 2025.

== See also ==
- List of tallest buildings in New York City
