= The Glenn Miller Story (album) =

Compilation album by Glenn Miller Band
- Released: 1954
- Recorded: 1939–1942
- Genre: Jazz
- Label: His Master's Voice

The Glenn Miller Story is a compilation album of tracks recorded by the Glenn Miller Band between 1939 and 1942 which had been released as 78 rpm singles on the Bluebird and Victor labels. It was released in the United Kingdom in 1954 as a ten-inch 33 1/3 rpm monophonic LP on the His Master's Voice label, catalogue number DLP 1024. The front cover of the album shows monochrome photographs of Glenn Miller and James Stewart, both in the uniform of a major in the United States Army Air Forces. The full title (shown only on the front cover of the album) is The One and Only Glenn Miller Band Plays Music from Universal-International's "The Glenn Miller Story", but the film featured different recordings of the same tracks.

== Track listing ==
Side 1
No.	Title	Writer(s)	Recorded	Length
1.	"Moonlight Serenade"	Glenn Miller	April 4, 1939	3:23
2.	"In the Mood"	Joe Garland, Andy Razaf	August 1, 1939	3:40
3.	"I Know Why" (vocal by Paula Kelly and The Modernaires)	Mack Gordon, Harry Warren	May 7, 1941	2:55
4.	"Tuxedo Junction"	Bill Johnson, Julian Dash, Erskine Hawkins	February 5, 1940	4:09
5.	"Pennsylvania Six-Five Thousand"	Carl Sigman, Jerry Gray	April 28, 1940	3:12

Side 2
No.	Title	Writer(s)	Recorded	Length
1.	"Chattanooga Choo Choo" (vocal by Paula Kelly, Tex Beneke and The Modernaires)	Gordon, Warren	May 7, 1941	3:07
2.	"A String of Pearls"	Gray	November 3, 1941	3:12
3.	"At Last" (vocal by Ray Eberle)	Gordon, Warren	May 20, 1942	3:04
4.	"American Patrol"	arrangement by Gray	April 2, 1942	3:17
5.	"Little Brown Jug"	Traditional, arr. Bill Finegan	April 10, 1939	3:06

== See also ==
- Glenn Miller Plays Selections From the Film "The Glenn Miller Story" – United States release with four tracks in common
- The Glenn Miller Story (soundtrack) – recordings by the Universal-International studio orchestra, conducted by Joseph Gershenson
