= The Glenn Miller Story (soundtrack) =

Soundtrack album by Universal-International Orchestra
- Released: 1954
- Recorded: 1953
- Genre: Big band, jazz
- Label: Decca Records

The Glenn Miller Story is a 1954 soundtrack album released on Decca Records with songs from The Glenn Miller Story, the film biography of Glenn Miller, starring James Stewart and June Allyson. The collection had eight songs from the film recorded under the direction of Joseph Gershenson.

An album of Glenn Miller's own recordings of those heard in the film was issued by RCA Victor as LPT-3057.

== Reception ==
The 1954 10-inch album The Glenn Miller Story movie soundtrack LP, Decca Records DL 5519, spent 10 weeks at number one in the US on the Billboard albums chart in 1954. It was recorded by the Universal-International studio orchestra, conducted by Joseph Gershenson. A 1956 version of the collection was a 33 1/3 RPM vinyl LP album with James Stewart and June Allyson on the cover as Glenn and Helen Miller respectively. This collection consisted of new studio recordings of the songs by an orchestra under the direction of Joseph Gershenson.

The album was re-released by Decca in an expanded stereo version in 1956 as DL78226 with two additional songs by Louis Armstrong and the All Stars, "Basin Street Blues" and "Otchi-Tchor-Ni-Ya" or "Dark Eyes".

== Track listing ==
Side 1

1. "Moonlight Serenade" - (Glenn Miller)
2. "Tuxedo Junction" - (Erskine Hawkins, Bill Johnson, Julian Dash)
3. "Little Brown Jug" - (Joseph Winner. Arranged by Billy Finegan)
4. "St. Louis Blues-March" - (W.C. Handy)

Side 2

1. "In The Mood" - (Joe Garland)
2. "A String of Pearls" - (Eddie DeLange, Jerry Gray)
3. "Pennsylvania 6-5000" - (Carl Sigman, Jerry Gray)
4. "American Patrol" - (Frank White Meacham, Arranged by Jerry Gray)

The 1956 expanded stereo re-release had two additional songs by Louis Armstrong and the All Stars:

- "Basin Street Blues" - (Spencer Williams) - Louis Armstrong and the All Stars
- "Otchi-Tchor-Ni-Ya" - (Russian Folk Song, Yevhen Hrebinka, Florian Hermann) - Louis Armstrong and the All Stars

== Personnel ==
The Universal-International Orchestra consisted of:

- Double Bass – Rollie Bundock #
- Clarinet – Willie Schwartz #
- Drums – Ralph Collier
- Guitar – Dick Fisher
- Saxophone – Art Smith, Babe Russin #, Blake Reynolds, Karl Leaf, Lyman Gandee
- Trombone – Joe Yukl, John Stanley, Murray McEachern, Paul Tanner #
- Trumpet – Conrad Gozzo, Gene LaFreniere, Ray Linn, and Zeke Zarchy #
- Conductor was Joseph Gershenson.

"#" indicates a former member of the civilian and/or AAF Glenn Miller bands

The selections were recorded on December 1, 1953.

The All Star Band consisted of:

- Double Bass – Arvell Shaw
- Clarinet – Barney Bigard
- Drums – Kenny John
- Piano – Billy Kyle
- Tenor saxophone – Bud Freeman
- Trombone – Trummie Young
- Trumpet – Louis Armstrong

the former Glenn Miller Orchestra pianist Chummy MacGregor and Miller's manager Don Haynes were advisors on the production.

== See also ==
- Glenn Miller Plays Selections From the Film "The Glenn Miller Story" – United States compilation of original recordings by Glenn Miller and his Orchestra
- The Glenn Miller Story (album) – United Kingdom compilation of original recordings by the Glenn Miller Band

== Sources ==
- Simon, George Thomas (1980). Glenn Miller and His Orchestra. New York: Da Capo paperback. ISBN 0-306-80129-9.
- Simon, George Thomas (1971). Simon Says. New York: Galahad. ISBN 0-88365-001-0.
- Schuller, Gunther (1991). The Swing Era:the Development of Jazz, Volume 2. 1930–1945. New York: Oxford University Press. ISBN 0-19-507140-9.
