= The Glenn Miller Story =

1954 film by Anthony Mann

- Promotional movie poster for the film
- Directed by: Anthony Mann
- Written by: Valentine Davies; Oscar Brodney
- Produced by: Aaron Rosenberg
- Starring: James Stewart; June Allyson; Charles Drake; George Tobias; Henry Morgan; Frances Langford; Louis Armstrong; Gene Krupa; Ben Pollack; The Modernaires
- Cinematography: William H. Daniels
- Edited by: Russell F. Schoengarth
- Music by: Henry Mancini (uncredited)
- Production company: Universal-International
- Distributed by: Universal-International
- Release date: January 19, 1954 (Miami)
- Running time: 116 minutes
- Country: United States
- Language: English
- Box office: $12 million (rentals)

The Glenn Miller Story is a 1954 American biographical film about the American trombonist and bandleader Glenn Miller, directed by Anthony Mann. It stars James Stewart as Miller (in his second non-Western collaboration with Mann), alongside June Allyson. The film was first shown to the public in January 1954 and was nominated for three Academy Awards, winning for Best Sound Recording.

== Plot ==
After he buys back his trombone from a pawn shop, Glenn Miller and his friend Chummy MacGregor perform a gig at the Sunset Hotel, but Miller is thrown out for playing his original jazz arrangements. Pawnshop owner W. Kranz tells Miller that bandleader Ben Pollack is auditioning musicians for his band. Miller sells back his trombone to Kranz and performs his arrangements at the try-outs. Pollack rejects his audition, but changes his mind thanks to MacGregor. Miller returns to the pawn shop once more to buy back his trombone.

Excited, Miller phones his college sweetheart Helen Burger, who has forgotten him having not seen him in two years. Late at night, Miller arrives at Helen's residence and hands her a faux pearl necklace. The next day, they visit their alma mater, the University of Colorado, where Miller tells Helen his desire to create his own unique sound.

For the next two years, Miller performs with Pollack's band and accepts an offer to play in an orchestra for a Broadway musical titled Girl Crazy. In New York, after he hears Helen's favorite song "Little Brown Jug", Miller urgently phones Helen to arrive by train, so they can be married. Despite her previous engagement, Helen arrives in New York and they are quickly married. During their honeymoon, Miller learns from his band mates they have landed another gig at Connie's Inn in Harlem. There, Miller performs alongside Louis Armstrong and Gene Krupa.

Months later, with Helen's encouragement, Miller composes "Moonlight Serenade" but becomes disappointed when it is turned into a nightclub number. Back at home, Miller, MacGregor, and Don Haynes decide to launch their band. They are surprised to learn Helen has secretly saved enough earnings, which they use as the "Glenn Miller Band Fund." However, the tour fails to break even and their truck breaks down in Boston. When Miller learns Helen has suffered a miscarriage, he rushes to the hospital where he expresses disappointment in not creating his unique sound.

The next day, Si Shribman, the owner of the Boston's State Ballroom, visits Helen in the hospital to express regrets for having cancelled her husband's engagement. After Helen shares his husband's struggles, Shribman agrees to finance Miller's new tour. With Shribman's support, Glenn hires a new band. The night before they open, Miller has his trumpet player instead play the clarinet while they play "Moonlight Serenade". From there, he creates the "Miller Sound", which is given a standing ovation.

Miller and his Orchestra becomes popular with several number-one hits, including "A String of Pearls" and "Pennsylvania 6-5000". Miller's success lands him in Hollywood, where he composes a film score. After a recording session, Helen hands her husband a letter from the War Department, which designates Miller as an Army captain.

Miller leads the U.S. Army Band in performing in standard marching songs. Dismayed, he performs his orchestra music and is reprimanded for this change. However, General Henry Arnold approves of Miller's new musical direction and promotes him to bandleader, allowing him to perform his orchestra music. Overseas, Miller finds international success touring his band in support of the Allies during World War II.

On December 15, 1944, Miller boards an airplane from London to Paris. However, the plane fails to arrive. On the day in which Miller's band is to perform a radio broadcast in Paris, Helen is informed of her husband's disappearance. As she listens over the radio to her husband's arrangment of "Little Brown Jug", Helen fondly reflects on her husband's life.

== Historical accuracy ==
There are several anachronisms in the picture. When the military band led by Miller is playing in front of General "Hap" Arnold, a B-29 bomber is in the background. The marching troops are desegregated, which did not occur until 1948. Scenes ostensibly shot in England are clearly staged in the U.S., as witness the presence of RCA Type 44 microphones during a BBC broadcast. In reality, the BBC could not afford them and designed and built its own, cheaper version.

In addition, a few key plot points are either highly fictionalized from actual events or were invented for the film:

- Miller is shown as disliking the tune "Little Brown Jug" and only performing it in 1944 as a "special arrangement" for his wife, who only hears it for the first time the morning after his disappearance and presumed death. The song was actually first performed and recorded in 1939, became one of his most popular early hits, and was performed numerous times by both the civilian and AAF Orchestras. The 1939 recording went on to sell over a million copies.
- Miller was, in fact, dressed down for performing jazz marches and told by a superior officer that Sousa's marches served the military well in World War I. However, in the film, his character apologizes sheepishly and is only rescued by General Arnold whose children are fans. Miller's biographer George T. Simon states that his actual response was "Are you still flying the same planes you flew in the last war?", after which the jazz marches stayed.
- Neither Frances Langford nor the Modernaires performed with Miller's Army Air Force Band.
- Miller never saw his children despite two depictions of such taking place in the film.

== Cast ==
- James Stewart as Glenn Miller (trombone dubbed by Joe Yukl and Murray McEachern)
- June Allyson as Helen Burger Miller
- Harry Morgan as Chummy MacGregor (billed as Henry Morgan)
- Charles Drake as Don Haynes
- George Tobias as Si Shribman
- Barton MacLane as Gen. Henry H. Arnold, USAAF
- Sig Ruman as W Kranz
- Irving Bacon as Mr. Miller
- James Bell as Mr. Burger
- Kathleen Lockhart as Mrs. Miller
- Marion Ross as Polly Haynes
- Nino Tempo as Wilbur Schwartz (clarinet playing dubbed by Wilbur Schwartz)

== Cameo appearances ==
The following artists all appeared as themselves (listed alphabetically):

- Louis Armstrong
- Johnny Best
- Barney Bigard
- Cozy Cole
- Ray Conniff
- Gene Krupa
- Frances Langford
- The Modernaires
- Ben Pollack
- Babe Russin
- Arvell Shaw
- Trummy Young

== Production ==
Universal-International's first public announcements, late in 1952, employed the soon-discarded title, "Moonlight Serenade."

This is the second of three movies that paired Jimmy Stewart and June Allyson, the others being The Stratton Story and Strategic Air Command.

Mann said "The reason I became interested in it was that I wanted to dramatize a sound. And it’s the story of finding a new sound... To tell the story of a man who is hunting something new and finally finds it, and who, during the war years, became one of the great heroes. We tried to make the narrative a little different too. When he proposes to June Allyson, it’s very humorous, because she has curlers in, and so forth. At the end when he’s dead, instead of very sentimental music, we played ‘Little Brown Jug,’ so that it gave it a different feeling from just sentimentality. Of course the film was fraught with sentimentality."

== Premiere ==
The film was first shown to the public in Miami on 19 January 1954, at the Carib, Miami, and Miracle theaters, with Jimmy Stewart in attendance. The film opened in New York City on February 10, 1954. Preceding both of these were the invitation-only press premiere at Hollywood's Pantages Theater on 19 December 1953, a "preview showing" in Miller's Clarinda, Iowa hometown on 13 January 1954, and an exhibition at Universal's Park Avenue offices in New York on 29 January, for 70 invited high school newspaper editors.

=== Reissues ===
The film was re-released in 1960.

An alternate cut of the film, running 3–4 minutes shorter than the original theatrical release was re-released in 1985 with a stereo soundtrack. The film was originally recorded in stereo but was initially released in mono. It was screened out of competition at the 1985 Cannes Film Festival.

=== Home media ===
The film was originally released on home video in the VHS format in 1986. On March 4, 2003, the film was released onto DVD with an anamorphic display, remastered surround sound, and subtitles. The film can also be found in a James Stewart DVD collection that was released in 2007.

The film was released on Blu-ray in Germany on July 24, 2014.

Shout Factory released the film on Blu-ray in the United States on November 20, 2018. This release includes both the original theatrical version, at 1h 56m, and the 1985 alternate cut, running 1h 52m. A detailed comparison of the differences in the two versions can be found at movie-censorship.com.

== Reception ==
The critical reception to The Glenn Miller Story was generally positive. The film holds an 88% rating on Rotten Tomatoes based on 8 reviews.

=== Box-office ===
Upon release in 1954, The Glenn Miller Story was massively successful at the box-office and earned theatrical rentals of over $7 million, placing it third for the year behind White Christmas and The Caine Mutiny. It was Universal's highest-grossing film overseas, with rentals of $5 million, for worldwide rentals of $12 million.

Stewart took a percentage of the profits. In 1955, William Goetz estimated that Stewart had earned $2 million from the film.

=== Awards ===
In 1954, the film was nominated for three Academy Awards, including Best Screenplay (by Valentine Davies and Oscar Brodney) and Best Score (by Henry Mancini and Joseph Gershenson). The film won the Academy Award for Best Sound Recording, by Leslie I. Carey.

== Music ==
Glenn Miller Orchestra pianist John "Chummy" MacGregor was a technical advisor on the movie. Composer Henry Mancini composed the musical score with Joseph Gershenson, who conducted the Universal-International studio orchestra's recreations of Miller's arrangements on the soundtrack. Miller's band was portrayed by The Airmen of Note, an ensemble of the United States Air Force Band originally created in 1950 to carry on the Glenn Miller tradition.

The soundtrack included many big band pieces originally performed by Glenn Miller's orchestra.

1. "Moonlight Serenade"
2. "Tuxedo Junction"
3. "Little Brown Jug"
4. "St. Louis Blues March"
5. "Basin Street Blues"
6. "In the Mood"
7. "A String of Pearls"
8. "Pennsylvania 6-5000"
9. "American Patrol"
10. "Otchi-Tchor-Ni-Ya"

=== Musical cameos ===
The film contains songs by musicians who also make cameo appearances in the film. These cameos include: Louis Armstrong, Barney Bigard, Cozy Cole, Ray Conniff, Gene Krupa, Frances Langford, Skeets McDonald, The Modernaires, Marty Napoleon, Ben Pollack, Babe Russin, Arvell Shaw, and James Young.

=== Billboard charts ===
The original soundtrack to the movie, The Glenn Miller Story---Sound Track, Decca DL 5519 (USA)/BML 8647 (UK), was number one for 10 weeks on the Billboard albums chart in 1954. The 1954 album contained eight selections. The soundtrack was re-released with an expanded track list. The album Glenn Miller Plays Selections From the Film "The Glenn Miller Story" was number one for 11 weeks on the Billboard albums chart the same year, released as RCA Victor LPT 3057. The original 1954 album contained eight selections. An expanded version of the latter album was certified Gold in 1961 by the RIAA.

A tribute album I Remember Glenn Miller, Capitol H 476, by Ray Anthony was number nine on the same Billboard album chart for that week. The extended play versions of the same albums also reached the same position on the Billboard EP charts for that week. The Modernaires released a 45 single on Coral Records, 9–61110, "A Salute to Glenn Miller," which included medleys in two parts from the movie soundtrack, Parts 1 and 2: (I've Got a Gal In) Kalamazoo/Moonlight Cocktail/Elmer's Tune/Moonlight Serenade/Chattanooga Choo Choo/String of Pearls/Serenade in Blue/At Last/Perfidia, that reached number 29 on the Billboard charts in 1954.

== See also ==
- Glenn Miller Orchestra
- Swing music
