= Glenn Miller (album) =

Compilation album by Glenn Miller
- Released: Original 78 album: April, 1944; Original LP album: 1951; Original 45 album: 1949
- Recorded: 1939, 1940, 1941, 1942
- Genres: Dance band, swing
- Label: RCA Victor

Glenn Miller chronology
Smoke Rings (1944)	Glenn Miller (1944)	Glenn Miller Masterpieces, Volume II (1947)

Glenn Miller is a compilation album of phonograph records released by bandleader Glenn Miller and His Orchestra. Released in April, 1944 on RCA Victor as a part of the Victor Musical Smart Set series, described on the front cover as "An Album of Outstanding Arrangements on Victor Records", the set was number one for a total of 16 weeks on the newly created Billboard album charts. The album, also known under the title Glenn Miller and His Orchestra, was certified Gold in July 1968 by the RIAA.

== Track listing ==
These reissued songs were featured on a 4-disc, 78 rpm album set, RCA Victor P-148, containing 20-1564/20-1565/20-1566/20-1567.

Disc 1: (20-1564)

1. "American Patrol", recorded April 2, 1942. Written by Frank White Meacham. Arranged by Jerry Gray.
2. "Song of the Volga Boatmen", recorded January 17, 1941. Traditional Russian folk song. Collected by Mily Balakirev. Arranged by Billy Finegan.

Disc 2: (20-1565)

3. "Tuxedo Junction", recorded February 5, 1940. Written by Erskine Hawkins, Bill Johnson, Julian Dash and Buddy Feyne. Arranged by Jerry Gray.
4. "In the Mood", recorded January 17, 1941. Written and arranged by Joe Garland.

Disc 3: (20-1566)

5. "Little Brown Jug", recorded April 10, 1939. Written by Joseph Winner. Arranged by Billy Finegan.
6. "Moonlight Serenade", recorded April 4, 1939. Written and arranged by Glenn Miller.

Disc 4: (20-1567)

7. "Star Dust", recorded January 29, 1940. Written by Hoagy Carmichael. Arranged by Billy Finegan and Glenn Miller.
8. "Pennsylvania Six-Five Thousand", recorded April 4, 1939. Written by Jerry Gray and Carl Sigman. Arranged by Jerry Gray.

== Personnel ==
The personnel for the April 4, 1939 "Moonlight Serenade" recording session in New York consisted of: Bob Price, Legh Knowles, Dale McMickle, on trumpet; Glenn Miller, Al Mastren, Paul Tanner, on trombone; Wilbur Schwartz, on clarinet and alto saxophone; Hal McIntyre, on alto saxophone; Stanley Aronson, on alto and baritone saxophone; Tex Beneke, Al Klink, on tenor saxophone; Chummy MacGregor, on piano; Allen Reuss, on guitar; Rowland "Rolly" Bundock, on string bass; and Frank Carlson, on drums.

The personnel for "American Patrol": Saxes: Tex Beneke, Wilbur Schwartz, Ernie Caceres, Al Klink, Lloyd "Skip" Martin; Trumpets: John Best, R. D. McMickle, Billy May, Steve Lipkins; Trombones: Glenn Miller, Jimmy Priddy, Paul Tanner, Frank D'Annolfo; Piano: Chummy MacGregor; String Bass: Edward "Doc" Goldberg; Guitar: Bobby Hackett; Drums: Moe Purtill.

The personnel for "Song of the Volga Boatmen": Saxes: Hal McIntyre, Tex Beneke, Wilbur Schwartz, Ernie Caceres, Al Klink; Trumpets: John Best, R. D. McMickle, Billy May, Ray Anthony; Trombones: Glenn Miller, Jimmy Priddy, Paul Tanner, Frank D'Annolfo; Piano: Chummy MacGregor; String Bass: Herman "Trigger" Alpert; Guitar: Jack Lathrop; Drums: Moe Purtill.

The personnel for "Tuxedo Junction": Saxes: Hal McIntyre, Tex Beneke, Wilbur Schwartz, Jimmy Abato, Al Klink; Trumpets: Clyde Hurley, John Best, R. D. McMickle, Legh Knowles; Trombones: Glenn Miller, Tommy Mack, Paul Tanner, Frank D'Annolfo; Piano: Chummy MacGregor; String Bass: Rowland Bundock; Guitar: Richard Fisher; Drums: Moe Purtill.

The personnel for "In the Mood": Saxes: Hal McIntyre, Tex Beneke, Wilbur Schwartz, Harold Tennyson, Al Klink; Trumpets: Clyde Hurley, R. D. McMickle, Legh Knowles; Trombones: Glenn Miller, Paul Tanner, Al Mastren; Piano: Chummy MacGregor; String Bass: Rowland Bundock; Guitar: Richard Fisher; Drums: Moe Purtill.

The personnel for "Little Brown Jug": Saxes: Hal McIntyre, Tex Beneke, Wilbur Schwartz, Stanley Aronson, Al Klink; Trumpets: Bob Price, R. D. McMickle, Legh Knowles; Trombones: Glenn Miller, Paul Tanner, Al Mastren; Piano: Chummy MacGregor; String Bass: Rowland Bundock; Guitar: Allen Reuss; Drums: Moe Purtill.

The personnel for "Stardust": Saxes: Hal McIntyre, Tex Beneke, Wilbur Schwartz, Jimmy Abato, Al Klink; Trumpets: Clyde Hurley, John Best, R. D. McMickle, Legh Knowles; Trombones: Glenn Miller, Howard Gibeling, Paul Tanner, Frank D'Annolfo; Piano: Chummy MacGregor; String Bass: Rowland Bundock; Guitar: Richard Fisher; Drums: Moe Purtill.

The personnel for "Pennsylvania Six-Five Thousand": Saxes: Hal McIntyre, Tex Beneke, Wilbur Schwartz, Ernie Caceres, Al Klink; Trumpets: John Best, R. D. McMickle, Clyde Hurley, Legh Knowles; Trombones: Glenn Miller, Jimmy Priddy, Paul Tanner, Frank D'Annolfo; Piano: Chummy MacGregor; String Bass: Herman "Trigger" Alpert; Guitar: Jack Lathrop; Drums: Moe Purtill.

== Reception ==
Consisting of new pairings of Miller's hit singles on four 10" 78 rpm records, and subtitled An Album of Outstanding Arrangements on Victor Records, Glenn Miller was a highly successful release. As a part of Victor's Musical Smart Set series, the album reached number one on May 12, 1945, and held the slot for 8 weeks in 1945, 5 weeks in 1946, and 3 weeks in 1947 on the nascent Billboard album charts. It saw reissued release on 10" LP and 45 rpm album formats as RCA Victor LPM-31 and P-148, respectively. The album was also released in Canada.

The original release had two pressings, Camden and Indianapolis.

== Additional sources ==
- Simon, George Thomas (1980). Glenn Miller and His Orchestra. New York: Da Capo paperback. ISBN 0-306-80129-9.
- Simon, George Thomas (1971). Simon Says. New York: Galahad. ISBN 0-88365-001-0.
- Schuller, Gunther (1991). The Swing Era:the Development of Jazz, Volume 2. 1930–1945. New York: Oxford University Press. ISBN 0-19-507140-9.
