= Glenn Miller Plays Selections From the Film "The Glenn Miller Story" =

- Reissue cover

Compilation album by Glenn Miller
- Released: 1954
- Recorded: 1939–1942
- Genre: Big band, jazz
- Label: RCA Victor

Glenn Miller chronology
Glenn Miller Masterpieces, Volume II (1947)	Glenn Miller Plays Selections From the Film "The Glenn Miller Story" (1954)	The Glenn Miller Carnegie Hall Concert (1958)

Glenn Miller Plays Selections From the Film "The Glenn Miller Story" is a 1954 compilation album by Glenn Miller and his Orchestra. The collection contained songs featured in the 1954 film The Glenn Miller Story from Universal Pictures starring James Stewart and June Allyson. It was the first Glenn Miller LP to be certified Gold in the U.S.

A true soundtrack album featuring selections actually recorded for use in the film under the direction of Joseph Gershenson, was issued by Decca Records, catalog number DL 5519.

== Reception ==
The 1954 10" album Glenn Miller Plays Selections from the film "The Glenn Miller Story" was number one for eleven weeks on the Billboard albums chart in 1954, released on LP as RCA Victor LPT 3057. This collection featured the original RCA Victor, Bluebird and broadcast recordings by Glenn Miller and his Orchestra.

The album reached no. 10 on the UK album charts in 1961 in an 18-week chart run.

The RIAA certified the album Gold on June 28, 1961.

== Track listing ==
The contents of the album were:

- "Moonlight Serenade" - (Glenn Miller)
- "American Patrol" - (Frank White Meacham, Arranged by Jerry Gray)
- "Pennsylvania 6-5000" - (Carl Sigman, Jerry Gray)
- "In the Mood" - (Joe Garland)
- "Tuxedo Junction" - (Erskine Hawkins, Bill Johnson, Julian Dash)
- "St. Louis Blues" - (W.C. Handy)
- "String of Pearls" - (Eddie DeLange, Jerry Gray)
- "Little Brown Jug" - (Joseph Eastburn Winner. Arranged by Billy Finegan)

Recording dates:

- Track A1: Recorded April 4, 1939
- Track A2: From Broadcast April 23, 1942
- Track A3: Recorded April 28, 1940
- Track A4: Recorded August 1, 1939
- Track B1 & B2: Recorded February 5, 1940
- Track B3: From Broadcast May 5, 1942
- Track B4: From Broadcast June 2, 1940

== See also ==
- The Glenn Miller Story (album) – United Kingdom release with four tracks in common
- The Glenn Miller Story (soundtrack) – recordings by the Universal-International studio orchestra, conducted by Joseph Gershenson

== Sources ==
- Simon, George Thomas (1980). Glenn Miller and His Orchestra. New York: Da Capo paperback. ISBN 0-306-80129-9.
- Simon, George Thomas (1971). Simon Says. New York: Galahad. ISBN 0-88365-001-0.
- Schuller, Gunther (1991). The Swing Era:the Development of Jazz, Volume 2. 1930–1945. New York: Oxford University Press. ISBN 0-19-507140-9.
