= The Modernaires =

American vocal group (active 1934–1970s)

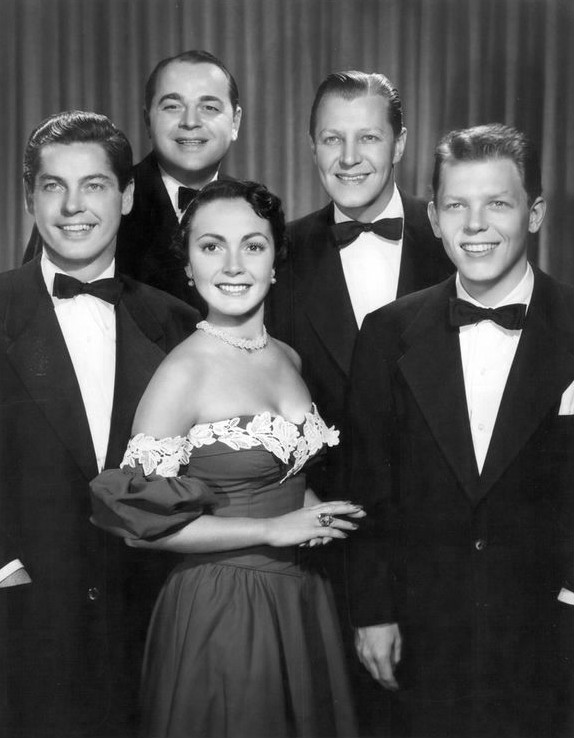
- The Modernaires when they were regulars on the CBS radio program Club Fifteen, 1951.

Background information
- Genres: Swing music, Vocal music
- Years active: 1934–1970s
- Labels: Bluebird Records, Columbia Records, Coral Records, Decca Records, Warner Bros. Records
- Past members: Paula Kelly; Hal Dickinson; Chuck Goldstein; Ralph Brewster; Bill Conway; Fran Scott; Johnny Drake; Alan Copeland; Chuck Kelly; Vernon Polk; Auntie Goodman; Paula Kelly (Junior)
- Website: www.themodernaires.com

The Modernaires were an American vocal group, best known for performing in the 1940s with the Glenn Miller Orchestra.

== Career ==
The Modernaires began in 1934 as "Don Juan, Two and Three," a trio of schoolmates from Lafayette High School in Buffalo, New York. The members were Hal Dickinson, Chuck Goldstein, and Bill Conway. (Jay Warner, in his book American Singing Groups: A History from 1940s to Today, wrote, "They called themselves Three Weary Willies". He added that the trio performed as Don Juan and Two and Three when they "headed for New York in the mid-'30s".

After singing on radio station WGR in Buffalo, New York, for "the enormous sum of $10 a month", the trio went to New York City and gained an engagement of 26 weeks on CBS network radio.

The group's first engagement was at Buffalo's suburban Glen Falls Casino, with the Ted Fio Rito Orchestra. Fio Rito also used them on electrical transcription recordings. They then joined the Ozzie Nelson Band, and became known as "The Three Wizards of Ozzie." They next recruited Ralph Brewster to make a quartet and, performing with the Fred Waring Orchestra, became The Modern-Aires (later changing the spelling). Recordings with Charlie Barnet's orchestra in 1936 did not interest the public but brought them greater industry exposure, and in 1937 they joined the George Hall band, soon moving on to the Paul Whiteman radio show. They recorded many of the classic songs of that era, a few with Jack Teagarden, as part of the Whiteman orchestra in 1938.

In October 1940, Glenn Miller engaged them to record It's Make Believe Ballroom Time, a sequel to the original Make Believe Ballroom, which they had recorded earlier for Martin Block's big band show of the same name, on WNEW New York. In January 1941, Miller made The Modernaires an important part of one of the most popular big bands of all time. Paula Kelly was added to the Miller band between March–August 1941; she and Modernaire Hal Dickinson had married in 1939. The group had ten chart hits in 1941 after appearing with Miller's orchestra in the movie Sun Valley Serenade. The group became a quintet when Kelly became a permanent member of the group after Miller joined the U.S. Army, and for the next few decades they toured internationally with the Glenn Miller Orchestra. Johnny Drake replaced Chuck Goldstein (who left the Modernaires the day after the Miller band broke up in 1942), and Fran Scott replaced Bill Conway (who by fall 1943 was performing with the newly-formed "Double Daters" quartet.)

Songs made popular by Miller and The Modernaires included "Perfidia," "Chattanooga Choo Choo," with Tex Beneke (the first-ever "gold record" with over one million copies sold), "I Know Why," "Elmer's Tune," "Serenade In Blue," "Connecticut," "Jukebox Saturday Night", and "(I've Got a Gal In) Kalamazoo" with Beneke, among others.

In 1945, "There! I've Said It Again" became The Modernaires' first top-twenty hit.

The group was featured in television programming produced by Philco in 1947, using what apparently was an early version of lip synching. An article in 'Variety' magazine's September 10, 1947, issue reported that David Street and The Modernaires guest starred on the Philco program, "simulating singing to off-screen recordings."

After Miller's disappearance, The Modernaires recorded vocal versions of several of Miller's instrumental hits, including "Moonlight Serenade", "Sunrise Serenade", "Little Brown Jug", "Tuxedo Junction", "Pennsylvania 6-5000", and "A String of Pearls". The Modernaires released a 45rpm single on Coral Records, 9-61110, A Salute to Glenn Miller, which included medleys in two parts from the movie soundtrack, A Salute to Glenn Miller, Parts 1 and 2: (I've Got a Gal In) Kalamazoo/Moonlight Cocktail/Elmer's Tune/Moonlight Serenade/Chattanooga Choo Choo/String Of Pearls/Serenade In Blue/At Last/Perfidia, that reached number 29 on the Billboard charts in 1954. In the late 1950s they were featured vocalists with the Bob Crosby Orchestra on his daily TV show. In the 1960s they recorded the theme song for the TV sitcom Hazel. Their style, harmonies and blend influenced later artists such as The Four Freshmen, who in turn were models for the Beach Boys, whom the Beatles later cited as a strong influence on their vocal work.

The Modernaires were inducted into The Vocal Group Hall of Fame in 1999.

== Partial discography ==
10-inch and 12-inch albums:

- Tributes In Tempo (Columbia, 1947)
- Stop, Look And Listen (Coral, 1953)
- Vocally Yours (Festival, 1954)
- Juke Box Saturday Night (Columbia, 1956)
- Modern Aires By The Modernaires (Coral, 1956)
- Here Come The Modernaires (Coral, 1957)
- Harmony Is The Thing (Coral, 1958)
- Like Swung (Mercury, 1960)
- Sing the Great Glen Miller Instrumentals (United Artists, 1961)
- We Remember Tommy Dorsey too! (United Artists, 1961)

=== Compilations ===
Co-billed with Paula Kelly:

- Do You Remember When The Modernaires With Paula Kelly Sang In The Mood (Blue Heaven Records, ca. 1980s)
- String Of Pearls 1946 - 1947 (Circle, 2003)

=== Appearances ===
The Modernaires appeared on various Glenn Miller recordings (RCA Victor) from 1939-1944.

== Deaths of former members ==
- Hal Dickinson (né Harold Hunt Dickinson, Jr.; 1913–1970) died in Santa Barbara, California.
- Chuck Goldstein, born in Buffalo, New York (né Charles J. Goldstein; 1914–1974), died in Englewood, New Jersey.
- Vernon Polk (Vernon Charles Polk; 1926–1981) was found dead by his son in his apartment pool in Rancho Mirage, California.
- Johnny Drake, born in Saint Paul, Minnesota (né John Brayman Drake; 1915–1985), died in Los Angeles, California.
- Ralph Brewster (né Ralph Fletcher Brewster; 1914–1990) died in Tulsa, Oklahoma.
- Bill Conway (né William G. Conway; 1913–1991) died in Los Angeles, California.
- Paula Kelly (1919–1992) died in Costa Mesa, California.
- Fran Scott (né Francis James Schneider; 1915–2002) died in Los Angeles, California.
- Paula Dickinson Kelly, Jr. (1944–2012), who took over singing her mother's parts with the Modernaires from 1966 to 1971, died in Los Angeles, California.
- Alan Copeland (1926–2022), born in Los Angeles and the last surviving Modernaire, died in Sonora, California.
