= Glenn Miller Masterpieces, Volume II =

Compilation album by Glenn Miller
- Released: 1947
- Recorded: 1939–1942
- Genre: Big band, jazz
- Label: RCA Victor

Glenn Miller chronology
| Glenn Miller (1945) | Glenn Miller Masterpieces, Volume II (1947) | Glenn Miller Plays Selections From the Film "The Glenn Miller Story" (1954) |

Glenn Miller Masterpieces, Volume II is an album by bandleader Glenn Miller, released on RCA Victor in 1947, consisting of a collection of four 10" 78 RPM discs, released as RCA Victor P189 as part of the RCA Victor Musical Smart Set series. The album was number one for a total of 6 weeks on the Billboard album charts in 1947. The collection was a follow-up to the 1945 compilation album Glenn Miller.

== Reception ==
The album was number one for a total of 6 weeks on the Billboard album chart established in 1945, reaching number one for one week in 1947 and five weeks in 1948. The album first reached number one on Billboard for the week of November 8, 1947, returned to number one for one week on January 8, 1948, and returned for a four-week run at number one on January 31, 1948. The album consisted of four 10" 78 records. The album was subtitled as "RCA Victor Musical Smart Set: An Album of Outstanding Arrangements on Victor Records". The notation appeared on each disc that the recordings were "Re-issued by Request".

== Track listing ==
All selections by Glenn Miller and his Orchestra.

1. Disc #1, Serial 20-2410:

- A. Chattanooga Choo Choo – (Harry Warren, Mack Gordon) – Vocals by Tex Beneke and The Four Modernaires
- B. Johnson Rag – (Henry Kleinkauf, Guy Hall)

2. Disc #2, Serial 20-2411:

- A. Missouri Waltz – (J. R. Shannon, Frederic Knight Logan)
- B. Pavanne – (Morton Gould)

3. Disc #3, Serial 20-2412:

- A. My Isle of Golden Dreams – (Gus Kahn, Walter Blaufuss)
- B. Perfidia- (Milton Leeds, Alberto Dominguez) – Vocals by Dorothy Claire and The Modernaires

4. Disc #4, Serial 20-2413:

- A. Runnin' Wild – (A. Harrington Gibbs, Joe Grey, Leo Wood)
- B. Bugle Call Rag – (Jack Pettis, Billy Meyers, Elmer Schoebel)

== Personnel ==
The personnel for the May 7, 1941 "Chattanooga Choo Choo" recording session in Hollywood consisted of: Dale McMickle, Johnny Best, Billy May, Ray Anthony, tp; Glenn Miller, Jimmy Priddy, Warren Smith, Paul Tanner, tb; Wilbur Schwartz, cl, as; Hal McIntyre, as; Tex Beneke, Al Klink, ts; Ernie Caceres, bs, as, cl; Chummy MacGregor, p; Bill Conway, g; Edward "Doc" Goldberg, b; Maurice Purtill, d; Ray Eberle, The Modernaires, Paula Kelly, voc.

== Sources ==
- Simon, George Thomas (1980). Glenn Miller and His Orchestra. New York: Da Capo paperback. ISBN 0-306-80129-9.
- Simon, George Thomas (1971). Simon Says. New York: Galahad. ISBN 0-88365-001-0.
- Schuller, Gunther (1991). The Swing Era:the Development of Jazz, Volume 2. 1930–1945. New York: Oxford University Press. ISBN 0-19-507140-9.
