= Wilbur Schwartz =

American clarinetist, alto saxophonist, and flutist

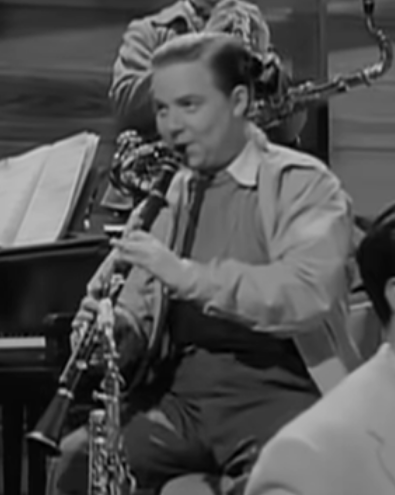
- Schwartz playing in Sun Valley Serenade (1941)
- Born: March 17, 1918; Newark, New Jersey, US
- Died: August 3, 1990 (aged 72); Los Angeles, California, US
- Occupations: Clarinetist, Saxophonist (Alto), Reeds Player
- Known for: Glenn Miller Orchestra
- Spouse: Peggy Clark
- Children: Doug Schwartz, Nan Schwartz, Karen Schwartz
- Parent(s): Charles Schwartz, Pearl Schwartz

Wilbur Schwartz (March 17, 1918, Newark, New Jersey – August 3, 1990 Los Angeles, California), was an American studio session clarinetist, alto saxophonist, and flutist. Who was widely known as a member of the Glenn Miller Orchestra with his tone being critical to the Miller sound. But also worked for people such as Frank Sinatra and Ella Fitzgerald.

== Early years ==
Born in 1918 to Charles and Pearl Schwartz of Newark, New Jersey, young Schwartz studied music as a child, along with his older brother Jack. At the 14th Avenue School, he performed in various ensembles, some under the direction of Henry Melnick.

In the summer of 1934, West Side High Schoolers, Jack and Schwartz, both took a paying gig on the cruise ship, Atlantida, heading to Havana, Cuba.

Jack graduated in January 1935, with Schwartz following suit in January 1936. Club dates and an engagement with Julie Wintz's band kept young Schwartz employed, for a number of years.

Wilbur's religious denomination was Jewish.

== Involvement with the Glenn Miller Orchestra ==
Glenn Miller had just recently went through a departure with many of his orchestras original members, and he was looking for a new sound. George T. Simon, a popular jazz writer for the time, stumbled across Schwartz in March 1938, playing with the Julie Wintz's band at the Top Hat nightclub in Union City, New Jersey. Simon didn't find the band that interesting, but he did find Schwartz's playing style very astounding, and suggested Schwartz to Glenn. To which Glenn wanted to use Schwartz's clarinet sound as the showpiece for his new band. With 20 year old Schwartz playing lead clarinet over four saxophones, Glenn assiduously rehearsed and polished his band's sound: a smooth, "sweet" style of swing with distinctive arrangements by Glenn and Bill Finnegan, among others.

Schwartz later said in a statement talking with George about his recruitment to the Glenn Miller Orchestra:

"Glenn first heard me when the Wintz band was at Roseland —that was after you'd reviewed us at the Top Hat, and I remember I was thrilled to death when a big-name studio musician asked me to join his band."

In the May 1939 issue of Metronome Magazine, Miller talked about Schwartz: “You’ll notice today some bands use the same trick on every introduction; others repeat the same musical phrase as a modulation into a vocal … We’re fortunate in that our style doesn’t limit us to stereotyped intros, modulations, first choruses, endings, or even trick rhythms. And that’s about all there is to it.”

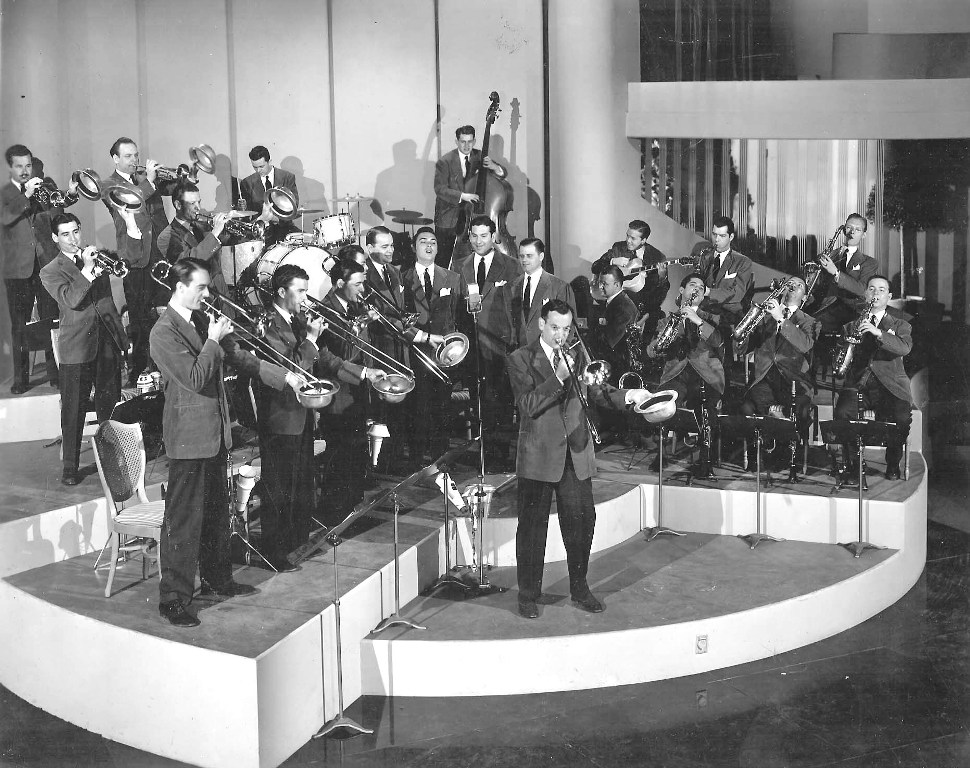
Schwartz playing on the set of Sun Valley Serenade in 1941 with the Glenn Miller Orchestra (Seated on the far right)

According to George, "Willie's tone and way of playing provided a fullness and richness so distinctive that none of the later Miller imitators could ever accurately reproduce the Miller sound."

On March 1 1939 (Miller's birthday), the band received word of being booked for the summer season at the Glen Island Casino, an auspicious showcase. Dates at the Meadowbrook Ballroom followed, with recording sessions for Bluebird and coast-to-coast radio broadcasts sponsored by Chesterfield. Wilbur played clarinet and saxophone in many of these recordings.These recordings are held in many archives as they were recorded to acetate discs.

The Glenn Miller band was accorded the first gold record ever by the RIAA for "Chattanooga Choo-Choo" and hits that defined the era followed: "In The Mood", "Pennsylvania 6-5000" (printed as "Pennsylvania Six-Five Thousand" on record labels), "A String Of Pearls", "(I've Got A Gal In) Kalamazoo", "American Patrol", "Tuxedo Junction", "Elmer's Tune", "Little Brown Jug", and the band's theme and the swing era's archetypical ballad, "Moonlight Serenade" on which Schwartz's golden clarinet tone was imprinted on a generation.

== Second World War ==
Upon the United States' entry into the Second World War, Miller's patriotism spurred him to disband his civilian band at the peak of its success and enlist in the Army Air Force. Despite repeated entreaties from Miller, Schwartz initially struck out on his own as a sideman, but sensing the inevitable, eventually enlisted in the Merchant Marines.

Stationed on Catalina Island, he met lifelong friend Ted Nash, another woodwind player, who would later join the Les Brown band.

Following the war, Hollywood studio work blossomed and Schwartz was playing a five day-a-week radio show for Bob Crosby when he met Peggy Clark, one of the vocalist for the Sentimentalists with Tommy Dorsey. Six weeks later, they married on September 17, 1948.

== Post-war career ==
The studio work continued, as Schwartz was in demand as a perfect sight-reader and doubler on saxophone, clarinet, and flute (having studied with Roger Stevens). Sessions with his friend from the Miller days, Billy May, led to work with young Nelson Riddle, Gordon Jenkins, and others. Album work with Frank Sinatra, Ella Fitzgerald, Nat King Cole, Judy Garland, and many others was supplemented by film work for up-and-comers like Henry Mancini and Neal Hefti.

Playing for the Kennedy inauguration was a highlight, as was playing for Johnny Mandel on the film score of "The Sandpiper". Johnny Mann hired him in the band for The Joey Bishop Show (up against The Tonight Show With Johnny Carson, for which he occasionally played under Doc Severinson, or The Merv Griffin Show with leader Mort Lindsey).

Schwartz's sound was in demand well into the 1980s, when composer John Williams tapped him to play for the score of "Indiana Jones and the Temple of Doom", James Horner for "Cocoon" and "Batteries Not Included".

== Family life ==
Schwartz married Peggy Clark, whose career rivaled his. She was singing on The Jack Smith Show for radio when they met, and she became a prodigious session singer, recording for Henry Mancini, Jud Conlon, Jimmy Joyce, Earl Brown, and many others.

Schwartz had two daughters, one of them being, Nan Schwartz, who is a session singer for film, records, commercials, television, Grammy-winning composer, and seven-time Emmy nominee.

Karen Schwartz is his second daughter, following in the footsteps of her mother, who sang on records and film scores. She also has work in many television shows and movies, along with some work with famous bands like The Carpenters.

His son, Doug Schwartz, is a music engineer. Who is also a Grammy-award winner for his work in music mastering. Doug was hired by MCA Records for the task of remastering their older recordings. With Doug also working on Billie Holiday and Chuck Berry box sets.
