= Joe Yukl =

American jazz musician

- Born: March 5, 1909; Los Angeles, California, U.S.
- Died: March 16, 1981 (aged 72); Los Angeles, California, U.S.
- Genres: Jazz
- Instruments: Trombone

Joseph William Yukl (March 5, 1909 – March 16, 1981) was an American jazz trombonist.

== Early life ==
Yukl learned to play violin before switching to trombone as a teenager.

== Career ==
Yukl relocated to New York City in 1927, where he took a position playing in radio bands for CBS, and worked with Red Nichols and The Dorsey Brothers. He played with Joe Haymes in 1934, then with the Dorseys once again; through the end of the decade he also played with Louis Armstrong, Ray McKinley, Bing Crosby, Ben Pollack, Frankie Trumbauer, and Ted Fio Rito. In the 1940s he worked as a session musician for studio recordings in Los Angeles and for film and television; he played with Wingy Manone and Charlie LaVere in the 1940s. He appears in the film Rhythm Inn (1951) and is heard playing trombone in The Glenn Miller Story (1953).
