= At Last =

1941 song

- 1942 sheet music cover

Single by Glenn Miller and His Orchestra
- A-side: "(I've Got a Gal in) Kalamazoo"
- Released: 1942
- Genre: Pop, jazz
- Label: RCA
- Songwriters: Mack Gordon; Harry Warren

"At Last" is a song written by Mack Gordon and Harry Warren for the 1942 musical film Orchestra Wives. Glenn Miller and his orchestra recorded the tune several times, and a 1942 version reached number two on the US Billboard pop chart.

In 1960, rhythm and blues singer Etta James recorded an arrangement by Riley Hampton that expanded on Warren's original melody. Her rendition served as the title track of her debut album At Last! and was inducted into the Grammy Hall of Fame in 1999. The song has since been recorded by many artists, with later chart successes by Celine Dion and Beyoncé.

== Glenn Miller original renditions ==
Before the release of Sun Valley Serenade, "At Last" was performed in the film by Glenn Miller and his orchestra, with vocals by John Payne and Lynn Bari, dubbed by Pat Friday. Studio head Darryl Zanuck reportedly objected that the film contained "too many big ones" and decided to hold the song for a later production. As a result, the Payne–Bari vocal was removed from the final cut, although instrumental versions remained, including in the Black Ice Ballet finale. The vocal arrangement was later used in Orchestra Wives (1942), again with Miller's orchestra, sung by Ray Eberle and Bari, with Friday dubbing Bari's part.

Unreleased recordings of the song were made by Miller in 1941. A new studio version was recorded in Hollywood on May 20, 1942, and issued by RCA Victor as a 78 rpm single, backed with the A-side "(I've Got a Gal in) Kalamazoo". The song entered the US Billboard pop chart (then titled "Songs with the Most Radio Plugs") on August 1, 1942, at number 17, and peaked at number two on August 29, 1942. It remained on the chart for 17 weeks and later became a standard.

The personnel on the 1942 studio recording were: Ray Eberle (vocals); Billy May, John Best, Steve Lipkins, R.D. McMickle (trumpet); Glenn Miller, Jim Priddy, Paul Tanner, Frank D'Annolfo (trombone); Lloyd "Skip" Martin, Wilbur Schwartz (clarinet, alto saxophone); Tex Beneke, Al Klink (tenor saxophone); Ernie Caceres (baritone saxophone); Chummy MacGregor (piano); Bobby Hackett (guitar); Edward "Doc" Goldberg (string bass); and Maurice Purtill (drums). The arrangement was by Jerry Gray and Bill Finegan.

When RCA Victor issued two 10-inch LP soundtracks to Sun Valley Serenade and Orchestra Wives in 1954, to coincide with the theatrical reissue of both films, the outtake version of "At Last" from Sun Valley Serenade was included for the first time. The Orchestra Wives version did not appear until 1958, when it was released on the 20th-Century Fox double-disc set Glenn Miller: Compilation of His Original Film Soundtracks (TCF-100-2).

=== Wartime release ===
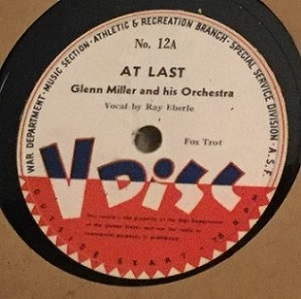
V-Disc 12A, October 1943

The 1942 RCA Victor studio recording of "At Last" by Glenn Miller and his orchestra, with Ray Eberle on vocals, was issued as a U.S. Army V-Disc (Victory Disc) in October 1943 as No. 12A. V-Discs were distributed to American soldiers and other military personnel stationed overseas.

== Later versions ==
"At Last" has been recorded by many artists since its original 1940s renditions. Former Glenn Miller Orchestra trumpeter Ray Anthony achieved the highest‑charting US version in 1952, reaching number two on the Billboard pop singles chart and number 20 on the Cashbox chart. A 1991 recording by Gene Watson peaked at number 61 on the Billboard Hot Country Singles & Tracks chart.

In 2012, Christina Aguilera was invited by Etta James' family to perform "At Last" at James' funeral. Aguilera described James as her idol and inspiration, stating that she performs "At Last" at every concert in her honor. She also recorded a studio version of the song, registered with American Society of Composers, Authors and Publishers (ASCAP), although the cover remains unreleased.

=== Etta James version ===
"At Last"
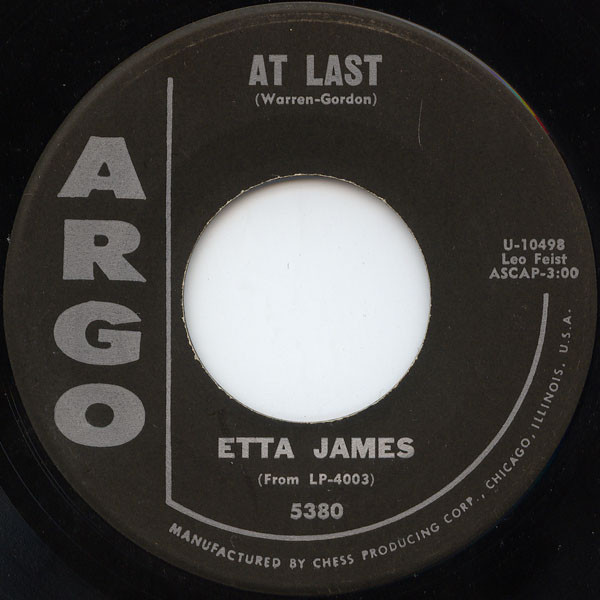
- American single label

Single by Etta James

from the album At Last!
- B-side: "I Just Want to Make Love to You"
- Released: November 15, 1960
- Recorded: 1960
- Genre: Rhythm and blues
- Length: 3:00
- Label: Argo
- Songwriters: Mack Gordon; Harry Warren
- Producers: Phil Chess; Leonard Chess

Etta James singles chronology
"My Dearest Darling" (1960)	"At Last" (1960)	"Trust in Me" (1961)

Audio
- "At Last" on YouTube

"At Last" became R&B singer Etta James's signature song and was the third in a series of successful singles from her Argo Records debut album At Last!. In April 1961, it became her second number two R&B hit and crossed over to pop radio, reaching number 47 on the Billboard Hot 100. Although its pop chart position was modest, the recording became widely known, remains a staple of oldies radio, and is regarded as a musical standard. It also reached number 30 in Cashbox magazine.

James's version, noted for its vocal delivery and orchestral arrangement, is frequently used at weddings and wedding receptions.

After one of James's other singles, "Something's Got a Hold on Me", was sampled in two major 2011 releases (Avicii's "Levels" and Flo Rida's "Good Feeling"), "At Last" entered the UK Singles Chart for the first time, reaching number 69. Following James's death in 2012, the song re-entered the charts and rose into the top 40.

In 2009, James's recording was added to the Library of Congress' National Recording Registry.

In 2021, it was ranked at number 115 on the Rolling Stone's Top 500 Greatest Songs of All Time.

==== Charts ====
2011 weekly chart performance
Chart (1961)	Peak position
US Billboard Hot 100	47
US Cash Box Top 100	30
US Billboard Hot R&B Sides	2

2011–2012 weekly chart performance
Chart (2011–2012)	Peak position
Australia (ARIA)	72
Ireland (IRMA)	33
UK Singles (Official Charts)	39

==== Certifications ====
Certifications
Region	Certification	Certified units/sales
Denmark (IFPI Danmark)	Gold	45,000^{‡}
Italy (FIMI)	Platinum	100,000^{‡}
Spain (Promusicae)	Platinum	60,000^{‡}
United Kingdom (BPI)	2× Platinum	1,200,000^{‡}
United States (RIAA)	Gold	500,000^{*}
^{*} Sales figures based on certification alone.^{‡} Sales+streaming figures based on certification alone.

=== Celine Dion version ===
"At Last"

Promotional single by Celine Dion

from the album A New Day Has Come
- Released: November 2002
- Studio: Piccolo (Montreal); Banana Boat (Burbank)
- Genre: Pop
- Length: 4:16
- Label: Epic
- Songwriters: Mack Gordon; Harry Warren
- Producers: Humberto Gatica; Guy Roche

Audio
- "At Last" on YouTube

"At Last" was recorded by Canadian singer Celine Dion for her eighteenth studio album, A New Day Has Come (2002). Produced by Humberto Gatica and Guy Roche, the track was released as a promotional single in the United States in November 2002. No music video was created, and the release served as the album's final single.

In January 2003, the song reached number 16 on Billboard's Adult Contemporary chart and number 13 on the Radio & Records Adult Contemporary chart. A live version was later included on the A New Day... Live in Las Vegas album (2004), as Dion performed the song throughout her A New Day... residency on the Las Vegas.

==== Critical reception ====
Critical responses to Dion's interpretation were generally positive. Frédéric Garat of RFI described it as "a lovely exercise which reveals the layer of blues hiding underneath the slightly prim and proper petticoats of the 'international star'". An editorial review from Barnes & Noble stated that "her solid rendition of Etta James's 'At Last' should satisfy her lovelorn fans". Sal Cinquemani of Slant Magazine called it "a soulful rendition". Chuck Taylor of Billboard wrote that the standard suited Dion's adult‑contemporary audience. In contrast, Rob Sheffield of Rolling Stone argued that "she doesn't have the pipes for material defined by Etta James".

==== Weekly charts ====
Weekly chart performance
Chart (2002–2003)	Peak position
US Adult Contemporary (Billboard)	16
US Adult Contemporary (Radio & Records)	13

==== Year-end charts ====
Year-end chart performance
Chart (2003)	Position
US Adult Contemporary (Radio & Records)	49

=== Beyoncé version ===
"At Last"

Single by Beyoncé

from the album Cadillac Records: Music from the Motion Picture
- Released: November 3, 2008
- Genre: Soul blues
- Length: 2:58
- Label: Columbia
- Songwriters: Mack Gordon; Harry Warren

Beyoncé singles chronology
"If I Were a Boy" / "Single Ladies (Put a Ring on It)" (2008)	"At Last" (2008)	"Diva" / "Halo" (2009)

Audio
- "At Last" on YouTube

"At Last" was also recorded by Beyoncé for the soundtrack album of the film Cadillac Records (2008). The song was released on December 2, 2008, through Columbia Records. In the film, Beyoncé portrays Etta James, earning critical praise for her performance in Cadillac Records. She has performed "At Last" on numerous occasions since the film's release, including in front of James herself.

Speaking to MTV News, Beyoncé said: "[Etta James is] one of my heroes, and I always loved her voice, but now knowing what she's been through, she's one of my heroes. I'm not sure if she thought [I would be good] as her. I'm very, very nervous ... I actually spoke with her and she told me, 'I loved you from the first time you sung.'"

She later told Billboard: "I realized that Etta James was so unapologetic, bold and strong that playing her was a big risk for me. It gave me the confidence and the push to challenge myself a little more with my music."

==== Critical reception ====
Beyoncé's interpretation of "At Last" in Cadillac Records received generally positive reviews. Critics from The Christian Science Monitor, The New York Times and Entertainment Weekly praised the emotional clarity of her performance and felt that she conveyed the song convincingly within the film's context.

Other reviewers were more reserved. Writers for Allmusic and About.com argued that Beyoncé's rendition lacked some of Etta James's vocal grit and stylistic nuance, describing her approach as more polished and less raw than the original. A reviewer for Entertainment Weekly similarly noted that Beyoncé's delivery, while technically strong, did not fully replicate the emotional weight associated with James's original recordings.

Beyoncé's version of "At Last" won the Grammy Award for Best Traditional R&B Vocal Performance at the 52nd Annual Grammy Awards. On The Village Voice's 2008 year-end Pazz & Jop singles list, the recording was ranked at number 443.

==== Live performances ====
Beyoncé performed "At Last" live for the first time during the 2008 Fashion Rocks event on September 5, 2008, as a tribute to Etta James. A live version from the show was later released in 2008. She performed the song again at the Neighbourhood Ball during Barack Obama's first dance with Michelle on the night of the inauguration. Beyoncé described the moment as an honor and expressed her excitement at being part of the historic occasion. The Washington Post noted that her emotional delivery resonated with the symbolic significance of the event.

Etta James reacted negatively to Beyoncé's inauguration performance, expressing frustration that she had not been invited to sing her signature song. Her remarks, made during concerts shortly after the event, drew media attention. She later clarified to the Daily News that her comments were not meant to be taken literally and that she was primarily disappointed about not being asked to perform.

"At Last" was later included in the set list of Beyoncé's I Am... World Tour (2009–2010). Performed in the penultimate section of the show, the song was accompanied by a montage of footage from Obama's inauguration, civil rights imagery, and scenes from Cadillac Records. Critics praised the staging and emotional impact of the performance, noting its blend of historical imagery and vocal delivery. Beyoncé also performed "At Last" at her Glastonbury Festival headline show on June 26, 2011. She later performed the song during the ITV special A Night With Beyoncé (2011) and at The Sound of Change Live charity concert in 2013.

==== Charts ====
Weekly charts

Weekly chart performance
Chart (2008)	Peak position
Canadian Hot 100	79
UK R&B Chart	37
US Billboard Hot 100	67
US Billboard Hot R&B/Hip-Hop Songs	79
US Billboard Jazz Songs	9

Year-end charts

Year-end chart performance
Chart (2009)	Position
US Billboard Smooth Jazz Songs	33

===== Release history =====
Release history
Country	Date	Format	Label
United States	November 3, 2008	Smooth jazz radio	Columbia
United States	November 18, 2008	Digital download	Columbia
United States	October 27, 2009	Urban contemporary radio	Columbia
