= Murray McEachern =

Canadian jazz trombonist and saxophonist (1915–1982)

- Born: Murray McEachern; August 16, 1915; Toronto, Ontario, Canada
- Died: April 28, 1982 (aged 66)
- Genres: jazz
- Instruments: trombone, alto saxophone
- Formerly of: Benny Goodman, Casa Loma Orchestra Harry James Orchestra

Murray McEachern (August 16, 1915 – April 28, 1982) was a Canadian jazz trombonist and alto saxophonist, perhaps best known for having played trombone for Benny Goodman from 1936 to 1937. McEachern is also remembered for playing both the trombone and alto saxophone for the Casa Loma Orchestra from 1937 to 1941.

== Biography ==
McEachern was born in Toronto, Ontario, Canada. He studied the violin at the Toronto Conservatory of Music as a boy, and played his first concert recital at Massey Hall at age 12. As a teenager Murray studied both the saxophone and clarinet, playing with Lucio Agostini and also appearing on CRBC with Percy Faith. Over time McEachern became proficient on several instruments, including the trombone, bass and trumpet.

In 1936, he went to Chicago in search of work, and got a break as soloist on trombone for Benny Goodman's big band. He also worked with the Jack Hylton orchestra and then with the Casa Loma Orchestra (led by Glen Gray) from 1937 to 1941. In 1941, McEachern joined the Paul Whiteman orchestra and shortly after began entertaining U.S. troops during World War II. In 1947, he worked with the Phil Moore orchestra.

McEachern did studio work in his later career for Hollywood films, including solo performances in The Glenn Miller Story, Paris Blues and The Benny Goodman Story.

A successful recording artist as leader, McEachern also toured Europe in 1972 and briefly worked with the Duke Ellington orchestra in 1973 and was owner/director of the Tommy Dorsey orchestra from 1974 to 1977. In the 1960s he was also in the Morey Amsterdam Orchestra for the Morey Amsterdam Show on television station KTLA in Los Angeles.

== Select discography ==
- "Murray McEachern... and friends" (Klavier)
- "Music for Sleepwalkers Only" (Key)
- "Caress" (Cap)
- "Warm Trombone" (Dot)

with Anita O'Day and Billy May:

- Anita O'Day and Billy May Swing Rodgers and Hart (Verve)

with Benny Goodman:

- "Benny Goodman Performance Recordings" (MGM)

with Phil Moore:

- "Phil Moore - Concerto For Piano And Orchestra - Concerto For Trombone And Orchestra" (Discovery)
