= Chattanooga Choo Choo =

1941 song by Mack Gordon

- 1941 record

Single by Glenn Miller and His Orchestra with Tex Beneke and The Four Modernaires
- A-side: "I Know Why (And So Do You)"
- Published: August 20, 1941
- Released: July 25, 1941
- Recorded: May 7, 1941
- Genre: Big band, swing
- Length: 3:27
- Label: Bluebird
- Composer: Harry Warren
- Lyricist: Mack Gordon

"Chattanooga Choo Choo" (1944 Swing Shift recording)
A recording by the Glenn Miller AAF Orchestra (with Ray McKinley and The Crew Chiefs on vocals) for the Swing Shift radio broadcast

"Chattanooga Choo Choo" Is a song that was written by Mack Gordon and composed by Harry Warren in 1941 originally recorded as a big band/swing tune by Glenn Miller and His Orchestra and was featured in the 1941 movie Sun Valley Serenade. and the first song to receive a gold record, presented by RCA Victor in 1942, which sold about 1.2 million copies.

== Background ==
The song was an extended production number in the 20th Century Fox 1941 film Sun Valley Serenade. The Glenn Miller recording, catalogued RCA Bluebird B-11230-B, became the No. 1 song across the United States on December 7, 1941, and remained at No. 1 for nine weeks on the Billboard Best Sellers chart. The B-side of the single was "I Know Why (And So Do You)", which at first was the A-side.

The song opens up with the band, sounding like a train rolling out of the station, complete with the trumpets and trombones imitating a train whistle, before the instrumental portion comes in playing two parts of the main melody. This is followed by the vocal introduction of four lines before the main part of the song is heard.

The main song opens with a dialog between a passenger and a shoeshine boy:

"Pardon me, boy, is that the Chattanooga Choo Choo?"
"Yes, yes, Track 29!"
"Boy, you can give me a shine."
"Can you afford to board the Chattanooga Choo Choo?"
"I've got my fare, and just a trifle to spare."

The singer describes the train route, originating from Pennsylvania Station in New York and running through Baltimore to North Carolina before reaching Terminal Station in Chattanooga, Tennessee. He mentions a woman he knew from an earlier time in his life, who will be waiting for him at the station and with whom he plans to settle down for good. After the entire song is sung, the band plays two parts of the main melody as an instrumental, with the instruments imitating the "WHOO WHOO" of the train as the song ends.

The lyrics reference other popular songs of the 1920s and 1940s, such as "Nothing could be finer than to have your ham and eggs in Carolina", "When you hear the whistle blowin'", "Beat Me Daddy, Eight to the Bar", and "Satin and lace, I used to call 'funny face'".

The 78-rpm was recorded on May 7, 1941, for RCA Victor's Bluebird Records and became the first to be certified a gold disc on February 10, 1942, for 1,200,000 sales. The transcription of this award ceremony can be heard on the first of three volumes of RCA's "Legendary Performer" compilations released by RCA in the 1970s. In the early 1990s a two-channel recording of a portion of the Sun Valley Serenade soundtrack was discovered, allowing reconstruction of a true-stereo version of the film performance.

The composition was nominated for an Academy Award in 1941 for Best Song from a movie. The song achieved its success that year even though it could not be heard on network radio for much of 1941 due to the ASCAP boycott.

In 1996, the 1941 recording of "Chattanooga Choo Choo" by Glenn Miller and His Orchestra was inducted into the Grammy Hall of Fame.

== Inspiration ==
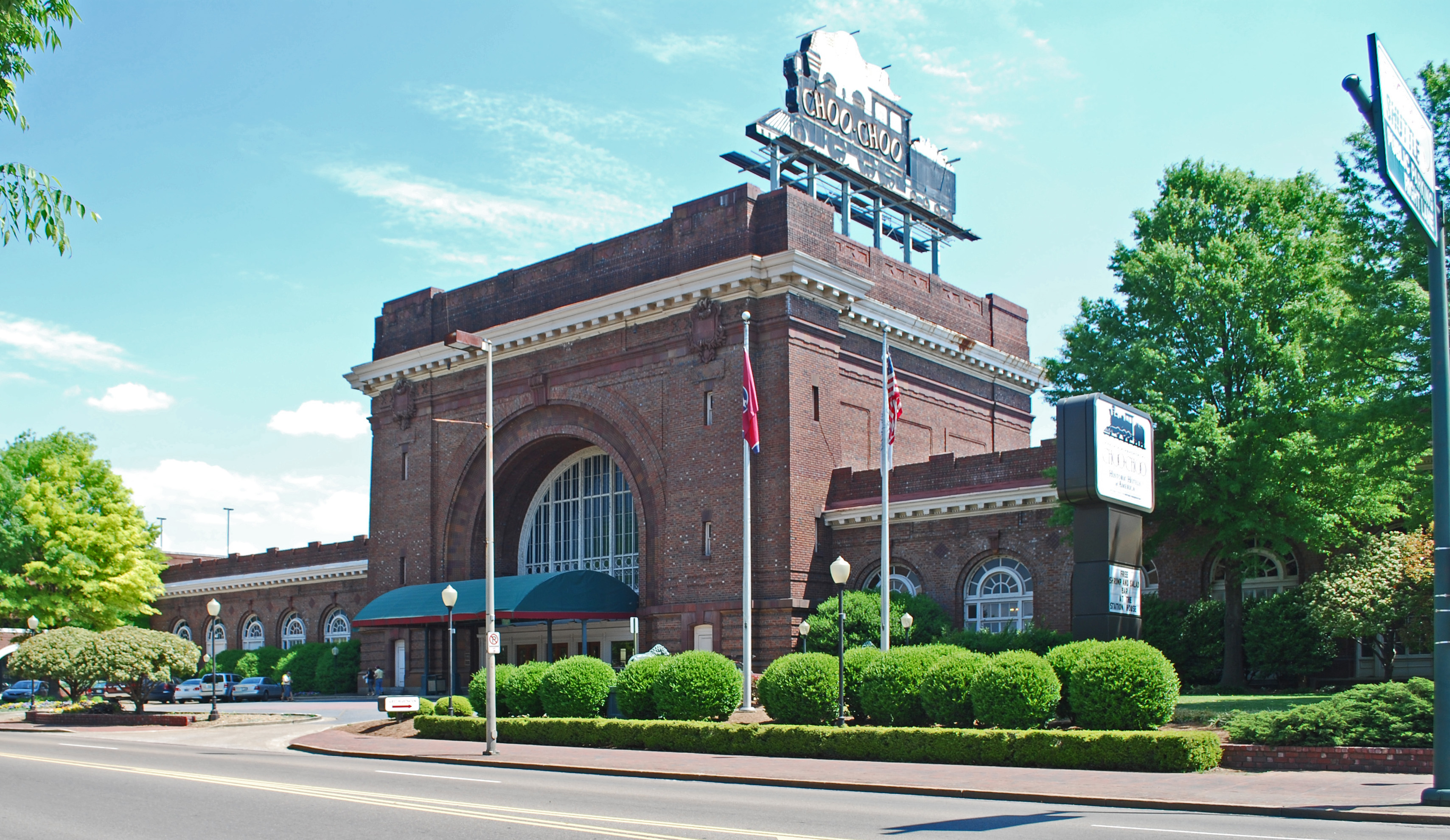
Terminal Station in Chattanooga, now known as the Chattanooga Choo-Choo Hotel

The song was written by the team of Mack Gordon and Harry Warren, allegedly while traveling on the Southern Railway's Birmingham Special train. This was one of three trains operating from New York City via Chattanooga. The Tennessean continued to Memphis while the Pelican continued to New Orleans via Birmingham. The Southern Railway operated these trains in cooperation with the Norfolk and Western Railway and the Pennsylvania Railroad.

Details in the song do not align with The Birmingham Special, however, which suggests that the writers took some artistic license. Specifically:

- The train is described as departing from Track 29 in Pennsylvania Station. At the time, the facility only had 21 tracks. It is not impossible that there was some confusion here with the train number, as the Birmingham Special's number was 29.
- "You leave the Pennsylvania station 'bout a quarter to four", but The Birmingham Special departed at 12:30 p.m.
- "Dinner in the diner, nothing could be finer than to have your ham 'n' eggs in Carolina", but none of these three trains passed through the Carolinas. They passed through western Virginia directly to East Tennessee.

== Personnel ==
On the May 7, 1941 original recording by Glenn Miller and His Orchestra in Hollywood on RCA Bluebird, the featured singer was Tex Beneke, who was accompanied by Paula Kelly, the Modernaires (vocals), Billy May, John Best, Ray Anthony, R. D. McMickle (trumpet), Glenn Miller, Jim Priddy, Paul Tanner, Frank D'Annolfo (trombone), Hal McIntyre, Wilbur Schwartz (clarinet, alto saxophone), Tex Beneke, Al Klink (tenor saxophone), Ernie Caceres (baritone saxophone), Chummy MacGregor (piano), Jack Lathrop (guitar), Trigger Alpert (bass), and Maurice Purtill (drums). The arrangement was by Jerry Gray.

== Notable renditions ==
The presentation of the gold disc
The world's first gold record was presented to Glenn Miller on 10 February 1942 at the CBS Playhouse in New York City

The song has been recorded by numerous artists, including Taco, Beegie Adair, the Andrews Sisters, Ray Anthony, Asleep at the Wheel with Willie Nelson, BBC Big Band, George Benson, John Bunch, Caravelli, Regina Carter, Ray Charles, Harry Connick Jr., Ray Conniff, John Denver, Ernie Fields, Stéphane Grappelli and Marc Fosset, John Hammond Jr., the Harmonizing Four, Harmony Grass, Ted Heath, Betty Johnson, Susannah McCorkle, Ray McKinley, Big Miller, the Muppets, Richard Perlmutter, Oscar Peterson, Spike Robinson, Harry Roy, Jan Savitt, Hank Snow, Teddy Stauffer, Dave Taylor, Claude Thornhill, the Tornados, Vox and Guy Van Duser.

Other notable performances include:

- Cab Calloway and His Orchestra recorded a cover version of "Chattanooga Choo Choo" for Conqueror Records in 1941.
- Carmen Miranda recorded a cover on July 25, 1942, and sang it in the movie Springtime in the Rockies.
- Bill Haley & His Comets released a cover of "Chattanooga Choo Choo" as a 45 single on Essex Records in 1954.
- Pianist Floyd Cramer recorded a single version on RCA Records in 1962.
- UK instrumental group the Shadows recorded a version of the song for their album Dance with the Shadows, which reached number two in the UK album charts in 1964.
- The American musical group Harpers Bizarre released a cover version of the song, which reached No. 45 on the U.S. pop chart and spent two weeks at No. 1 on the Easy Listening chart in 1968. In Canada, the song reached No. 34.
- An instrumental version of the theme was released 1975 in Germany under the name "Maddox", produced by Dicky Tarrach.
- In the 1974 film Young Frankenstein, when Dr. Frederick Frankenstein asks a local boy for directions to the Transylvania Station, their dialogue closely follows the song's lyrics.
- In 1978, the jazz-influenced disco group Tuxedo Junction recorded a disco version that hit the American Top 40; it peaked at No. 32 Pop and No. 18 on the Easy Listening chart. In Canada, it reached No. 55 on the Pop charts and No. 6 on the Dance charts.

== German and Dutch versions ==
- The tune was adopted twice for German songs. Both songs deal with trains, and both songs start with (different) translations of "pardon me". The first was created and performed in 1947 by the German pop singer Bully Buhlan (Zug nach Kötzschenbroda). The lyrics are humorously describing the bother of a train ride out of post-war Berlin: no guarantee to arrive at a destination due to coal shortage, passengers traveling on coach buffers, steps and roofs, and never-ending trip interruptions including a night stop for delousing.
- The second, Sonderzug nach Pankow, created by the German rock musician Udo Lindenberg in 1983 became very popular and had various political implications. Lindenberg was a West German singer and songwriter with a suitable fan community in East Germany. He had applied for years to tour East Germany but was rejected several times. The 1983 cover version of Chattanooga Choo Choo was directly asking the East Germany's leader Erich Honecker for permission to hold a concert in the Palace of the Republic (Berlin). The song was released on February 2, 1983. The song itself and the Glenn Miller original were temporarily interdicted in the GDR.

Nevertheless, Lindenberg finally succeeded in getting an invitation to the East German festival Rock for Peace on October 25, 1983, on the condition that Lindenberg would not play Sonderzug nach Pankow at the concert. Honecker, a former brass band drummer of Rotfrontkämpferbund, and Lindenberg exchanged presents in form of a leather jacket and a metal shawm in 1987. Lindenberg's success at passing the Inner German border peacefully with a humorous song gave him celebrity status as well as a positive political acknowledgement in both West and East Germany.

- Lindenberg's version was adapted by Dutch singer Willem Duyn as Ik Neem De Eerste Trein Naar Zandvoort (free translation; "I'll Take The Morning train to Zandvoort") who made it a summer-hit in 1983. In the lyrics Duyn chronicles chaos and mayhem on the morning seaside-train.

== Italian versions ==
- There is an Italian version sung by Domenico Loreti entitled Il treno della neve (The Snow Train) and one by Sorelle Marinetti included in the 2010 album Signorine novecento (Atlantic, 5051865974321).

== Finnish version ==
- A Finnish song based upon the Chattanooga Choo Choo was made in 1963 about "Ukko-Pekka", one of Finland's most famous locomotives. It was sung by Finnish band Eero ja Jussi & The Boys.

== Wartime release ==
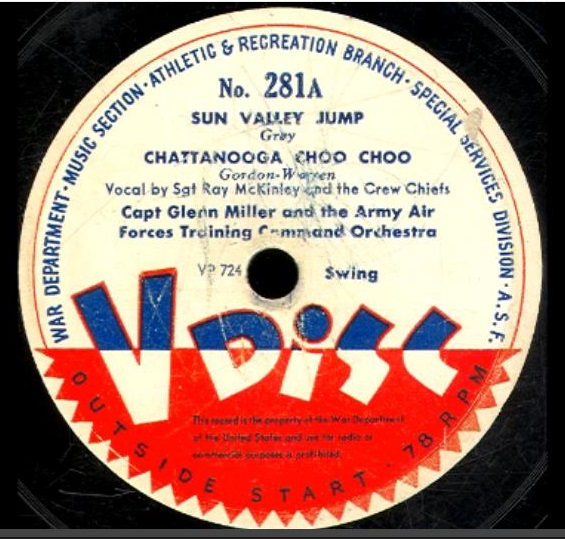
1944 release as a V-Disc by the U.S. War Department

In October 1944, a new recording by Captain Glenn Miller and the Army Air Forces Training Command Orchestra featuring Sgt. Ray McKinley and the Crew Chiefs on vocals was released as a V-Disc by the U.S. War Department, one of a series of recordings sent free by the U.S. War Department to overseas military personnel during World War II.

== Legacy and popular culture ==
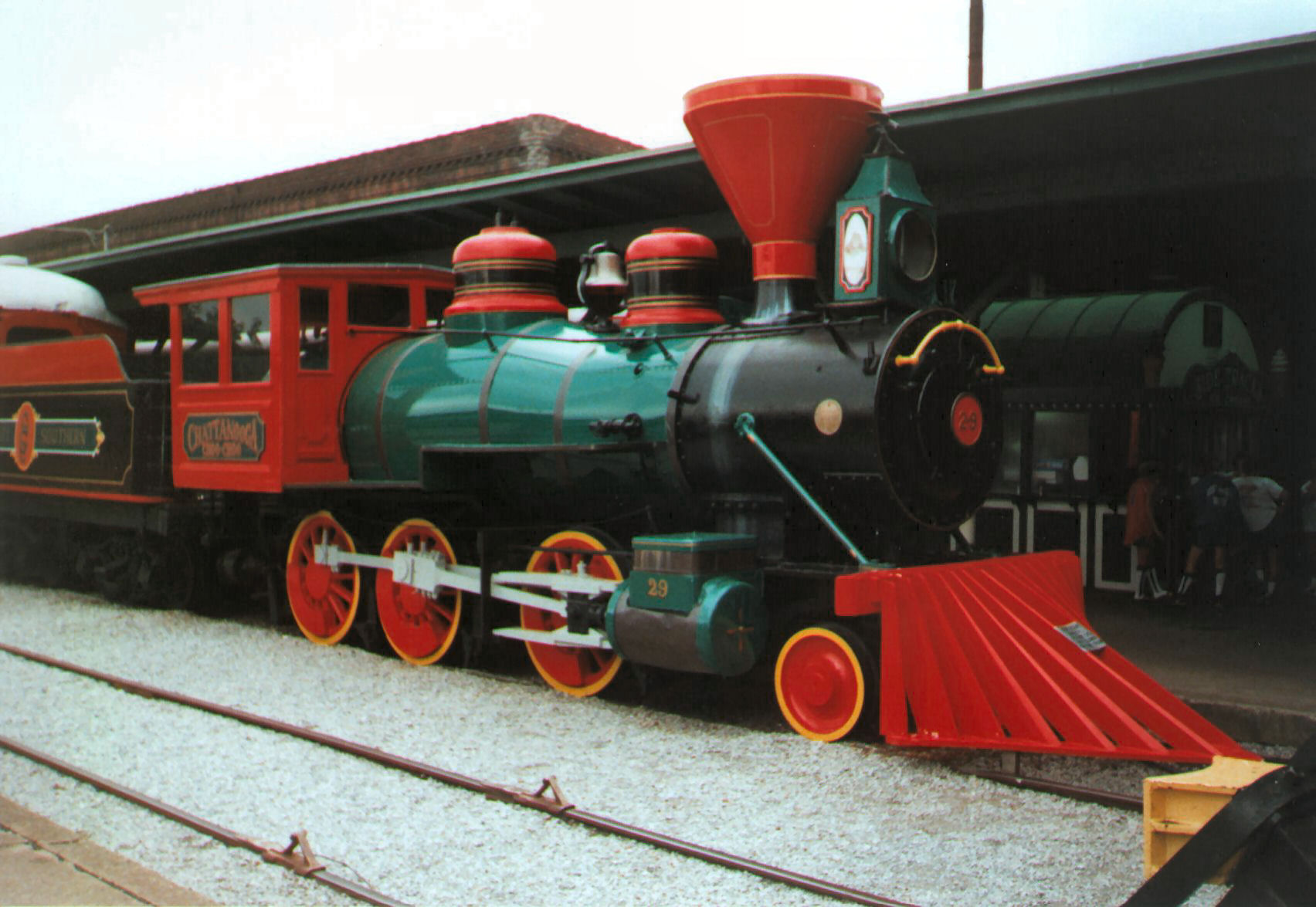
Trains are on permanent display at the Terminal Station, in Chattanooga, Tennessee.

Trains have a pride of place in Chattanooga's former Terminal Station. Once owned and operated by the Southern Railway, the station was saved from demolition after the withdrawal of passenger rail service in the early 1970s, and it is now part of a 30-acre (12-hectare) resort complex, including the Chattanooga Choo Choo Hotel, and numerous historical railway exhibits. Hotel guests can stay in half of a restored passenger railway car. Dining at the complex includes the Gardens restaurant in the Terminal Station itself, The Station House (which is housed in a former baggage storage room and known for its singing waitstaff) and the "Dinner in the Diner" which is housed in a restored 1941 Class A dining car. The music venue "Track29" is also on the grounds of the Chattanooga Choo Choo hotel in the building that formerly housed the city's only ice rink at the back of the property. The city's other historic station, Union Station, parts of which predated the Civil War, was demolished in 1973; the site is now an office building formerly housing the corporate offices of the Krystal restaurant chain (the restaurant chain offices have since relocated to Atlanta, Georgia). In addition to the railroad exhibits at "the Choo Choo", there are further exhibits at Tennessee Valley Railroad Museum, in east Chattanooga.

The reputation given to the city by the song also has lent itself to making Chattanooga the home of the National Model Railroad Association since 1982. In addition, the athletic mascot of the University of Tennessee at Chattanooga was, for a time, a rather menacing-looking anthropomorphized mockingbird named Scrappy, who was dressed as a railroad engineer and was sometimes depicted at the throttle of a steam locomotive.

Choo Choo DME, a radio aid to navigation, is sited near Chattanooga at 34°57′41″N 85°9′12″W.

== See also ==
- List of train songs
- List of number-one adult contemporary singles of 1968 (U.S.)
- Chattanoogie Shoe Shine Boy
