= (I've Got a Gal in) Kalamazoo =

1942 popular song recorded by Glenn Miller and His Orchestra

- 1942 sheet music cover, Bregman, Vocco & Conn, Inc., New York

Single by Glenn Miller and His Orchestra
- Published: 1942
- Genre: Popular
- Songwriters: Mack Gordon; Harry Warren

RCA Victor 78 rpm release, 27934-A

"(I've Got a Gal in) Kalamazoo" is a No. 1 popular song recorded by Glenn Miller and His Orchestra in 1942. It was written by Mack Gordon and Harry Warren and published in 1942. It was featured in the musical film Orchestra Wives and was recorded by Glenn Miller and His Orchestra, featuring Tex Beneke, Marion Hutton, and the Modernaires, who released it as an A side 78 rpm in 1942, 27934-A. The B side was "At Last".

== Background ==
The song popularized the city of Kalamazoo, Michigan. Although originally recorded by the Glenn Miller band with Tex Beneke on lead vocals, it was recreated by the fictional Gene Morrison Orchestra performing as the Glenn Miller Band and the Nicholas Brothers (performing the song as part of a dance sequence) in the 1942 20th Century Fox movie Orchestra Wives. The song was nominated for Best Music, Original Song at the Academy Awards, Harry Warren (music), Mack Gordon (lyrics).

The song was recorded on May 20, 1942 in Hollywood. The arrangement was by Jerry Gray. The personnel on "(I've Got a Gal in) Kalamazoo": Tex Beneke, Marion Hutton, the Modernaires (vocals), Billy May, John Best, Steve Lipkins, R.D. McMickle (trumpet), Glenn Miller, Jim Priddy, Paul Tanner, Frank D'Annolfo (trombone), Lloyd "Skip" Martin, Wilbur Schwartz (clarinet, alto saxophone), Tex Beneke, Al Klink (tenor saxophone), Ernie Caceres (baritone saxophone), Chummy MacGregor (piano), Bobby Hackett (guitar), Edward "Doc" Goldberg (string bass), and Maurice Purtill (drums).

== Reception ==
The Glenn Miller record was the year's best-selling recording in the United States, according to Billboard magazine. It spent nineteen weeks on the Billboard charts, including eight weeks in first place. The song was nominated for an Academy Award in the category of "Best Music, Original Song" in 1943.

== See also ==
- List of Billboard number-one singles of the 1940s
