= Tex Beneke =

American saxophonist, singer, and bandleader (1914–2000)

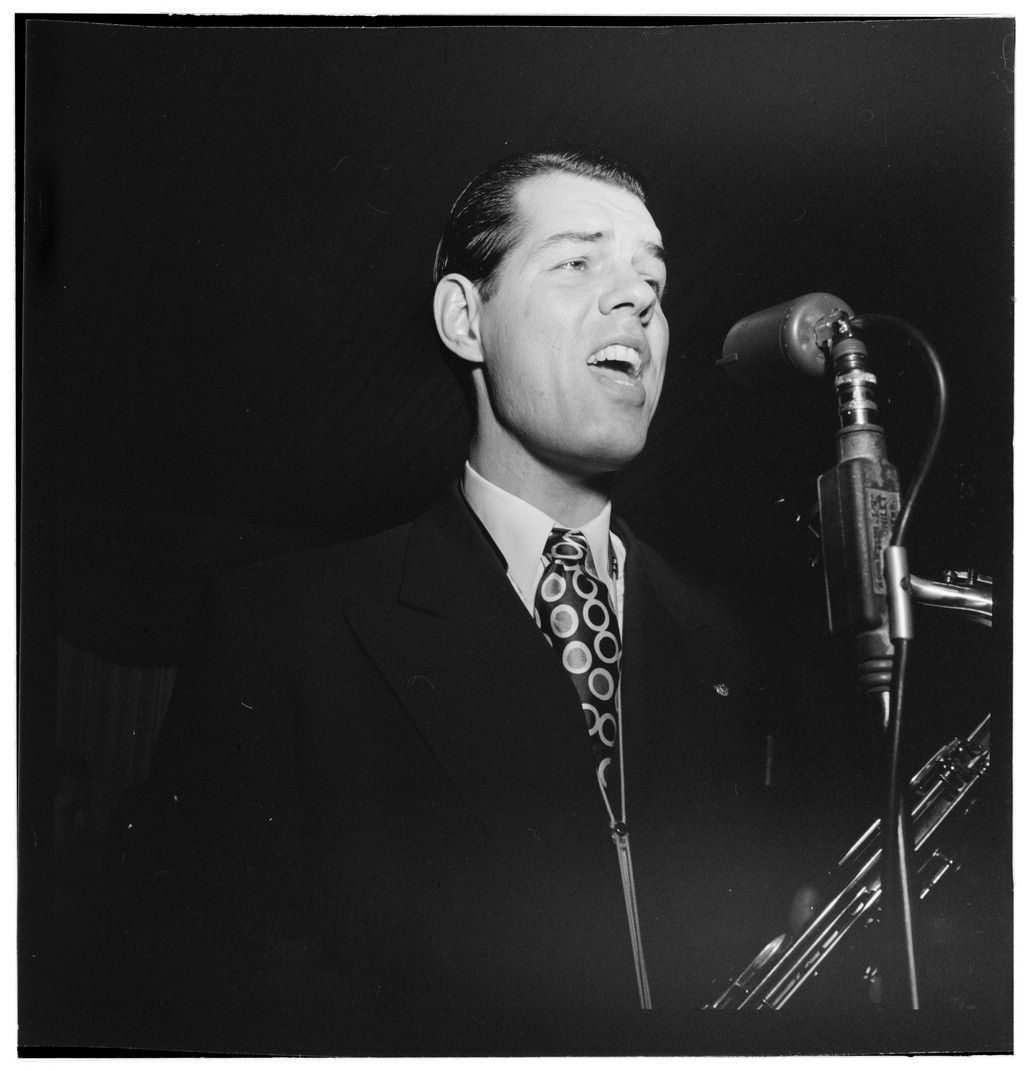
- Beneke in 1947; by William P. Gottlieb

Background information
- Born: Gordon Lee Beneke; February 12, 1914; Fort Worth, Texas, U.S.
- Died: May 30, 2000 (aged 86) Costa Mesa, California, U.S.
- Genres: Big band; swing; jazz; blues
- Occupations: Musician; bandleader
- Instruments: Tenor saxophone; vocals
- Years active: 1935 – 1998
- Labels: RCA Victor; Bluebird; Columbia; Time-Life
- Formerly of: Glenn Miller Orchestra; The Modernaires; Eydie Gormé; Ronnie Deauville; Henry Mancini; Norman Leyden
- Resting place: Greenwood Memorial Park, Fort Worth, Texas

Gordon Lee "Tex" Beneke (/ˈbɛnəki/ BEN-ə-kee; February 12, 1914 – May 30, 2000) was an American saxophonist, singer, and bandleader. His career is a history of associations with bandleader Glenn Miller and former musicians and singers who worked with Miller. His band is also associated with the careers of Eydie Gormé, Henry Mancini, and Ronnie Deauville. Beneke also solos on the recording the Glenn Miller Orchestra made of their popular song "In the Mood" and sings on another popular Glenn Miller recording, "Chattanooga Choo Choo". The jazz critic Will Friedwald considers Beneke to be one of the major blues singers who sang with the big bands of the early 1940s.

== Early life ==
Beneke was born in Fort Worth, Texas. He started playing saxophone at age nine, switching from soprano to alto to tenor saxophones and staying with the last.

== Career ==
His first professional work was with bandleader Ben Young in 1935, but when he joined the Glenn Miller Orchestra three years later, his career hit its stride. Beneke stated, "It seems that Gene Krupa had left the Goodman band and was forming his own first band. He was flying all over the country looking for new talent and he stopped at our ballroom one night [to listen to the Ben Young band]. [...] Gene wound up taking two or three of our boys with him back to New York. [Krupa] wanted to take [Beneke], but his sax section was already filled." Krupa knew that Glenn Miller was forming a band and recommended Beneke to Miller.

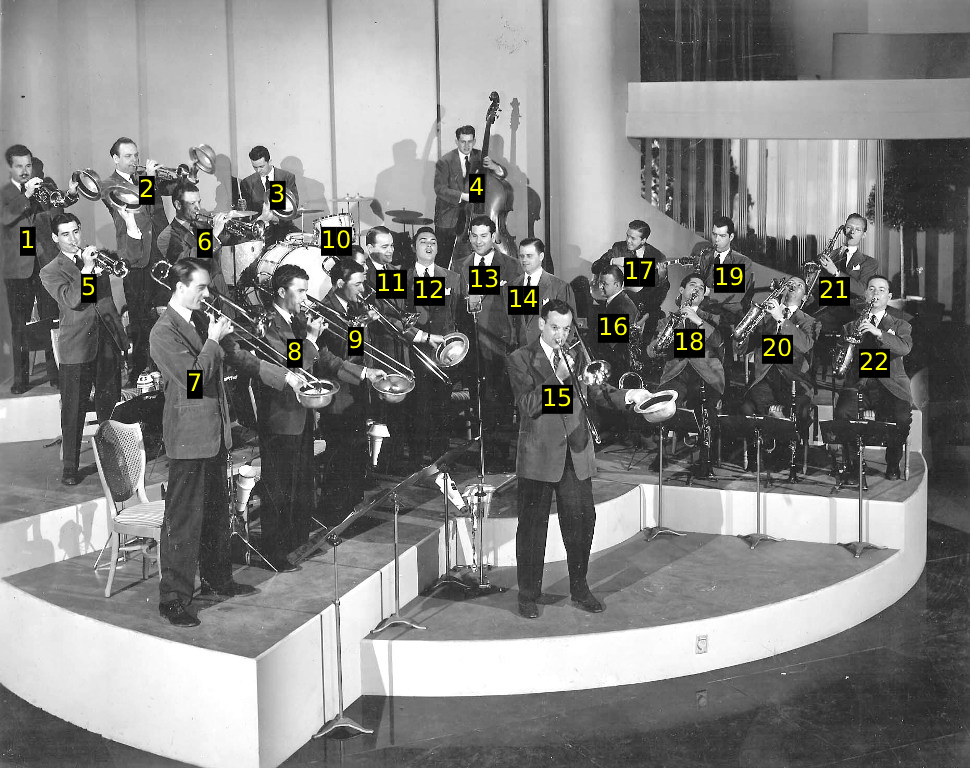
Beneke (no. 19) with the Glenn Miller Orchestra, c. 1940–1941

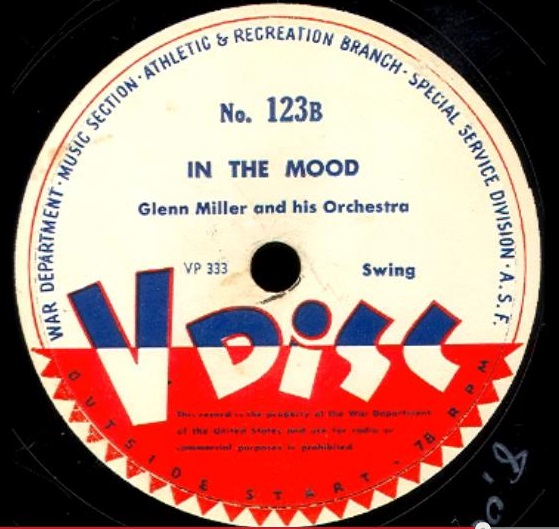
"In the Mood" by Glenn Miller and his Orchestra, released February, 1944, by the U.S. War Department (V-Disc 123B)

Whatever concerns Miller might have had about Beneke's playing were quickly dismissed; Miller immediately made Beneke his primary tenor saxophone soloist, and Beneke played all but a few of the tenor solos on all of the records and personal appearances made by the Miller band until it disbanded in 1942. On the August 1, 1939, recording made of the Joe Garland composition "In the Mood", Beneke trades two-measure tenor solo exchanges with his fellow section-mate Al Klink. Miller's 1941 recording of "A String of Pearls" (composed by the band's arranger, Jerry Gray) also has Beneke and Klink trading two-measure tenor solo phrases. Beneke appears with Miller and his band in the films Sun Valley Serenade (1941) and Orchestra Wives (1942), both of which helped propel the singer/saxophonist to the top of the Metronome polls. Tex Beneke is listed in the personnel of the 1941 Metronome All-Star Band led by Benny Goodman. In 1942, Glenn Miller's orchestra won the first gold record ever awarded for "Chattanooga Choo Choo"; the song was written by Harry Warren and Mack Gordon as part of the score for the 1941 Twentieth Century Fox movie Sun Valley Serenade, which was primarily made for the purpose of putting the Miller band in a motion picture. Tex Beneke was the featured singer in the movie and on the Victor/Bluebird recording that also featured band vocalist Paula Kelly and the Modernaires, a vocal group of four male singers, who were also regular members of the Miller entourage. "Chattanooga Choo Choo" (catalogue number Bluebird 11230-B) was recorded by the Miller band at the Victor recording studios in Hollywood, May 7, 1941. Hoping to repeat the success of "Chattanooga" the following year, songwriters Warren and Gordon composed "I've Got a Gal in Kalamazoo" for the Orchestra Wives score. That arrangement also featured Beneke both singing and soloing on the saxophone, the Modernaires and band vocalist Marion Hutton in a not-too-dissimilar fashion. Not surprisingly, "Kalamazoo" became another hit record for Miller, Beneke, and the band, though not to the extent that "Chattanooga" had been the year before. By then, the U.S. was involved in World War II and the success of "Kalamazoo" was also short-lived partially because Miller disbanded his group only three months after the record was made and four months following the filming of Orchestra Wives.

When Miller broke up the band in August 1942 to join the Army Air Force, Beneke played very briefly with Horace Heidt before joining the Navy himself, leading a Navy band in Oklahoma. While employed with Miller, Beneke was offered his own band, as Miller had done with colleagues and employees including Hal McIntyre, Claude Thornhill, and Charlie Spivak. Beneke wanted to come back to Miller after the war and learn more about leading a band before being given his own band. Beneke led two bands in the navy and kept in touch with Miller while they were both serving in the military. By 1945, Beneke felt ready to lead his own orchestra.

=== Working with the Miller estate ===
Glenn Miller went missing on December 15, 1944, while flying to France from England. After World War II, the United States Army Air Force decommissioned the Glenn Miller–led Army Air Force band. The Miller estate authorized an official Glenn Miller "ghost band" in 1946. This band was led by Tex Beneke, who as time went on had more prominence in the band's identity. It had a make-up similar to Glenn Miller's Army Air Force Band, having a large string section. The orchestra's official public debut was at the Capitol Theatre on Broadway, where it opened for a three-week engagement on January 24, 1946. Henry Mancini was the band's pianist and one of the arrangers. Another arranger was Norman Leyden, who also previously arranged for the Glenn Miller Army Air Force Band. This ghost band played to very large audiences all across the United States, including a few dates at the Hollywood Palladium in 1947, where the original Miller band played in 1941. The movie short "Tex Beneke and the Glenn Miller Band" was released by RKO Pictures in 1947 with Lillian Lane, Artie Malvin, and the Crew Chiefs vocal group performing. In a slightly sarcastic article in Time, from June 2, 1947, the magazine notes that the Beneke-led Miller orchestra was playing at the same venue the original Miller band played in 1939, the Glen Island Casino. Beneke's quote about the big-band business at the time closes the article: "I don't know whether Glenn figured that times would be as tough". By 1949, economics dictated that the string section be dropped.

This band recorded for RCA Victor, just as the original Miller band did. Beneke believed that Miller had promised him his own band in the early 1940s, and this was his chance to have that promise fulfilled. Beneke wanted a band with his own new musical identity. Larry Bruff, an announcer for the earlier Glenn Miller radio shows, said, "Beneke would even set wrong tempos so as not to sound too much like Glenn." The Miller estate wanted a band that was primarily associated with Glenn Miller, playing the Glenn Miller songs in the Glenn Miller style. By 1950, Beneke and the Miller estate parted ways.

=== After Miller ===
Beneke continued to perform under his own name with no official connection to Miller. He enjoyed less success in the early 1950s, partly because he was limited to smaller recording labels such as Coral Records and partly because of competition from other Miller alumni and imitators such as Jerry Gray, Ray Anthony, and Ralph Flanagan. Eydie Gormé sang with the Beneke band in 1950. Beneke appeared on Cavalcade of Bands, a television show in 1950 on the DuMont Television Network.

In the latter part of that decade, some revived interest arose in music of the swing era. Beneke joined a number of other leaders such as Larry Clinton and Glen Gray in making new high fidelity recordings of their earlier hits, often featuring many of the original musicians. Beneke and former Miller singers Ray Eberle, Paula Kelly, and the Modernaires first recorded the LP Reunion in Hi-Fi, a 1958 Coral Records album that contained recreations of original Miller material. This was followed by others featuring newer songs, some performed in the Miller style and others done in a more contemporary mode. Among the best-known is Christmas Serenade in the Glenn Miller Style (1965) on Columbia Records, which has been excerpted on a number of holiday compilations.

The singer/saxophonist continued working in the coming decades, appearing periodically at Disneyland. He also made the rounds of various talk shows that had musical connections, including those hosted by Merv Griffin and Johnny Carson. His appearances on The Tonight Show sometimes included duos with fellow Miller veteran Al Klink, who was by then a key member of the Tonight Show Band. Ray Eberle recovered from his earlier illness and resumed performing with Beneke and the Modernaires for a period in the early 1970s. In 1972, Beneke agreed to re-record some of his Miller vocals for Time-Life Records' set of big band recreations, The Swing Era, produced and conducted by yet another Miller alumnus, Billy May.

During the 1970s and 1980s, Beneke had a new band playing a style that resembled the classic Miller sound, however with as much newer material as older. In the late 1970s, he played at Knott's Berry Farms Cloud 9 Ballroom. At one point, he also toured with former Jimmy Dorsey vocalists Helen O'Connell and Bob Eberly. Beneke suffered a stroke in the mid-1990s and was forced to give up the saxophone but continued to conduct and sing. In 1991, Tex Beneke received a star on the Hollywood Walk of Fame with funds collected by co-leader Gary Tole. He settled in Costa Mesa, California, and remained active toward the end of that decade, mostly touring the U.S. West Coast and still playing in something resembling the Miller style. In 1998, he launched yet another tour paying tribute to the Army Air Force Band.

== Death ==
In 2000, Beneke died from respiratory failure at a nursing home in Costa Mesa, California, aged 86, and was buried in Greenwood Memorial Park in Fort Worth, Texas. He was survived by his wife, Sandra, of Santa Ana, California. His saxophone is currently used by the Arizona Opry.

== See also ==
- Kalamazoo, Michigan
