= Joseph Winner =

American songwriter (1837–1918)

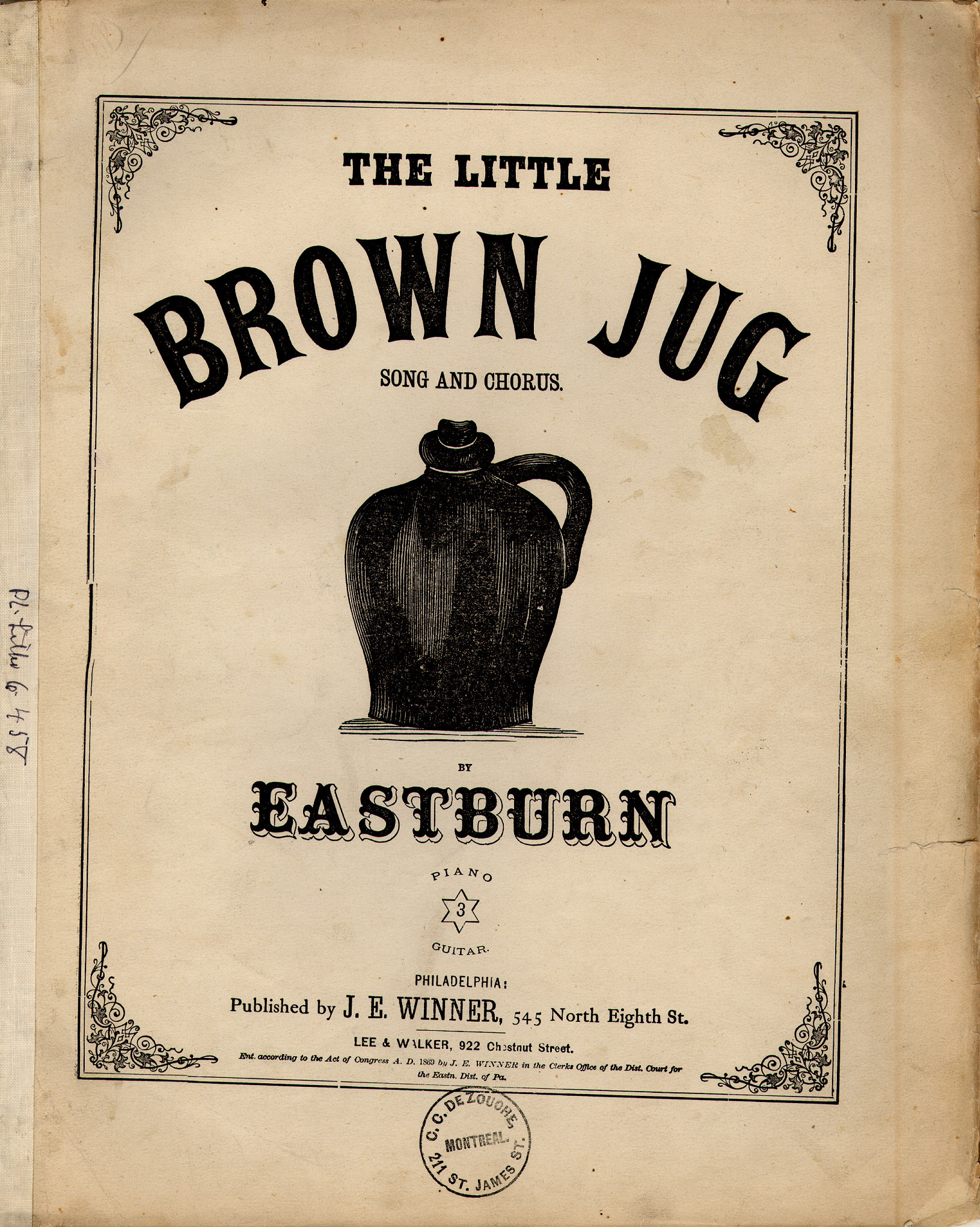
"Little Brown Jug" sheet music cover, 1869

Joseph Eastburn Winner (c. 1837–1918) was an American composer and music publisher. He is best known for his tune "The Little Brown Jug" (1869). He was born in Philadelphia, Pennsylvania, where he operated a publishing business from 1854 to 1907. He sometimes used the pseudonym R. A. Eastburn on his compositions. From 1845 to 1854 he partnered with his brother, the composer Septimus Winner, in the music publishing business.
