= American Patrol =

American patriotic song written in 1885 by F.W. Meacham

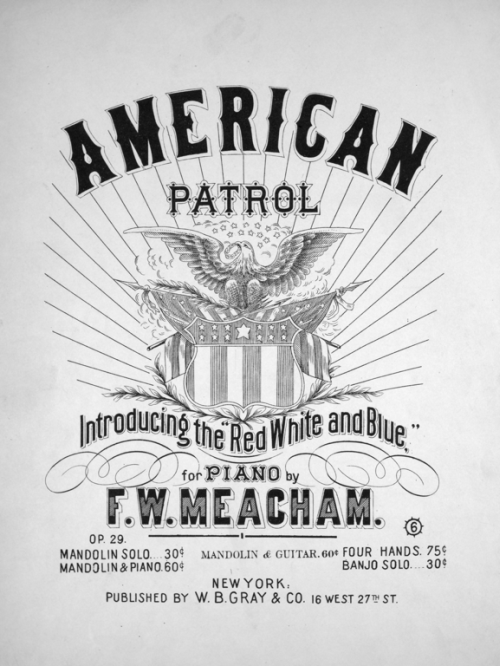
- Sheet music cover (1885)

Song
- Written: 1885
- Published: 1891
- Genre: March
- Composer: F. W. Meacham

Audio sample
- "American Patrol" as performed by the United States Marine Band: file; help

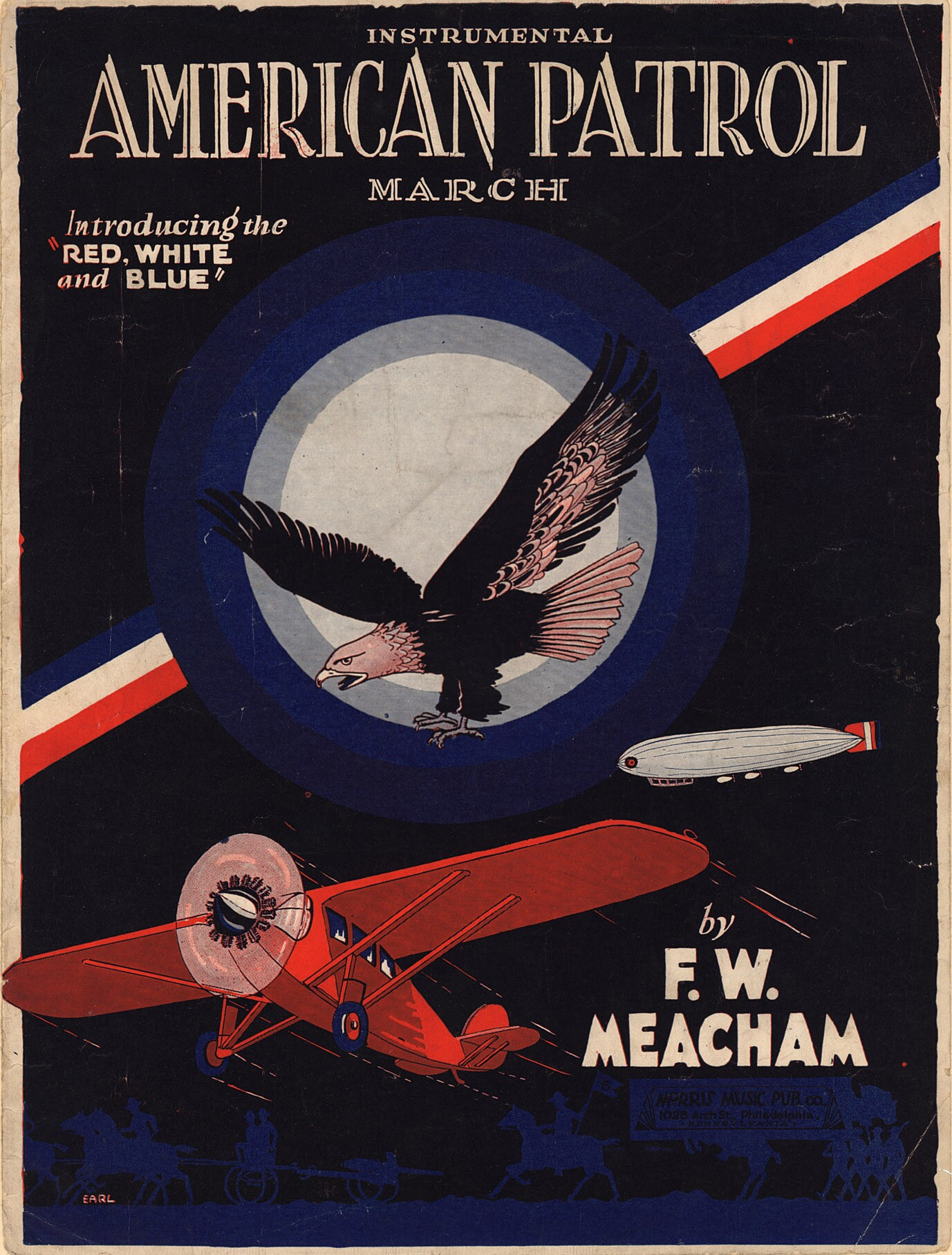
1914 sheet music cover.

"American Patrol" is a popular march written by Frank White (F.W.) Meacham in 1885. It incorporates both original musical themes by Meacham and melodies from American patriotic songs of the era such as "Columbia, the Gem of the Ocean," "Dixie," and "Yankee Doodle." Composed for piano, it was then arranged for wind band and published by Carl Fischer in 1891. Copyright was assigned to Meacham's widow, Cora, in 1912 and renewed in 1919. The 1885 and 1914 printings for piano do not include "Dixie."

Glenn Miller's Orchestra recorded a swing version of the march arranged by Jerry Gray in 1942 which was released as a 78 single on Victor Records.

Morton Gould later composed his own unusual and often dissonant "American Patrol for 3 Bands."

The "patrol" format, also used in Beethoven's Turkish March, was popular in the second half of the 19th century, and other compositions bear titles such as "Turkish Patrol," "Ethiopian Patrol," "Owl's Patrol," "Welsh Patrol" and "Arab Patrol." The format was intended to represent a military band approaching, passing, and fading into the distance. It typically included an introduction played p or pp, in imitation of bugle calls or drums, then themes played progressively louder until a recapitulation of the first themes, gradually dying away and finishing pp, ppp, or even pppp. The original piano version of "American Patrol" follows this scheme.

== Performances ==
"American Patrol" was performed by the Marine Band on July 2, 1892, in Portland, Oregon.

The 1893 Annual Meeting of the American Street-Railway Association included a performance of "American Patrol" by Clauder's Exposition Band. Also, in 1893, Conterno's Band and Orchestra performed it as part of their concert at Paradise Park in New York.

In 1896, Halle's Concert Band performed it as part of Fourth of July celebrations at Winthrop Park in New York City.

The Professor, played by Russell Johnson, performed the song on a flute on the television series Gilligan's Island in episode 26, "Music Hath Charm".

1942 RCA Victor 78 single release, 27873A.

RCA Victor 78 reissue, 20-1564-A, by Glenn Miller and His Orchestra, as part of the 1945 78 album Glenn Miller.

Glenn Miller recorded the song on April 2, 1942, while his band was in Hollywood filming the 20th Century-Fox musical film Orchestra Wives in a big band arrangement by Jerry Gray, where the theme "The Girl I Left Behind" can be also heard as an overlay. The arrangement was published by the Mutual Music Society in New York City. The song was released as a Victor 78 single, 27873A, backed with "Soldier, Let Me Read Your Letter". The recording was reissued as RCA Victor 20-1564-A backed with "Song of the Volga Boatmen" as Side 1 on the four disc 78 album, P-148, Glenn Miller. The record reached no. 15 on Billboard in 1942.

The musicians on the Glenn Miller studio recording were: Saxes: Tex Beneke, Wilbur Schwartz, Ernie Caceres, Al Klink, Lloyd "Skip" Martin; Trumpets: John Best, R. D. McMickle, Billy May, Steve Lipkins; Trombones: Glenn Miller, Jimmy Priddy, Paul Tanner, Frank D'Annolfo; Piano: Chummy MacGregor; String Bass: Edward "Doc" Goldberg; Guitar: Bobby Hackett; Drums: Moe Purtill.

In 1954 the Universal-International Orchestra, conducted by Joseph Gershenson, recorded a version of American Patrol (Decca Records, 9–29017), inserted in the LP The Glenn Miller Story of the same year (Decca Records, A-952).

The song was also recorded for the 1983 CD album, "In the Digital Mood", by the Glenn Miller Orchestra's touring ghost band.

== See also ==
- Four Buddies (song)
