= Tuxedo Junction =

1939 song recorded by Glenn Miller and His Orchestra

- 1940 sheet music cover for the Glenn Miller recording, Lewis Music, New York

Song by Glenn Miller and His Orchestra
- Released: 1939
- Label: RCA Bluebird
- Composers: Erskine Hawkins, Bill Johnson, Julian Dash
- Lyricist: Buddy Feyne (vocal version)

"Tuxedo Junction" is a popular big band song recorded by Glenn Miller and His Orchestra, becoming a No. 1 hit in 1940. The music was written by Erskine Hawkins, Bill Johnson, and Julian Dash and the lyrics by Buddy Feyne. The song was introduced by Erskine Hawkins and His Orchestra, a college dance band previously known as the Bama State Collegians. RCA released it in 1939 and it climbed to #7 on the American pop charts.

== Background ==
In the late 1930s Hawkins and his Orchestra were one of the house bands at the Savoy Ballroom. They alternated with the Chick Webb band and often used "Tuxedo Junction" as their sign-off song before the next band would take the stage so that the dancing would continue uninterrupted.

A live 6 1/2-minute version of the song by the Hawkins Orchestra exists, with extended solos from Hawkins on the trumpet, Paul Bascomb and Julian Dash on tenor saxophones, and Haywood Henry on the clarinet. It was recorded as an aircheck in the summer of 1942 at the Blue Room club in New York City.

The song was written as an instrumental. When it was given to Lewis Music Publishing, they sent it to several prospective lyricists to see who could write the best words for the song. Buddy Feyne asked Erskine Hawkins why he titled it "Tuxedo Junction." Erskine explained that the Junction was a whistle stop on the "Chitlin' Circuit". That information inspired Feyne's lyrics, which Hawkins preferred to the other submissions. Once the song had been published, American bands added it to their playlists.

The song is about a jazz and blues club in the Birmingham, Alabama suburb of Ensley. The area is referred to as "Tuxedo Junction", though the building is called the "Nixon Building" (built in 1922). This is due to the location of a streetcar crossing at Tuxedo Park, hence "Tuxedo Junction". A punk rock venue bearing the same name operated near there briefly in the mid-1980s.

== 1940 Glenn Miller recording ==
Glenn Miller and His Orchestra had the most successful recording of the song (Billboard No. 1). Miller's arrangement slowed down the tempo and added trumpet fanfares. The trumpet lick in the original recording was played by band member Johnny Best. The main soloists on that recording were Best and Bobby Hackett. The Glenn Miller recording sold 115,000 copies in the first week. It was featured in the 1953 Glenn Miller biopic The Glenn Miller Story starring James Stewart and Harry Morgan.

The Glenn Miller Orchestra recorded the song on February 5, 1940, in New York. The musicians on the Glenn Miller recording were: Saxes: Hal McIntyre, Tex Beneke, Wilbur Schwartz, Jimmy Abato, Al Klink; Trumpets: Clyde Hurley, Johnny Best, R. D. McMickle, Legh Knowles; Trombones: Glenn Miller, Tommy Mack, Paul Tanner, Frank D'Annolfo; Piano: Chummy MacGregor; String Bass: Rowland Bundock; Guitar: Richard Fisher; Drums: Moe Purtill. The B side of the RCA Bluebird 78 single was "Danny Boy (Londonderry Air)".

The Glenn Miller single on Bluebird Records

== Other recordings ==
"Tuxedo Junction" was covered by numerous bands and swing orchestras and solo artists, including The Andrews Sisters, Ella Fitzgerald, Duke Ellington, Georgia Lee, Harry James, Frankie Avalon and Joe Jackson. Stan Kenton included it on his 1961 Mellophonium Magic album. It became the theme song for The Manhattan Transfer, first recorded on their album The Manhattan Transfer in 1975. Bob Marley used this song as an inspiration for his hit "Kaya". It was also the inspiration for an all-girl disco group, entitled "Tuxedo Junction".

The song was used in the movies The Glenn Miller Story, The Gene Krupa Story, and the Woody Allen film The Curse of the Jade Scorpion.
