= Moonlight Serenade =

1939 swing ballad by Glenn Miller

- 1939, Robbins Music.

Song by Glenn Miller
- Published: 1939
- Composer: Glenn Miller
- Lyricist: Mitchell Parish

"Moonlight Serenade"
- RCA Victor Bluebird 78, 1939

Single by Glenn Miller and His Orchestra
- A-side: "Sunrise Serenade"
- Released: 1939
- Recorded: April 4, 1939
- Studio: RCA Victor, New York City
- Genre: Dance band
- Length: 3:22
- Label: Bluebird
- Composer: Glenn Miller
- Producer: Glenn Miller

"Moonlight Serenade" is an American swing ballad composed by Glenn Miller with subsequent lyrics by Mitchell Parish. It was an immediate phenomenon when released in May 1939 as an instrumental arrangement, though it had been adopted and performed as Miller's signature tune as early as 1938, even before it had been given the name "Moonlight Serenade". In 1991, Miller's recording of "Moonlight Serenade" was inducted into the Grammy Hall of Fame.

== Background ==
"Moonlight Serenade" released as Army V-Disc 39A, VP 75, Theme Song, by the U.S. War Department in November 1943

Glenn Miller studied the Schillinger technique with Joseph Schillinger, who is credited with helping Miller create the "Miller sound", and under whose tutelage he composed "Moonlight Serenade".

The song evolved from a 1935 version entitled "Now I Lay Me Down to Weep", with music by Miller and lyrics by Edward Heyman to a version called "Gone with the Dawn" with lyrics by George Simon, and "The Wind in the Trees" with lyrics by Mitchell Parish. In his biography of Miller, George T. Simon recounted how vocalist Al Bowlly of the Ray Noble Orchestra sang him the Heyman lyrics to "Now I Lay Me Down to Weep" in 1935. The Noble Orchestra never recorded the song. Finally it ended up as "Moonlight Serenade" because Robbins Music bought the music and learned that Miller was recording a cover of "Sunrise Serenade", a Frankie Carle associated song for RCA Victor. They thought "Moonlight" would be a natural association for "Sunrise".

Jazz critic Gary Giddins wrote about the song's impact and legacy; "Miller exuded little warmth on or off the bandstand, but once the band struck up its theme, audiences were done for: throats clutched, eyes softened. Can any other record match 'Moonlight Serenade' for its ability to induce a Pavlovian slobber in so many for so long?" (The New Yorker, May 24, 2004).

== Wartime release ==
The 1939 RCA Victor studio recording of "Moonlight Serenade" was released by the U.S. War Department as Army V-Disc 39A, VP 75, Theme Song, in November 1943. The recording was also released as the Navy V-Disc No. 160A and the Marine Corps V-Disc No. 160A. A V-Disc test pressing of a recording of the song from November 17, 1945 by the AAF Band was made but the disc was not issued. A new recording by Glenn Miller with the American Band of the Allied Expeditionary Forces (AEF) was broadcast to Germany in 1944 on the radio program The Wehrmacht Hour.

== Chart performance ==
The song was recorded on April 4, 1939 at the RCA Victor Studios in New York City and released on the RCA Bluebird label. It was a Top Ten hit on the U.S. pop charts in 1939, reaching number three on the Billboard charts, where it stayed for a total of fifteen weeks. It was the fifth most popular hit of 1939 in the Billboard year-end tally, where Miller had five records in the top 20.

In the UK, "Moonlight Serenade" was released as the A-side of a 78 for His Master's Voice (catalogue number B.D.5942) with "American Patrol" as the B-side. The recording reached number twelve in the UK in March 1954, staying on the chart for one week. In January 1976 on a maxi single with "Little Brown Jug" and "In the Mood", "Moonlight Serenade" reached number thirteen on the UK charts, in a chart run of eight weeks. The recording was also issued as a V-Disc in November 1943.

== Sources ==
- Flower, John. Moonlight Serenade: A Bio-discography of the Glenn Miller Civilian Band. New Rochelle, NY: Arlington House, 1972.
- Simon, George Thomas. Simon Says. New York: Galahad, 1971. ISBN 0-88365-001-0.
- Simon, George Thomas. Glenn Miller and His Orchestra. NY: Crowell, 1974.
