= Little Brown Jug (song) =

Song

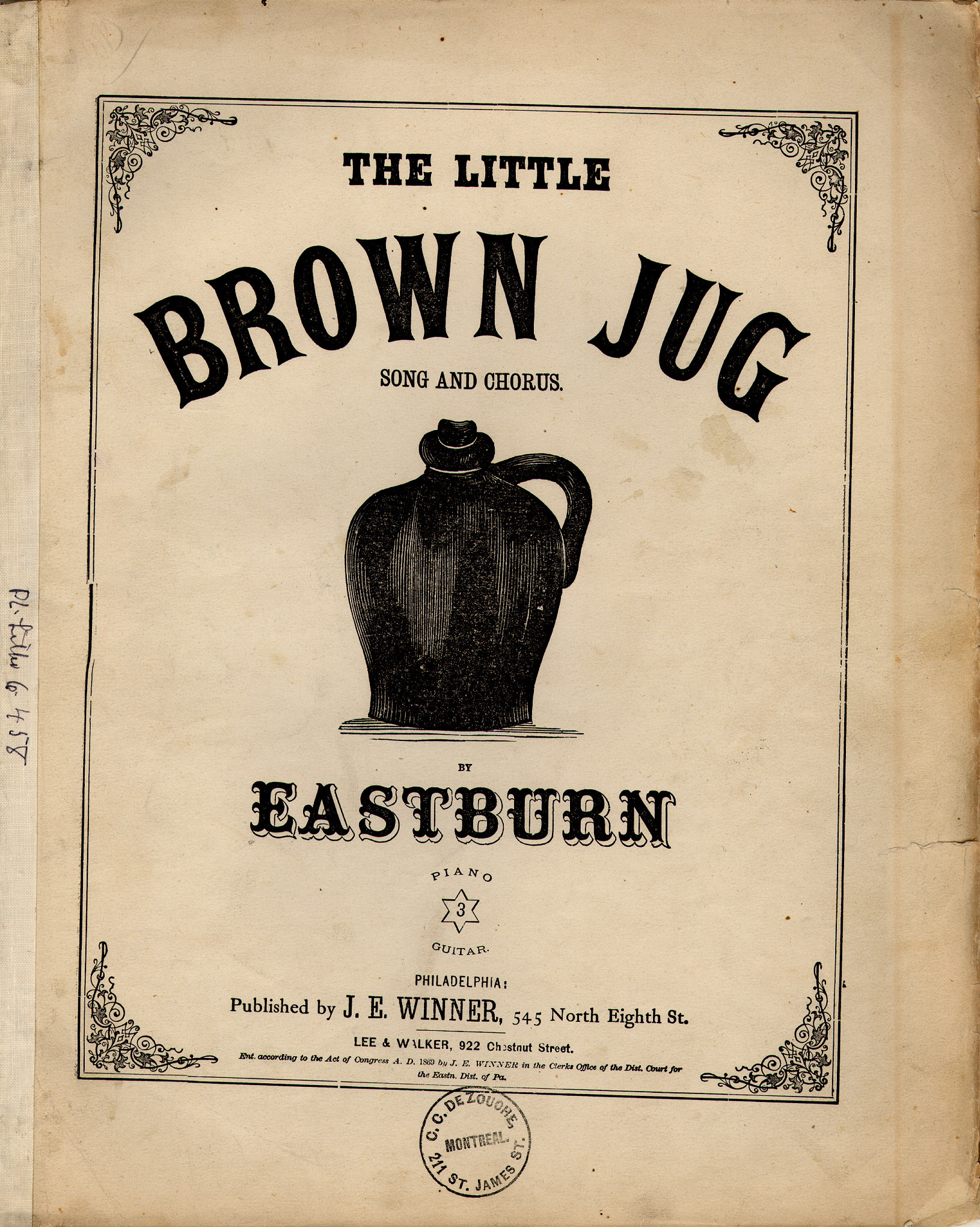
Original 1869 sheet music cover

"Little Brown Jug" is a song written in 1869 by Joseph Eastburn Winner, originally published in Philadelphia with the author listed as Winner's middle name "Eastburn".

== Background ==
It was originally a drinking song. It remained well known as a folk song into the early 20th century. Like many songs which make reference to alcohol, it enjoyed new popularity during the Prohibition era.

== 1939 Glenn Miller recording ==
1939 Glenn Miller recording on RCA Bluebird, B-10286-A

1953 sheet music cover from the film The Glenn Miller Story, Lew Music, New York

In 1939, Glenn Miller and His Orchestra released a hit version of the song on RCA Bluebird, as an A side 78 single, B-10286-A, in a new arrangement by Bill Finegan backed with "Pavanne". The recording was an early chart hit for Glenn Miller. The song was performed in Glenn Miller's Carnegie Hall concert that year and became a staple of the Glenn Miller Orchestra repertoire, and a classic of the Big Band era.

The personnel on the Glenn Miller recording: Saxes: Hal McIntyre, Tex Beneke, Wilbur Schwartz, Stanley Aronson, Al Klink; Trumpets: Bob Price, R. D. McMickle, Legh Knowles; Trombones: Glenn Miller, Paul Tanner, Al Mastren; Piano: Chummy MacGregor; String Bass: Rowland Bundock; Guitar: Allen Reuss; Drums: Moe Purtill.

The song was featured in and was central to the plot of the 1954 Universal Pictures film biography The Glenn Miller Story starring James Stewart and June Allyson. The Universal International Orchestra under the direction of Joseph Gershenson released a recording of the song from The Glenn Miller Story soundtrack as a single backed with "A String of Pearls" on Decca Records in the U.S. and on Brunswick Records in the UK in 1954.

== Other versions ==
Subsequently, in 1946 it was recorded by the accordionist John Serry Sr. and the guitarist Tony Mottola with the noted Joe Biviano Accordion & Rhythm Sextette for Sonora records. A copy of the recording Accordion Capers (Sonora, MS-476) has been archived within the permanent collection of the Smithsonian Institution's National Museum of American History.

It was also sung by Carl "Alfalfa" Switzer and Harold "Slim" Switzer in an Our Gang (Little Rascals) short.

== Lyrics ==
The song's lyrics are about a man and his wife and their hard life due to alcoholism. The tone and tune, however, are bright and cheerful, indicating the irony of the singer not knowing his degraded condition. The first verse of the song is:

My wife and I live all alone,
In a little log hut, we called our own
She loved gin, and I loved rum
I tell you what we'd lots of fun.

In the 1948 Famous Studios Screen Song animated short titled "Little Brown Jug", a "bouncing ball" cartoon, it is sung with the music credited to Winston Sharples and entirely new lyrics by Buddy Kaye.

== Other recordings ==
The song has been recorded by the following performers in addition to those listed above:

External audio
- You may hear Little Brown Jug performed by the Joe Biviano Accordion and Rhythm Sextette with John Serry and Tony Mottola in 1946; Here on Archive.org

- Joe Biviano, his Accordion and Rhythm Sextette including John Serry and Tony Mottola released a recording of the song as a 78 on Sonora Records.

Sang by Ann Sheridan in the 1939 film Dodge City.
