= List of Glenn Miller Orchestra (1937–1942) members =

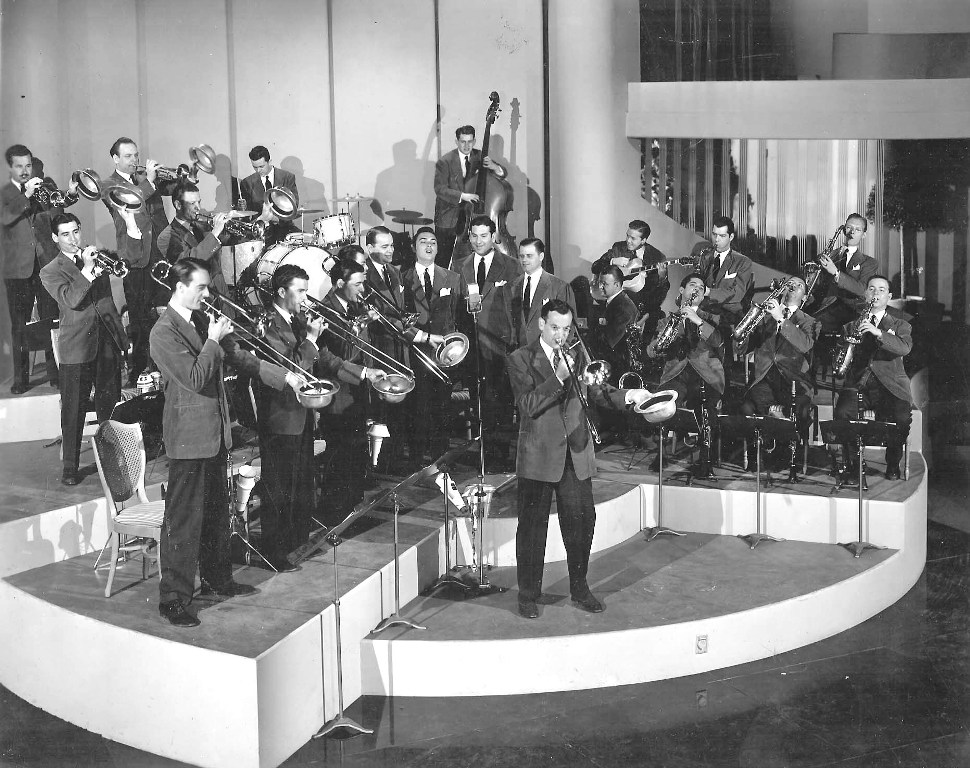
The Glenn Miller Orchestra onstage in 1941.

The Glenn Miller Orchestra was an American big band fronted by trombonist Glenn Miller. First formed in early 1937 as a spin-off of Ray Noble's band, the group included numerous musicians during its five-year existence, before disbanding in September 1942 when Miller enlisted in the U.S. Army. Some of the longest-standing members in the band included alto saxophonist Hal McIntyre, who was a constant member from its formation until October 1941; pianist John "Chummy" MacGregor, the only member from the first band who remained in September 1942; trombonist Paul Tanner, who joined in September 1938 and remained until the end; trumpeter Johnny Best, a mainstay for over three years; and vocalist Ray Eberle, who was featured on more recordings than any other singer between 1938 and 1942.

== History ==
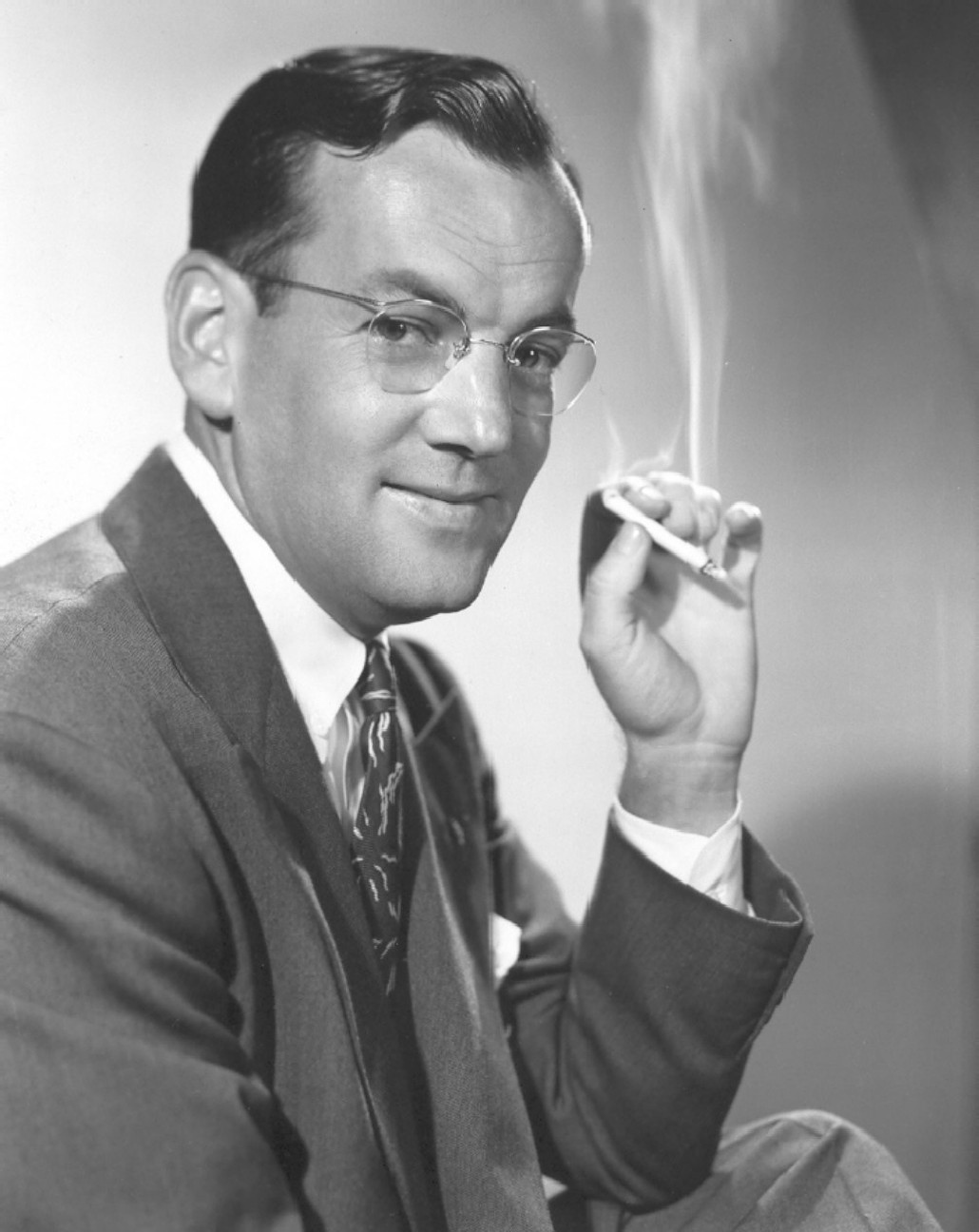
Glenn Miller formed his own band in early 1937.

=== First band ===
After a stint as a member of pianist Ray Noble's band, Glenn Miller started the process of forming his own group during late-1936. Working with drummer and Metronome magazine writer George T. Simon, three of the earliest musicians he enlisted were alto saxophonist Hal McIntyre, tenor saxophonist Johnny Harrell and trumpeter Sterling "Bozo" Bose. The rest of the lineup consisted of a range of "young musicians", who started rehearsing together during early 1937. In March, the band completed its first recording session for Decca Records, for which Miller brought in a range of experienced performers to stand in for some of his newer recruits. A lineup composed of trumpeters Charlie Spivak, Mannie Klein and Bose, trombonists Jesse Ralph and Harry Rodgers, saxophonists George Siravo, McIntyre (both alto), Jerry Jerome and Carl Biesecker (both tenor), pianist Howard Smith, guitarist Dick McDonough, bassist Ted Kotsoftis and drummer Smith recorded six songs, which were released across three singles later that year.

Miller's band performed live for the first time at the beginning of May, by which time Klein, Smith and Simon had been replaced by Chuck "Tweet" Peterson, John "Chummy" MacGregor and Emery "Eak" Kenyon, respectively. For a Brunswick Records session early the next month, Ralph Capelli, Cassius "Bud" Smith, Bill Peyser and Roland "Rolly" Bundock took over from Bose, Rodgers, McDonough and Kotsoftis, respectively. The group started its first live residency in mid-June, by which time Spivak had been replaced by Jimmy Troutman and Kathleen Lane had joined on vocals, replacing Violet "Vi" Mele after a brief stint. Before the end of the ten-week residency, Irving "Fazola" Prestopnik joined as a fifth saxophonist in place of the band's guitarist; and by the end of August, Capelli had been replaced by Bob Price. During the band's next residency, Adolph "Buddy" Schultz replaced Kenyon, although by October his place had been taken by Ennis "Doc" Carney; at the same time, Ardell Garrett replaced Troutman.

After the band recorded six tracks for three singles on Brunswick in November and December, Garrett and Siravo were replaced by Tommy DiCarlo and Tony Viola, respectively. On December 17, Peterson was replaced by Les Beigel, and on Christmas Day, Maurice "Moe" Purtill took over Carney's place; when he had to return to Tommy Dorsey's band the next day, however, the drummer was replaced by Vic Angle. With his band's popularity at an all-time low, Miller informed his bandmates that he would be disbanding his orchestra in the new year, with a final show taking place on January 2, 1938.

=== Second band ===
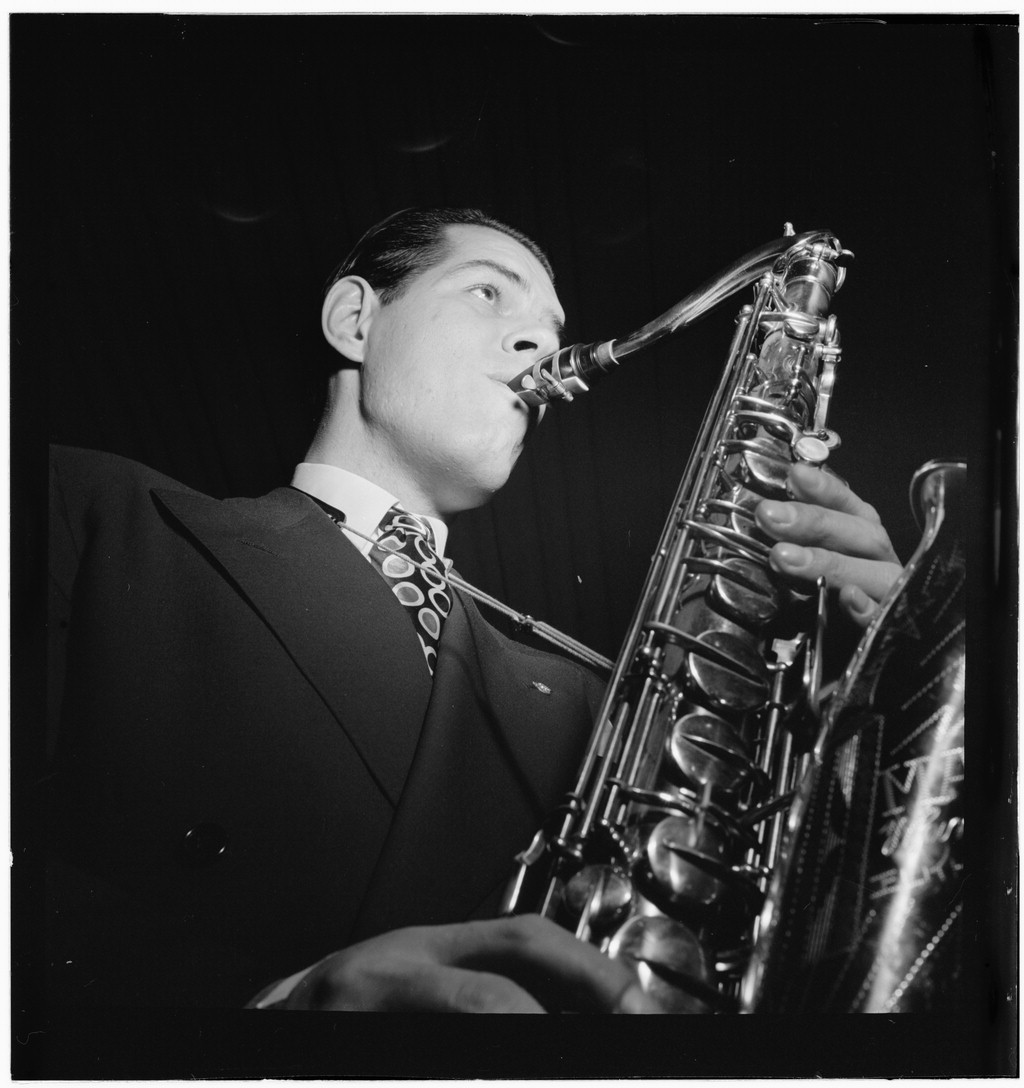
Tex Beneke played in Miller's second band for its entire four-year tenure, 1938–1942.

By March 1938, Miller had started rehearsing with a new lineup of musicians — lead trumpet Bob Price returned, joined by Johnny "Zulu" Austin and Gasparre Rebito; Miller's trombone section included Bob "Brad" Jenney and Al Mastren; lead alto Hal McIntyre was retained, with the rest of the saxophone section completed by Wilbur Schwartz, Sol Kane (both alto), Gordon "Tex" Beneke and Bernie "Josh" Billings (both tenor); and in the rhythm section, returning pianist Chummy MacGregor and bassist Rolly Bundock were joined by drummer Bob Spangler, and vocalists Ray Eberle and Gail Reese. Before the new band's first show in mid-April, Billings was replaced by Stan "Moose" Aronson.

In May, the band recorded its first new single, "Sold American". By July, Kane and Reese had been replaced by Bill Stegmeyer and Virginia Vonne, respectively. The following month, Rebito and Vonne were replaced by Lou Mucci and Linda Keene, respectively. Both new members were replaced within a month, by Bob Peck and Marion Hutton, while Paul Tanner came in for Jenny. The band recorded "My Reverie" and "By the Waters of Minnetonka" at the end of September 1938. During October, former saxophonist Tony Viola filled in for Schwartz on several occasions. Peck was replaced by Jack Kimble at the end of the month, followed by Claude Bowen around a month later. In mid-December, Legh Knowles, Claude Lakey and Cody Sandifer took over from Bowen, Stegmeyer and Spangler, respectively. Bowen returned after a week, replacing Austin.

At the end of January 1939, Al Klink and Charlie Hill replaced Lakey and Bowen, respectively (Austin returned for two days before Hill's arrival). This lineup recorded the orchestra's first singles of the year at the beginning of February: "(Gotta Get Some) Shut-Eye" and "Cuckoo in the Clock". At the end of the month, Lee Castaldo replaced Hill, before Dale "Mickey" McMickle took over a couple of weeks later. Sandifer left the band at the beginning of April — he was replaced for one show by Andy Picard, then for a recording session by stand-in Frank Carlson, and finally by a returning Maurice "Moe" Purtill. The next week, the band added Arthur Ens as its first guitarist in almost two years. Another week later, Joseph "Gabe" Gelinas joined the saxophone section in place of Aronson, who left for Will Osborne's band. This lineup recorded "Stairway to the Stars" in May.

Towards the end of May, long-term lead trumpet Bob Price left the band, with McMickle taking his place and Clyde Hurley joining. After another session spawning three singles, Ens was replaced by Dick Fisher at the start of June. A week later, Gelinas was replaced by Hal Tennyson. In the middle of the month, Knowles was temporarily replaced for a week by Johnny McGhee, during which time the band recorded "Oh, You Crazy Moon". Hutton was also absent for a week at the end of July, after collapsing onstage due to exhaustion, with 16-year-old Kay Starr filling in for the singer for a few shows and a session. Gerald Yelverton replaced Tennyson in mid-August, performing on the singles "My Isle of Golden Dreams" and "Blue Moonlight".

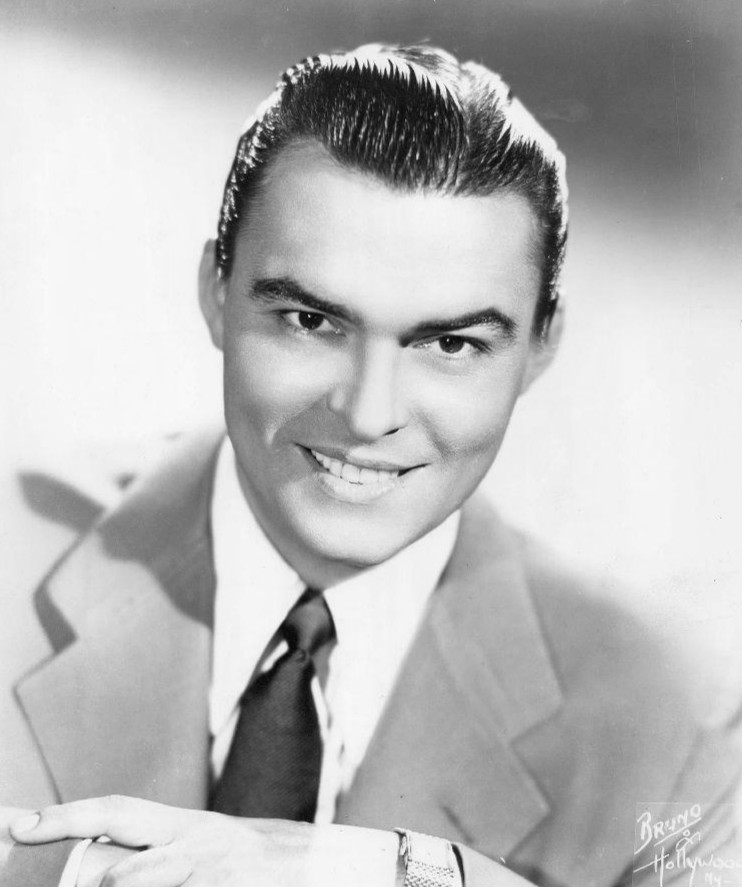
Ray Eberle was the main vocalist for Miller's band from March 1938 to July 1942.

==== 1939–1941: Expansion of the brass section ====
Towards the end of summer 1939, Miller planned to expand the brass section of his band from six performers to eight, complaining that "Three-part harmony sounds too thin". He first enlisted Johnny Best as his fourth trumpeter at the end of August, followed by promoting road manager Tommy Mack to part-time fourth trombonist at the start of September. After the first week of September, Yelverton was replaced by Jimmy Abato. As a temporary member initially, Mack did not feature at recording sessions during his first month, with Walter Barrow and Lloyd "Toby" Tyler filling in for the singles "Melancholy Lullaby" and "Out of Space", respectively. Mack featured at later sessions, before he was replaced by Frank D'Annolfo in early-November. The new lineup remained stable for over two months, recording a string of singles through January 1940.

In late-January 1940, long-term trombonist Al Mastren left due to "trouble with his arm". Mack filled in for a few days, before Howard Gibeling took over at the end of the month. After just a few days, however, Gibeling left again and Mack stepped back in. In the second week of February, Jimmy Priddy took over the role, and less than a week later, Ernie Caceres replaced Abato, who had left following months of tensions with Miller. This lineup remained in place for the next two months, before at the end of April the band saw Fisher replaced by Jack Lathrop and McMickle temporarily replaced by Rubin "Zeke" Zarchy, after McMickle got a cyst on his lip. When McMickle returned a couple of weeks later, Miller chose to retain Zarchy and dismiss Knowles. At the end of May, Hurley also left the trumpet section, replaced by Charles Frankhauser.

The band's lineup remained stable all through the summer, before long-time bassist Rolly Bundock left at the end of August to study at the Juilliard School. He was initially replaced by Tony Carlson, followed by Herman "Trigger" Alpert a couple of weeks later. In mid-October, Zarchy was replaced by Phil Rommel, who left after just over a week and was temporarily replaced by Max Kaminsky. A week later, Ray Anthony took over as Rommel's permanent replacement. Just a few days later, Frankhauser was also replaced by Billy May. In early-January 1941, singer Marion Hutton left Miller's band after nearly three years when she became pregnant, with Dorothy Claire taking her place. A few days later, vocal quartet The Modernaires also officially joined the orchestra. Claire only stayed until late-March, when she returned to Bobby Byrne's band and was replaced by Paula Kelly.

==== 1941–1942: The final year of the band ====
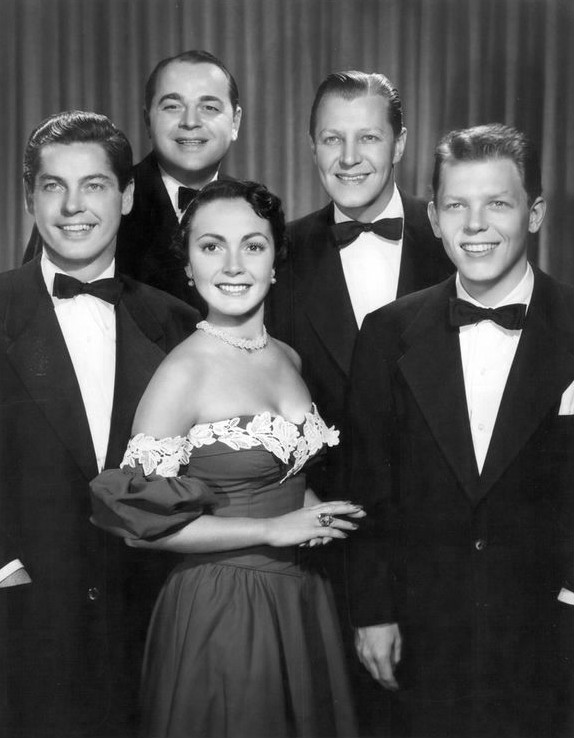
The Modernaires were official members of Miller's band starting in January 1941.

The lineup of Miller's band remained stable for the next two months, before Jack Lathrop left at the end of May, at which point Modernaires member Bill Conway took over on guitar. A few weeks later, Trigger Alpert was drafted and forced to leave the band; he enlisted Edward "Doc" Goldberg to take his place, although for two weeks Meyer "Mike" Rubin stood in as Goldberg was not yet available. At the same time as Goldberg's arrival in late-June, Warren Smith briefly filled in for Frank D'Annolfo for a few days, including a recording session. Early the next month, Ray Anthony was replaced by Alec Fila. Two days later, trumpeter Bobby Hackett also joined the band, replacing Conway on guitar. Shortly after a recording session in mid-August, Marion Hutton returned to the band (four months after giving birth), replacing her successor Paula Kelly.

In early-October, lead alto saxophonist Hal McIntyre — who had played with Miller constantly since 1937 — left to start his own band. He was replaced by Benny Feman for a few weeks, before Tex Beneke switched to lead alto at the end of the month and his place on tenor was taken by Irving "Babe" Russin. His tenure was similarly short, however, and within a few weeks Beneke was back on tenor after Russin left to form his own group, at which point Miller brought in Lloyd "Skip" Martin from Benny Goodman's band as his new lead alto player, sending Fila in return (Hackett switched to trumpet, with Conway taking over guitar again). For studio sessions in November and December, Hackett switched back to guitar and former member Zeke Zarchy took his place in the trumpet section. Bill Graham took over from Zarchy at a session in January.

Steve Lipkins joined as the permanent replacement for Alec Fila in late-January 1942. The band's lineup remained stable for the next six months, before long-time vocalist Ray Eberle left in July after a string of disagreements with Miller and reported issues with alcohol abuse. He was replaced by Skip Nelson, with whom the band recorded a string of singles later that month ahead of the 1942–1944 musicians' strike. In mid-September, shortly after Miller announced to his bandmates that he would be joining the U.S. Army in October, Lipkins moved to Jimmy Dorsey's band, with Hackett and Conway reverting to their former roles on trumpet and guitar, respectively. The band played its final show on September 27, 1942. Miller led a new band during his years in the army, before disappearing during a flight over the English Channel on December 15, 1944.

== Members ==
=== Official members ===
Image	Name	Years active	Instruments	Release contributions
	Glenn Miller (1904–1944)	1937–1938; 1938–1942	trombone; bandleader; occasional vocals	all Glenn Miller Orchestra releases
	Hal McIntyre (1914–1959)	1937–1938; 1938–1941	alto saxophone; clarinet	all from "Moonlight Bay" (1937) to "Dear Arabella" (1941); "Rhapsody in Blue" (1943)^{B}; "Here We Go Again" (1944)^{B}; "Basket Weaver" (1944); "Helpless" (1944)^{A}
	Jesse Ralph	1937–1938	trombone	all from "Moonlight Bay" (1937) to "Humoresque" (1938)
	Jerry "Buck" Jerome (1912–2001)	1937–1938	tenor saxophone	all from "Moonlight Bay" (1937) to "Humoresque" (1938)
	George Siravo (1916–2000)	1937	alto saxophone	all from "Moonlight Bay" (1937) to "Humoresque" (1938)
	Charlie Spivak (1904–1982)	1937	trumpet	all from "Moonlight Bay" (1937) to "Sleepy Time Gal" (1937)
	Sterling "Bozo" Bose (1906–1958)	1937	trumpet; vocals	"Moonlight Bay" (1937); "Anytime, Anyday, Anywhere" (1937); "Peg o' My Heart" (1937)
	Harry Rodgers	1937	trombone	"Moonlight Bay" (1937); "Anytime, Anyday, Anywhere" (1937); "Peg o' My Heart" (1937)
	Dick McDonough (1904–1938)	1937	guitar	"Moonlight Bay" (1937); "Anytime, Anyday, Anywhere" (1937); "Peg o' My Heart" (1937)
	Ted Kotsoftis	1937	bass	"Moonlight Bay" (1937); "Anytime, Anyday, Anywhere" (1937); "Peg o' My Heart" (1937)
	Mannie Klein (1908–1994)	1937	trumpet	"Moonlight Bay" (1937); "Anytime, Anyday, Anywhere" (1937); "Peg o' My Heart" (1937)
	Howard Smith (1910–unknown)	1937	piano	"Moonlight Bay" (1937); "Anytime, Anyday, Anywhere" (1937); "Peg o' My Heart" (1937)
	George T. Simon (1912–2001)	1937	drums	"Moonlight Bay" (1937); "Anytime, Anyday, Anywhere" (1937); "Peg o' My Heart" (1937)
	Johnny Harrell	1937	tenor saxophone	none
	Carl Biesecker	1937–1938	tenor saxophone	all from "Moonlight Bay" (1937) to "Humoresque" (1938)
	John "Chummy" MacGregor (1903–1973)	1937–1938; 1938–1942	piano	all from "I Got Rhythm" (1937) to "Helpless" (1944)
	Chuck "Tweet" Peterson (1915–1978)	1937	trumpet	all from "I Got Rhythm" (1938) to "Humoresque" (1938)
	Emery "Eak" Kenyon	1937	drums	"I Got Rhythm" (1937); "Sleepy Time Gal" (1937)
	Roland "Rolly" Bundock (1915–1998)	1937–1938; 1938–1940	bass	all from "I Got Rhythm" (1937) to "I Wouldn't Take a Million" (1940); "A Handful of Stars" (1940)^{A}; "Make Believe Ballroom Time" (1940)^{B}; "Frenesi" (1941)^{B}; "Basket Weaver" (1944)
	Cassius "Bud" Smith (1912–2003)	1937–1938	trombone	all from "I Got Rhythm" (1938) to "Humoresque" (1938)
	Ralph Capelli	1937	trumpet	"I Got Rhythm" (1937); "Sleepy Time Gal" (1937)
	Bill Peyser	1937	guitar	"I Got Rhythm" (1937); "Sleepy Time Gal" (1937)
	Jimmy Troutman	1937	trumpet	none
	Irving Fazola (1912–1949)	1937–1938	alto saxophone; clarinet	"My Fine Feathered Friend" (1938); "Every Day's a Holiday" (1938); "Humoresque" (1938)
	Bob Price	1937–1938; 1938–1939	trumpet	all from "My Fine Feathered Friend" (1938) to "Little Brown Jug" (1939)
	Adolph "Buddy" Schultz (1914–2007)	1937	drums	none
	Ennis "Doc" Carney	1937	drums	"My Fine Feathered Friend" (1938); "Every Day's a Holiday" (1938); "Humoresque" (1938)
	Ardell Garrett (1914–2005)	1937	trumpet	"My Fine Feathered Friend" (1938); "Every Day's a Holiday" (1938); "Humoresque" (1938)
	Tony Viola (1918–?)	1937–1938; 1938 (stand-in)	alto saxophone	none
	Tommy DiCarlo	1937–1938	trumpet	none
	Les Beigel (1908–2004)	1937–1938	trumpet	none
	Maurice "Moe" Purtill (1916–1994)	1937; 1939–1942	drums	all from "Sunrise Serenade" (1939)^{A} to "Helpless" (1944)
	Vic Angle	1937–1938	drums	none
	Wilbur Schwartz (1918–1990)	1938–1942	alto saxophone; clarinet	all from "Why'd Ya Make Me Fall in Love" (1938) to "Helpless" (1944)
	Gordon "Tex" Beneke (1914–2000)	1938–1942	tenor/alto (Note: Beneke primarily played tenor in Miller's band, but took over lead alto during October/November 1941 after Hal McIntyre's departure.) saxophones; additional vocals	all from "Why'd Ya Make Me Fall in Love" (1938) to "Helpless" (1944)
	Al Mastren (1914–2003)	1938–1940	trombone	all from "Why'd Ya Make Me Fall in Love" (1938) to "Missouri Waltz" (1940); "Polka Dots and Moonbeams" (1940)^{B}; "Basket Weaver" (1944)
	Johnny "Zulu" Austin (1910–1983)	1938; 1939	trumpet	"Why'd Ya Make Me Fall in Love" (1938); "Sold American" (1938); "My Reverie" (1938); "By the Waters of Minnetonka" (1938)
	Bob Spangler (c. 1912–1978)	1938	drums	"Why'd Ya Make Me Fall in Love" (1938); "Sold American" (1938); "My Reverie" (1938); "By the Waters of Minnetonka" (1938)
	Bob "Brad" Jenney (1913–1966)	1938	trombone	"Why'd Ya Make Me Fall in Love" (1938); "Sold American" (1938)
	Gasparre Rebito (1914–2004)	1938	trumpet	"Why'd Ya Make Me Fall in Love" (1938); "Sold American" (1938)
	Sol Kane	1938	alto saxophone	"Why'd Ya Make Me Fall in Love" (1938); "Sold American" (1938)
	Bernie "Josh" Billings (1914–1984)	1938	tenor and baritone saxophones	none
	Stan "Moose" Aronson (1916–2008)	1938–1939	tenor/alto (Note: Aronson played tenor alongside Tex Beneke from April 1938 to January 1939, before switching to alto when Al Klink joined the band.) and baritone saxophones	all from "Why'd Ya Make Me Fall in Love" (1938) to "Little Brown Jug" (1939), except "Stairway to the Stars" (1939)
	Bill Stegmeyer (1916–1968)	1938	alto saxophone; clarinet	"My Reverie" (1938); "By the Waters of Minnetonka" (1938)
	Lou Mucci (1909–2000)	1938	trumpet	none
	Paul Tanner (1917–2013)	1938–1942	trombone	all from "My Reverie" (1938) to "Helpless" (1944)
	Bob Peck	1938	trumpet	"My Reverie" (1938); "By the Waters of Minnetonka" (1938)
	Jack Kimble	1938	trumpet	none
	Claude Bowen (1914/1915–1954)	1938–1939	trumpet	none
	Legh Knowles (1919–1997)	1938–1940	trumpet	all from "(Gotta Get Some) Shut-Eye" (1939) to "Pennsylvania Six-Five Thousand" (1940), except "Oh, You Crazy Moon" (1939); "Frenesi" (1941)^{B}; "Basket Weaver" (1944)
	Cody Sandifer (1913–1989)	1938–1939	drums	"(Gotta Get Some) Shut-Eye" (1939); "Cuckoo in the Clock" (1939)
	Claude Lakey (1910–1990)	1938–1939	alto saxophone	none
	Al Klink (1915–1991)	1939–1942	tenor saxophone	all from "(Gotta Get Some) Shut-Eye" (1939) to "Helpless" (1944)
	Charlie Hill (c. 1910–unknown)	1939	trumpet	"(Gotta Get Some) Shut-Eye" (1939); "Cuckoo in the Clock" (1939)
	Lee Castaldo (1915–1990)	1939	trumpet	none
	Dale "Mickey" McMickle (1907–1985)	1939–1942	trumpet	all from "And the Angels Sing" (1939) to "Helpless" (1944), except "The Nearness of You" (1940)
	Arthur Ens	1939	guitar	all from "My Last Goodbye" (1939)^{A} to "Rendezvous Time in Paree" (1939), except "I'm Sorry for Myself" (1939)
	Joseph "Gabe" Gelinas (1910–1950)	1939	alto and baritone saxophones	all from "Stairway to the Stars" (1939) to "Guess I'll Go Back Home (This Summer)" (1939), except "Little Brown Jug" (1939)
	Clyde Hurley (1916–1963)	1939–1940	trumpet	all from "The Lamp Is Low" (1939) to "Pennsylvania Six-Five Thousand" (1940); "Frenesi" (1941)^{B}; "Basket Weaver" (1944)
	Dick Fisher	1939–1940	guitar	"I'm Sorry for Myself" (1939); all from "Guess I'll Go Back Home (This Summer)" (1939) to "Slow Freight" (1940)^{A}; "Pennsylvania Six-Five Thousand" (1940)^{B}; "Basket Weaver" (1944)
	Hal Tennyson (1916–2011)	1939	alto and baritone saxophones; clarinet	all from "Oh, You Crazy Moon" (1939) to "In the Mood" (1939), except "Blue Moonlight" (1939); "Indian Summer" (1939)^{B}; "In an Old Dutch Garden (By an Old Dutch Mill)" (1940)^{B}
	Gerald Yelverton (1916–2001)	1939	alto and baritone saxophones; clarinet	"My Isle of Golden Dreams" (1939)^{A}; "Blue Moonlight" (1939); "Blue Rain" (1939)^{B}; "Basket Weaver" (1944)^{A}
	Johnny Best (1913–2003)	1939–1942	trumpet	all from "Melancholy Lullaby" (1939) to "Helpless" (1944), except "Don't Cry, Cherie" (1941) and "Basket Weaver" (1944)
	Tommy Mack (c. 1912–unknown)	1939; 1940 (stand-in)	trombone	all from "Can I Help It?" (1939) to "It Was Written in the Stars" (1939); "Too Romantic" (1940); "Tuxedo Junction" (1940); "Imagination" (1940)^{B}; "The Rumba Jumps!" (1940)^{A}
	Jimmy Abato (1919–2008)	1939–1940	alto and baritone saxophones; clarinet	all from "Melancholy Lullaby" (1939) to "Imagination" (1940)^{B}; "Polka Dots and Moonbeams" (1940)^{B}; "Star Dust" (1940); "The Rumba Jumps!" (1940)^{A}; "Pennsylvania Six-Five Thousand" (1940)^{B}
	Frank D'Annolfo (1907–2003)	1939–1942	trombone	all from "Oh Johnny, Oh Johnny, Oh!" (1940) to "Helpless" (1944), except "Under Blue Canadian Skies" (1941) and "Basket Weaver" (1944)
	Howard Gibeling (1914–2003)	1940	trombone	"The Woodpecker Song" (1940); "Star Dust" (1940); "Pennsylvania Six-Five Thousand" (1940)^{B}
	Jimmy Priddy (1918–1990)	1940–1942	trombone	all from "Imagination" (1940)^{A} to "Helpless" (1944), except "Star Dust" (1940) and "Basket Weaver" (1944)
	Ernie Caceres (1911–1971)	1940–1942	alto and baritone saxophones; clarinet; vocals	all from "Imagination" (1940)^{A} to "Helpless" (1944), except "Star Dust" (1940) and "Basket Weaver" (1944)
	Jack Lathrop (1913–1987)	1940–1941	guitar; vocals	all from "Slow Freight" (1940)^{B} to "Don't Cry, Cherie" (1941); "Peekaboo to You" (1941)^{B}; "I Know Why" (1941); "The Cowboy Serenade (While I'm Rollin' My Last Cigarette)" (1941)^{B}; "Here We Go Again" (1944)^{B}; "Helpless" (1944)^{A}
	Rubin "Zeke" Zarchy (1915–2009)	1940; 1941 (session)	trumpet	all from "Slow Freight" (1940)^{B} to "A Nightingale Sang in Berkeley Square" (1940); "Frenesi" (1941)^{B}; "You Stepped Out of a Dream" (1941)^{B}; all from "Moonlight Sonata" (1941) to "The Story of a Starry Night" (1942)^{A}, except "When the Roses Bloom Again" (1942); "On the Old Assembly Line" (1942)^{A}
	Charles Frankhauser	1940	trumpet	all from "Blueberry Hill" (1940) to "A Nightingale Sang in Berkeley Square" (1940); "You Stepped Out of a Dream" (1941)^{B}
	Tony Carlson (1918–1986)	1940	bass	"Beat Me Daddy, Eight to a Bar" (1940); "A Handful of Stars" (1940)^{B}; "Shadows on the Sand" (1940); "A Nightingale Sang in Berkeley Square" (1940)^{B}; "You Stepped Out of a Dream" (1941)^{B}
	Herman "Trigger" Alpert (1916–2013)	1940–1941	bass	all from "I'd Know You Anywhere" (1940) to "The Cowboy Serenade (While I'm Rollin' My Last Cigarette)" (1941)^{B}, except "Under Blue Canadian Skies" (1942); "Here We Go Again" (1944)^{B}; "Helpless" (1944)^{A}
	Phil Rommel (1913–1999)	1940	trumpet	none
	Ray Anthony (born 1922)	1940–1941	trumpet	all from "Do You Know Why" (1941) to "The Cowboy Serenade (While I'm Rollin' My Last Cigarette)" (1941); "Here We Go Again" (1944)^{B}; "Helpless" (1944)^{A}
	Billy May (1916–2004)	1940–1942	trumpet	all from "Do You Know Why" (1941) to "Helpless" (1944), except "Basket Weaver" (1944)
	Edward "Doc" Goldberg (1913–1988)	1941–1942	bass	all from "You and I" (1941)^{A} to "Here We Go Again" (1944)^{A}, except "I Know Why" (1941)
	Alec Fila (1921–2001)	1941	trumpet	all from "It Happened in Sun Valley" (1941) to "Day Dreaming" (1941); "Conchita Marquita Lolita Pepita Rosita Juanita Lopez" (1942)^{B}
	Bobby Hackett (1915–1976)	1941–1942	guitar; trumpet (Note: Hackett initially joined the band on guitar, later taking over trumpet when Alec Fila left. He continued to play guitar in the studio.)	all from "It Happened in Sun Valley" (1941) to "Here We Go Again" (1944)^{A}, except "Moonlight Cocktail" (1941)
	Benny Feman (1916–2005)	1941	alto saxophone	"Dreamsville, Ohio" (1941); "Jingle Bells" (1941); "Humpty Dumpty Heart" (1941)^{B}
	Irving "Babe" Russin (1911–1984)	1941	tenor saxophone	"Ev'rything I Love" (1941); "Humpty Dumpty Heart" (1941)^{A}; "Day Dreaming" (1941); "Conchita Marquita Lolita Pepita Rosita Juanita Lopez" (1942)^{B}
	Lloyd "Skip" Martin (1916–1976)	1941–1942	alto saxophone	all from "Moonlight Sonata" (1941) to "Here We Go Again" (1944)^{A}
	Steve Lipkins (1917–2011)	1942	trumpet	all from "The Lamplighter's Serenade" (1942) to "Here We Go Again" (1944)^{A}

=== Featured vocalists ===
Image	Name	Years active	Details
	Violet "Vi" Mele	1937	Mele was Miller's band's first featured vocalist, performing with the group during mid to late-May 1937.
	Kathleen Lane (1916–unknown)	1937–1938	Lane replaced Mele in June 1937 and remained with Miller's band until its initial breakup in January 1938. During her tenure, she recorded the singles "My Fine Feathered Friend" and "Every Day's a Holiday", and the "Humoresque" B-side "Doin' the Jive".
	Ray Eberle (1919–1979)	1938–1942	Miller brought in Eberle as his first full-time male singer when he reformed his band in March 1938. He performed on numerous recordings with the orchestra and remained a member until July 1942, when he was dismissed due to "many acts of misconduct", according to Miller.
	Gail Reese (1917–1998)	1938	Reese joined at the same time as Eberle, performing on "Why'd Ya Make Me Fall in Love" before leaving just a few months later.
	Virginia Vonne	1938	Vonne had a short-lived spell in the Glenn Miller Orchestra during the summer of 1938, but did not contribute to any recordings.
	Linda Keene (1911–1981)	1938	Keene replaced Vonne and performed a few shows with Miller's band, but left after a similarly short tenure around August 1938.
	Marion Hutton (1919–1987)	1938–1941; 1941–1942	Hutton replaced Keene as Miller's female vocalist during September 1938. She remained until January 1941, when she left after becoming pregnant. Seven months later, she returned to the band, remaining until its disbandment in September 1942.
	Dorothy Claire (1920–1982)	1941	Claire replaced Hutton and stayed with Miller's band for two months, performing on "Perfidia" during her tenure.
	Ralph Brewster (1914–1990)	1940 (session); 1941–1942	A few days after Claire replaced Hutton in January 1941, Miller also added The Modernaires (Brewster, Conway, Dickinson and Goldstein) as official members of his band. They had previously performed at a recording session in October 1940. During their tenure with the band, Brewster also briefly doubled on trumpet, while Conway doubled on guitar from May 1941.
	Bill Conway (1913–1991)	1940 (session); 1941–1942	A few days after Claire replaced Hutton in January 1941, Miller also added The Modernaires (Brewster, Conway, Dickinson and Goldstein) as official members of his band. They had previously performed at a recording session in October 1940. During their tenure with the band, Brewster also briefly doubled on trumpet, while Conway doubled on guitar from May 1941.
	Hal Dickinson (1913–1970)	1940 (session); 1941–1942	A few days after Claire replaced Hutton in January 1941, Miller also added The Modernaires (Brewster, Conway, Dickinson and Goldstein) as official members of his band. They had previously performed at a recording session in October 1940. During their tenure with the band, Brewster also briefly doubled on trumpet, while Conway doubled on guitar from May 1941.
	Chuck Goldstein (1914–1974)	1940 (session); 1941–1942	A few days after Claire replaced Hutton in January 1941, Miller also added The Modernaires (Brewster, Conway, Dickinson and Goldstein) as official members of his band. They had previously performed at a recording session in October 1940. During their tenure with the band, Brewster also briefly doubled on trumpet, while Conway doubled on guitar from May 1941.
	Paula Kelly (1919–1992)	1941	Kelly took over from Claire as Miller's female vocalist and remained until August 1941, when Marion Hutton returned.
	Skip Nelson (1920–1974)	1942	Nelson took over as Miller's main featured singer after Ray Eberle's departure from July to September 1942.

=== Stand-in members ===
Image	Name	Years active	Instruments	Details
	Andy Picard	1939	drums	Picard stood in for one show at the beginning of April 1939 after Cody Sandifer's departure.
	Johnny McGhee (1905–1978)	1939	trumpet	McGhee filled in for Legh Knowles during the week of June 18–25, 1939. He is featured on both songs recorded at the one session during that period: "Oh, You Crazy Moon" and B-side "Ain't Cha Comin' Out?"
	Kay Starr (1922–2016)	1939	vocals	Starr filled in for Marion Hutton in late-July 1939 after the vocalist collapsed onstage. During her tenure, she appeared at one recording session, performing on the B-sides "Baby Me" and "Love with a Capital "You"".
	Max Kaminsky (1908–1994)	1940	trumpet	Kaminsky filled in on trumpet for a week, following Phil Rommel's departure after a tenure of just ten days.
	Meyer "Mike" Rubin (1912–2001)	1941	bass	Rubin stood in on bass for a couple of weeks after Trigger Alpert left, whilst Doc Goldberg was unavailable.

=== Session musicians ===
Image	Name	Years active	Instruments	Details
	Doris Kerr	1937	vocals	Kerr and the Tune Twisters worked with Miller's band at their first recording session in March 1937. Kerr is featured on "Wistful and Blue" and "How Am I to Know?"; the Tune Twisters on "Anytime, Anyday, Anywhere".
	Tune Twisters	1937	vocals	Kerr and the Tune Twisters worked with Miller's band at their first recording session in March 1937. Kerr is featured on "Wistful and Blue" and "How Am I to Know?"; the Tune Twisters on "Anytime, Anyday, Anywhere".
	Allan Reuss (1915–1988)	1939	guitar	Reuss performed at three sessions, in February and April 1939, appearing on the singles "(Gotta Get Some) Shut-Eye", "Cuckoo in the Clock", "And the Angels Sing", "Sunrise Serenade", "Three Little Fishies" and "My Last Goodbye".
	Frank Carlson (1914–1996)	1939	drums	After Cody Sandifer's departure on April 2, 1939, Carlson stood in for a session on April 4, recording "And the Angels Sing" (and B-side "The Chestnut Tree"), "Moonlight Serenade" and "The Lady's in Love with You".
	Walter Barrow	1939	trombone	During the first month of Tommy Mack's tenure in the band, he did not perform at recording sessions; he was replaced by Barrow (for "Melancholy Lullaby") and Tyler (for "Out of Space") on September 11 and 25, 1939, respectively.
	Lloyd "Toby" Tyler (1910/1911–1993)	1939	trombone	During the first month of Tommy Mack's tenure in the band, he did not perform at recording sessions; he was replaced by Barrow (for "Melancholy Lullaby") and Tyler (for "Out of Space") on September 11 and 25, 1939, respectively.

== Lineups ==
Period	Members			Recordings
Period	Brass section	Woodwind section	Rhythm section	Recordings
March 1937	Glenn Miller — trombone; Jesse Ralph — trombone; Harry Rodgers — trombone; Charlie Spivak — trumpet; Sterling Bose — trumpet; Mannie Klein — trumpet	George Siravo — alto sax; Hal McIntyre — alto sax, clarinet; Jerry Jerome — tenor sax; Carl Biesecker — tenor sax	Howard Smith — piano; Dick McDonough — guitar; Ted Kotsoftis — bass; George T. Simon — drums; Doris Kerr — vocals (session); Tune Twisters — vocals (session)	"Moonlight Bay" (1937); "Anytime, Anyday, Anywhere" (1937); "Peg o' My Heart" (1937)
May 1937	Glenn Miller — trombone; Jesse Ralph — trombone; Harry Rodgers — trombone; Charlie Spivak — trumpet; Sterling Bose — trumpet; Tweet Peterson — trumpet	George Siravo — alto sax; Hal McIntyre — alto sax, clarinet; Jerry Jerome — tenor sax; Carl Biesecker — tenor sax	Chummy MacGregor — piano; Dick McDonough — guitar; Ted Kotsoftis — bass; Eak Kenyon — drums; Vi Mele — vocals	none
Early June 1937	Glenn Miller — trombone; Jesse Ralph — trombone; Bud Smith — trombone; Charlie Spivak — trumpet; Tweet Peterson — trumpet; Ralph Capelli — trumpet	George Siravo — alto sax; Hal McIntyre — alto sax, clarinet; Jerry Jerome — tenor sax; Carl Biesecker — tenor sax	Chummy MacGregor — piano; Bill Peyser — guitar; Rolly Bundock — bass; Eak Kenyon — drums; Vi Mele — vocals	"I Got Rhythm" (1937); "Sleepy Time Gal" (1937)
June–August 1937	Glenn Miller — trombone; Jesse Ralph — trombone; Bud Smith — trombone; Tweet Peterson — trumpet; Ralph Capelli — trumpet; Jimmy Troutman — trumpet	George Siravo — alto sax; Hal McIntyre — alto sax, clarinet; Jerry Jerome — tenor sax; Carl Biesecker — tenor sax	Chummy MacGregor — piano; Bill Peyser — guitar; Rolly Bundock — bass; Eak Kenyon — drums; Kathleen Lane — vocals	none
Mid–late August 1937	Glenn Miller — trombone; Jesse Ralph — trombone; Bud Smith — trombone; Tweet Peterson — trumpet; Ralph Capelli — trumpet; Jimmy Troutman — trumpet	George Siravo — alto sax; Hal McIntyre — alto sax, clarinet; Irving Fazola — alto sax, clarinet; Jerry Jerome — tenor sax; Carl Biesecker — tenor sax	Chummy MacGregor — piano; Rolly Bundock — bass; Eak Kenyon — drums; Kathleen Lane — vocals	none
August–September 1937	Glenn Miller — trombone; Jesse Ralph — trombone; Bud Smith — trombone; Tweet Peterson — trumpet; Jimmy Troutman — trumpet; Bob Price — trumpet	George Siravo — alto sax; Hal McIntyre — alto sax, clarinet; Irving Fazola — alto sax, clarinet; Jerry Jerome — tenor sax; Carl Biesecker — tenor sax	Chummy MacGregor — piano; Rolly Bundock — bass; Eak Kenyon — drums; Kathleen Lane — vocals	none
September–October 1937	Glenn Miller — trombone; Jesse Ralph — trombone; Bud Smith — trombone; Tweet Peterson — trumpet; Jimmy Troutman — trumpet; Bob Price — trumpet	George Siravo — alto sax; Hal McIntyre — alto sax, clarinet; Irving Fazola — alto sax, clarinet; Jerry Jerome — tenor sax; Carl Biesecker — tenor sax	Chummy MacGregor — piano; Rolly Bundock — bass; Buddy Schultz — drums; Kathleen Lane — vocals	none
October–December 1937	Glenn Miller — trombone; Jesse Ralph — trombone; Bud Smith — trombone; Tweet Peterson — trumpet; Bob Price — trumpet; Ardell Garrett — trumpet	George Siravo — alto sax; Hal McIntyre — alto sax, clarinet; Irving Fazola — alto sax, clarinet; Jerry Jerome — tenor sax; Carl Biesecker — tenor sax	Chummy MacGregor — piano; Rolly Bundock — bass; Doc Carney — drums; Kathleen Lane — vocals	"My Fine Feathered Friend" (1938); "Every Day's a Holiday" (1938); "Humoresque" (1938)
Mid December 1937	Glenn Miller — trombone; Jesse Ralph — trombone; Bud Smith — trombone; Tweet Peterson — trumpet; Bob Price — trumpet; Tommy DiCarlo — trumpet	Hal McIntyre — alto sax, clarinet; Irving Fazola — alto sax, clarinet; Tony Viola — alto sax; Jerry Jerome — tenor sax; Carl Biesecker — tenor sax	Chummy MacGregor — piano; Rolly Bundock — bass; Doc Carney — drums; Kathleen Lane — vocals	none
Mid–late December 1937	Glenn Miller — trombone; Jesse Ralph — trombone; Bud Smith — trombone; Bob Price — trumpet; Tommy DiCarlo — trumpet; Les Beigel — trumpet	Hal McIntyre — alto sax, clarinet; Irving Fazola — alto sax, clarinet; Tony Viola — alto sax; Jerry Jerome — tenor sax; Carl Biesecker — tenor sax	Chummy MacGregor — piano; Rolly Bundock — bass; Doc Carney — drums; Kathleen Lane — vocals	none
December 25, 1937	Glenn Miller — trombone; Jesse Ralph — trombone; Bud Smith — trombone; Bob Price — trumpet; Tommy DiCarlo — trumpet; Les Beigel — trumpet	Hal McIntyre — alto sax, clarinet; Irving Fazola — alto sax, clarinet; Tony Viola — alto sax; Jerry Jerome — tenor sax; Carl Biesecker — tenor sax	Chummy MacGregor — piano; Rolly Bundock — bass; Maurice Purtill — drums; Kathleen Lane — vocals	none
December 1937–January 1938	Glenn Miller — trombone; Jesse Ralph — trombone; Bud Smith — trombone; Bob Price — trumpet; Tommy DiCarlo — trumpet; Les Beigel — trumpet	Hal McIntyre — alto sax, clarinet; Irving Fazola — alto sax, clarinet; Tony Viola — alto sax; Jerry Jerome — tenor sax; Carl Biesecker — tenor sax	Chummy MacGregor — piano; Rolly Bundock — bass; Vic Angle — drums; Kathleen Lane — vocals	none
Band inactive January–March 1938
March–April 1938	Glenn Miller — trombone; Al Mastren — trombone; Brad Jenney — trombone; Bob Price — trumpet; Johnny Austin — trumpet; Gasparre Rebito — trumpet	Hal McIntyre — alto sax, clarinet; Wilbur Schwartz — alto sax, clarinet; Sol Kane — alto sax; Tex Beneke — tenor sax; Josh Billings — tenor sax	Chummy MacGregor — piano; Rolly Bundock — bass; Bob Spangler — drums; Ray Eberle — vocals; Gail Reese — vocals	none
April–June 1938	Glenn Miller — trombone; Al Mastren — trombone; Brad Jenney — trombone; Bob Price — trumpet; Johnny Austin — trumpet; Gasparre Rebito — trumpet	Hal McIntyre — alto sax, clarinet; Wilbur Schwartz — alto sax, clarinet; Sol Kane — alto sax; Tex Beneke — tenor sax; Stan Aronson — tenor sax	Chummy MacGregor — piano; Rolly Bundock — bass; Bob Spangler — drums; Ray Eberle — vocals; Gail Reese — vocals	"Why'd Ya Make Me Fall in Love" (1938); "Sold American" (1938)
July–August 1938	Glenn Miller — trombone; Al Mastren — trombone; Brad Jenney — trombone; Bob Price — trumpet; Johnny Austin — trumpet; Gasparre Rebito — trumpet	Hal McIntyre — alto sax, clarinet; Wilbur Schwartz — alto sax, clarinet; Bill Stegmeyer — alto sax; Tex Beneke — tenor sax; Stan Aronson — tenor sax	Chummy MacGregor — piano; Rolly Bundock — bass; Bob Spangler — drums; Ray Eberle — vocals; Virginia Vonne — vocals	none
August–September 1938	Glenn Miller — trombone; Al Mastren — trombone; Brad Jenney — trombone; Bob Price — trumpet; Johnny Austin — trumpet; Lou Mucci — trumpet	Hal McIntyre — alto sax, clarinet; Wilbur Schwartz — alto sax, clarinet; Bill Stegmeyer — alto sax; Tex Beneke — tenor sax; Stan Aronson — tenor sax	Chummy MacGregor — piano; Rolly Bundock — bass; Bob Spangler — drums; Ray Eberle — vocals; Linda Keene — vocals	none
September–October 1938	Glenn Miller — trombone; Al Mastren — trombone; Paul Tanner — trombone; Bob Price — trumpet; Johnny Austin — trumpet; Bob Peck — trumpet	Hal McIntyre — alto sax, clarinet; Wilbur Schwartz — alto sax, clarinet; Bill Stegmeyer — alto sax; Tex Beneke — tenor sax; Stan Aronson — tenor sax	Chummy MacGregor — piano; Rolly Bundock — bass; Bob Spangler — drums; Ray Eberle — vocals; Marion Hutton — vocals	"My Reverie" (1938); "By the Waters of Minnetonka" (1938)
October–November, 1938	Glenn Miller — trombone; Al Mastren — trombone; Paul Tanner — trombone; Bob Price — trumpet; Johnny Austin — trumpet; Jack Kimble — trumpet	Hal McIntyre — alto sax, clarinet; Wilbur Schwartz — alto sax, clarinet; Bill Stegmeyer — alto sax; Tex Beneke — tenor sax; Stan Aronson — tenor sax	Chummy MacGregor — piano; Rolly Bundock — bass; Bob Spangler — drums; Ray Eberle — vocals; Marion Hutton — vocals	none
November–December 1938	Glenn Miller — trombone; Al Mastren — trombone; Paul Tanner — trombone; Bob Price — trumpet; Johnny Austin — trumpet; Claude Bowen — trumpet	Hal McIntyre — alto sax, clarinet; Wilbur Schwartz — alto sax, clarinet; Bill Stegmeyer — alto sax; Tex Beneke — tenor sax; Stan Aronson — tenor sax	Chummy MacGregor — piano; Rolly Bundock — bass; Bob Spangler — drums; Ray Eberle — vocals; Marion Hutton — vocals	none
December 11–17, 1938	Glenn Miller — trombone; Al Mastren — trombone; Paul Tanner — trombone; Bob Price — trumpet; Johnny Austin — trumpet; Legh Knowles — trumpet	Hal McIntyre — alto sax, clarinet; Wilbur Schwartz — alto sax, clarinet; Claude Lakey — alto sax; Tex Beneke — tenor sax; Stan Aronson — tenor sax	Chummy MacGregor — piano; Rolly Bundock — bass; Cody Sandifer — drums; Ray Eberle — vocals; Marion Hutton — vocals	none
December 1938–January 1939	Glenn Miller — trombone; Al Mastren — trombone; Paul Tanner — trombone; Bob Price — trumpet; Legh Knowles — trumpet; Claude Bowen — trumpet	Hal McIntyre — alto sax, clarinet; Wilbur Schwartz — alto sax, clarinet; Claude Lakey — alto sax; Tex Beneke — tenor sax; Stan Aronson — tenor sax	Chummy MacGregor — piano; Rolly Bundock — bass; Cody Sandifer — drums; Ray Eberle — vocals; Marion Hutton — vocals	none
January 25–26, 1939	Glenn Miller — trombone; Al Mastren — trombone; Paul Tanner — trombone; Bob Price — trumpet; Legh Knowles — trumpet; Johnny Austin — trumpet	Hal McIntyre — alto sax, clarinet; Wilbur Schwartz — alto sax, clarinet; Stan Aronson — alto sax; Tex Beneke — tenor sax; Al Klink — tenor sax	Chummy MacGregor — piano; Rolly Bundock — bass; Cody Sandifer — drums; Ray Eberle — vocals; Marion Hutton — vocals	none
January–February 1939	Glenn Miller — trombone; Al Mastren — trombone; Paul Tanner — trombone; Bob Price — trumpet; Legh Knowles — trumpet; Charlie Hill — trumpet	Hal McIntyre — alto sax, clarinet; Wilbur Schwartz — alto sax, clarinet; Stan Aronson — alto sax; Tex Beneke — tenor sax; Al Klink — tenor sax	Chummy MacGregor — piano; Allan Reuss — guitar (session); Rolly Bundock — bass; Cody Sandifer — drums; Ray Eberle — vocals; Marion Hutton — vocals	"(Gotta Get Some) Shut-Eye" (1939); "Cuckoo in the Clock" (1939)
February–March 1939	Glenn Miller — trombone; Al Mastren — trombone; Paul Tanner — trombone; Bob Price — trumpet; Legh Knowles — trumpet; Lee Castaldo — trumpet	Hal McIntyre — alto sax, clarinet; Wilbur Schwartz — alto sax, clarinet; Stan Aronson — alto sax; Tex Beneke — tenor sax; Al Klink — tenor sax	Chummy MacGregor — piano; Rolly Bundock — bass; Cody Sandifer — drums; Ray Eberle — vocals; Marion Hutton — vocals	none
March–April 1939	Glenn Miller — trombone; Al Mastren — trombone; Paul Tanner — trombone; Bob Price — trumpet; Legh Knowles — trumpet; Mickey McMickle — trumpet	Hal McIntyre — alto sax, clarinet; Wilbur Schwartz — alto sax, clarinet; Stan Aronson — alto sax; Tex Beneke — tenor sax; Al Klink — tenor sax	Chummy MacGregor — piano; Rolly Bundock — bass; Cody Sandifer — drums; Ray Eberle — vocals; Marion Hutton — vocals	none
April 3, 1939	Glenn Miller — trombone; Al Mastren — trombone; Paul Tanner — trombone; Bob Price — trumpet; Legh Knowles — trumpet; Mickey McMickle — trumpet	Hal McIntyre — alto sax, clarinet; Wilbur Schwartz — alto sax, clarinet; Stan Aronson — alto sax; Tex Beneke — tenor sax; Al Klink — tenor sax	Chummy MacGregor — piano; Rolly Bundock — bass; Andy Picard — drums (stand-in); Ray Eberle — vocals; Marion Hutton — vocals	none
April 4, 1939	Glenn Miller — trombone; Al Mastren — trombone; Paul Tanner — trombone; Bob Price — trumpet; Legh Knowles — trumpet; Mickey McMickle — trumpet	Hal McIntyre — alto sax, clarinet; Wilbur Schwartz — alto sax, clarinet; Stan Aronson — alto sax; Tex Beneke — tenor sax; Al Klink — tenor sax	Chummy MacGregor — piano; Allan Reuss — guitar (session); Rolly Bundock — bass; Frank Carlson — drums (session); Ray Eberle — vocals; Marion Hutton — vocals	"And the Angels Sing" (1939); "Sunrise Serenade" (1939)^{B}; "My Last Goodbye" (1939)^{B}
April 6–13, 1939	Glenn Miller — trombone; Al Mastren — trombone; Paul Tanner — trombone; Bob Price — trumpet; Legh Knowles — trumpet; Mickey McMickle — trumpet	Hal McIntyre — alto sax, clarinet; Wilbur Schwartz — alto sax, clarinet; Stan Aronson — alto sax; Tex Beneke — tenor sax; Al Klink — tenor sax	Chummy MacGregor — piano; Allan Reuss — guitar (session); Rolly Bundock — bass; Maurice Purtill — drums; Ray Eberle — vocals; Marion Hutton — vocals	"Sunrise Serenade" (1939)^{A}; "Three Little Fishies" (1939); "Little Brown Jug" (1939)^{A}
April 14–21, 1939	Glenn Miller — trombone; Al Mastren — trombone; Paul Tanner — trombone; Bob Price — trumpet; Legh Knowles — trumpet; Mickey McMickle — trumpet	Hal McIntyre — alto sax, clarinet; Wilbur Schwartz — alto sax, clarinet; Stan Aronson — alto sax; Tex Beneke — tenor sax; Al Klink — tenor sax	Chummy MacGregor — piano; Arthur Ens — guitar; Rolly Bundock — bass; Maurice Purtill — drums; Ray Eberle — vocals; Marion Hutton — vocals	"My Last Goodbye" (1939)^{A}; "But It Didn't Mean a Thing" (1939); "Little Brown Jug" (1939)^{B}
April 22–May 18, 1939	Glenn Miller — trombone; Al Mastren — trombone; Paul Tanner — trombone; Bob Price — trumpet; Legh Knowles — trumpet; Mickey McMickle — trumpet	Hal McIntyre — alto sax, clarinet; Wilbur Schwartz — alto sax, clarinet; Gabe Gelinas — alto sax; Tex Beneke — tenor sax; Al Klink — tenor sax	Chummy MacGregor — piano; Arthur Ens — guitar; Rolly Bundock — bass; Maurice Purtill — drums; Ray Eberle — vocals; Marion Hutton — vocals	"Stairway to the Stars" (1939)
May 19–June 1, 1939	Glenn Miller — trombone; Al Mastren — trombone; Paul Tanner — trombone; Legh Knowles — trumpet; Mickey McMickle — trumpet; Clyde Hurley — trumpet	Hal McIntyre — alto sax, clarinet; Wilbur Schwartz — alto sax, clarinet; Gabe Gelinas — alto sax; Tex Beneke — tenor sax; Al Klink — tenor sax	Chummy MacGregor — piano; Arthur Ens — guitar; Rolly Bundock — bass; Maurice Purtill — drums; Ray Eberle — vocals; Marion Hutton — vocals	"The Lamp Is Low" (1939); "Cinderella (Stay in My Arms)" (1939); "Rendezvous Time in Paree" (1939)
June 2–8, 1939	Glenn Miller — trombone; Al Mastren — trombone; Paul Tanner — trombone; Legh Knowles — trumpet; Mickey McMickle — trumpet; Clyde Hurley — trumpet	Hal McIntyre — alto sax, clarinet; Wilbur Schwartz — alto sax, clarinet; Gabe Gelinas — alto sax; Tex Beneke — tenor sax; Al Klink — tenor sax	Chummy MacGregor — piano; Dick Fisher — guitar; Rolly Bundock — bass; Maurice Purtill — drums; Ray Eberle — vocals; Marion Hutton — vocals	"I'm Sorry for Myself" (1939); "Guess I'll Go Back Home (This Summer)" (1939)
June 9–25, 1939	Glenn Miller — trombone; Al Mastren — trombone; Paul Tanner — trombone; Legh Knowles — trumpet; Mickey McMickle — trumpet; Clyde Hurley — trumpet	Hal McIntyre — alto sax, clarinet; Wilbur Schwartz — alto sax, clarinet; Hal Tennyson — alto sax, clarinet; Tex Beneke — tenor sax; Al Klink — tenor sax	Chummy MacGregor — piano; Dick Fisher — guitar; Rolly Bundock — bass; Maurice Purtill — drums; Ray Eberle — vocals; Marion Hutton — vocals	none
June 9–25, 1939	Johnny McGhee — trumpet (stand-in for Knowles from June 18–25)	Hal McIntyre — alto sax, clarinet; Wilbur Schwartz — alto sax, clarinet; Hal Tennyson — alto sax, clarinet; Tex Beneke — tenor sax; Al Klink — tenor sax	Chummy MacGregor — piano; Dick Fisher — guitar; Rolly Bundock — bass; Maurice Purtill — drums; Ray Eberle — vocals; Marion Hutton — vocals	"Oh, You Crazy Moon" (1939)
June 26–August 10, 1939	Glenn Miller — trombone; Al Mastren — trombone; Paul Tanner — trombone; Legh Knowles — trumpet; Mickey McMickle — trumpet; Clyde Hurley — trumpet	Hal McIntyre — alto sax, clarinet; Wilbur Schwartz — alto sax, clarinet; Hal Tennyson — alto sax, clarinet; Tex Beneke — tenor sax; Al Klink — tenor sax	Chummy MacGregor — piano; Dick Fisher — guitar; Rolly Bundock — bass; Maurice Purtill — drums; Ray Eberle — vocals; Marion Hutton — vocals	"Wanna Hat with Cherries" (1939); "Sold American" (1939); "The Man with the Mandolin" (1939); "Over the Rainbow" (1939); "An Angel in a Furnished Room" (1939)^{A}; "Twilight Interlude" (1939)^{A}; "My Isle of Golden Dreams" (1939)^{B}; "In the Mood" (1939); "Indian Summer" (1939)^{B}
June 26–August 10, 1939	Glenn Miller — trombone; Al Mastren — trombone; Paul Tanner — trombone; Legh Knowles — trumpet; Mickey McMickle — trumpet; Clyde Hurley — trumpet	Hal McIntyre — alto sax, clarinet; Wilbur Schwartz — alto sax, clarinet; Hal Tennyson — alto sax, clarinet; Tex Beneke — tenor sax; Al Klink — tenor sax	Kay Starr — vocals (stand-in for Hutton from July 23–31)	"Blue Orchids" (1939); "An Angel in a Furnished Room" (1939)^{B}; "Twilight Interlude" (1939)^{B}; "In an Old Dutch Garden (By an Old Dutch Mill)" (1940)^{B}
August 11–26, 1939	Glenn Miller — trombone; Al Mastren — trombone; Paul Tanner — trombone; Mickey McMickle — trumpet; Clyde Hurley — trumpet; Legh Knowles — trumpet	Hal McIntyre — alto sax, clarinet; Wilbur Schwartz — alto sax, clarinet; Gerald Yelverton — alto sax, clarinet; Tex Beneke — tenor sax; Al Klink — tenor sax	Chummy MacGregor — piano; Dick Fisher — guitar; Rolly Bundock — bass; Maurice Purtill — drums; Ray Eberle — vocals; Marion Hutton — vocals	"My Isle of Golden Dreams" (1939)^{A}; "Blue Moonlight" (1939); "Blue Rain" (1939)^{B}; "Basket Weaver" (1944)^{A}
August 27–31, 1939	Glenn Miller — trombone; Al Mastren — trombone; Paul Tanner — trombone; Mickey McMickle — trumpet; Clyde Hurley — trumpet; Legh Knowles — trumpet; Johnny Best — trumpet	Hal McIntyre — alto sax, clarinet; Wilbur Schwartz — alto sax, clarinet; Gerald Yelverton — alto sax, clarinet; Tex Beneke — tenor sax; Al Klink — tenor sax	Chummy MacGregor — piano; Dick Fisher — guitar; Rolly Bundock — bass; Maurice Purtill — drums; Ray Eberle — vocals; Marion Hutton — vocals	none
September 1–7, 1939	Glenn Miller — trombone; Al Mastren — trombone; Paul Tanner — trombone; Tommy Mack — trombone (stand-in); Mickey McMickle — trumpet; Clyde Hurley — trumpet; Legh Knowles — trumpet; Johnny Best — trumpet	Hal McIntyre — alto sax, clarinet; Wilbur Schwartz — alto sax, clarinet; Gerald Yelverton — alto sax, clarinet; Tex Beneke — tenor sax; Al Klink — tenor sax	Chummy MacGregor — piano; Dick Fisher — guitar; Rolly Bundock — bass; Maurice Purtill — drums; Ray Eberle — vocals; Marion Hutton — vocals	none
September 8–November 10, 1939	Glenn Miller — trombone; Al Mastren — trombone; Paul Tanner — trombone; Tommy Mack — trombone (stand-in); Mickey McMickle — trumpet; Clyde Hurley — trumpet; Legh Knowles — trumpet; Johnny Best — trumpet	Hal McIntyre — alto sax, clarinet; Wilbur Schwartz — alto sax, clarinet; Jimmy Abato — alto sax, clarinet; Tex Beneke — tenor sax; Al Klink — tenor sax	Chummy MacGregor — piano; Dick Fisher — guitar; Rolly Bundock — bass; Maurice Purtill — drums; Ray Eberle — vocals; Marion Hutton — vocals	"Can I Help It?" (1939); "Bless You" (1939); "Faithful Forever" (1939); "Blue Rain" (1939)^{A}; "Indian Summer" (1939)^{A}; "It Was Written in the Stars" (1939)
September 8–November 10, 1939	Walter Barrow — trombone (session stand-in for Mack on September 11)	Hal McIntyre — alto sax, clarinet; Wilbur Schwartz — alto sax, clarinet; Jimmy Abato — alto sax, clarinet; Tex Beneke — tenor sax; Al Klink — tenor sax	Chummy MacGregor — piano; Dick Fisher — guitar; Rolly Bundock — bass; Maurice Purtill — drums; Ray Eberle — vocals; Marion Hutton — vocals	"Melancholy Lullaby" (1939)
September 8–November 10, 1939	Toby Tyler — trombone (session stand-in for Mack on September 25)	Hal McIntyre — alto sax, clarinet; Wilbur Schwartz — alto sax, clarinet; Jimmy Abato — alto sax, clarinet; Tex Beneke — tenor sax; Al Klink — tenor sax	Chummy MacGregor — piano; Dick Fisher — guitar; Rolly Bundock — bass; Maurice Purtill — drums; Ray Eberle — vocals; Marion Hutton — vocals	"Out of Space" (1939)
November 11, 1939 – January 23, 1940	Glenn Miller — trombone; Al Mastren — trombone; Paul Tanner — trombone; Frank D'Annolfo — trombone; Mickey McMickle — trumpet; Clyde Hurley — trumpet; Legh Knowles — trumpet; Johnny Best — trumpet	Hal McIntyre — alto sax, clarinet; Wilbur Schwartz — alto sax, clarinet; Jimmy Abato — alto sax, clarinet; Tex Beneke — tenor sax; Al Klink — tenor sax	Chummy MacGregor — piano; Dick Fisher — guitar; Rolly Bundock — bass; Maurice Purtill — drums; Ray Eberle — vocals; Marion Hutton — vocals	"Oh Johnny, Oh Johnny, Oh!" (1939); "Careless" (1939); "On a Little Street in Singapore" (1940); "Faithful to You" (1940); "In an Old Dutch Garden (By an Old Dutch Mill)" (1940)^{A}; "Ooh! What You Said" (1940); "When You Wish Upon a Star" (1940); "Give a Little Whistle" (1940); "Missouri Waltz" (1940); "Polka Dots and Moonbeams" (1940)^{B}
January 26, 1940	Glenn Miller — trombone; Paul Tanner — trombone; Frank D'Annolfo — trombone; Tommy Mack — trombone (stand-in); Mickey McMickle — trumpet; Clyde Hurley — trumpet; Legh Knowles — trumpet; Johnny Best — trumpet	Hal McIntyre — alto sax, clarinet; Wilbur Schwartz — alto sax, clarinet; Jimmy Abato — alto sax, clarinet; Tex Beneke — tenor sax; Al Klink — tenor sax	Chummy MacGregor — piano; Dick Fisher — guitar; Rolly Bundock — bass; Maurice Purtill — drums; Ray Eberle — vocals; Marion Hutton — vocals	"Imagination" (1940)^{B}; "The Rumba Jumps!" (1940)^{A}
January 29–30, 1940	Glenn Miller — trombone; Paul Tanner — trombone; Frank D'Annolfo — trombone; Howard Gibeling — trombone; Mickey McMickle — trumpet; Clyde Hurley — trumpet; Legh Knowles — trumpet; Johnny Best — trumpet	Hal McIntyre — alto sax, clarinet; Wilbur Schwartz — alto sax, clarinet; Jimmy Abato — alto sax, clarinet; Tex Beneke — tenor sax; Al Klink — tenor sax	Chummy MacGregor — piano; Dick Fisher — guitar; Rolly Bundock — bass; Maurice Purtill — drums; Ray Eberle — vocals; Marion Hutton — vocals	"The Woodpecker Song" (1940); "Star Dust" (1940); "Pennsylvania Six-Five Thousand" (1940)^{B}
January 31–February 11, 1940	Glenn Miller — trombone; Paul Tanner — trombone; Frank D'Annolfo — trombone; Tommy Mack — trombone (stand-in); Mickey McMickle — trumpet; Clyde Hurley — trumpet; Legh Knowles — trumpet; Johnny Best — trumpet	Hal McIntyre — alto sax, clarinet; Wilbur Schwartz — alto sax, clarinet; Jimmy Abato — alto sax, clarinet; Tex Beneke — tenor sax; Al Klink — tenor sax	Chummy MacGregor — piano; Dick Fisher — guitar; Rolly Bundock — bass; Maurice Purtill — drums; Ray Eberle — vocals; Marion Hutton — vocals	"Too Romantic" (1940); "Tuxedo Junction" (1940)
February 12–16, 1940	Glenn Miller — trombone; Paul Tanner — trombone; Frank D'Annolfo — trombone; Jimmy Priddy — trombone; Mickey McMickle — trumpet; Clyde Hurley — trumpet; Legh Knowles — trumpet; Johnny Best — trumpet	Hal McIntyre — alto sax, clarinet; Wilbur Schwartz — alto sax, clarinet; Jimmy Abato — alto sax, clarinet; Tex Beneke — tenor sax; Al Klink — tenor sax	Chummy MacGregor — piano; Dick Fisher — guitar; Rolly Bundock — bass; Maurice Purtill — drums; Ray Eberle — vocals; Marion Hutton — vocals	none
February 17–May 16, 1940	Glenn Miller — trombone; Paul Tanner — trombone; Frank D'Annolfo — trombone; Jimmy Priddy — trombone; Mickey McMickle — trumpet; Clyde Hurley — trumpet; Legh Knowles — trumpet; Johnny Best — trumpet	Hal McIntyre — alto sax, clarinet; Wilbur Schwartz — alto sax, clarinet; Ernie Caceres — alto sax, clarinet; Tex Beneke — tenor sax; Al Klink — tenor sax	Chummy MacGregor — piano; Dick Fisher — guitar; Rolly Bundock — bass; Maurice Purtill — drums; Ray Eberle — vocals; Marion Hutton — vocals	"Imagination" (1940)^{A}; "My! My!" (1940); "Sierra Sue" (1940); "Polka Dots and Moonbeams" (1940)^{A}; "The Rumba Jumps!" (1940)^{B}; "Hear My Song, Violetta" (1940); "Shake Down the Stars" (1940); "April Played the Fiddle" (1940); "Alice Blue Gown" (1940); "Devil May Care" (1940); "Fools Rush In (Where Angels Fear to Tread)" (1940); "Slow Freight" (1940)^{A}
February 17–May 16, 1940	Zeke Zarchy — trumpet (stand-in for McMickle from April 26 onwards)	Hal McIntyre — alto sax, clarinet; Wilbur Schwartz — alto sax, clarinet; Ernie Caceres — alto sax, clarinet; Tex Beneke — tenor sax; Al Klink — tenor sax	Chummy MacGregor — piano; Dick Fisher — guitar; Rolly Bundock — bass; Maurice Purtill — drums; Ray Eberle — vocals; Marion Hutton — vocals	"Slow Freight" (1940)^{B}; "The Nearness of You" (1940); "Pennsylvania Six-Five Thousand" (1940)^{A}; "Frenesi" (1941)^{B}
May 17–31, 1940	Glenn Miller — trombone; Paul Tanner — trombone; Frank D'Annolfo — trombone; Jimmy Priddy — trombone; Mickey McMickle — trumpet; Clyde Hurley — trumpet; Johnny Best — trumpet; Zeke Zarchy — trumpet	Hal McIntyre — alto sax, clarinet; Wilbur Schwartz — alto sax, clarinet; Ernie Caceres — alto sax, clarinet; Tex Beneke — tenor sax; Al Klink — tenor sax	Chummy MacGregor — piano; Jack Lathrop — guitar, vocals; Rolly Bundock — bass; Maurice Purtill — drums; Ray Eberle — vocals; Marion Hutton — vocals	none
May 31–August 29, 1940	Glenn Miller — trombone; Paul Tanner — trombone; Frank D'Annolfo — trombone; Jimmy Priddy — trombone; Johnny Best — trumpet; Mickey McMickle — trumpet; Zeke Zarchy — trumpet; Charles Frankhauser — trumpet	Hal McIntyre — alto sax, clarinet; Wilbur Schwartz — alto sax, clarinet; Ernie Caceres — alto sax, clarinet; Tex Beneke — tenor sax; Al Klink — tenor sax	Chummy MacGregor — piano; Jack Lathrop — guitar, vocals; Rolly Bundock — bass; Maurice Purtill — drums; Ray Eberle — vocals; Marion Hutton — vocals	"Blueberry Hill" (1940); "When the Swallows Come Back to Capistrano" (1940); "Angel Child" (1940); "Crosstown" (1940); "The Call of the Canyon" (1940); "I Wouldn't Take a Million" (1940); "A Handful of Stars" (1940)^{A}; "Make Believe Ballroom Time" (1940)^{B}
August 30–September 12, 1940	Glenn Miller — trombone; Paul Tanner — trombone; Frank D'Annolfo — trombone; Jimmy Priddy — trombone; Johnny Best — trumpet; Mickey McMickle — trumpet; Zeke Zarchy — trumpet; Charles Frankhauser — trumpet	Hal McIntyre — alto sax, clarinet; Wilbur Schwartz — alto sax, clarinet; Ernie Caceres — alto sax, clarinet; Tex Beneke — tenor sax; Al Klink — tenor sax	Chummy MacGregor — piano; Jack Lathrop — guitar, vocals; Tony Carlson — bass; Maurice Purtill — drums; Ray Eberle — vocals; Marion Hutton — vocals	"Beat Me Daddy, Eight to a Bar" (1940); "A Handful of Stars" (1940)^{B}; "Shadows on the Sand" (1940); "A Nightingale Sang in Berkeley Square" (1940)^{B}; "You Stepped Out of a Dream" (1941)^{B}
September 13–October 13, 1940	Glenn Miller — trombone; Paul Tanner — trombone; Frank D'Annolfo — trombone; Jimmy Priddy — trombone; Johnny Best — trumpet; Mickey McMickle — trumpet; Zeke Zarchy — trumpet; Charles Frankhauser — trumpet	Hal McIntyre — alto sax, clarinet; Wilbur Schwartz — alto sax, clarinet; Ernie Caceres — alto sax, clarinet; Tex Beneke — tenor sax; Al Klink — tenor sax	Chummy MacGregor — piano; Jack Lathrop — guitar, vocals; Trigger Alpert — bass; Maurice Purtill — drums; Ray Eberle — vocals; Marion Hutton — vocals	"I'd Know You Anywhere" (1940); "Make Believe Ballroom Time" (1940)^{A}; "A Nightingale Sang in Berkeley Square" (1940)^{A}
October 13–23, 1940	Glenn Miller — trombone; Paul Tanner — trombone; Frank D'Annolfo — trombone; Jimmy Priddy — trombone; Johnny Best — trumpet; Mickey McMickle — trumpet; Charles Frankhauser — trumpet; Phil Rommel — trumpet	Hal McIntyre — alto sax, clarinet; Wilbur Schwartz — alto sax, clarinet; Ernie Caceres — alto sax, clarinet; Tex Beneke — tenor sax; Al Klink — tenor sax	Chummy MacGregor — piano; Jack Lathrop — guitar, vocals; Trigger Alpert — bass; Maurice Purtill — drums; Ray Eberle — vocals; Marion Hutton — vocals	none
October 24–31, 1940	Glenn Miller — trombone; Paul Tanner — trombone; Frank D'Annolfo — trombone; Jimmy Priddy — trombone; Johnny Best — trumpet; Mickey McMickle — trumpet; Charles Frankhauser — trumpet; Max Kaminsky — trumpet (stand-in)	Hal McIntyre — alto sax, clarinet; Wilbur Schwartz — alto sax, clarinet; Ernie Caceres — alto sax, clarinet; Tex Beneke — tenor sax; Al Klink — tenor sax	Chummy MacGregor — piano; Jack Lathrop — guitar, vocals; Trigger Alpert — bass; Maurice Purtill — drums; Ray Eberle — vocals; Marion Hutton — vocals	none
November 1–3, 1940	Glenn Miller — trombone; Paul Tanner — trombone; Frank D'Annolfo — trombone; Jimmy Priddy — trombone; Johnny Best — trumpet; Mickey McMickle — trumpet; Charles Frankhauser — trumpet; Ray Anthony — trumpet	Hal McIntyre — alto sax, clarinet; Wilbur Schwartz — alto sax, clarinet; Ernie Caceres — alto sax, clarinet; Tex Beneke — tenor sax; Al Klink — tenor sax	Chummy MacGregor — piano; Jack Lathrop — guitar, vocals; Trigger Alpert — bass; Maurice Purtill — drums; Ray Eberle — vocals; Marion Hutton — vocals	none
November 4, 1940 – January 9, 1941	Glenn Miller — trombone; Paul Tanner — trombone; Frank D'Annolfo — trombone; Jimmy Priddy — trombone; Johnny Best — trumpet; Mickey McMickle — trumpet; Ray Anthony — trumpet; Billy May — trumpet	Hal McIntyre — alto sax, clarinet; Wilbur Schwartz — alto sax, clarinet; Ernie Caceres — alto sax, clarinet; Tex Beneke — tenor sax; Al Klink — tenor sax	Chummy MacGregor — piano; Jack Lathrop — guitar, vocals; Trigger Alpert — bass; Maurice Purtill — drums; Ray Eberle — vocals; Marion Hutton — vocals	"Do You Know Why" (1940); "Somewhere" (1941); "Along the Santa Fe Trail" (1940); "Anvil Chorus" (1940); "Frenesi" (1941)^{A}; "The Mem'ry of a Rose" (1941); "I Do, Do You? (Do You Believe in Love)" (1941); "Song of the Volga Boatmen" (1941)^{B}; "I Dreamt I Dwelt in Harlem" (1941)^{B}; "Here We Go Again" (1944)^{B}; "Helpless" (1944)^{A}
January 10–12, 1941	Glenn Miller — trombone; Paul Tanner — trombone; Frank D'Annolfo — trombone; Jimmy Priddy — trombone; Johnny Best — trumpet; Mickey McMickle — trumpet; Ray Anthony — trumpet; Billy May — trumpet	Hal McIntyre — alto sax, clarinet; Wilbur Schwartz — alto sax, clarinet; Ernie Caceres — alto sax, clarinet; Tex Beneke — tenor sax; Al Klink — tenor sax	Chummy MacGregor — piano; Jack Lathrop — guitar, vocals; Trigger Alpert — bass; Maurice Purtill — drums; Ray Eberle — vocals; Dorothy Claire — vocals	none
January 13–March 20, 1941	Glenn Miller — trombone; Paul Tanner — trombone; Frank D'Annolfo — trombone; Jimmy Priddy — trombone; Johnny Best — trumpet; Mickey McMickle — trumpet; Ray Anthony — trumpet; Billy May — trumpet	Hal McIntyre — alto sax, clarinet; Wilbur Schwartz — alto sax, clarinet; Ernie Caceres — alto sax, clarinet; Tex Beneke — tenor sax; Al Klink — tenor sax	Chummy MacGregor — piano; Jack Lathrop — guitar, vocals; Trigger Alpert — bass; Maurice Purtill — drums; Ray Eberle — vocals; Dorothy Claire — vocals; The Modernaires — vocals	"Song of the Volga Boatmen" (1941)^{A}; "You Stepped Out of a Dream" (1941)^{A}; "I Dreamt I Dwelt in Harlem" (1941)^{A}; "A Little Old Church in England" (1941); "It's Always You" (1941); "Perfidia" (1941); "The One I Love (Belongs to Somebody Else)" (1941); "The Spirit Is Willing" (1941); "The Cowboy Serenade (While I'm Rollin' My Last Cigarette)" (1941)^{B}
March 21–May 22, 1941	Glenn Miller — trombone; Paul Tanner — trombone; Frank D'Annolfo — trombone; Jimmy Priddy — trombone; Johnny Best — trumpet; Mickey McMickle — trumpet; Ray Anthony — trumpet; Billy May — trumpet	Hal McIntyre — alto sax, clarinet; Wilbur Schwartz — alto sax, clarinet; Ernie Caceres — alto sax, clarinet; Tex Beneke — tenor sax; Al Klink — tenor sax	Chummy MacGregor — piano; Jack Lathrop — guitar, vocals; Trigger Alpert — bass; Maurice Purtill — drums; Ray Eberle — vocals; Paula Kelly — vocals; The Modernaires — vocals	"Boulder Buff" (1941); "I Know Why" (1941)
March 21–May 22, 1941	Harry Geller — trumpet (stand-in for Best on May 20)	Hal McIntyre — alto sax, clarinet; Wilbur Schwartz — alto sax, clarinet; Ernie Caceres — alto sax, clarinet; Tex Beneke — tenor sax; Al Klink — tenor sax	Chummy MacGregor — piano; Jack Lathrop — guitar, vocals; Trigger Alpert — bass; Maurice Purtill — drums; Ray Eberle — vocals; Paula Kelly — vocals; The Modernaires — vocals	"Don't Cry, Cherie" (1941); "Peekaboo to You" (1941)^{B}
March 21–May 22, 1941	Joe Meyer — trumpet (stand-in for Best on May 21)	Hal McIntyre — alto sax, clarinet; Wilbur Schwartz — alto sax, clarinet; Ernie Caceres — alto sax, clarinet; Tex Beneke — tenor sax; Al Klink — tenor sax	Chummy MacGregor — piano; Jack Lathrop — guitar, vocals; Trigger Alpert — bass; Maurice Purtill — drums; Ray Eberle — vocals; Paula Kelly — vocals; The Modernaires — vocals	none
March 21–May 22, 1941	Lennie Mach — trumpet (stand-in for Best on May 22)	Hal McIntyre — alto sax, clarinet; Wilbur Schwartz — alto sax, clarinet; Ernie Caceres — alto sax, clarinet; Tex Beneke — tenor sax; Al Klink — tenor sax	Chummy MacGregor — piano; Jack Lathrop — guitar, vocals; Trigger Alpert — bass; Maurice Purtill — drums; Ray Eberle — vocals; Paula Kelly — vocals; The Modernaires — vocals	none
May 23–June 13, 1941	Glenn Miller — trombone; Paul Tanner — trombone; Frank D'Annolfo — trombone; Jimmy Priddy — trombone; Johnny Best — trumpet; Mickey McMickle — trumpet; Ray Anthony — trumpet; Billy May — trumpet	Hal McIntyre — alto sax, clarinet; Wilbur Schwartz — alto sax, clarinet; Ernie Caceres — alto sax, clarinet; Tex Beneke — tenor sax; Al Klink — tenor sax	Chummy MacGregor — piano; Bill Conway — guitar (stand-in); Trigger Alpert — bass; Maurice Purtill — drums; Ray Eberle — vocals; Paula Kelly — vocals; The Modernaires — vocals	"I Guess I'll Have to Dream the Rest" (1941); "Peekaboo to You" (1941)^{A}; "You and I" (1941)^{B}
June 14–23, 1941	Glenn Miller — trombone; Paul Tanner — trombone; Frank D'Annolfo — trombone; Jimmy Priddy — trombone; Johnny Best — trumpet; Mickey McMickle — trumpet; Ray Anthony — trumpet; Billy May — trumpet	Hal McIntyre — alto sax, clarinet; Wilbur Schwartz — alto sax, clarinet; Ernie Caceres — alto sax, clarinet; Tex Beneke — tenor sax; Al Klink — tenor sax	Chummy MacGregor — piano; Bill Conway — guitar; Meyer Rubin — bass (stand-in); Maurice Purtill — drums; Ray Eberle — vocals; Paula Kelly — vocals; The Modernaires — vocals	none
June 24–July 7, 1941	Glenn Miller — trombone; Paul Tanner — trombone; Frank D'Annolfo — trombone; Jimmy Priddy — trombone; Johnny Best — trumpet; Mickey McMickle — trumpet; Ray Anthony — trumpet; Billy May — trumpet	Hal McIntyre — alto sax, clarinet; Wilbur Schwartz — alto sax, clarinet; Ernie Caceres — alto sax, clarinet; Tex Beneke — tenor sax; Al Klink — tenor sax	Chummy MacGregor — piano; Bill Conway — guitar; Doc Goldberg — bass; Maurice Purtill — drums; Ray Eberle — vocals; Paula Kelly — vocals; The Modernaires — vocals	none
June 24–July 7, 1941	Warren Smith — trombone (stand-in for D'Annolfo from June 24–26)	Hal McIntyre — alto sax, clarinet; Wilbur Schwartz — alto sax, clarinet; Ernie Caceres — alto sax, clarinet; Tex Beneke — tenor sax; Al Klink — tenor sax	Chummy MacGregor — piano; Bill Conway — guitar; Doc Goldberg — bass; Maurice Purtill — drums; Ray Eberle — vocals; Paula Kelly — vocals; The Modernaires — vocals	"You and I" (1941)^{A}; "Under Blue Canadian Skies" (1941); "The Cowboy Serenade (While I'm Rollin' My Last Cigarette)" (1941)^{A}
July 8–9, 1941	Glenn Miller — trombone; Paul Tanner — trombone; Frank D'Annolfo — trombone; Jimmy Priddy — trombone; Johnny Best — trumpet; Mickey McMickle — trumpet; Billy May — trumpet; Alec Fila — trumpet	Hal McIntyre — alto sax, clarinet; Wilbur Schwartz — alto sax, clarinet; Ernie Caceres — alto sax, clarinet; Tex Beneke — tenor sax; Al Klink — tenor sax	Chummy MacGregor — piano; Bill Conway — guitar; Doc Goldberg — bass; Maurice Purtill — drums; Ray Eberle — vocals; Paula Kelly — vocals; The Modernaires — vocals	none
July 10–August 14, 1941	Glenn Miller — trombone; Paul Tanner — trombone; Frank D'Annolfo — trombone; Jimmy Priddy — trombone; Johnny Best — trumpet; Mickey McMickle — trumpet; Billy May — trumpet; Alec Fila — trumpet	Hal McIntyre — alto sax, clarinet; Wilbur Schwartz — alto sax, clarinet; Ernie Caceres — alto sax, clarinet; Tex Beneke — tenor sax; Al Klink — tenor sax	Chummy MacGregor — piano; Bobby Hackett — guitar; Doc Goldberg — bass; Maurice Purtill — drums; Ray Eberle — vocals; Paula Kelly — vocals; The Modernaires — vocals	"It Happened in Sun Valley" (1941); "Elmer's Tune" (1941); "From One Love to Another (Danza Lucumi)" (1941)
August 15–October 6, 1941	Glenn Miller — trombone; Paul Tanner — trombone; Frank D'Annolfo — trombone; Jimmy Priddy — trombone; Johnny Best — trumpet; Mickey McMickle — trumpet; Billy May — trumpet; Alec Fila — trumpet	Hal McIntyre — alto sax, clarinet; Wilbur Schwartz — alto sax, clarinet; Ernie Caceres — alto sax, clarinet; Tex Beneke — tenor sax; Al Klink — tenor sax	Chummy MacGregor — piano; Bobby Hackett — guitar; Doc Goldberg — bass; Maurice Purtill — drums; Ray Eberle — vocals; Marion Hutton — vocals; The Modernaires — vocals	"The Man in the Moon" (1941); "This Time the Dream's on Me" (1941); "Dear Arabella" (1941)
October 7–21, 1941	Glenn Miller — trombone; Paul Tanner — trombone; Frank D'Annolfo — trombone; Jimmy Priddy — trombone; Johnny Best — trumpet; Mickey McMickle — trumpet; Billy May — trumpet; Alec Fila — trumpet	Wilbur Schwartz — alto sax, clarinet; Ernie Caceres — alto sax, clarinet; Benny Feman — alto sax; Tex Beneke — tenor sax; Al Klink — tenor sax	Chummy MacGregor — piano; Bobby Hackett — guitar; Doc Goldberg — bass; Maurice Purtill — drums; Ray Eberle — vocals; Marion Hutton — vocals; The Modernaires — vocals	"Dreamsville, Ohio" (1941); "Jingle Bells" (1941); "Humpty Dumpty Heart" (1941)^{B}
October 22–November 13, 1941	Glenn Miller — trombone; Paul Tanner — trombone; Frank D'Annolfo — trombone; Jimmy Priddy — trombone; Johnny Best — trumpet; Mickey McMickle — trumpet; Billy May — trumpet; Alec Fila — trumpet	Tex Beneke — alto sax, vocals; Wilbur Schwartz — alto sax, clarinet; Ernie Caceres — alto sax, clarinet; Al Klink — tenor sax; Babe Russin — tenor sax	Chummy MacGregor — piano; Bobby Hackett — guitar; Doc Goldberg — bass; Maurice Purtill — drums; Ray Eberle — vocals; Marion Hutton — vocals; The Modernaires — vocals	"Ev'rything I Love" (1941); "Humpty Dumpty Heart" (1941)^{A}; "Day Dreaming" (1941); "Conchita Marquita Lolita Pepita Rosita Juanita Lopez" (1942)^{B}
November 14, 1941 – January 26, 1942	Glenn Miller — trombone; Paul Tanner — trombone; Frank D'Annolfo — trombone; Jimmy Priddy — trombone; Johnny Best — trumpet; Mickey McMickle — trumpet; Billy May — trumpet; Bobby Hackett — trumpet	Wilbur Schwartz — alto sax, clarinet; Ernie Caceres — alto sax, clarinet; Skip Martin — alto sax; Tex Beneke — tenor sax, vocals; Al Klink — tenor sax	Chummy MacGregor — piano; Bill Conway — guitar; Doc Goldberg — bass; Maurice Purtill — drums; Ray Eberle — vocals; Marion Hutton — vocals; The Modernaires — vocals	none
November 14, 1941 – January 26, 1942	Zeke Zarchy — trumpet (session stand-in for Hackett until January 7, 1942)	Wilbur Schwartz — alto sax, clarinet; Ernie Caceres — alto sax, clarinet; Skip Martin — alto sax; Tex Beneke — tenor sax, vocals; Al Klink — tenor sax	Bobby Hackett — guitar (session stand-in for Conway)	"Moonlight Sonata" (1941); "(There'll Be Blue Birds Over) The White Cliffs of Dover" (1941); "Moonlight Cocktail" (1941); "Fooled" (1942); "At the President's Ball" (1942); "Dear Mom" (1942)^{B}; "Let's Have Another Cup o' Coffee" (1942); "The Story of a Starry Night" (1942)^{A}; "On the Old Assembly Line" (1942)^{A}
November 14, 1941 – January 26, 1942	Bill Graham — trumpet (session stand-in for Hackett on January 8)	Wilbur Schwartz — alto sax, clarinet; Ernie Caceres — alto sax, clarinet; Skip Martin — alto sax; Tex Beneke — tenor sax, vocals; Al Klink — tenor sax	Bobby Hackett — guitar (session stand-in for Conway)	"When the Roses Bloom Again" (1942); "Dear Mom" (1942)^{A}; "The Story of a Starry Night" (1942)^{B}
January 27–July 12, 1942	Glenn Miller — trombone; Paul Tanner — trombone; Frank D'Annolfo — trombone; Jimmy Priddy — trombone; Johnny Best — trumpet; Mickey McMickle — trumpet; Billy May — trumpet; Steve Lipkins — trumpet	Wilbur Schwartz — alto sax, clarinet; Ernie Caceres — alto sax, clarinet; Skip Martin — alto sax; Tex Beneke — tenor sax, vocals; Al Klink — tenor sax	Chummy MacGregor — piano; Bobby Hackett — guitar; Doc Goldberg — bass; Maurice Purtill — drums; Ray Eberle — vocals; Marion Hutton — vocals; The Modernaires — vocals	"The Lamplighter's Serenade" (1942); "On the Old Assembly Line" (1942)^{B}; "She'll Always Remember" (1942); "American Patrol" (1942); "Sweet Eloise" (1942); "Knit One, Purl Two" (1942); "Yesterday's Gardenias" (1942); "(I've Got a Gal In) Kalamazoo" (1942); "Serenade in Blue" (1942); "Conchita Marquita Lolita Pepita Rosita Juanita Lopez" (1942)^{A}
January 27–July 12, 1942	Glenn Miller — trombone; Paul Tanner — trombone; Frank D'Annolfo — trombone; Jimmy Priddy — trombone; Johnny Best — trumpet; Mickey McMickle — trumpet; Billy May — trumpet; Steve Lipkins — trumpet	Roy Parkinson — tenor sax (stand-in for Beneke on March 18)	Chummy MacGregor — piano; Bobby Hackett — guitar; Doc Goldberg — bass; Maurice Purtill — drums; Ray Eberle — vocals; Marion Hutton — vocals; The Modernaires — vocals	none
July 12–September 17, 1942	Glenn Miller — trombone; Paul Tanner — trombone; Frank D'Annolfo — trombone; Jimmy Priddy — trombone; Johnny Best — trumpet; Mickey McMickle — trumpet; Billy May — trumpet; Steve Lipkins — trumpet	Wilbur Schwartz — alto sax, clarinet; Ernie Caceres — alto sax, clarinet; Skip Martin — alto sax; Tex Beneke — tenor sax, vocals; Al Klink — tenor sax	Chummy MacGregor — piano; Bobby Hackett — guitar; Doc Goldberg — bass; Maurice Purtill — drums; Skip Nelson — vocals; Marion Hutton — vocals; The Modernaires — vocals	"Dearly Beloved" (1942); "Juke Box Saturday Night" (1942); "Moonlight Becomes You" (1942); "That Old Black Magic" (1942); "Rhapsody in Blue" (1942)^{A}; "Blue Rain" (1943)^{B}; "It Must Be Jelly ('Cause Jam Don't Shake Like That)" (1943); "Here We Go Again" (1944)^{A}
September 18–27, 1942	Glenn Miller — trombone; Paul Tanner — trombone; Frank D'Annolfo — trombone; Jimmy Priddy — trombone; Johnny Best — trumpet; Mickey McMickle — trumpet; Billy May — trumpet; Bobby Hackett — trumpet	Wilbur Schwartz — alto sax, clarinet; Ernie Caceres — alto sax, clarinet; Skip Martin — alto sax; Tex Beneke — tenor sax, vocals; Al Klink — tenor sax	Chummy MacGregor — piano; Bill Conway — guitar; Doc Goldberg — bass; Maurice Purtill — drums; Skip Nelson — vocals; Marion Hutton — vocals; The Modernaires — vocals	none

== See also ==
- Glenn Miller Orchestra (1956–present)

== Bibliography ==
- Simon, George T. (1974a), Glenn Miller & his Orchestra (PDF), Boston, Massachusetts: Da Capo Press
- Flower, John (1972), Moonlight Serenade: A Bio-Discography of the Glenn Miller Civilian Band (PDF), New York City, New York: Arlington House Publishers
- Simon, George T. (1974b), The Big Bands (PDF) (3rd ed.), New York City, New York: Collier Books
