= Caribbean Clipper =

Song by the Glenn Miller Orchestra
- A-side: "Blue Rain"
- Published: Mutual Music Society, Inc.
- Released: 1943
- Recorded: July 14, 1942
- Studio: Victor Studios
- Genre: Big band; jump blues
- Length: 2:45
- Label: Victor
- Composer: Jerry Gray
- Lyricist: Sammy Gallop

"Caribbean Clipper" is a big band and jump song recorded by Glenn Miller and his Orchestra in 1942. The song was composed by Jerry Gray with lyrics by Sammy Gallop. Recorded in 1942, the song was released as a Victor 78 single by Glenn Miller and His Orchestra in 1943 as the B side to "Blue Rain".

The title is a reference to the Pan American Airways Caribbean Clipper, which was one of the first commercial airliners to fly regularly scheduled transatlantic routes. Originally, a clipper was a fast ship.

The song was part of a number of songs—including "Sun Valley Jump", "Here We Go Again", "The Spirit Is Willing", "The Man in the Moon" and "A String of Pearls"—written by Gray, a member of the Glenn Miller Orchestra as an arranger, specially for Glenn Miller, who recorded it in 1942. The music was copyrighted on July 10, 1942. The song was registered with the United States Copyright Office on October 23, 1942, by the Mutual Music Society.

== Recordings ==
=== Glenn Miller ===
"Caribbean Clipper" (1942 Glenn Miller Orchestra recording)
1942 "Chesterfield Broadcast" recording by The Glenn Miller Orchestra

Miller recorded a number of versions of the song, some of which were broadcast on radio programs such as his Chesterfield Broadcasts in 1942. He recorded the studio version at Victor Studios, Chicago, Illinois, on July 14, 1942. He released the song on Victor in 1943 as a 78 single as the B-side to "Blue Rain". This recording featured Maurice Purtill on drums. Mel Powell played piano on performances with the Glenn Miller Army Air Force Band. Billboard magazine ran an advert for the release that stated that "no hep nickel will miss this one!". Miller made a recording for the Treasury Star Parade—syndicated by the United States Department of the Treasury—on February 11, 1944. This recording was included on Magic Records' compilation The Glenn Miller Service Orchestra in the USA and Europe (Volume II).

Miller also recorded a version of the song directly for broadcast on CBS Radio's I Sustain the Wings show. The recording was made at the war bond rally at the Chicago Theatre on April 15, 1944.

Miller later recorded the song in Studio One at Abbey Road Studios (then known as EMI Studios) on November 27, 1944, as part of a propaganda broadcast. Recorded under the name "The American Band of the Allied Expeditionary Force", the session became Miller's last recording session before his disappearance. The broadcast was later issued on a number of albums including The Lost Recordings.

==== Personnel ====
The personnel for Miller's 1944 Abbey Road recording were:

- Brass
  - Zeke Zarchy (trumpet)
  - Bernie Privin (trumpet)
  - Bobby Nichols (trumpet)
  - Whitey Thomas (trumpet)
  - Jack Steele (trumpet)
  - Jimmy Priddy (trombone)
  - John Halliburton (trombone)
  - Larry Hall (trombone)
  - Nat Peck (trombone)
  - Addison Collins (french horn)
- Woodwind
  - Hank Freeman (alto saxophone)
  - Peanuts Hucko (alto saxophone, tenor saxophone, clarinet)
  - Vince Carbone (tenor saxophone)
  - Jack Ferrier (tenor saxophone)
  - Freddy Guerra (alto saxophone)
  - Manny Thaler (baritone saxophone, alto saxophone, bass clarinet, clarinet)
- Piano
  - Mel Powell
- Guitar
  - Carmen Mastren
- Double bass
  - Trigger Alpert
- Drums
  - Ray McKinley

A number of strings musicians were part of the ensemble, but the song's orchestration did not require their performance.

=== Other versions ===
In August and September 1950, a band led by Jerry Gray—billed as the "Ex-Glenn Miller Men" and including musicians such as Willie Schwartz, Jimmy Priddy and Johnny Best—performed the song at the Hollywood Palladium; a recording of the concert was released through Jazz Hour Records. The Modernaires recorded a version featuring the lyrics which was released as a United Artists single in 1962. The U.S. Air Force Airmen of Note recorded the song in 1993. The song was performed by the BBC Big Band as part of their Glenn Miller tribute concert at Birmingham Town Hall on November 14, 2011. Other artists to record versions of the song include the Syd Lawrence Orchestra, the New Glenn Miller Orchestra led by Ray McKinley, The Glenn Miller Orchestra directed by Wil Salden, Jan Slottenäs Orchestra, the Herb Miller Orchestra, and Joe Loss. The Mint Julep Jazz Band released a recording in 2022.

=== Album appearances ===
- Limited Edition, 1953
- Glenn Miller: Army Air Force Band, 1955
- On Tour with the New Glenn Miller Orchestra, 1959
- The Modernaires Sing the Glenn Miller Instrumentals, 1961
- The Unforgettable Glenn Miller, 1968
- The Popular Recordings, 1938-1942, 1989
- The Complete Glenn Miller and His Orchestra, 1989
- The Missing Chapters: Volume One: American Patrol, 1995
- The Lost Recordings, 1996
- The Secret Broadcasts, 1996
- The Best of The Lost Recordings and The Secret Broadcasts, 1998
- Glenn Miller: The Army Air Force Band, 1955 album remastered, 2001
