= A String of Pearls (song) =

Jazz standard by Jerry Gray and Eddie DeLange

- 1941 RCA Bluebird 78, B-11382-B

Single by Glenn Miller and His Orchestra
- A-side: "Day Dreaming"
- Published: 1941
- Released: December 5, 1941
- Recorded: November 3, 1941
- Genre: Big band
- Length: 3:15
- Label: Bluebird
- Composer: Jerry Gray
- Lyricist: Eddie DeLange

Sheet music cover, Mutual Music Society, Inc., New York

"A String of Pearls" is a 1941 song recorded by Glenn Miller and his Orchestra on RCA Bluebird that November, becoming a No. 1 hit. It was composed by Jerry Gray with lyrics by Eddie DeLange. The song is a big band and jazz standard.

== Background ==
On November 8, 1941, Glenn Miller and His Orchestra recorded "A String of Pearls", which was copyrighted and published by the Mutual Music Society, Inc., ASCAP.

It was released as an RCA Bluebird 78 single, B-11382-B. It was the B side of "Day Dreaming".

The personnel for "A String of Pearls": Saxes: Babe Russin, Tex Beneke, Wilbur Schwartz, Ernie Caceres, Al Klink; trumpets: Johnny Best, R. D. McMickle, Billy May, Alec Fila; trombones: Glenn Miller, Jimmy Priddy, Paul Tanner, Frank D'Annolfo; piano: Chummy MacGregor; string bass: Edward "Doc" Goldberg; guitar/cornet: Bobby Hackett; and drums: Moe Purtill. Bobby Hackett performed the cornet solo on the original Glenn Miller recording.

The record was ranked number one in the U.S. for two weeks in 1942 on the Billboard Best Sellers chart in a chart run of 21 weeks.

== Other versions ==
- Connee Boswell's recording for Decca Records in 1942 was among the first vocals of the song ever pressed.
- It was also recorded by Benny Goodman, The Benny Goodman recording was released as a V-Disc 78 single as No. 409A by the U.S. War Department in April, 1945.

Other artists recording it include:

- Harry James
- Woody Herman
- Ritchie Lee
- Kurt Edelhagen
- Barney Kessel
- Floyd Cramer
- Dick Schory's Percussion Pops Orchestra
- Ernie Fields
- James Last

== In popular culture and media ==
- The song was featured in the 1953 Glenn Miller biopic The Glenn Miller Story starring James Stewart.
- It appeared in Mike Nichol's 1971 film Carnal Knowledge.
- "A String of Pearls" was featured on a 1972 episode of The Lawrence Welk Show in the episode entitled "Songs of the '40s".
- The instrumental version appeared on a 1976 episode of the CBS series The Carol Burnett Show.
- The song was played on the radio in the 1977 film Oh, God! starring John Denver and George Burns.
