= Bob Chester =

American jazz musician (1908–1966)

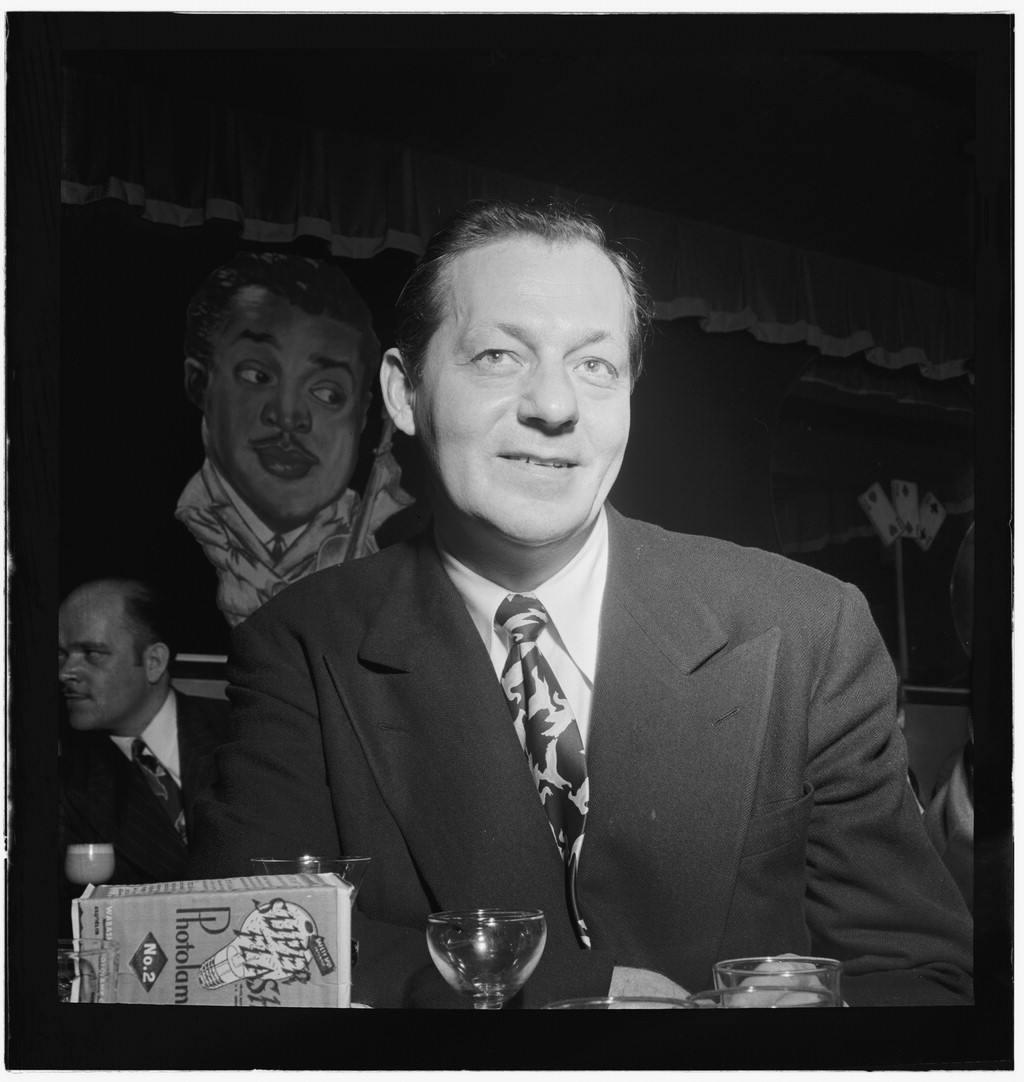
- Bob Chester, photographed by William P. Gottlieb, June 1946

Background information
- Born: March 20, 1908; Detroit, Michigan, United States
- Died: October 29, 1966 (aged 58) Detroit, Michigan, United States
- Genre: Jazz
- Occupations: Musician; Bandleader
- Instrument: Saxophone
- Years active: 1930s–1950s
- Label: Bluebird
- Formerly of: Tommy Dorsey

Bob Chester (March 20, 1908 – October 29, 1966) was an American jazz and pop music bandleader and tenor saxophonist.

Chester was born in Detroit, Michigan, United States. His stepfather ran General Motors's Fisher Body Works.

== Music career ==
He started in music as a sideman under Irving Aaronson, Ben Bernie, and Ben Pollack. He formed his own group in Detroit in the mid-1930s, with a Glenn Miller-influenced sound. This band was unsuccessful in local engagements and quickly dissolved. He then put together a new band on the East Coast under the direction of Tommy Dorsey, with arrangements by David Rose. This ensemble fared better, and signed a recording contract with Bluebird Records.

Chester's group, billed "The New Sensation of the Nation," had a radio show on CBS in the fall of 1939. The 25-minute program was transmitted from the Hotel Van Cleve in Dayton, Ohio, late Thursday nights (actually 12:30 am Friday morning, Eastern Time); the September 21, 1939 edition can be heard on the One Day In Radio tapes, archived by Washington D.C. station WJSV.

Chester's Bluebird records sold well, both for retail dealers and coin phonograph operators. His regional hits included "From Maine to California"; "Wait Till the Sun Shines, Nellie"; "Madeliaine"; and two songs from "Banjo Eyes" - "Not a Care in the World" and "A Nickel to My Name". His only national hit was "With the Wind and the Rain in Your Hair" (b/w "I Walk With Music"; Bluebird 10614), which featured Dolores O'Neill on vocals. It rose to No. 18 on national charts in April 1940.

Chester's orchestra included trumpeters Alec Fila, Nick Travis, Lou Mucci, and Conrad Gozzo, saxophonists Herbie Steward and Peanuts Hucko, drummer Irv Kluger, and trombonist Bill Harris. His female singers included Dolores O'Neill, Kathleen Lane, and Betty Bradley; among his male singers were Gene Howard, Peter Marshall, Bob Haymes, and Al Stuart.

The orchestra disbanded in the mid-1940s, due in part to the shrinking market for big band sound. After a stint as a disc jockey at WKMH radio, Chester assembled another band for a short time in the early 1950s, but after it failed he retired from music and returned to Detroit, to work for the rest of his life in auto manufacturing.

Bob Chester died in October 1966, at the age of 58.
