= Clyde Hurley =

American jazz trumpeter (1916–1963)

- Advertisement for Selmer instruments. New York, September 25 – November 20, 1939.

Background information
- Born: September 3, 1916; Fort Worth, Texas, U.S.
- Died: August 14, 1963 (aged 46) Fort Worth, Texas, U.S.
- Genres: big band, jazz, swing
- Occupation: Musician
- Instrument: Trumpet
- Years active: c. 1937–1955
- Formerly of: Ben Pollack, Glenn Miller Band, Tommy Dorsey, Artie Shaw

Clyde Lanham Hurley, Jr. (September 3, 1916 – August 14, 1963) was a trumpeter during the big band era. He was born in Fort Worth, Texas, to Clyde Lanham Hurley and Esther Brown. Scott Yanow describes Hurley as "a fine trumpeter with a fat tone and a hard-driving style". He died of a coronary occlusion in Fort Worth leaving two sons and a former wife.

== Career ==
Self-taught, he learned to play the trumpet by playing along with Louis Armstrong records. His talent was encouraged and nurtured by his mother, Esther Brown Hurley, who had a career in the early days of Texas radio traveling by train from Fort Worth to stations in San Antonio and Houston where she sang and played piano live. He studied music at the Texas Christian University in Fort Worth from 1932 to 1936 where he participated in the school's jazz band. He began his career working with territory bands. In 1937, while drummer/band-leader Ben Pollack was touring through Texas he heard Hurley and invited him to join his orchestra where Hurley soloed on "So Unexpectedly". After a year with Pollack, while on tour in Los Angeles, Hurley left to become a studio musician. Hurley was playing with Paul Whiteman when Glenn Miller sent for him to join the Miller band on its Glen Island Casino opening in May 1939, the year following fellow Fort Worthian Tex Beneke joining Miller's band. Beneke recommended Hurley to Miller.

During the time he was with Miller, Hurley was one of the key soloists. He appeared on the band's studio recordings and live performances throughout America, including Carnegie Hall, Cafe Rouge in Hotel Pennsylvania and the Paramount Theatre, New York City. He shared trumpet solo honors with John Best, with Hurley taking the "hot" solos and Best taking the rest. Hurley played the trumpet solo on Glenn Miller's "In The Mood", "Slip Horn Jive" and "Tuxedo Junction." After a difference of opinion with Miller over the style of music the band was playing, Hurley left Miller in May 1940 to work with Tommy Dorsey and then joined Artie Shaw in 1941.

After his stint with Shaw, he did freelance work for the movie studios. In 1941, he played the trumpet track for the classic Walter Lantz cartoon "Boogie Woogie Bugle Boy of Company B." He worked for MGM from 1944 to 1949 and for NBC from 1950 to 1955. During the late 1950s, Hurley played in Dixieland groups, recording with Matty Matlock's Rampart Street Paraders. In 1954, he recorded live with Ralph Sutton and Edmond Hall at the Club Hangover. His studio work in the 1950s included sessions with Paul Weston. He played solo on "Memories of You" on Weston's "Solo Flight" album.

== Family ==
On April 20, 1940, Hurley was listed in the census as living with his then wife, Katherine Ann Foster (b. June 7, 1917, d. September 3, 1994) at 4114 Prescott Ave., Dallas, Texas, the house of his in-laws. Hurley had two sons: Clyde Lanham Hurley III (b. 1937, d. 2022); and Lawrence Foster Hurley (b. 1941).

== Sources ==
- Flower, John (1972). Moonlight Serenade: a bio-discography of the Glenn Miller Civilian Band. New Rochelle, NY: Arlington House. ISBN 0-87000-161-2.
- Simon, George Thomas (1980). Glenn Miller and His Orchestra. New York: Da Capo paperback. ISBN 0-306-80129-9.
- Schuller, Gunther (1991). The Swing Era: The Development of Jazz, 1930–1945. New York: Oxford University Press. ISBN 0-19-507140-9.
