= Paula Kelly (singer) =

American big band singer (1919–1992)

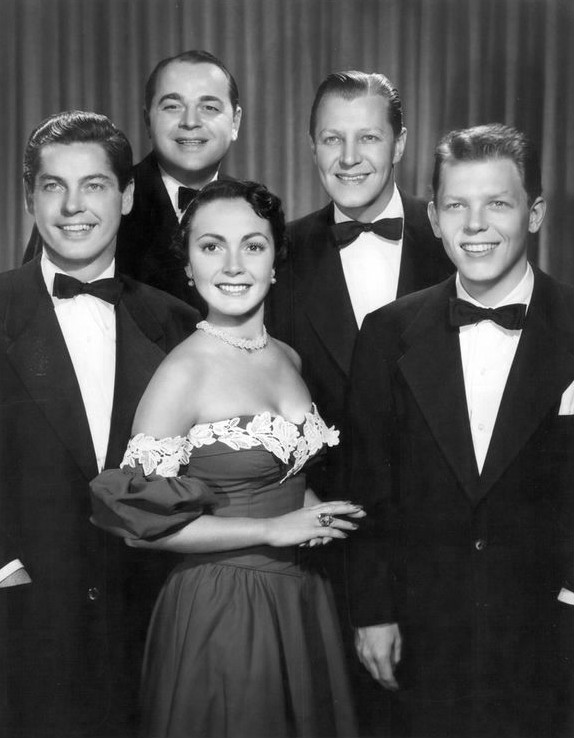
- Kelly and the Modernaires when they were regulars on the CBS radio program Club Fifteen, 1951.
- Born: April 6, 1919; Grove City, Pennsylvania, U.S.
- Died: April 2, 1992 (aged 72); Costa Mesa, California, U.S.
- Occupation: Singer
- Years active: 1939–1978
- Spouse(s): Hal Dickinson (m. 1939; died 1970) Richard Turner (m. 1976)
- Children: 3

Paula Kelly (April 6, 1919 – April 2, 1992) was an American big band singer.

== Early life ==
Kelly was born in Grove City, Pennsylvania, United States. to Dr. Herbert Augustus and Julia Clarice (née Kennedy) Kelly. Kelly started her singing career in her hometown with her two sisters Julia and Martha; following Martha's death in September, 1938 she turned to big time singing.

== Career ==
Kelly sang with orchestras led by Dick Stabile, Artie Shaw, and Al Donahue. In early 1941, she joined Glenn Miller's orchestra, replacing Dorothy Claire and Marion Hutton.

Kelly originally performed solo, but also soon became the female lead of The Modernaires, originally a male trio, then a quartet, resulting in the group becoming a quintet of four male singers and herself. Her first recording with the group was "Perfidia", on which they sang with Dorothy Claire.

In 1942, Glenn Miller went into World War II military service and his band broke up. The Modernaires continued with Kelly as lead singer until 1978, when she retired in favor of her daughter, who performed as Paula Kelly Jr. In the late 1970s, Kelly and The Modernaires kept swing era music alive with their performances in various venues.

== Personal life ==
She married Hal Dickinson, one of the original members of the Modernaires, on December 31, 1939, shortly after joining the group. They had three daughters and remained together until his death on November 18, 1970. In 1976, she married Richard L. Turner to whom she was married until her death. They lived in Laguna Beach. Kelly died at a convalescent home in Costa Mesa, California on April 2, 1992, four days before her 73rd birthday.

== Sources ==
- Flower, John (1972). Moonlight Serenade: a bio-discography of the Glenn Miller Civilian Band. New Rochelle, NY: Arlington House. ISBN 0-87000-161-2.
- Simon, George Thomas (1980). Glenn Miller and His Orchestra. New York: Da Capo paperback. ISBN 0-306-80129-9.
- Schuller, Gunther (1991). The Swing Era, Volume 2: The Development of Jazz, 1930–1945. New York: Oxford University Press. ISBN 0-19-507140-9.
