= Lee Castle =

American jazz trumpeter & bandleader (1915–1990)

- Born: Lee Aniello Castaldo; February 28, 1915
- Died: November 16, 1990 (aged 75)
- Genres: Jazz
- Occupations: Musician; bandleader
- Instrument: Trumpet
- Years active: 1935–1980s
- Formerly of: Joe Haymes band; Artie Shaw band; Tommy Dorsey band

Lee Castle (February 28, 1915 – November 16, 1990) was an American jazz trumpeter and bandleader. He was born Lee Aniello Castaldo and performed under this name early in his career.

== Biography ==
Lee Castle was born on February 28, 1915, in New York City.

His first major professional job was with Joe Haymes in 1935; following this, he worked with Artie Shaw (1936, 1941), Tommy Dorsey (1937–41; also studied under Dorsey's father), Jack Teagarden, Glenn Miller (1939), Will Bradley (1941), and Benny Goodman (1943). He put together his own band in 1938 and continued to lead off and on through the 1940s. He adopted the name Lee Castle in 1942.

In 1953, he returned to duty under Tommy Dorsey and his brother Jimmy Dorsey; after Jimmy's death in 1957, the brothers' band split, and Castle became the leader of the latter's ensemble, remaining in the position until the 1980s.

Castle died of a heart attack on November 16, 1990, at Memorial Hospital in Hollywood, Florida. He was living in Elmsford, New York, at the time, and was survived by his wife, Virginia, and five siblings.
