= Kathleen Lane =

American singer (1916–??)

Kathleen Lane, sometimes billed as Kitty Lane, was an American Big Band singer in the 1930s and 1940s.

== Life and career ==
Kathleen was born in Harrisburg, Pennsylvania in December, 1916. She attended John Harris High School where she was captain of her high school basketball team. "Kitty" was best described as 5 feet of dynamite. Growing up in Harrisburg, she was a swimmer, a diver, played tennis and golf better than most boys, and loved riding horses. Most of all she loved to sing. She said that was the only thing she ever wanted was a career as a jazz singer. As a young child, she sang on the local radio.

After auditioning with allegedly over 100 'girl singers,' she won the praise of Glenn Miller and joined his first band in May of June 1937, as Miller's first female vocalist. She recorded five songs with Miller in November and December; "Sweet Stranger" made Metronome's Best Records list and editor George T. Simon became one of her staunchest supporters.

In May 1937 and before joining Miller's band, she had recorded a number of songs with Charlie Barnet including "Love is a Merry-go-Round," "In Your Own Little Way" and "He Walked Right In."

Miller's group folded due to financial issues and in January 1938, she signed with Isham Jones but did not record with his band. In late October or early November of that year, she joined Bunny Berigan (with husband Jerry Johnson as band manager) and recorded two sides, "I Cried for You" (which reached No. 13 on the record charts) and "'Deed I Do".

A few months later, Lane was appearing with Bob Chester and during the summer of 1939 she recorded seven sides, among them a standout version of "Just For A Thrill". On September 21, 1939, she appeared on Chester's short-lived 25-minute radio show on CBS; the program was archived (along with the rest of Washington, D. C. station WJSV's complete broadcast day) and is still circulated by Old Time Radio collectors and on the internet. She stayed with Chester until October, when Dolores O'Neill became the band's featured attraction.

In early November, Metronome announced that Lane had joined Red Norvo's band, but her stay was brief: in a matter of weeks she was appearing at the Strand Theater in New York with the Bob Crosby Orchestra, possibly as a last-minute substitute for Doris Day. In October 1940, Lane was Bunny Berigan's guest vocalist at the World's Fair in Flushing, New York, singing "Rumboogie" and "A Million Dreams Ago". The following month she auditioned for NBC's "Chamber Music Society of Lower Basin Street" but Dolores O'Neill got the job. In December, Lane was back at the Strand, this time with Woody Herman. Like the Crosby and Norvo gigs, the Strand date with Herman seems to have been a temporary arrangement: Lane did not record with Herman's Herd and apparently retired from the music business in 1941.

== Recordings with Glenn Miller ==
- "My Fine Feathered Friend"
- "Doin' the Jive"
- "Silhouetted In the Moonlight"
- "Every Day’s A Holiday"
- "Sweet Stranger"

== Recordings with Bob Chester ==
- "Just For A Thrill"
- "Shoot The Sherbet To Me, Herbert" (also sang on CBS 9/21/39; see above)
- "You Tell Me Your Dreams and I'll Tell You Mine"
- "Billy"
- "Oo, Oo, Oo, I'm Thrilled"
- "Goodbye, Goodbye"
- "I Can't Tell You Why I Love You, But I Do"

== Recordings with Bunny Berigan ==
- "Patty cake, Patty Cake"
- "Deed I Do"
- "I Cried for You"

== Sources ==
- Charlie Barnet with Stanley Dance. "Those Swinging Years - The Autobiography of Charlie Barnet" foreword by Billy May (1984)
- Walker, Leo. The Big Band Almanac. Da Capo, 1989.
- Simon, George T. The Big Bands. Foreword by Frank Sinatra. Schirmer Books; 4th edition (March 4, 1982).
- Metronome
- Down Beat
