= Cuckoo in the Clock =

Cuckoo in the Clock is a song with lyrics written by Johnny Mercer, and music composed by Walter Donaldson.

A popular version of Cuckoo in the Clock was recorded in 1939 by Kay Kyser & His Orchestra (vocals by Sully Mason) for Brunswick Records (catalog No. 8312).

== Other versions ==
- Mildred Bailey with Red Norvo & His Orchestra, recorded February 8, 1939 for Conqueror Records.
- Benny Goodman - vocal by Johnny Mercer, recorded February 1, 1939 for Victor Records.
- Lena Horne – Lena Like Latin (1963).
- Glenn Miller & His Orchestra – vocal by Marion Hutton, recorded February 6, 1939 for Bluebird Records.
- Toots Thielemans – Time Out for Toots (1958).
- Mel Torme – released on EP in 1956.
