= Conchita Marquita Lolita Pepita Rosita Juanita Lopez =

1942 novelty song

"Conchita Marquita Lolita Pepita Rosita Juanita Lopez" is a 1942 novelty song recorded by the Glenn Miller Orchestra; Bing Crosby with the Vic Schoen Orchestra; Dinah Shore; The Four King Sisters; Tommy Tucker and his Orchestra; and the Royal Air Force Dance Orchestra.

Crosby recorded the song on June 10, 1942, closely followed by the Glenn Miller Orchestra who recorded it on June 17 of that year on Victor Records (catalog 27943A) with vocals by Tex Beneke, Marion Hutton and The Modernaires.

The song, written by Jule Styne with lyrics by Herbert Magidson, tells of the culturally improbable love affair between a "handsome young Irish lad" and his "Mexican beauty." It was featured in the movie Priorities on Parade (1942) when it was performed by Jerry Colonna and Johnnie Johnston.

The Irish lad fell in love with the "rose of Juarez" during a moonlight dance. His first thought during their first kiss was, "New Jersey was never like this!" In a play on the accent prevalent in the northeastern United States, Crosby's version has him humorously pronouncing the name as "New Joisey."

Their marriage and eventual settlement in Hoboken would be a happy one, resulting in thirteen children with both Irish and Spanish names. It also resulted in the unlikely married name of the woman in the title: Conchita Marquita Lolita Pepita Rosita Juanita O'Toole.
