= Johnny McGhee =

American musician

- Born: John Alexander McGhee; October 3, 1905; Philadelphia, Pennsylvania
- Died: July 3, 1978 (aged 72) Huntington, New York
- Genres: Big band, bebop, jazz, popular music
- Occupations: Musician, big band leader
- Instrument: Trumpet
- Years active: 1932–1978

John (Johnny) Alexander McGhee (October 3, 1905 – July 3, 1978) was an American trumpeter and big band leader. He performed with artists including Ella Fitzgerald, The Andrews Sisters, and Louis Armstrong.

== Early life ==
John Alexander McGhee was born October 3, 1905, in Philadelphia, Pennsylvania. His parents, John Charles McGhee (1879–1938) born in Glasgow and Sarah Elizabeth Gough (1881–1944) born in Earlsheaton, Yorkshire before emigrating to America in 1886 and 1885 respectively.

== Early career ==
At 27 he began his musical career. He was acclaimed as one of America's "greatest jazz trumpeters who forsook a career in swing - in favor of playing a sweet, danceable type of music on a muted, swinging cornet." His ability to play was soon discovered and he played with many of the top musicians of the time including: Glen Miller, Benny Goodman, Richard Himber, Vincent Lopez, Russ Morgan, Jan Savitt and many others." He was a featured player in Milt Shaw's Detroiters.

Between 1932 and 1933 he toured with the Smith Ballew Orchestra. In 1933–1935 he worked at WCAU in Philadelphia where he was the first chair of the staff orchestra. In 1934 he was asked to join the Benny Goodman band, but decided against it, as at the time Goodman did not have dedicated air play. He toured with Jan Savitt in 1935. He moved to NYC in 1936 and recorded with many artists including Louis Armstrong in 1938, Lil Armstrong and Her Swing Band, the Andrews Sisters, Ella Fitzgerald, Red Nichols, Glenn Miller, Adrian Rollini, Cozy Cole, Billy Kyle, Jack Teagarden, Richard Himber, Dick Robertson, Nick Travis, and others. He was with the Russ Morgan Essex House Band in New York and the Vincent Lopez Orchestra.

== Pre-war ==
McGhee played at the Strand theatre, NY where he was also the master of ceremonies. "I was scared to death", said Johnny, "I had never spoken to an audience in my life." He then went to work in the Hotel Syracuse where he also had 'air time'. This was recorded in the Glenside News, Pennsylvania. A recent release of Louis Armstrong's Decca Recordings of 1935–46 reveals that Louis was backed by a group of studio performers known as the Decca House Band which included Johnny McGhee on trumpet on songs such as "Naturally" and "I Have a Pocket Full of Dreams."

== War years ==
In 1939 he started his own band, the Johnny McGhee Orchestra. "He gathered about him eleven men who could play what he called...'a sweet, danceable, rhythmic style of music.'" He was labeled as "1940's Number 1 Hot Trumpeter". He was getting lots of coast to coast Radio broadcast time being featured over the NBC network. This listing shows that he played at 9:30pm and it states 'Johnny McGhee's Band, Popular Music'. Nick Kenny, the NY Daily Mirror's radio editor and a popular columnist, wrote "...its amusing and educational to see the way the country's ace songwriters are clamouring for Johnny McGee to introduce their songs. The world has gone trumpet mad, and when Johnny toots an obbligato to a new song on his trumpet the song goes places." George Simon, JAZZ critic at Metronome magazine said "... Johnny McGhee plays more in the style of Bix Beiderbecke than any other trumpeter living." Musical critics hailed him as the "greatest thing since Bix Beiderbecke". Hard times hit the orchestra in 1940 and the Petrillo BMI strike 1942–1944 musicians' strike orchestra leaders were suddenly without music to play ASCAP boycott. During this time Johnny made a series of recordings for Varsity Records; the tracks include: Tiny Old Town, Sierra Sue, Let There Be Love, A Lover's Lullaby and Anitra's Dance. In the 1940s his band played at famous venues, such as the Bermuda Terrace of the St George Hotel in Brooklyn, N.Y. and the Raymore Ballroom in Boston. He was billed as Johnny McGee and his "singing cornet". He also played at the 1940 World's Fair in New York. He was a guest of Duke Ellington's at the Cavalcade of Jazz at the Hurricane in 1943. He played for the service men at Fort Miles for the U.S.O Camp shows to rally the troops. He was even popular with the native American Indians as the Onandaga Indian tribe named him "Ha-Danh-Noh-Tah" which apparently is Indian for "He Blows Horn". He then moved on and replaced Billy Butterfield in a trumpet chair on the Staff at NBC in New York. He loved this job as it had regular hours, good pay and ample time to practise.

Following his career in music, McGhee became a real estate broker and appraiser in Pennsylvania.

== Personal ==
In 1932 he married Mary Katherine Bowden from Chincoteague, Virginia. Following his wife's death, he moved to Berlin, West Germany, to live with his son's family. He then moved with his son's family to Tokyo, Japan, and then to Huntington, New York, where he died.
