= The Lamplighter's Serenade =

Song by Frank Sinatra
- Written: 1942
- Genre: Traditional pop
- Composer: Hoagy Carmichael
- Lyricist: Paul Francis Webster

"The Lamplighter's Serenade" is a song written by Hoagy Carmichael (music) and Paul Francis Webster (lyrics). The construction of the song was unusual and did not conform to the normal AABA pattern. Instead, Carmichael used an ABA format that proved most effective.

== Notable recordings ==
- Frank Sinatra - recorded during his first session as a solo artist, on January 19, 1942 with Axel Stordahl and his Orchestra.
- Bing Crosby also recorded a version of the song on January 26, 1942 with Victor Young and his Orchestra, and this briefly charted reaching the No. 23 spot in the Billboard charts.
- Woody Herman and His Orchestra, recorded January 28, 1942 for Decca Records, (catalog No. 4253A).
- Horace Heidt's Musical Knights, recorded on January 28, 1942 for Columbia Records (catalog No. 36536).
- Glenn Miller and His Orchestra (vocals by Ray Eberle and The Modernaires), recorded February 18, 1942 for Bluebird Records (catalog No. 11474A).
- Michael Holliday - for his album Mike (1962).
