= Lou Mucci =

American jazz musician

Louis Raphael Mucci (December 13, 1909, in Syracuse, New York – January 4, 2000) was an American jazz trumpeter.

Mucci began as a baritone horn player and was appearing in professional settings by the time he was ten years old. As a teenager he switched to trumpet and worked in the late 1930s with Mildred Bailey and Red Norvo before joining Glenn Miller's ensemble in 1938–1939. During World War II he played in the bands of Bob Chester, Hal McIntyre, Claude Thornhill, and Benny Goodman. In the first half of the 1950s he worked as a house musician for CBS and also recorded with Buddy DeFranco and Artie Shaw; later in the decade he worked with Miles Davis, Helen Merrill, and John LaPorta. His association with Davis lasted into the early 1960s; he also played with Kenny Burrell in 1964.
