= Claude R. Lakey =

American jazz musician

Claude Roger Lakey (21 August 1910 Texas - 13 October 1990 Nacogdoches, Texas) was an American saxophonist, trumpeter, and arranger who performed with Joe Rivet, Orrin Tucker, Ben Young, Glenn Miller, Harry James, Frankie Laine, Bobby Sherwood, and Gene Krupa. During World War II, Lakey was a member of several U.S. Army bands. He also directed his own band in 1946. In 1947, Lakey enrolled at the University of North Texas during its inaugural year of first jazz degree program offered in the world. In 1949, at the request of Gene Hall, the jazz program's founding director, Lakey, as student conductor, became the first conductor of the Laboratory Dance Band, the original name of the One O'Clock Lab Band.

After various stints directing youth bands in the Los Angeles suburbs — San Fernando Valley Youth Band and Claudhoppers Youth Band — and running his own music retail store, Lakey founded (circa 1963) Claude Lakey Mouthpieces, Inc., maker of woodwind mouthpieces. In 1990, he sold the company to Nicholas D. Bogden, former general manager of Rumbo Recorders, a three studio audio recording facility located in Los Angeles, who moved it from Nacogdoches, Texas, to Redmond, Washington and operates the company under its original name.

== CLM Inc. ==
Being a jazz musician himself, and after working with many other jazz artists, Claude realized there wasn't a saxophone mouthpiece available that met his standards and standards that many other artists had been looking for. He began taking blanks and making changes to suit his requirements. Once satisfied with his design, he found an adequate mold maker and began selling his finished product in the back corner of C&D Music Company.

The mouthpiece business quickly grew, so Claude decided to sell C&D Music Company to Nick Bogden and just focus on his new business venture. He moved the business back to Nacogdoches, Texas where he continued to sell to individual artists as well as a few distributors in the U.S..

Nick Bogden helped build Rumbo Recorders (owned by "The Capitan and Tennille") in Canoga Park, Ca. and was the studio manager. Nick recorded and worked with Tom Petty, Stevie Nicks, Bob Seager, Survivor, Super Tramp, Survivor(Eye Of The Tiger), The Beach Boys, Guns & Roses, and many other artists during the great period of Rumbo Recorders.

In the early 1990s, Claude wanted to retire and sell his business to someone he trusted to use the same care in handcrafting mouthpieces and carry on his legacy. He called Nick to see if he would be interested in buying the business. Nick agreed and flew to Texas to learn how Claude Lakey Mouthpieces were made. During the process of selling the company, Claude was diagnosed with cancer and died one month later at the age of 80. Nick completed the sale through the estate and moved the business to Redmond, Washington.

Claude Lakey Mouthpieces has four major distributors in the US, and distributors in over 20 countries world wide. In 2013 the company celebrated "50 years of jazz" with new products being introduced.

== Family ==
Marriages

- In the mid 1930s, Claude was married to the big band singer Bonnie Baker, the stage name for Evelyn Reyo Lakey (née Nelson; 1917–1990). They divorced December 1936 in Houston.
- On November 13, 1937, Claude married Martha Elizabeth Kuula (1917–1944) in Ashtabula, Ohio.
- He then married Norma Dee (1919–2004)
