= Warren Smith (jazz trombonist) =

American jazz musician

- Born: May 17, 1908; Middlebourne, West Virginia, U.S.
- Died: August 28, 1975 (aged 67); Santa Barbara, California, U.S.
- Genres: Jazz
- Instruments: Trumpet

Warren Smith (May 17, 1908 – August 28, 1975) was an American jazz trombonist.

== Early life ==
Smith played piano from age seven, and learned cornet and saxophone before settling on trombone.

== Career ==
Smith started out in the territory band Harrison's Texans in the 1920s, then followed with an extended run in Abe Lyman's employ in the 1930s. He worked with Bob Crosby late in the 1940s before returning to work with Lyman briefly. Moving to Chicago, he worked with Bud Jacobson and Bob Scobey, then worked on the West Coast with Jess Stacy and Lu Watters. In 1955, he toured with Duke Ellington, then played with Joe Darensbourg from 1957 to 1960. In the 1960s, he worked with Wild Bill Davison and Red Nichols.
