= Babe Russin =

American jazz musician

Irving "Babe" Russin (June 18, 1911 – August 4, 1984) was an American tenor saxophone player.

== Career ==
Born in Pittsburgh, Pennsylvania, Russin played with some of the best known jazz bands of the 1930s and 1940s, including Benny Goodman, Tommy Dorsey and Glenn Miller. He led his own band briefly in the early 1940s. He solos in the recording the Glenn Miller band made of Jerry Gray's composition, "A String of Pearls" for Bluebird Records in 1941. In 1950, Russin was credited as a musician with the backup band on two Frank Sinatra songs for Columbia Records, "Should I?" and "You Do Something To Me". He co-wrote the instrumental "All the Things You Ain't" with Jimmy Dorsey which was released as a V-Disc 78 single, No. 391B, in March, 1945. He appeared briefly in the Universal-International movie The Glenn Miller Story (1954).

Russin plays on the soundtrack to the Warner Bros. movie A Star Is Born (1954), playing "Cheating on Me" with a small group. He also appeared in the Universal-International movie The Benny Goodman Story (1956).

== Discography ==
With Jack Hoffman

- "Stop the Music", with Jack Hoffman 1948

With Georgie Auld

- In the Land of Hi-Fi with Georgie Auld and His Orchestra (EmArcy, 1955)

With Sammy Davis Jr

- It's All Over but the Swingin' (Decca, 1957)
