= Dorothy Claire =

American singer, actress, and radio personality (1920–1982)

- Claire in 1947
- Born: Marietta Wright; June 5, 1920; La Porte, Indiana, U.S.
- Died: September 4, 1982 (aged 62); La Porte, Indiana, U.S.
- Other name: Dorothy Carls
- Occupations: Singer, actress, radio personality
- Years active: 1936–1970

Dorothy Claire (born Marietta Wright, June 5, 1920 – September 4, 1982) was an American singer, actress and radio personality.

== Early years ==
The daughter of Mr. and Mrs. Nelson Wright, Claire was born in La Porte, Indiana on June 5, 1920. At age 4, she began singing, joining her sisters to form a trio that performed at parties and on WSBT radio in South Bend, Indiana. She later attended La Porte High School, where she was a cheerleader.

== Career ==
Orchestra leader Ayars Lamar hired Claire as a singer when she was 16, changing her name from Marietta Wright to Dorothy Claire. Two of her sisters later adopted that last name for their own professional work. She debuted professionally when she appeared with Lamar's orchestra in Indianapolis at the Indiana Roof. She went on to sing for notable band leaders including Glenn Miller, Tommy Dorsey, Sonny Dunham, and Bob Crosby. Her rendition of "Perfidia" with Miller's orchestra sold more than 1 million records.

Breaking away from orchestras, Claire began singing in night clubs in Chicago, including Chez Paree and The Palmer House, then performed at the Copacabana in New York. She sang on Bing Crosby's radio program and on Don McNeill's Breakfast Club. She also had her own program on radio station WJZ in New York City and toured in vaudeville. Her work on television included appearances with Jack Carter and Paul Winchell.

On Broadway, Claire performed in Face the Music (1932), Finian's Rainbow (1947) and Jimmy (1969).

== Later life and death ==
Claire returned to La Porte and resided there in the last few years of her life. She died there on September 4, 1982, at the age of 62. At the time of her death, Claire was legally known as Dorothy Carls, and was a widow.
