= Doc Goldberg =

American jazz bassist

- Born: Edward Goldberg
- Genres: Jazz
- Occupation: Musician
- Instrument: Double bass
- Formerly of: Glenn Miller Orchestra; George Hall Orchestra; Will Bradley Trio; George Paxton and His Orchestra

Edward "Doc" Goldberg was an American jazz bassist. He played in the Glenn Miller Orchestra and the Will Bradley Trio, alongside pianist Freddie Slack and drummer Ray McKinley. Before that, he played in George Hall's orchestra. He also played bass for George Paxton and His Orchestra.

Bassist and photographer Milt Hinton may also have used the name "Doc Goldberg" as a pseudonym.

Goldberg is deceased.
