= Zeke Zarchy =

American jazz trumpeter

- Zarchy (right) and Louis Armstrong in the late 1960s

Background information
- Birth name: Rubin Zarchy
- Born: June 12, 1915; New York City, New York
- Died: April 11, 2009 (aged 93); Irvine, California
- Genres: Big band; Swing; Jazz
- Occupation: Musician
- Instrument: Trumpet

Rubin "Zeke" Zarchy (June 12, 1915 – April 11, 2009) was an American lead trumpet player of the big band and swing eras.

== Early life ==
Zarchy was born in New York City on June 12, 1915. He first learned the violin, "but after a stint as bugler with his Boy Scout troop he switched permanently to trumpet while in his early teens."

== Later life and career ==
Zarchy was with the Joe Haymes orchestra in 1935, and the following year played with Haymes, then Benny Goodman, and then Artie Shaw. He was then with Bob Crosby and Red Norvo (1937–39), Tommy Dorsey (1939–40), and Glenn Miller (1940).

Between 1942 and 1945 he played in US Army bands: he was part of what became Miller's Army Air Force Band (officially, the 418th Army Band), playing lead trumpet as Master (First) Sergeant. Zarchy's trumpet can be heard on recordings as Benny Goodman's "Bugle Call Rag", Glenn Miller's "Moonlight Cocktail", and Bob Crosby's "South Rampart Street Parade".

After the war, singer Frank Sinatra invited Zarchy to move to Los Angeles, where he became a first-call studio musician. He played on numerous recordings, including those led by Boyd Raeburn, Jerry Gray, Sarah Vaughan, and Frank Capp. He appeared on film in The Glenn Miller Story (1954).

During the 1960s and 1970s, he played in the house bands of several CBS TV variety shows, including The Smothers Brothers Comedy Hour, The Danny Kaye Show and The Jonathan Winters Show, and was a member of the NBC Staff Orchestras in New York and Los Angeles.

In his later years, Zarchy made many music tours of Europe, South America, and Australia, as well as thirty-two concert trips to Japan. He tutored several young trumpet players who became successful performers and studio musicians. He died in Irvine, California, on April 11, 2009.
