= Here We Go Again (Glenn Miller song) =

- 1944 RCA Victor 78 single, 20-1563-A.

Single by Glenn Miller
- A-side: "Here We Go Again"
- B-side: "Long Time No See, Baby"
- Released: 1944
- Genre: Swing, jazz
- Label: RCA
- Songwriter(s): Jerry Gray

"Here We Go Again" is a swing jazz instrumental recorded by Glenn Miller. The song was released as a 78 single. It was Glenn Miller's last Top 40 hit during his lifetime, peaking at #25.

== Background ==
"Here We Go Again" was composed by Jerry Gray, the arranger in the Glenn Miller Orchestra. Glenn Miller and His Orchestra released the song as an RCA Victor 78 single, 20-1563-A, backed with "Long Time No See, Baby", words and music by Jack Lathrop and Sunny Skylar. The recording reached no. 25 on the Billboard pop singles chart in April, 1944 in a one-week chart run. The song was also performed by Glenn Miller with the Army Air Force Band.

The instrumental was recorded at Victor Studios in Chicago on Tuesday, July 14, 1942.

This instrumental was part of the last recording session by the Glenn Miller civilian band due to the dispute between the American Federation of Musicians and the recording companies. A ban on recording was imposed by the Union on its members on August 1, 1942, known as the James Petrillo ban, after the head of the union, that continued until November 22, 1944, for RCA Victor and Columbia. Decca and several other new companies began recording in October 1943. The instrumental would not be released until 1944.

"Here We Go Again" was the last Top 40 hit that Glenn Miller had during his lifetime.

1943 sheet music cover, Mutual Music Society, New York.

A V-Disc test pressing of the song was made by the U.S. War Department as VP 1311 – D5TC 274 using a recording from April 29, 1944.

The recording was reviewed in the March 11, 1944 issue of Billboard, in the Popular Record Reviews section: "A 16-bar derivative of riff origination, the Miller men make it serve for swell jump music to keep the fans merry."

== Personnel ==
On trombones: Glenn Miller, Jimmy Priddy, Paul Tanner, Frank D’Annolfo. On trumpets: Billy May, Steve Lipkins, Dale McMickle, Johnny Best. On reeds: Lloyd “Skippy” Martin, as; Ernie Caceres, as, bar & clt; Wilbur Schwartz, clt & as; Tex Beneke, ts; Al Klink, ts. Rhythm: Chummy MacGregor, p; Bobby Hackett, g; Doc Goldberg, b; and, Maurice Purtill, d.

== Album appearances ==
The song appears on the following Glenn Miller albums:

- The Glenn Miller Story, Vol. 2, RCA, 1990
- Glenn Miller and the Army Air Force Band: Rare Broadcast Performances From 1943 to 1944, Laserlight, 1990
- Glenn Miller Live at the Hollywood Palladium: Giants of Jazz, Giants of Jazz Recordings/Saar, 1995
- Missing Chapters, Vol. 5: The Complete Abbey Road Recordings, Avid, 1996
- The Lost Recordings, #1, Conifer, 1996
- Red Cavalry March, Vol. 4, Avid, 1996
- Secret Broadcasts, RCA, 1996
- The 100 Greatest Titles, EMI Music Distribution/Parlophone, 2001
- The Essential Glenn Miller: Best of Army & Civilian Bands, Metro, 2002
- The Real ... Glenn Miller: The Ultimate Glenn Miller Collection, RCA Victor, 2013
