= Maurice Purtill =

American jazz drummer (1916–1994)

- Purtill in 1941

Background information
- Born: May 4, 1916; Huntington, New York, U.S.
- Died: March 9, 1994 (aged 77) Ridgewood, New Jersey, U.S.
- Genres: Jazz
- Occupation: Musician
- Instrument: Drums
- Years active: 1936–1978
- Formerly of: Glenn Miller Orchestra

Maurice "Moe" Purtill (May 4, 1916 – March 9, 1994), was an American swing jazz drummer, best known as the drummer for the Glenn Miller Orchestra from 1939 to 1942.

== Career ==
Born in Huntington, New York, Purtill dropped out of high school and started his career as a freelance drummer in New York Studios. At the age of 20, he was with the band of Red Norvo at the beginning of 1936. Later he joined Mildred Bailey. He played briefly with Miller in 1937, then worked with Tommy Dorsey in 1938-39 before picking up with Miller again from 1939-1942, when Miller had the bulk of his hits. After the breakup of Miller's band in 1942, Purtill played with Kay Kyser until 1944, then joined the U.S. Navy. After his discharge, he played briefly in 1946 with the reformed Glenn Miller Orchestra directed by Tex Beneke.

Purtill went on to record in the studio on various projects. He participated in a few Miller reunions, although he did not like to discuss his time in the band. He was good friends with Buddy Rich, Trigger Alpert and saxophonist Jack Palmer. Purtill lived in New York City until the early 1970s when he moved to Sarasota, Florida. Moe Purtill retired in 1978. He died at Valley Hospital in Ridgewood, New Jersey.

== Movie appearances ==
Moe Purtill appeared in the following movies in 1941–1942:

- Sun Valley Serenade (1941)
- Orchestra Wives (1942)
