= Johnny Best =

American jazz trumpeter (1913–2003)

- Best in 1941

Background information
- Born: Johnny McClanian Best, Jr. October 20, 1913; Shelby, North Carolina, US
- Died: September 19, 2003 (aged 89)
- Genres: Jazz
- Instrument: Trumpet
- Years active: 1930s–1980s
- Formerly of: The Glenn Miller Orchestra

Johnny McClanian Best, Jr. (October 20, 1913, Shelby, North Carolina – September 19, 2003) was an American jazz trumpeter.

== Background ==
Best played piano as a child and learned trumpet from age 13. He worked in the 1930s with Les Brown, Charlie Barnet, and Artie Shaw (1937–39), then joined Glenn Miller's orchestra from 1939 to 1942. He spent a short time with Bob Crosby before serving in the Navy during World War II as a lifeguard, playing in Shaw's military band in 1942-43 and Sam Donahue's in 1944-45. Following a stint with Benny Goodman in 1945-46, he relocated to Hollywood, where he worked with Crosby again on radio from 1946 to 1951 and played in many studio big bands in the 1940s and 1950s. He did a tour with Billy May in 1953, and led his own group locally later in the decade. His trumpet can be heard along with Ella Fitzgerald on her album Get Happy. In 1964 he toured Japan with Crosby, and joined Ray Conniff for worldwide tours in the 1970s. In 1982, he broke his back while working in his avocado orchard and used a wheelchair late in life, but was active into the 1980s.

He played the trumpet solo on the Glenn Miller recording of "At Last", which was featured in the film Orchestra Wives, lip-synched by George Montgomery on screen.

Billy May recalled: "He had a good sound on the instrument. Playing the trumpet can be an endurance contest with your lip, and Johnny had command. He played on 'Begin the Beguin (sic),' which put Artie Shaw in business."
