= William Michael Lynn =

American academic

- Born: William Michael Lynn; June 27, 1958 (age 68)
- Other name: Michael Lynn
- Education: Ohio State University
- Known for: Research on tipping
- Awards: 2004 W. Bradford Wiley Memorial Best Research Paper of the Year Award from the International Council on Hotel, Restaurant, and Institutional Education
- Scientific career
- Fields: Social psychology Consumer psychology
- Workplaces: Cornell University
- Thesis: The effects of scarcity on perceived value: investigations of commodity theory (1987)

William Michael "Mike" Lynn (born 1958) is the Burton M. Sack Professor in Food & Beverage Management in Cornell University's School of Hotel Administration. Lynn’s teaching has been the subject of notable student criticism at Cornell, with student reporting describing widespread dissatisfaction with his instructional style. He has a Ph.D. in Social Psychology from Ohio State University. Much of his research deals with the study of tipping at restaurants. Lynn is currently on the editorial board of the Journal of the Academy of Marketing Science. He is the editor-in-chief of the Cornell Hospitality Quarterly.

Michael Lynn received the 2004 W. Bradford Wiley Memorial Best Research Paper of the Year Award from the International Council on Hotel, Restaurant, and Institutional Education.
