= Ralph Hitz =

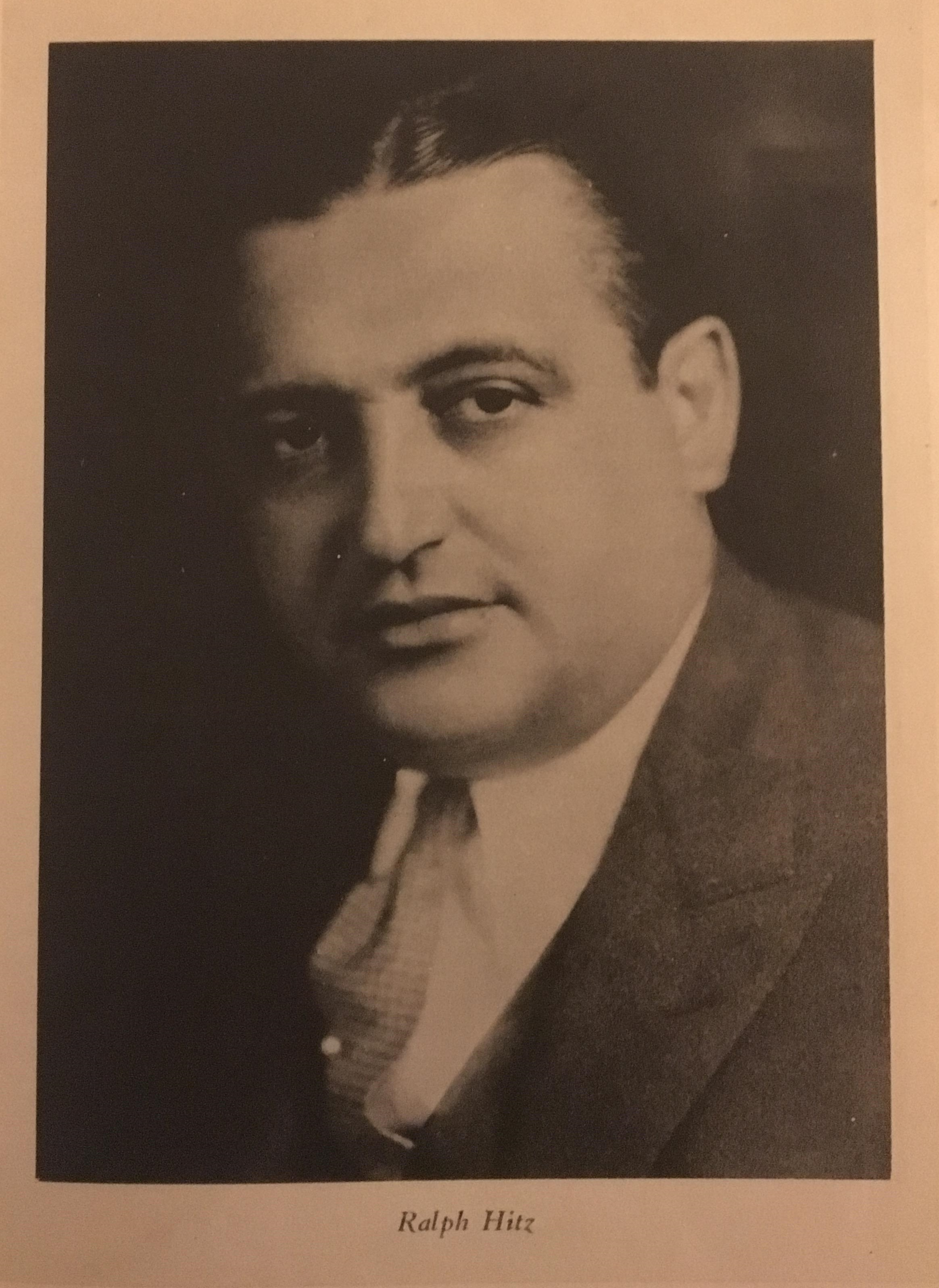
- Ralph Hitz pictured in Eminent Americans 1936
- Born: 1 March 1891; Vienna, Austro-Hungarian Empire
- Died: 12 January 1940 (aged 48); New York City, New York, United States

Ralph Hitz (1 March 1891 - 12 January 1940) was a pioneer in the hotel industry, whose ideas for marketing and customer service became the industry standard for luxury lodging. During the 1930s he was the head of the National Hotel Management Company, the largest hotel organization in the United States at the time.

== Early life ==
Born in Vienna, Austria, on 1 March 1891, into a Jewish family, Hitz started his career as an elevator boy at the Hotel Sacher in Vienna when he was fourteen after he ran away from school. His family eventually found him and returned him to school as his father wanted him to be an architect. However, on a family trip to the United States he ran away from home three days after his family arrived in New York in 1906. He made his way to New Mexico and started as a busboy at a small hotel in Lumberton. He spent the next nine years working in restaurants and hotels around the nation, then got into hotel management. He was first made a hotel manager in 1926 at the Fenway Hall Hotel in Cleveland, Ohio. In 1927, Hitz was made the manager of Cincinnati's Hotel Gibson, and within two years, he had more than tripled the hotel's net income.

== Hotel New Yorker and the National Hotel Management Company ==
When the 2,500 room New Yorker Hotel prepared to open, Hitz was hired to manage the new venture, which opened on January 2, 1930, weeks after the stock market crash. Hitz's ability to turn a profit during the depression led the hotel's mortgage holder, Manufacturers Trust Company, to hiring him to control all of its hotels. In 1932, the National Hotel Management Company(NMH) was created, with Hitz as the NHM president. By the time of Hitz's death at 48, the NHM managed the New Yorker, the Lexington and the Belmont Plaza hotels (New York); the Congress Hotel(Chicago); the Netherland Plaza(Cincinnati); Adolphus Hotel (Dallas); the Hotel Van Cleve (Dayton); the Book-Cadillac (Detroit); the Nicollet Hotel(Minneapolis); The New York Municipal Airport Restaurants (New York) and the Eastern Slope Inn (North Conway, New Hampshire).

== Innovation ==
In 1936 Hitz published The Standard Practice Manuals for Hotel Operation, which covered every aspect of what he believed needed to be done in order to operate a hotel successfully. Hitz was the first manager to create a customer database. In the days before computers, Hitz maintained file cabinets with information on the preferences of thousands of guests. Among the uses of the data were to order the newspapers from a guest's hometown, to be delivered to their rooms. Hitz tracked information about annual conventions for 3,000 organizations, and sent weekly bulletins to each of his hotels, and lobbied to have conventions booked in the cities where the NHM hotels were located. Hitz recognized the importance of keeping his employees happy, and paid competitive wages, sent gifts on special occasions, and protected the jobs of any employee with at least five years of service. However, Hitz's greatest strength was in the services provided to his guests. His motto was "Give the customer value and you will get volume sales in return."

Another Hitz idea was a closed-circuit radio system, similar to the in-house television channels in modern hotels, to advertise services in each of his hotels. A guest would need only to switch on the radio to learn about the evening's scheduled entertainment and the day's menus. At the hotel dining rooms, Hitz hired a special chef (called a "Tony") to make café diablo and Crêpes Suzette, and to sell the treat for an affordable 50 cents.

== Death ==
Hitz became ill towards the end of 1939 due to a liver ailment and died of a heart attack at the Post Graduate Hospital in New York City on January 12, 1940, at the age of 48. His funeral was held at the Universal Chapel before a gathering of hundreds of mourners. He was cremated and interred at Fresh Pond Crematory on Long Island, New York.

The National Hotel Management Company that he had helped form was dissolved within a month of his death.

== Family ==
Hitz had married Myrtle Dahl in Michigan in 1915 and they had a son Ralph Hitz Jr., who was born in Cleveland, Ohio in 1925. Hitz Jr. would go on to become a respected hotel manager in his own right. Hitz was also stepfather to Louise Hitz, an entertainer and figure skater who married singer Buddy Clark in 1935.

== Legacy ==
The Ralph Hitz Memorial Scholarship, to support undergraduate students studying Hotel administration, was established on 1 April 1941 by Hotel Ezra Cornell at the Cornell University School of Hotel Administration. It is maintained to this day.

== Sources ==
- Current Biography 1940, pp389–90
- Philip Kotler, John Bowen and James Makens, Marketing for Hospitality and Tourism, 3d.Ed.', Prentice Hall 2006
- "Bitter Boniface", TIME, Dec. 13, 1937
- "You Can't Sell Peanuts at the End of the Parade" by Jerome Beatty, The American Magazine, November issue, 1932 at page 22.
- "Eminent Americans 1936" by C.W. Taylor, page 79
