= Congress Plaza Hotel =

Hotel in Chicago, Illinois

Coordinates: 41.8754°N 87.6245°W

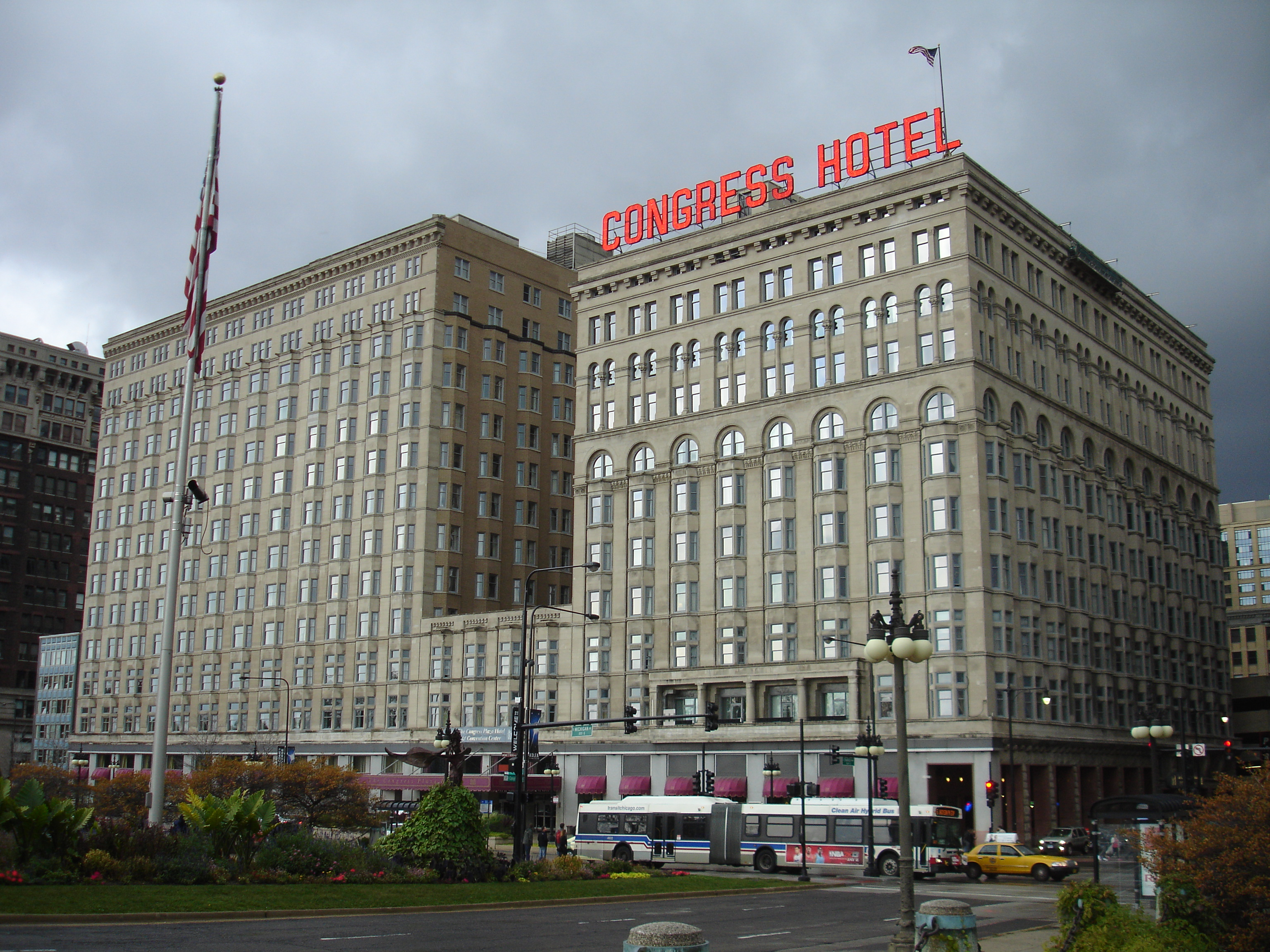
- Congress Plaza Hotel, October 2012
- Former names: Auditorium Annex; Congress Hotel

General information
- Location: 520 S Michigan Ave, Chicago, IL 60605
- Opened: 1893; 133 years ago

Design and construction
- Architects: Clinton J. Warren; Holabird & Roche

The Congress Plaza Hotel is a hotel on Michigan Avenue in Chicago, across from Grant Park. Opened by R.H. Southgate just before the 1893 World’s Fair, the hotel has hosted numerous US Presidents and a wide range of political and cultural events. The hotel is frequently claimed to be one of the most haunted buildings in Chicago.

The hotel is not currently affiliated with any national chain. Since 2012 it has been owned by a joint venture of New York investment firms.

== History ==
When its north tower opened in 1893, the hotel was named the Auditorium Annex per its intended usage as an annex to the Auditorium Building across the street. Designed by architect Clinton J. Warren, the north tower was linked to the Auditorium building by a marble-lined underground passage called Peacock Alley.

After the World's Columbian Exposition, the hotel underwent two major expansions and renovations, first in 1902 and then again in 1907, which brought the total complex up to 1 million square feet (93,000 m^{2}). The design and construction of these two additions, including the south tower, were overseen by the firm of Holabird & Roche. The hotel now features 871 guest rooms and suites.

The hotel changed its name to the Congress Hotel by 1908.

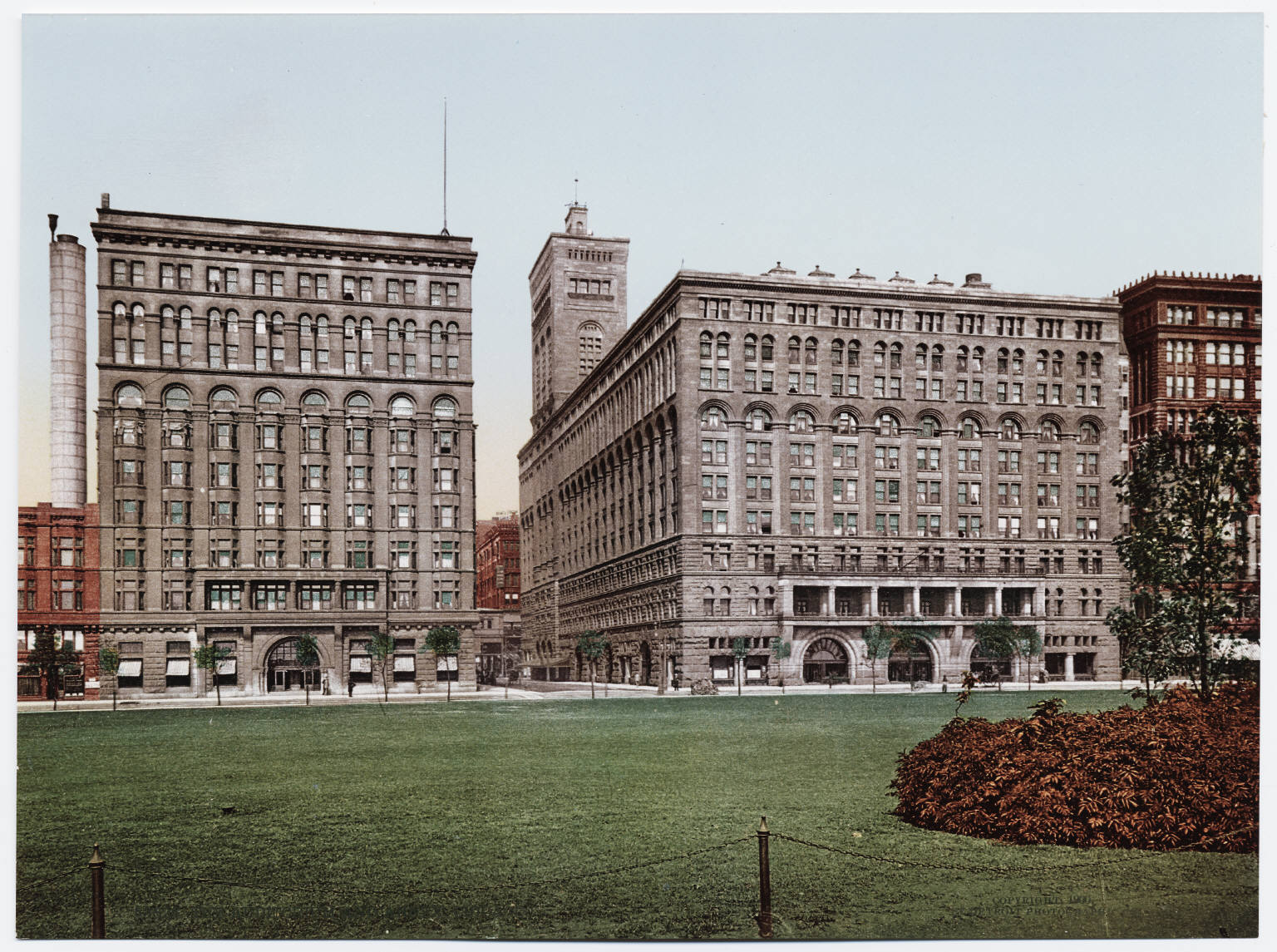
Congress Hotel and Auditorium Building as seen from Grant Park circa 1897.

Through the 1930s the hotel was run by hotel industry pioneer Ralph Hitz's National Hotel Management Company. At this same time, part of the hotel was used as the location for a Benny Goodman NBC Radio Show.

In 1939, tragedy befell the hotel when guest Adele Langer leapt from a thirteenth floor window with her sons, killing all three. The Langer family were Jewish refugees who had fled Nazi-occupied Czechoslovakia. Fearing her family would be deported, Adele chose suicide rather than risk death at the hands of the Nazis.

Following the outbreak of World War II, the Government purchased the hotel and used it as a training school for U.S. Army Air Forces. It reopened for civilian use in time for the summer political conventions of 1944. At this time, John J. Mack was president of the Michigan-Congress Hotel Corporation.

In 1950, the Pick Hotel Corporation bought the hotel and oversaw a major renovation of the entire hotel, which included new suites and restaurants. Another modernization project began in the 1960s, which added a ballroom and escalators.

From 1987 until 2012, the hotel was owned by a group of investors led by Israeli businessman Albert Nasser. In 2012, it was sold to a joint venture of New York investment firms.

On 15 June 2003, about 130 members of UNITE HERE Local 1 went on strike to protest a proposed seven percent wage cut. On 16 June 2007, Barack Obama, then running for the presidency, briefly stood by the picket line and promised to return as president, but he did not. The strike, one of the world's longest, ended May 30, 2013 after nearly 10 years. No concessions were given by management.

== Hosting Presidents and Major Events ==
Over the years the Congress has welcomed many presidents as well as hosted major events. Presidents who have stayed at or visited the Congress include Grover Cleveland, William McKinley, Teddy Roosevelt, William Howard Taft, Woodrow Wilson, Warren Harding, Calvin Coolidge, and Franklin Roosevelt.

In June, 1912, Theodore Roosevelt stayed at the Congress Plaza when the 1912 Republican National Convention was held in Chicago. Roosevelt, who at that time was seeking the Republican nomination for President, spoke from the balcony of his room at the hotel to a crowd assembled across the street in Grant Park.

In October 1916, US President Woodrow Wilson passed the hotel as part of his visit to the city. Over a hundred protestors from the National Women's Party demonstrated in favor of women's suffrage with a silent protest. Holding banners such as "Wilson is Against Women," the demonstrators were attacked by a mob and their banners destroyed while police looked on and, in some cases, laughed, according to newspaper reports.

Events that have been held at the hotel include the 1963 Prohibition Party National Convention on August 23, 1963.

The hotel has hosted International Mr. Leather guests and festivities every Memorial Day weekend since 2015 (though the contest itself has often been held elsewhere).

== Murals ==
Taos Society of Artists painter, E. Martin Hennings painted the ceiling murals inside the Florentine Room around 1918.

In 1940, Louis Grell (1887–1960), a Chicago-based artist, was commissioned to paint thirteen murals for the lunettes that are an architectural feature surrounding the grand lobby. The murals were various popular scenes around Chicago at the time. Under the Albert Pick Jr ownership in 1952, Grell was again commissioned to paint the same architectural lunettes, this time Grell incorporated Chicago figures into the scenes depicting important trades significant to Chicago's growth and symbolism. Lady Liberty was found in one mural holding the Chicago River "Y" on her lap. Additionally, in 1955 Pick commissioned Grell once again, during one of the many renovations, to paint three walls for the newly decorated Pompeian Room which also had a magnificent Louis Comfort Tiffany glass fountain in the center of the vast room. Today glass covers the thirteen lunettes where the murals could be hiding. Grell also painted a large white Peacock that was mounted above the bar next to Peacock Alley. Each wall had a main central Greek/Roman mural, however, Grell decorated the entire wall with various patterns of flora and custom design.
