= Nicollet Hotel =

- Formerly listed on the U.S. National Register of Historic Places
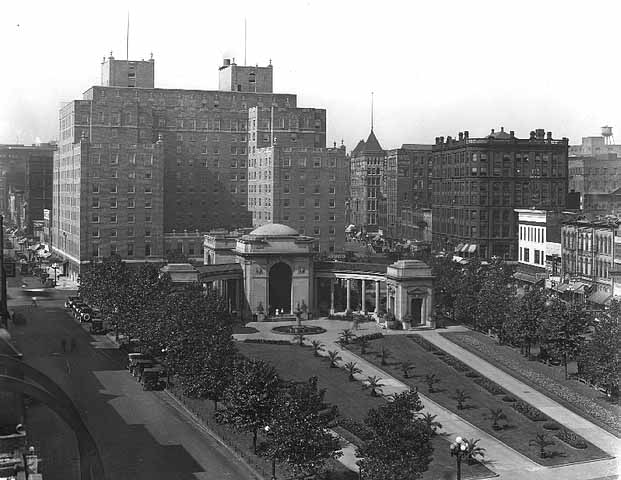
- Nicollet Hotel exterior, 1924

- Location within Minnesota
- Location: 235 Hennepin Ave South
- Coordinates: 44°58′55″N 93°16′7″W
- Built: 1924
- NRHP reference No.: 87002008

Significant dates
- Added to NRHP: November 16, 1987
- Removed from NRHP: March 15, 1993

The Nicollet Hotel, in downtown Minneapolis, was located on a slightly irregular block bounded by Hennepin Avenue, Washington Avenue, Nicollet Avenue and 3rd Street South adjacent to Gateway Park.

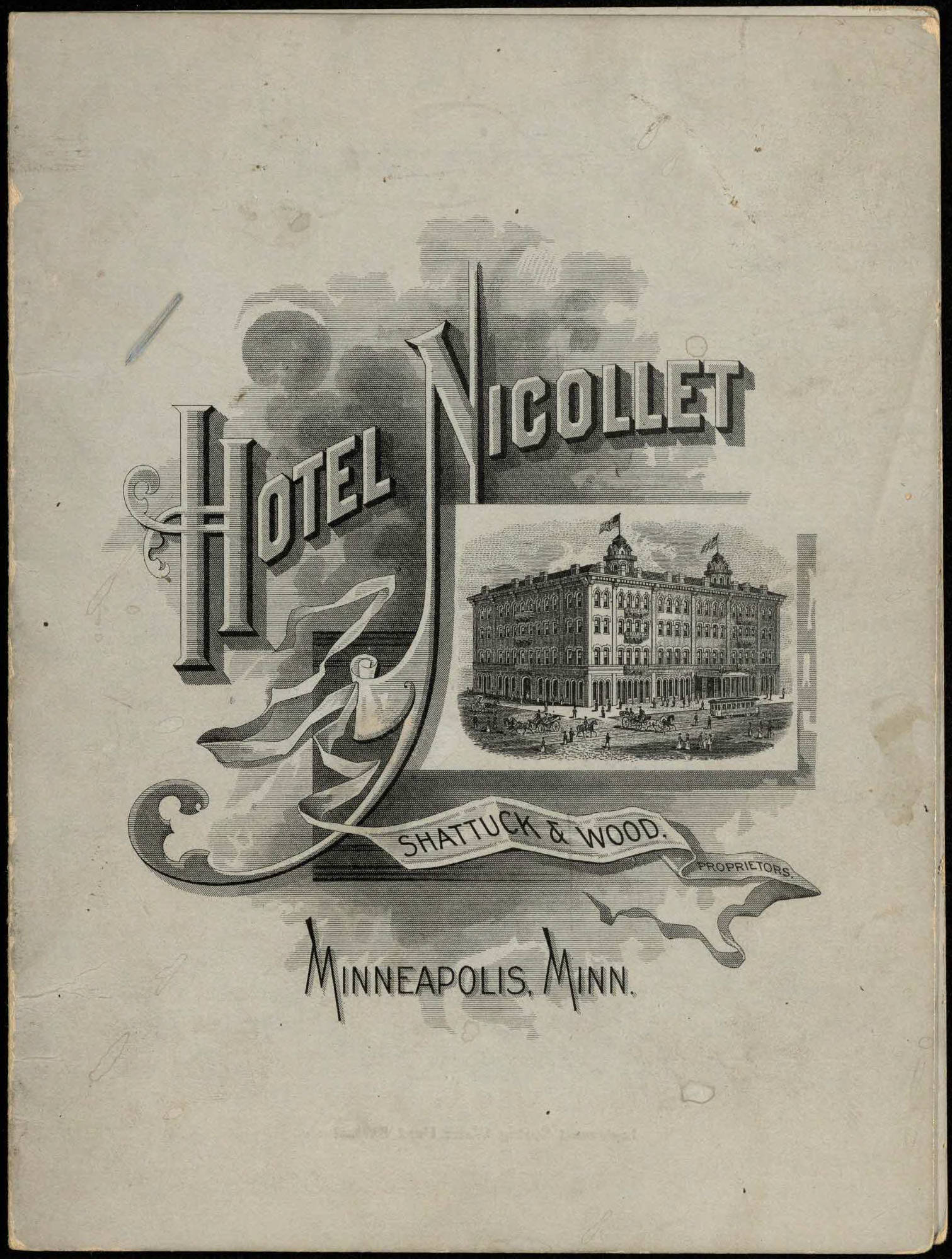
Menu from the 1858 Nicollet Hotel with illustration of the original building and the proprietors' names.

The original hotel on the site (often called the Nicollet House Hotel) was built in 1858. Named after Joseph Nicollet, the hotel quickly became a landmark and many of the city's early prominent figures such as John S. Pillsbury and William D. Washburn worked out of it. Over the next half-century it was expanded and remodeled several times, but by the 1920s found itself obsolete. In 1922 city inspectors ordered the installation of a fire sprinkler system which the owners deemed too expensive. The old hotel was demolished in 1923.

The new Nicollet Hotel opened in June 1924. Costing $3.5 million, it had a total of 637 rooms spread across 12 stories. The building was designed by the Chicago-based firm of Holabird & Roche in a somewhat plain and unadorned style with four wings of rooms arranged around a central core. The building also had space for retail storefronts at street level.

While somewhat unremarkable in appearance, the hotel's sheer size and entertainment venues made it a popular option. A young John F. Kennedy had been there as well as Dwight Eisenhower, Harry Truman, Eleanor Roosevelt, and Judy Garland. One of the hotel's lounges, the Minnesota Terrace, hosted musicians such as Glenn Miller, Artie Shaw, Tommy Dorsey, Gene Krupa and Lawrence Welk.

In the 1930s the Nicollet was managed by the National Hotel Management Company, with hotel industry pioneer Ralph Hitz as the NHM president. Hitz raised the profile of the Nicollet with his unique marketing style and particular attention to his guests and employees. In the 1950s a Polynesian-themed bar called the Waikiki Room was also added. In 1957 the hotel was bought by the Albert Pick Hotels Company and renamed the Pick-Nicollet Hotel.

During the 1960s when much of the Gateway District was demolished as part of an urban renewal project the Nicollet was spared, however the hotel's age and the neighborhood's decline left it unable to compete. In 1973 the hotel was bought by Soul's Harbor Church which held services, operated Calvary Bible Institute, and provided housing in the building. The church went into bankruptcy in 1984 and the hotel's fixtures and furnishings were sold off shortly thereafter. Various proposals to renovate the building into a new hotel, apartments or office space were made during the 1980s but none of the plans came to fruition. The building was added to the National Register of Historic Places in 1987 but was eventually demolished in 1991.

After the building's demolition the site served as a surface parking lot until construction began on the RBC Gateway building in June 2019. Today, the former Nicollet Hotel site houses not only the world headquarters of RBC Wealth Management, but also a Four Seasons hotel.

== Gallery ==
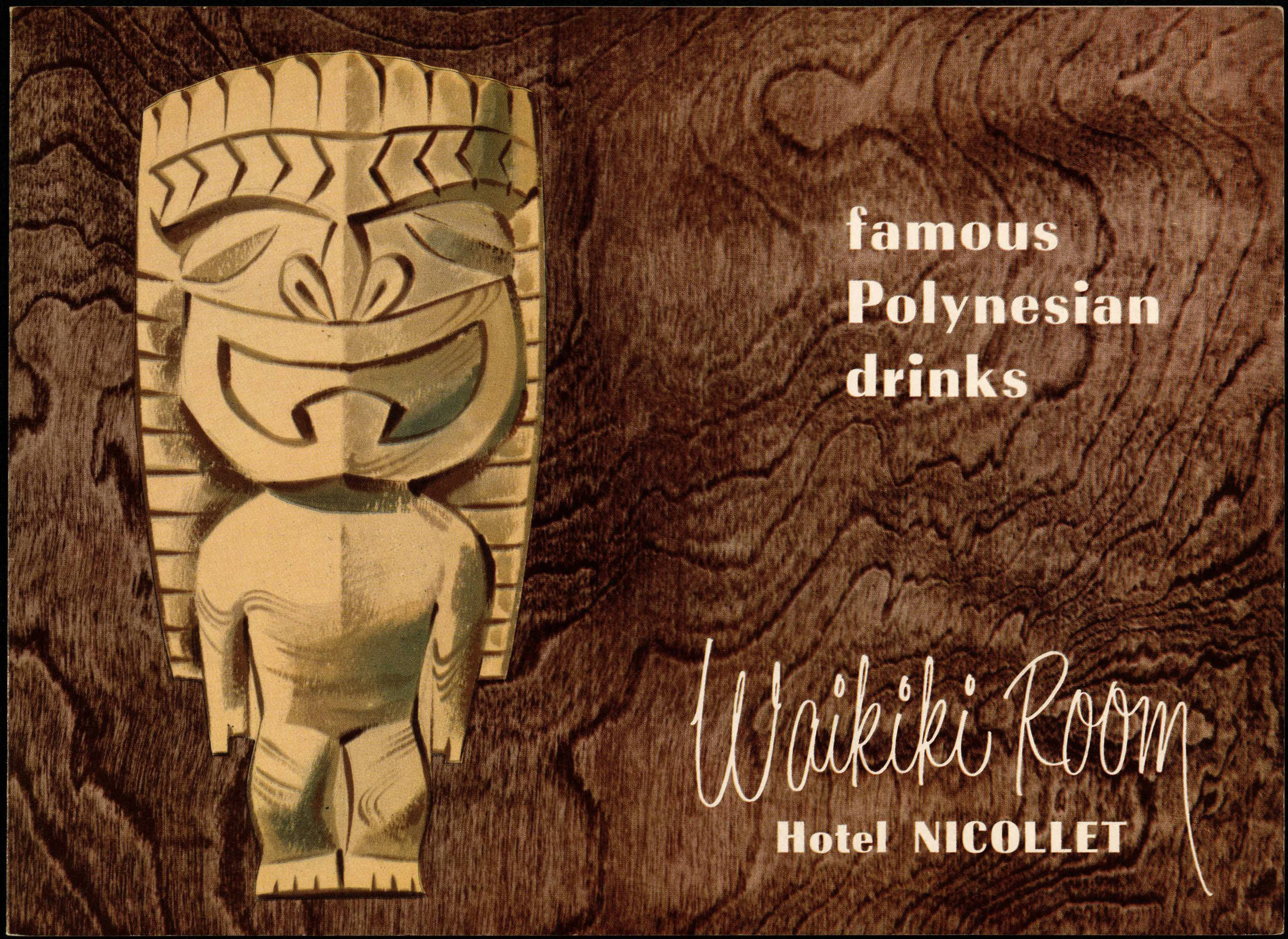
Waikiki Room Drink Menu - DPLA - 0bf2a873a4d849fee669b5a5aed76562 (page 1)

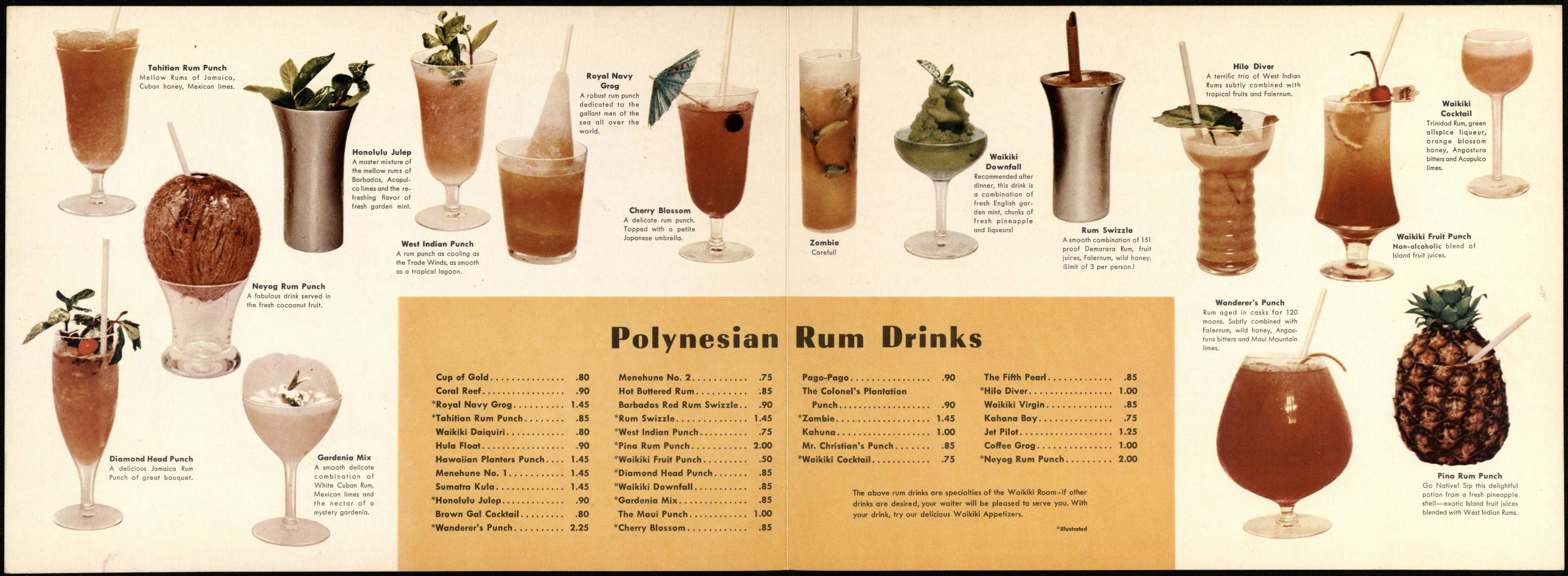
Waikiki Room Drink Menu - DPLA - 0bf2a873a4d849fee669b5a5aed76562 (page 2)

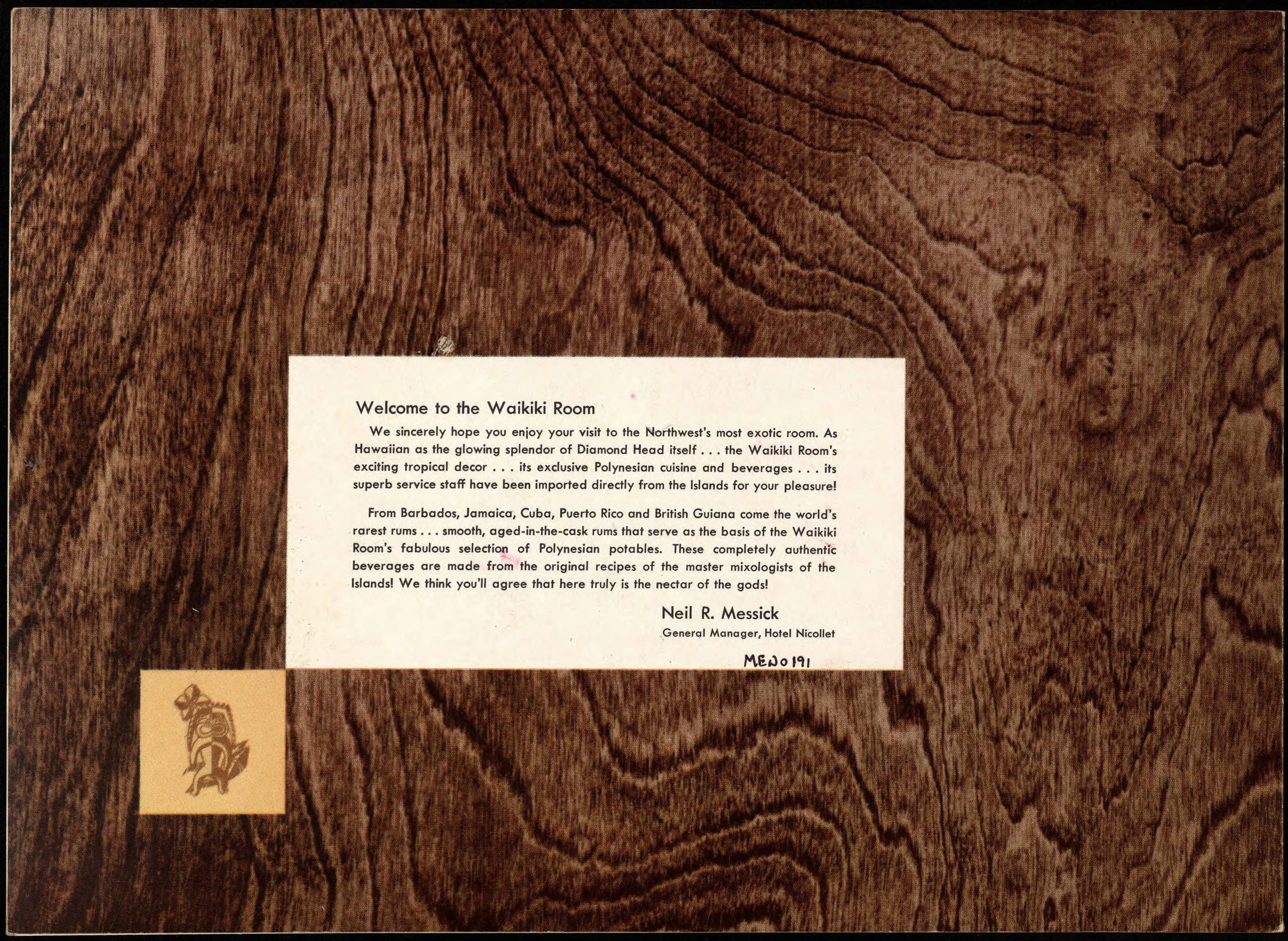
Waikiki Room Drink Menu - DPLA - 0bf2a873a4d849fee669b5a5aed76562 (page 3)
