= Hilton Boston Park Plaza =

Hotel in Boston, Massachusetts, United States

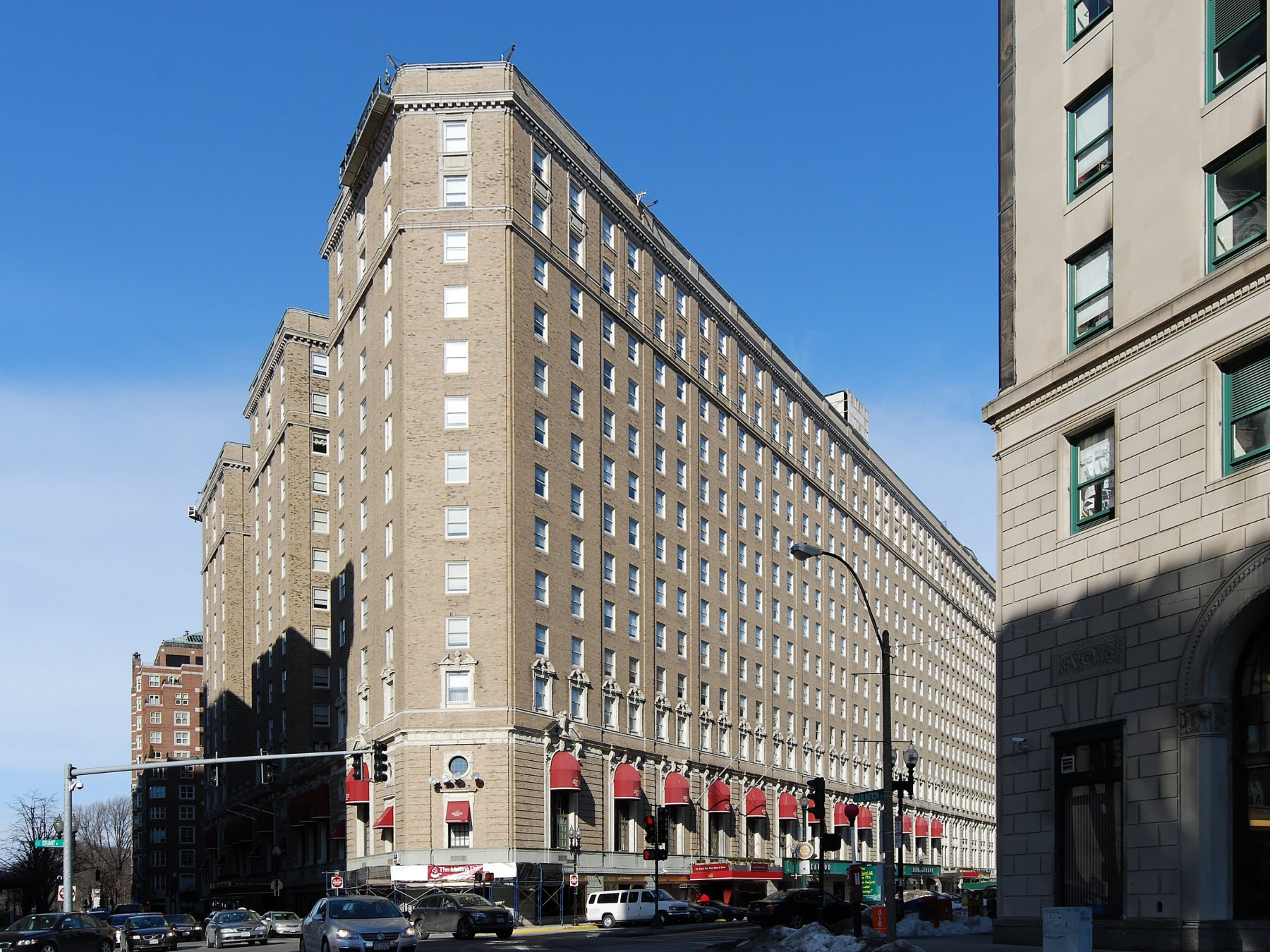
- Hilton Boston Park Plaza, 2009. The portion of the structure past the red awnings is the office building.
- Hotel chain: Hilton Hotels & Resorts

General information
- Location: Boston, Massachusetts, 50 Park Plaza; Boston, MA 02116-3912
- Coordinates: 42.351°N 71.0704°W
- Opening: March 10, 1927
- Cost: $14 million (1927)
- Owner: Parks Hospitality Holdings
- Operator: Hilton Hotels & Resorts

Height
- Height: 155 ft (47 m)

Technical details
- Floor count: 15

Design and construction
- Architect: George B. Post
- Developer: Statler Hotels

Other information
- Number of rooms: 1,300 with private baths (1927); 941 rooms & suites (2012); 1,053 rooms & suites (2013); 1,060 rooms & suites (2016)
- Number of restaurants: 4

Website
- www.hilton.com/en/hotels/bossrhh-hilton-boston-park-plaza/

The Hilton Boston Park Plaza is a historic hotel in Boston, Massachusetts, United States, opened on March 10, 1927. It was built by hotelier E.M. Statler as part of his Statler Hotels chain. A prototype of the grand American hotel, it was called a "city within a city" and also contains an adjoining office building. It was the first hotel in the world to offer in-room radio in every room.

== History ==
During the hotel's construction, it was discovered that the Statler's planned 155 foot height exceeded the maximum height of 125 feet (38 m) allowed by the Massachusetts State Building Code. However the building was granted a special exemption by Mayor James Michael Curley, making it the tallest building in the city for a time, with the exception of the Boston Custom House Tower. The building, filling an entire triangular city block, has two uses. The western half houses the hotel, while the eastern half has, since the building's construction, served as offices. The hotel opened on March 10, 1927, as the Hotel Statler Boston.

The Statler chain was sold to Hilton Hotels in 1954 and the hotel was renamed the The Statler Hilton in 1958. In December 1976, Hilton announced plans to close the Statler Hilton Boston, but the closure was avoided when the Irving M. Saunders family purchased the hotel and renamed it The Boston Park Plaza Hotel & Towers. In 1997, the Saunders Hotel Group (Roger Saunders and sons) sold the Boston Park Plaza to Starwood.

In 2011, Starwood sold the hotel for $126 million to a partnership between Highgate Hotels, Rockpoint Group, and the Donald Saunders Family, LLC. Two years later the Highgate/Rockpoint/Saunders partnership sold the hotel for $250 million to the Sunstone Hotel Investors REIT who retained Highgate to manage the hotel, and shortened the hotel's name to simply Boston Park Plaza. In 2016 Sunstone completed a $100 million renovation of the hotel and received a Four Diamond Award from AAA.

In 2023, the hotel was sold to Mexico City-based Parks Hospitality Holdings for $370 million. It was rebranded the Hilton Boston Park Plaza on October 31, 2023, when Hilton Hotels & Resorts assumed management.

From 1994 through 2018, the Boston Park Plaza was a member of Historic Hotels of America, the official program of the National Trust for Historic Preservation.

=== 2024 open-ended strike ===
On October 6, 2024, UNITE HERE Local 26 members employed at the Hilton Boston Park Plaza began an opened-ended strike which involves 24 hours a day, 7 days a week picketing outside the hotel's entrance. On October 7, it was reported that in contrast to previous labor strikes in Boston which sometimes only lasted a few days, the ongoing strike at Hilton Boston Park Plaza would continue indefinitely. The strike picketing at Hilton Boston Park Plaza would end on October 30, 2024 after the striking hotel workers voted to ratify a new labor contract. Hilton Boston Park Plaza workers would then return to work on November 1, 2024.

=== Other tenants ===
The Statler Hotel building was also home to the Northern Jurisdiction of the Scottish Rite from 1927 to 1968, and radio station WEZE's broadcast studio from 1957 to 1977. George Carlin worked briefly as a DJ at WEZE in 1957. TWA and Delta had ticket offices in the building until 1998 and 2000 respectively. In the late 1960s, the University of Massachusetts Boston leased part of the building and converted it into faculty and departmental office space. The building has also served as the venue for Anthro New England, a furry convention held in the Greater Boston area. In 2023 Road Scholar moved its headquarters into the Statler Building.

=== Park Plaza Castle ===
The hotel used to operate the Park Plaza Castle, a banquet facility located in the adjacent former Armory of the First Corps of Cadets building, listed on the National Register of Historic Places.
