= HVS Global Hospitality Services =

American consulting firm in the hospitality industry

HVS
- Type: Private
- Industry: Hospitality
- Founded: 1980
- Founder: Steve Rushmore
- Area served: Worldwide
- Number of employees: 500
- Website: www.hvs.com

HVS, formerly known as Hospitality Valuation Services, is a privately held consulting firm specializing in the hospitality industry. Founded in 1980 by Steve Rushmore, the firm provides valuation, feasibility, asset-management, brokerage, operational-consulting and related services for hotels and other hospitality properties. HVS operates through a network of offices in North America, South America, Europe, Asia, Africa, and the Middle East.

== History ==
Originally known as Hospitality Valuation Services, the company was founded by Steve Rushmore in 1980 in a one-room office in Garden City, New York. Rushmore, a graduate of the Cornell University School of Hotel Administration, drew upon his experience as head of the hospitality consulting division of Helmsley-Spear, a position he took on in 1971. At that time, there were valuation companies specializing in appraising real estate (but not hotel operations) and accounting firms knowledgeable in hotel operations (but not real estate). Recognizing the need for an appraisal company that specialized in the hospitality arena, Rushmore pursued membership in the Appraisal Institute (then known as the American Institute of Real Estate Appraisers). When he received the MAI designation from the Institute in 1976, Rushmore enjoyed the distinction of being the Institute's only member with a degree in hotel administration.

Combining his Appraisal Institute membership with his hotel school degree from Cornell, Rushmore then wrote an appraisal textbook for the hospitality industry, The Valuation of Hotels and Motels, which the Institute published in 1978. The text has been updated numerous times, and the most recent publication is Hotel Market Analysis and Valuation: International Issues and Software Applications, which is co-authored with Stephen Rushmore Jr., HVS’s current CEO and President. This publication has been described as "the seminal text on the art and science of hotel appraisals". This, and other publications by Rushmore and HVS staff, established the methodology for appraising hotels that is today considered an industry standard.

Capitalizing on its singular status as the only consulting and valuation company dedicated solely to the hospitality industry, HVS expanded, opening a West Coast office in San Francisco five years later, followed by offices in London, Colorado, and Florida. Today, the company has a presence in fifty cities on four continents.

== Operations ==
The organizational structure and operations of HVS are modeled on those of other consulting firms, such as McKinsey & Company, particularly with regards to the company's recruitment of hospitality students from prestigious universities and its compensation structure. Although the learning curve is steep, those who thrive in the company's entrepreneurial environment have the opportunity to transfer to other offices in a different part of the globe. In a May 2010 cover story about HVS, Lodging Hospitality magazine opined, "The list of alumni reads like a who's who of the most highly regarded consultants, development executives and financial experts in the worldwide lodging industry."

To help market its hotel consulting and valuation services, HVS disseminates a broad spectrum of complimentary information to the lodging industry. HVS associates publish articles on informative, timely, and interesting topics for the lodging industry, and the research and writings of HVS associates are published and cited in trade journals, digital publications, and newspapers around the world.

HVS conducts seminars on hotel valuation and the hospitality industry for the Appraisal Institute and other organizations around the world and has trained more than 20,000 appraisers and industry professionals. HVS research and data-gathering about historical and projected hotel value trends, sales transaction data, hotel brokerage, compensation programs, U.S. lodging taxes, franchise fees, hotel development costs, and hotel renovation costs provides data to industry participants.

== Research and conference sponsorship ==
Consistent with the academic background of the company's founder, HVS supports several institutions of higher learning that specialize in hospitality. To foster academic research in the field, HVS endows a professorial chair at Cornell University's hotel school. HVS also funded the Rushmore–Jennings Computer Library for New York University's Preston Robert Tisch Center for Hospitality, Tourism, and Sports Management. HVS employees routinely conduct seminars at universities around the world on hotel valuation and feasibility.

Each year, HVS plays a significant role in New York University's International Hospitality Industry Investment Conference, where the company presents its annual report on Hotel Valuation and Transaction Trends for the U.S. Lodging Industry to conference attendees. An HVS executive serves as the conference coordinator, and others associated with the company serve as panel moderators and speakers.

HVS has also launched other industry conferences around the globe and continues to organize the Mexico Hotel & Tourism Investment Conference (MexHIC) and the Caribbean Hospitality Investment Conference and Operations Summit (CHICOS), among others.

== Key publications ==
- Rushmore, Stephen, and Stephen Rushmore, Jr (2012). Hotel Market Analysis and Valuation: International Issues and Software Applications, Appraisal Institute. ISBN 978-1-935328-28-5.
- Rushmore, Stephen, and Erich Baum (2001). Hotels and Motels – Valuations and Market Studies, Appraisal Institute. ISBN 0-922154-70-8.
- Rushmore, Stephen (1992). Hotels and Motels: A Guide to Market Analysis, Investment Analysis, and Valuations, Appraisal Institute. ISBN 0-922154-06-6.
- Rushmore, Stephen (1990). The Computerized Income Approach to Hotel/Motel Market Studies and Valuations, American Institute of Real Estate Appraisers. ISBN 0-922154-02-3.
- Rushmore, Stephen (1990). Hotel Investments: A Guide for Owners and Lenders, Warren, Gorham and Lamont, Inc. ISBN 0-7913-0379-9.
- Rushmore, Stephen (1986). How to Perform an Economic Feasibility Study of a Proposed Hotel/Motel, American Society of Real Estate Counselors.
- Rushmore, Stephen (1983). Hotels, Motels and Restaurants: Valuations and Market Studies, American Institute of Real Estate Appraisers. ISBN 0-911780-70-X.
- Rushmore, Stephen (1978). The Valuation of Hotels and Motels, American Institute of Real Estate Appraisers. ISBN 0-911780-44-0.

Recent articles and presentations authored by HVS principals and associates are accessible on the HVS website.
