= Statler Hotels =

American hotel chain

- Founded: 1901; 125 years ago, in Buffalo, New York, United States.
- Founder: Ellsworth Milton Statler
- Defunct: 1954

The Statler Hotel Company was an American early hotel chain catering to traveling businessmen and tourists. It was founded by Ellsworth Milton Statler in Buffalo, New York, United States.

== History ==
=== Early ventures ===
In 1901, Buffalo hosted the Pan-American Exposition. Statler built a hotel on the Exposition grounds and called it "Statler's Hotel". It was a temporary wooden structure intended to last the duration of the Exposition. With 2,084 rooms, it could accommodate 5,000 guests. Although the Exposition was deemed an overall failure due to a number of factors (including bad weather and the assassination of President William McKinley), Statler was one of the few vendors to make a small profit.

His next venture was the Inside Inn, built for the 1904 Louisiana Purchase Exposition in St. Louis, Missouri. Another temporary wooden structure, it was the world's largest hotel with 2,257 rooms. A grand success, the hotel made Statler a net profit of $361,000 and laid the groundwork for his first permanent hotel. The hotel was then dismantled and sold for scrap. The Inside Inn was near the edge of Forest Park in St. Louis, now traversed by Highway 64/40.

=== Formation ===
The first "permanent" Statler hotel was designed by August Esenwein and James A. Johnson, built in Buffalo, New York, and offered 300 rooms and bathrooms (later expanded to 450 rooms and baths). It was the first hotel chain to offer such amenity. The hotel was successful and led to a chain of hotels in other cities. Statler's intent was not to compete with the luxury hotels, but to provide, clean, comfortable, and moderately-priced rooms for the average traveler. Statler was the first major hotel chain to have a bathroom in every room. His innovative Statler Plumbing Shaft is still used in modern construction. From providing paper and pens for correspondence (prominently bearing the Statler name) to a light in the closet, Statler brought the average traveler a level of luxury that was otherwise unaffordable.

Rooms were originally available at what seemed a very cheap price, leading many other hoteliers to predict the failure of the Buffalo hotel. The opening night price was as low as $1.50 for a guest room, leading to the slogan "A Room and a Bath for a Dollar and a Half". The hotel had a $500,000 line of credit available, but maintained positive cash flow and Statler never used the line of credit. The Statler hotel in St. Louis was the first in the nation to offer air conditioning. The Dallas Statler hotel was the first in the nation to have elevator music.

Each of the subsequent Statler Hotels built upon this formula for success. Reflecting the era's enthusiasm for scientific management, Statler took pride in how he standardized questions of room design. His hotels had minimal wasted space, particularly on the guestroom floors, and he strove to have room layouts that would maximize efficiency and profitability.

After Statler's death in 1928, the company built hotels in Washington, D.C., Los Angeles, California, Hartford, Connecticut, and Dallas, Texas. Many of these hotels were designed by the architectural firm of George Post & Sons, the successor firm of George B. Post. In the mid- and late-1940s, pianist Liberace "gained national exposure through his performance contracts with the Statler and Radisson hotel chains".

The Hotels Statler Company, Inc., was sold to Conrad Hilton's Hilton Hotels in 1954 for $111 million, then the world's largest real estate transaction.

The Statler hotel in Buffalo was the first to be demolished after the Hilton acquisition, in 1968. The Statler hotel in New York became the Hotel Pennsylvania.

== List of hotels ==
City	Built	Names	Notes	Image
Buffalo	1901	Statler's Hotel	Statler built this 2084-room temporary hotel to serve visitors to the Pan-American Exposition. The hotel was demolished when the fair closed.	
St. Louis	1904	The Inside Inn	The largest hotel in the world at the time, this 2257-room temporary structure within the grounds of the Louisiana Purchase Exposition opened on April 30, 1904 and closed on December 1, 1904. It was built of wood, stucco and burlap, and was demolished and sold for scrap as soon as the fair ended.	
Buffalo	1907	Hotel Statler; Hotel Buffalo	The original Hotel Statler, at Swan and Washington streets in Buffalo, was opened in 1907. It was renamed Hotel Buffalo in 1923 upon completion of the new Hotel Statler at Niagara Square, but Statler continued to operate it until the 1930s, when they sold it. The Hotel Buffalo closed in 1967 and was finally demolished in 1968. The site remained vacant until Pilot Field was built there in 1988.	
Cleveland	1912	Hotel Statler Cleveland; The Statler Hilton Cleveland; The Cleveland Plaza; The Statler Tower; Statler Arms Apartments; The Statler	The Statler in Cleveland was initially converted into an office building in 1980 as The Statler Tower. In 2001 the building was converted into a 295-unit apartment building, Statler Arms. It was renamed The Statler in 2019.	
Detroit	1915	Hotel Statler Detroit; The Statler Hilton Detroit; Detroit Hilton; Detroit Heritage Hotel	Hilton terminated its management of the 1000-room Detroit Hilton in 1974. It briefly became the Detroit Heritage Hotel, and closed soon after. Demolition of the hotel began in August 2005 and was completed before the Detroit-hosted Super Bowl in 2006. The City Club Apartments CBD Detroit opened on the site in 2021, including a French restaurant named The Statler Bistro	
St. Louis	1917	Hotel Statler St. Louis; The Statler Hilton St. Louis; The St. Louis Gateway Hotel; Renaissance St. Louis Grand Hotel; Marriott St. Louis Grand Hotel	The St. Louis Statler was sold by Hilton in 1968 and renamed The Gateway Hotel. It was closed in 1987, and it underwent a mysterious and oft-litigated arson fire the following year. It was expanded, renovated and reopened from 2000-2002 as the Renaissance St. Louis Grand Hotel, it was renamed the Marriott St. Louis Grand in 2015.	
New York City	1919	Hotel Pennsylvania; Hotel Statler New York; The Statler Hilton New York; The New York Statler; New York Penta Hotel; Hotel Pennsylvania	The Hotel Pennsylvania, across the street from Penn Station, was built by the Pennsylvania Railroad in 1919 and managed by Ellsworth Statler's company. The hotel was acquired by the Hotels Statler Company in 1948 and renamed the New York Statler Hotel, operated as The Statler Hilton, then as the New York Penta, until it reverted to the Hotel Pennsylvania. The hotel closed in 2020 and the owners, Vornado Realty Trust, completed their above-grade demolition in September, 2023.	
Buffalo	1923	Hotel Statler Buffalo; The Statler Hilton Buffalo; Statler Towers; Statler City	The second Buffalo Statler was gradually converted to offices starting in 1948 (when WBEN-TV began using the building as their first studios) because it had more hotel rooms than the city could support. In 1984 the last hotel rooms were closed and the building was renamed Statler Towers, although its ballrooms remained in use for catered events and banquets. After a failed renovation attempt into a combination of hotel and condos in the late 2000s, the building went into bankruptcy, and was auctioned in August 2010. On March 15, 2011, the property was acquired by local developer Mark D. Croce, who immediately began refurbishing the building as Statler City. The public rooms on the lower floors reopened on Dec 31, 2011 with the upper floors set to reopen later. After Croce's death in 2020, Douglas Jemal of Washington, D.C. acquired the building, having recently purchased Seneca One Tower in 2016. Jemal has begun work to convert the lower levels to a casino and the upper levels to 600 apartments. Located in the Joseph Ellicott Historic District.	
Boston	1927	Hotel Statler Boston; Statler Hilton Boston; Boston Park Plaza	The Boston Statler is still a hotel, the Hilton Boston Park Plaza.	
Pittsburgh	1940	William Penn Hotel; Penn-Sheraton Hotel; Westin William Penn; Omni William Penn Hotel	Statler managed this hotel from 1940 to 1951, though they did not own it and it never used the Statler name.	
Washington	1943	Hotel Statler Washington D.C. The Statler Hilton Washington D.C. Capital Hilton	The only hotel bought by and continuously operated by Hilton Hotels is the Washington, D.C. Statler, now called The Capital Hilton.	
Los Angeles	1952	Hotel Statler Los Angeles; The Statler Hilton Los Angeles; The Los Angeles Hilton; Omni Los Angeles Hotel; The Wilshire Grand Hotel	The Los Angeles Statler operated for many years as the Statler Hilton, then the Omni Los Angeles, and finally The Wilshire Grand Hotel. Korean Airlines purchased the hotel in 1989. The hotel closed on January 19, 2011. It was demolished in 2013 and replaced with the Wilshire Grand Tower, the tallest building in the Western US, a 73-story tower combining an InterContinental hotel and offices.	
Hartford	1954	Hotel Statler Hartford; The Statler Hilton Hartford; Hartford Hilton; The Parkview Hilton	The Hartford Statler, later known as the Parkview Hilton, was closed and demolished in 1990. The site is now a parking lot.	
Dallas	1956	The Statler Hilton Dallas; Dallas Hilton; Dallas Grand Hotel; The Statler Hotel & Residences	The Dallas Statler property was still under construction when the company was sold and opened as the Statler Hilton Dallas in 1956. It closed in 2001, having operated in its last years as the Dallas Grand Hotel. In May 2008, The National Trust for Historic Preservation listed the building on their list of America's Most Endangered Places. It was restored and reopened in 2017 as part of Hilton's Curio Collection division.	
Ithaca	1986	Cornell School of Hotel Administration	The Statler Hotel on Cornell University's Campus was built in 1986, long after Ellsworth M Statler had passed. Provisions from Statler's will allowed this unique hotel to be operated by The Cornell School of Hotel Administration.	

== Gallery ==
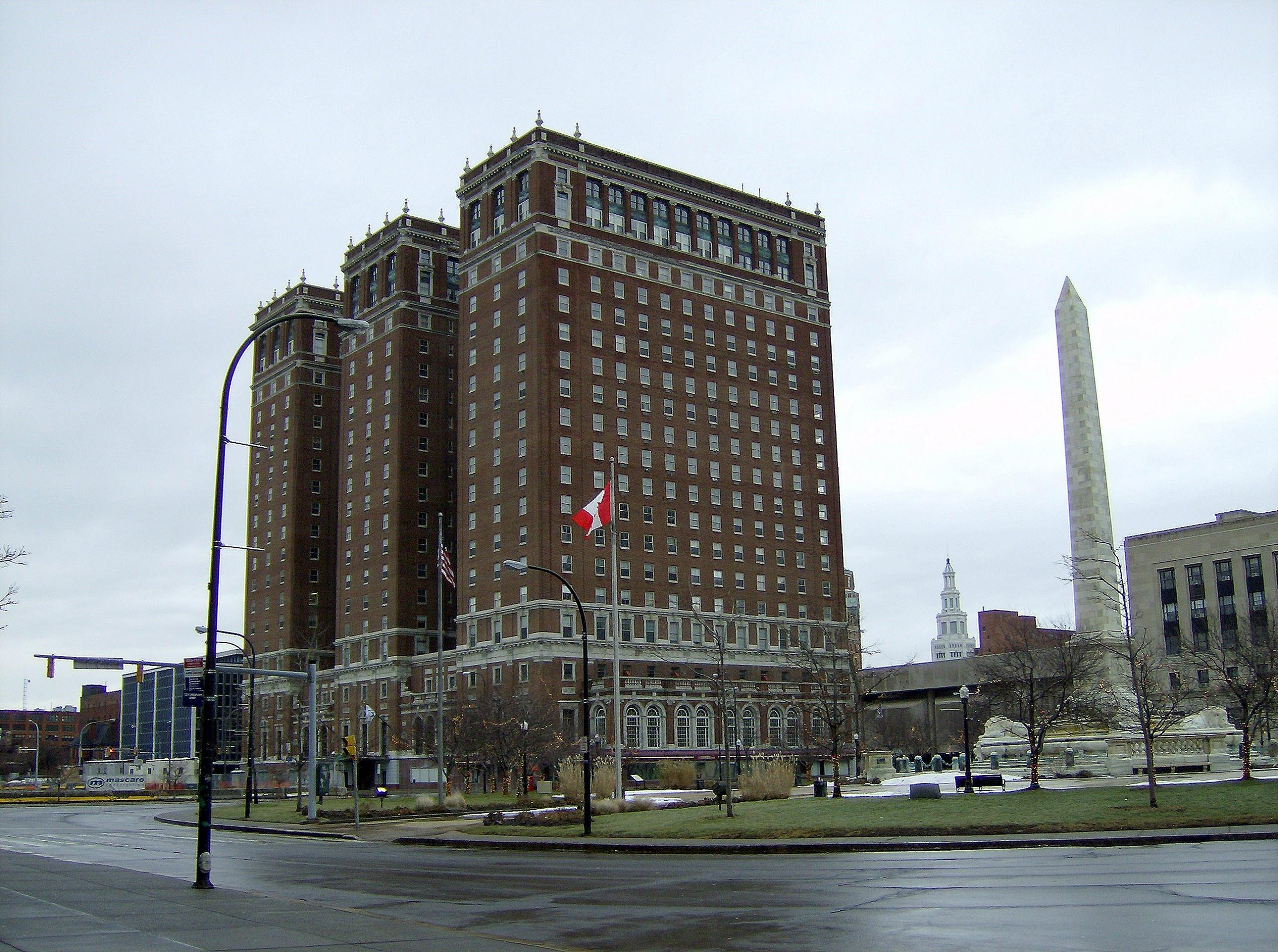
Statler City, Buffalo, New York.

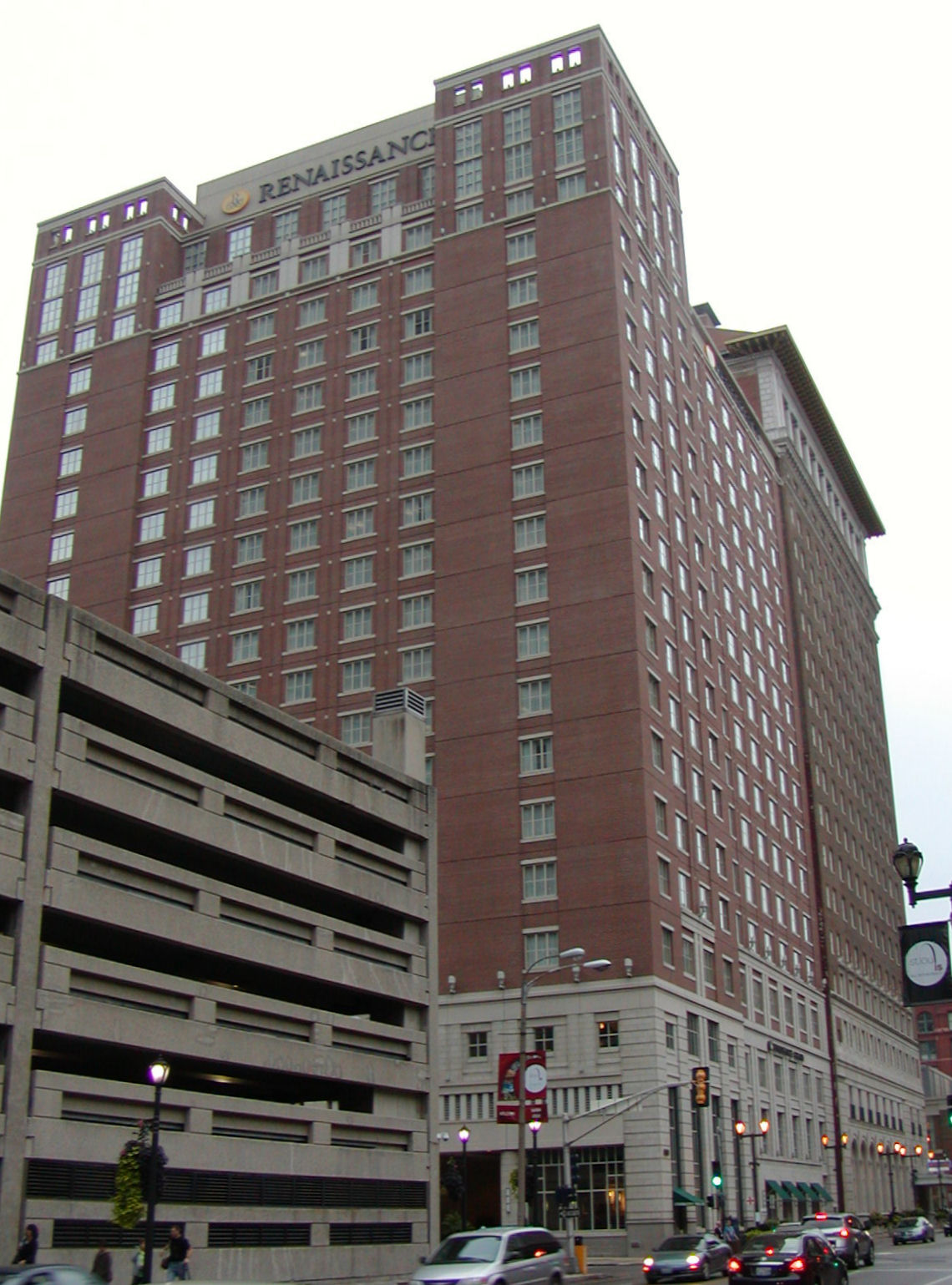
Renaissance Grand Hotel St. Louis, MO the original Statler Hotel is the back half of the building now.

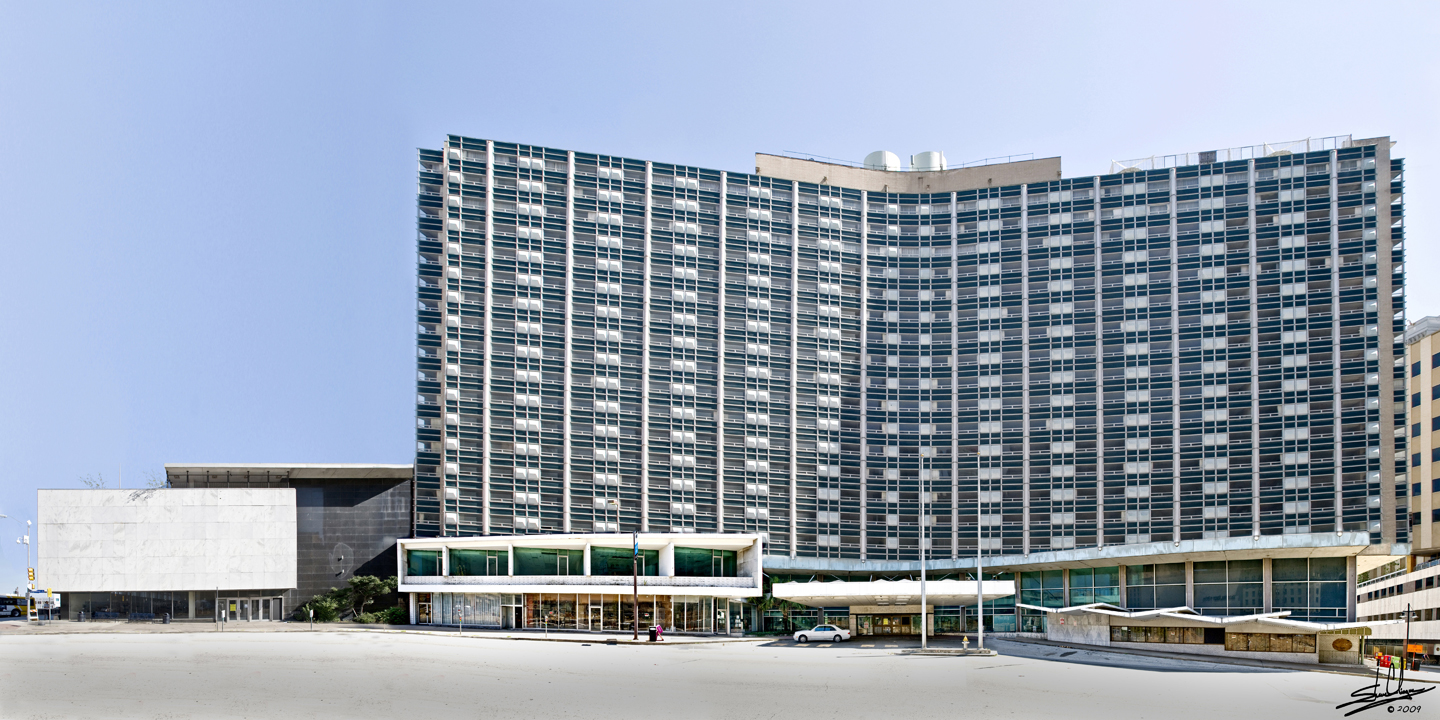
Statler Hilton Hotel, Dallas TX.

== The Statler Hotel - Buffalo, New York ==
The Travel Channel's documentary paranormal television show Destination Fear filmed at the location in 2019 for the seventh episode of their first season.

In 2020, former owner Mark Croce was killed in a helicopter crash. As of June 2021, the hotel has been purchased by developers planning to turn the building into a mixed-use structure with retail, meeting and entertainment space, and 600 - 700 residential units.

== See also ==
- List of tallest buildings in Buffalo, New York
