= Hotel Ezra Cornell =

- Motto: Showcasing Hospitality Education Through Student Leadership
- Type: Undergraduate student organization
- Established: 1925
- Academic affiliation: Cornell University School of Hotel Administration
- Location: Ithaca, New York, U.S.
- Website: https://hotelezracornell.com/

Hotel Ezra Cornell (HEC) is an annual weekend-long educational conference put on by the students of the Cornell School of Hotel Administration for leaders of the hospitality industry. Composed of educational seminars, leisure activities, and food and beverage events, the program is currently in its 100th year, predating the School of Hotel Administration and making HEC one of the oldest organizations at Cornell University. The purpose of the weekend is for students to practice the skills they have learned in the classroom and to showcase their talents to industry professionals, many of whom are Cornell alumni.

HEC is planned, managed, and staffed entirely by students. Over the course of one academic year, the student Board of Directors, assistant directors, and managers plan all of the details of HEC, and during the weekend, over 300 students are involved with executing program events. All aspects of the program, including food preparation and service, program marketing, event design, and the turndown service at night, are handled by students, with faculty members acting only as advisers.

== History ==
HEC has its origins in 1925, when Professor Howard Meek, who would later serve as the first Dean of the School of Hotel Administration, took a group of students to New York City to manage the Hotel Astor for a day. Upon returning to Ithaca, the students decided to hold the grand opening of "The Only Hotel for a Day" to demonstrate that hospitality management could be taught in an academic setting, and organized an extravagant formal dinner party for hospitality industry leaders. Lacking an event space of its own, the inaugural Hotel Ezra Cornell was held on May 7, 1926 in Risley Hall on Cornell's campus. The second year of HEC was a turning point in the history of Cornell's hospitality program, and featured one of the world's leading hoteliers, Ellsworth Milton Statler, as a guest of honor to assess the quality of Cornell's nascent hospitality program. At the main banquet, Statler commented, "I'm converted. Meek can have any damn thing he wants," an moment traditionally held to mark the founding of the School of Hotel Administration.

As the School of Hotel Administration gained prominence, future HECs became more elaborate, with each year adopting a unique theme that informed program events. An example of this practice was HEC 60, which was themed "Diamond Robbery" and styled as a mystery theater. The whole weekend was centered on solving a fictitious diamond robbery, with each social event providing clues. Such themed events were gradually phased out with HEC 77, when the focus of the weekend shifted from socializing to learning and was modeled after existing hospitality industry conferences, with a greater emphasis on guest speakers and panelists.

Students coined the tag line "The Best Ever" to describe how their HEC would top all previous HECs.

== Important dates in the HEC timeline ==
- 1926: HEC 1
- 1927: E.M. Statler pledges support
- 1938: HEC is dedicated to Howard Meek, who will later serve as the first Dean of the School of Hotel Administration
- 1943: 20th Anniversary of hotel program, announcement that Statler Foundation would support new facility for school
- 1950: The cornerstone of Statler Hall is laid
- 1951: Meek is named director of hotel program; the new Statler Hall opens
- 1955: The Hotel School becomes an independent unit
- 1962: Meek’s last year, HEC is dedicated to him
- 1972: Educational focus introduced
- 1980: Formal dinner becomes multiple dinners—guests get to choose which dinner to attend
- 1988 & 1989: Statler Hotel undergoes renovation, so HEC is held all over campus
- 1990: Grand Opening of Statler Hotel and J. Willard Marriott Executive Education Center, with a record number of industry leaders in attendance
- 2005: First year with HEC to be held in the Robert A. and Jan M. Beck Center

== Notable guests ==
- Keith Barr, CEO, InterContinental Hotels Group
- Ken Blanchard, owner, Ken Blanchard Companies, author, One Minute Manager, and management consultant
- Chris Cahill, president and COO, Fairmont Hotels
- Matthew J. Hart, president and COO, Hilton Hotels Corporation
- Conrad Hilton, founder, Hilton Hotels Corporation
- Howard Deering Johnson, founder, Howard Johnson's Hotels
- Bill Marriott, executive chairman and former CEO, Marriott Hotels
- David Neeleman, CEO, JetBlue
- Drew Nieporent, president, Myriad Restaurant Group
- L. Timothy Ryan, president, Culinary Institute of America
- William Shaw, president and COO, Marriott International
- Barry Sternlicht, CEO, Starwood Capital Group
- Jonathan Tisch, president and CEO, Loews Hotels
- Steve Wynn, chairman, Wynn Resorts
