= The Hotel Van Cleve =

Hotel in Dayton, Ohio

Coordinates: 39°45′42.2″N 84°11′38.1″W

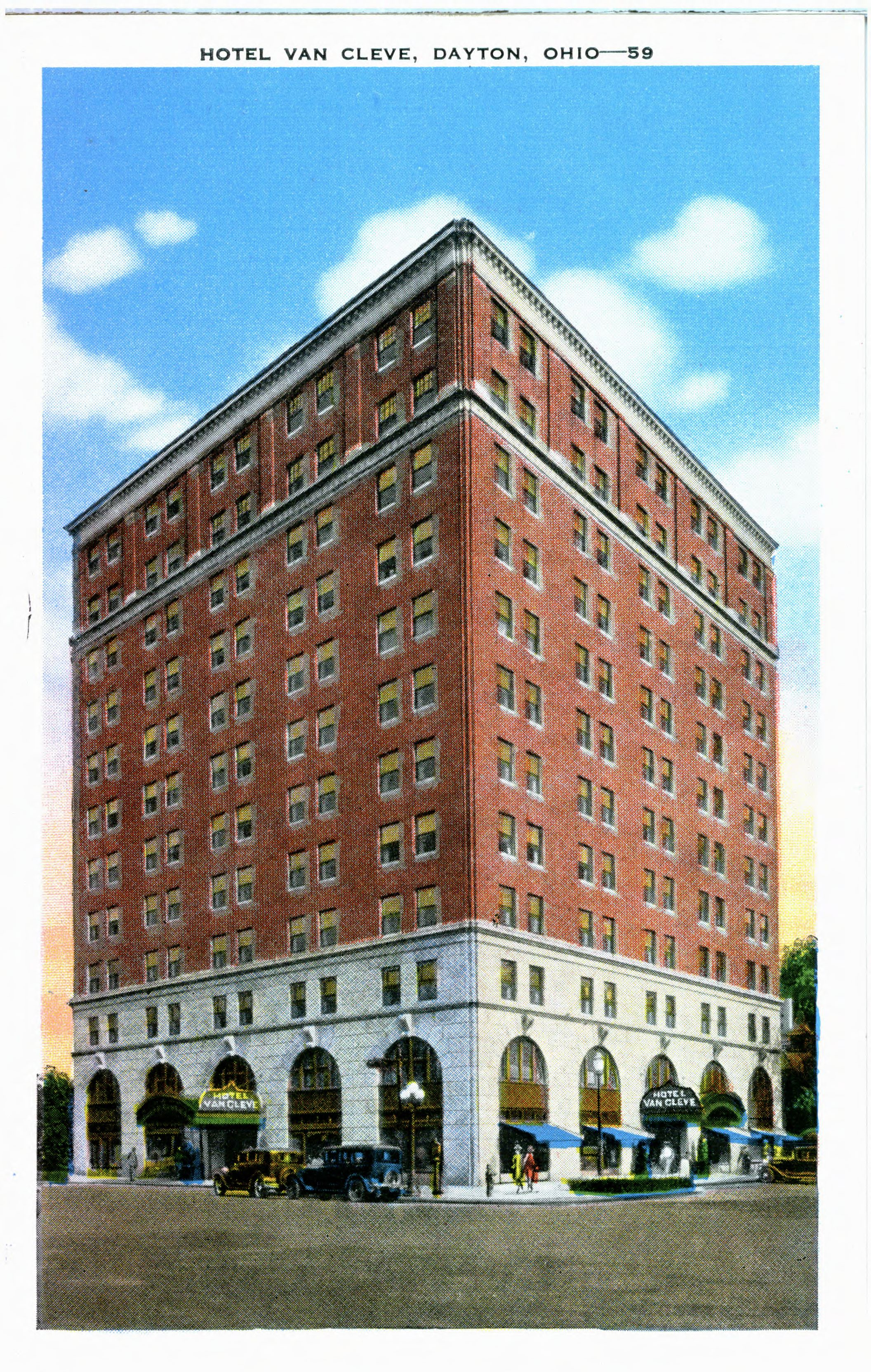
Hotel Van Cleve

The Hotel Van Cleve was a 12-story, 236-room hotel that stood at 36 West 1st Street in Dayton, Ohio. It opened in 1928 and was demolished in 1969. In 1948, Boeing engineers met there and designed the B-52 Stratofortress over a single weekend.

== History ==
The Hotel Van Cleve was named after William Van Cleave, who had established a hotel and tavern in Dayton in 1812. The hotel was financed by the Stranahan, Harris and Otis Company of Toledo and built in 1927 by Hill Smith and Company for $1.2 million. The hotel opened in January 1928 in the presence of Ohio Governor Vic Donahey, Columbus Mayor James J. Thomas, and prominent hoteliers from across the United States. The first general manager was C.C. Schiffler, a German-born hotelier who had managed the Ritz-Carlton in New York.

In 1932, the hotel was acquired and run through the 1930s by hotel industry pioneer Ralph Hitz's National Hotel Management Company. In the fall of 1939, the Van Cleve hosted Bob Chester's orchestra for a dance music program, aired nationally on CBS radio.

On 21 October 1948, Boeing engineers George S. Schairer, Art Carlsen, and Vaughn Blumenthal presented the design of a four-engine turboprop bomber to the U.S. Air Force's chief of bomber development at nearby Wright-Patterson Air Force Base, who expressed disappointment and asked if the Boeing team could produce a proposal for a four-engine turbojet bomber. Joined by Ed Wells, Boeing's vice president of engineering, the engineers worked that night in the Van Cleve, redesigning Boeing's proposal as a four-engine turbojet bomber. On Friday, the Air Force looked over the information and asked for a better design. Returning to the hotel, the Boeing team was joined by Bob Withington and Maynard Pennell, two top Boeing engineers who were in town on other business. By late Friday night, they had laid out what was an essentially new airplane with 35-degree swept wings and eight engines. After a trip to a hobby shop for supplies, Schairer set to work building a model. The rest of the team focused on weight and performance data. Wells, who was also a skilled artist, completed the aircraft drawings. On Sunday, a stenographer was hired to type a clean copy of the proposal. On Monday, Schairer presented a neatly bound 33-page proposal and a 14-inch (36 cm) scale model. The aircraft became the famed B-52 Stratofortress.

Business declined through the 1960s at the Van Cleve as newer hotels and motels were built in the area. In 1967, the shareholders authorized the board to dissolve the hotel corporation and put the building up for sale. The city attempted to buy the hotel for apartments, but an anonymous donor purchased the hotel in November 1967 for between $750,000 and $1,000,000 and gave it to the Christ Episcopal Church next door. The hotel closed on December 31, 1967, although the Mayfair restaurant and the Wagon Wheel bar remained open until October 1968. The empty building was supposed to be converted into a home for the elderly, but the cost for renovation proved to be too high. The hotel's furnishings were auctioned off in March 1969, and demolition was completed in June 1969. Parking Management, Inc. opened a parking lot on the vacant site. This was supposed to be temporary, until Christ Church could decide what to do with the site. However, Parking Management, Inc. still operates a parking lot on the site today.

== Sources ==
- Knaack, Marcelle Size (1988). Post-World War II Bombers, 1945–1973 (PDF). Washington, DC: Office of Air Force History. ISBN 978-0-16-002260-9.
- Tagg, Lori S. (2004). Development of the B-52: The Wright Field Story (PDF). Dayton, Ohio: History Office Aeronautical Systems Center, Air Force Materiel Command, Wright-Patterson Air Force Base, United States Air Force. Archived from the original (PDF) on October 1, 2008.
- "Hotel Van Cleve Opens" Dayton Herald Newspaper, 4 January 1928
- Brainard Platt; "Van Cleve Hotel Up For Sale; Mayor to Make Offer" Journal Herald Newspaper (Dayton, Ohio), 28 October 1967
- "Christ Church gets OK to Buy Hotel" Journal Herald Newspaper (Dayton, Ohio), 11 November 1967
- "Alternatives Sought for Van Cleve" Journal Herald Newspaper (Dayton, Ohio), 10 February 1969
- Jerry R. Cole; "The End of the Van Cleve" Journal Herald Newspaper (Dayton, Ohio), June 11, 1969
