= Ellsworth Milton Statler =

American hotel businessman (1863–1928)

Ellsworth Milton Statler at 18

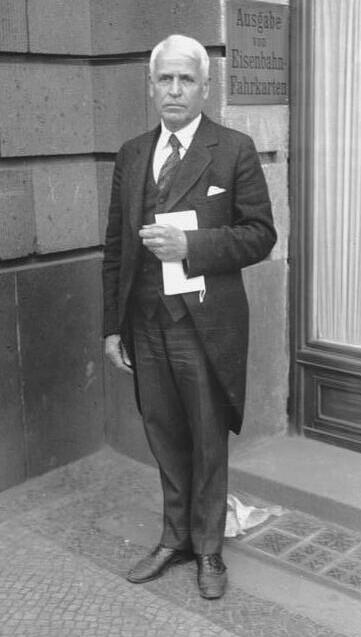
Ellsworth Milton Statler during his last visit in Berlin 1927 in front of the Adlon hotel

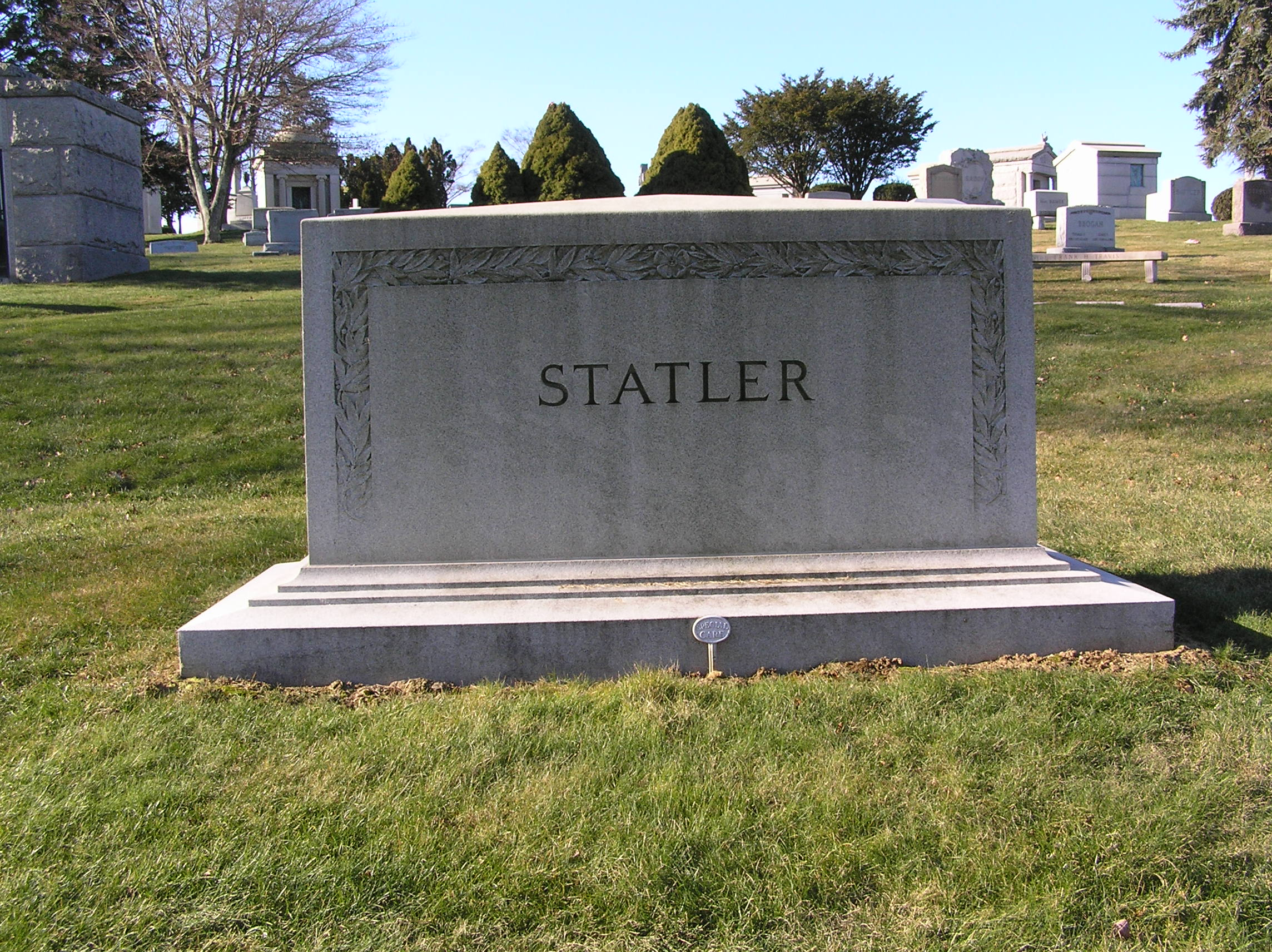
The grave of Ellsworth Statler in Kensico Cemetery

Ellsworth Milton (E. M.) Statler (October 26, 1863 – April 16, 1928) was an American hotel businessman, founder of the Statler Hotels chain.

== Biography ==
Statler built his first permanent hotel in 1907, in Buffalo, New York (it being the first major hotel to have a private bath or shower and running water in every room). Future Statler Hotels constructed by E. M. Statler were located in Cleveland (1912), Detroit (1915), St. Louis (1917), New York (the Hotel Pennsylvania, built by the Pennsylvania Railroad and leased to Statler and Franklin J. Matchette in 1919; later bought by the Hotels Statler Company in 1948), a new hotel in Buffalo (1923; the previous Hotel Statler in Buffalo was renamed the Hotel Buffalo and sold later in the 1920s), and his last hotel, the Boston Park Plaza built in Boston (1927).

The Hotels Statler Company built several other hotels after Statler's death in 1928. The Statler Hotel chain was sold to Hilton Hotels in 1954.

Following his death, the Statler Foundation was established according to his will. The foundation become a major benefactor of what is now the Cornell University School of Hotel Administration in Ithaca, New York. Headquartered in Buffalo, New York, the foundation continues to contribute to many initiatives in the hospitality industry.

On March 20, 1951, the radio show, Cavalcade of America sponsored by DuPont, featured the life story of Ellsworth Statler in a light 30 minute drama.

In 1984, E. M. Statler (as he preferred to be called) was inducted into the Wheeling, West Virginia Hall of Fame. He was also inducted into the Hospitality Industry Hall of Honor in 1997 along with Curt Carlson, Charles Forte, Baron Forte, and Ray Kroc.

== Personal life ==
Ellsworth Statler was born in Somerset County, Pennsylvania, the third of the children of Rev. William J. Statler and Mary A. McKinney (Govinda R., Charles O., Ellsworth M., Elizabeth, Alabama A., Lillian, Osceola A., and William J.).

E.M. married first Mary Idesta Manderbach (1866 – October 28, 1925) and together they raised four adopted children. Milton Howland Statler (September 16, 1906 – December 7, 1933), Marian Francis Statler (July 2, 1907 – August 7, 1927), Ellsw Morgan Statler (d. 1987), and Elva Idesta Statler (June 7, 1912 – February 27, 1935). E.M. had only one grandchild, Milton's daughter Joan M. Statler (1931–2005).

E.M. married Alice M. Seidler (d. 1969) on April 30, 1927.

== Death ==
E.M. Statler died of double pneumonia on April 16, 1928 at the Hotel Pennsylvania, where he lived. He was 64 years old.

== See also ==
- Howard B. Meek
- Statler Hotels

== Notes ==
- Jarman, Rufus (1952) A Bed for the Night
- Miller, Floyd (1969) Statler
