= Clinton J. Warren =

American architect

Clinton J. Warren (1860 – March 17, 1938) was a noted American architect who designed buildings in the United States, Europe, and Mexico. He is now remembered chiefly for his Chicago hotels.

Warren was born in Massachusetts. He moved to Chicago in 1879, and in 1880 joined the firm of Burnham and Root. By 1886 left to start his own firm. His Chicago designs of the 1890s include the Congress, Lexington, Plaza, and Virginia Hotels. For these works and others, architectural critic Carl W. Condit called Warren "the acknowledged leader among the architects of hotels and apartments." Other Chicago works include the Church of Our Savior (1888) at 530 W. Fullerton Avenue, the Security Building at 189 W. Madison Street, and the Unity Building at 127 N. Dearborn Street. In the late 1890s, Warren returned to Winchester, Massachusetts, where he designed many commercial and industrial buildings in the Boston area, on the East Coast, and several international locations.

Clinton was also an active inventor with varied interests. His patents in the early 1900s focus on washing, corking, and labeling bottles (patents 707,738; 707,740; 707,789; 707,993), as well as holders for safety-razor blades (778,388). Patents issued circa the 1920s concern parking garages (1,392,610) and convertible automobiles (1,658,110).
