= Cornell Hospitality Quarterly =

- Discipline: Hospitality management studies
- Language: English
- Edited by: J. Bruce Tracey

Publication details
- Former names: Cornell Hotel and Restaurant Administration Quarterly
- History: 1960-present
- Publisher: SAGE Publications
- Frequency: Quarterly
- Impact factor: 2.06 (2017)

Standard abbreviations
- ISO 4: Cornell Hosp. Q.

Indexing
- ISSN: 1938-9655 (print); 1938-9663 (web)
- LCCN: 2007214477
- OCLC no.: 300272748

Links
- Journal homepage; Online access; Online archive

Cornell Hospitality Quarterly is a peer-reviewed academic journal that covers the field of hospitality management studies. Its editor-in-chief is J. Bruce Tracey (Cornell University School of Hotel Administration). It was established in 1960 as the Cornell Hotel and Restaurant Administration Quarterly, obtaining its current name in February 2008. It is currently published by SAGE Publications in association with the Cornell University School of Hotel Administration.

== Abstracting and indexing ==
Cornell Hospitality Quarterly is abstracted and indexed in SCOPUS and the Social Sciences Citation Index. According to the Journal Citation Reports, its 2017 impact factor is 2.06, ranking it 31 out of 146 journals in the category "Sociology", 98 out of 209 journals in the category "Management", and 25 out of 50 journals in the category "Hospitality, Leisure, Sport & Tourism".
