= Howard B. Meek =

American educator of hotel management

Howard Bagnall Meek
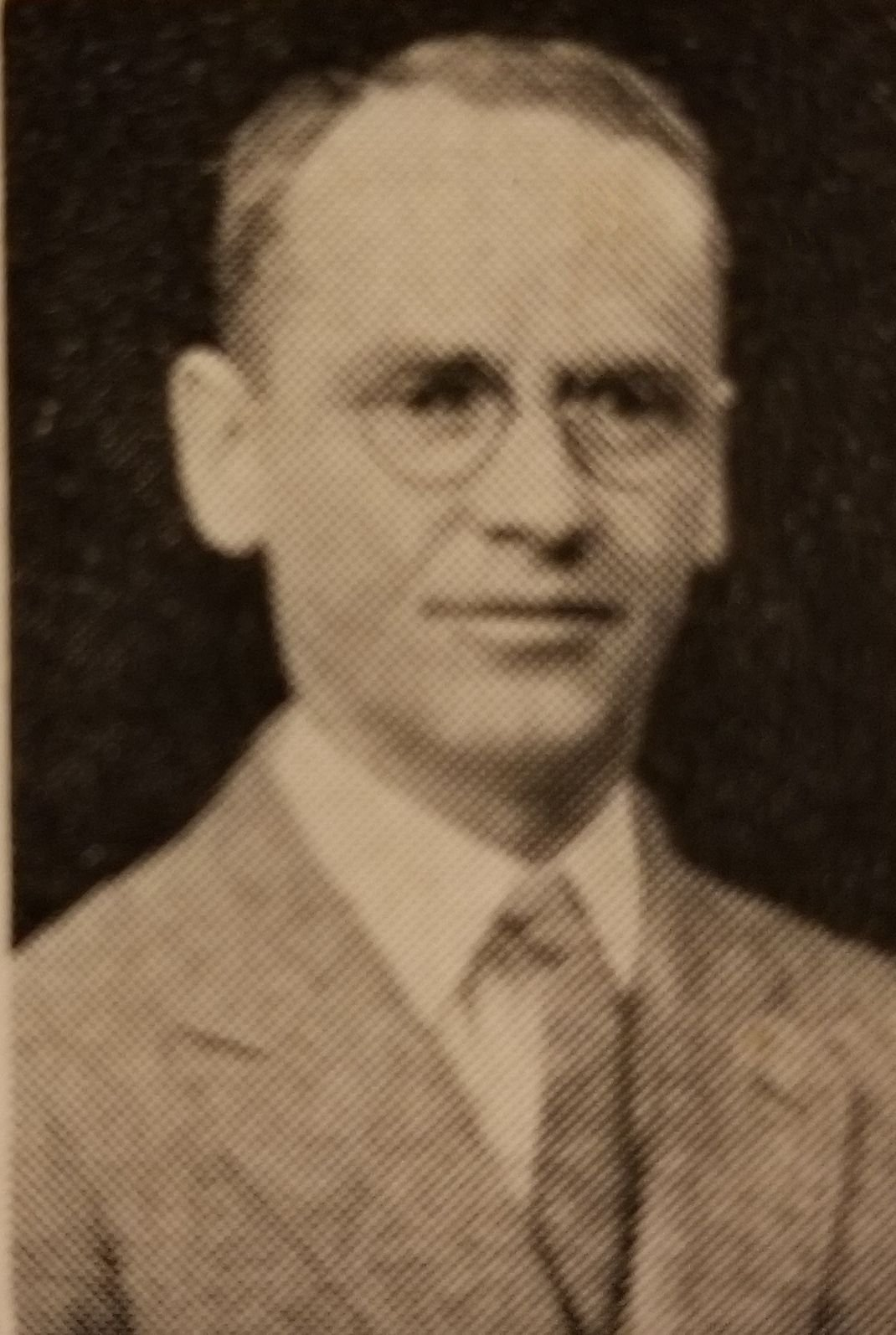
- circa 1925
- Born: Howard Bagnall Meek; October 30, 1893; Chelsea, Massachusetts
- Died: July 16, 1969 (aged 75); Pocasset, Massachusetts
- Occupation: Educator
- Known for: Cornell University School of Hotel Administration

Howard Bagnall Meek (October 30, 1893 – July 16, 1969) was an American professor who founded Cornell University's School of Hotel Administration. He began teaching hotel management at Cornell during 1922, when the subject was part of the university's agricultural college, which operated its home-economics school, rather than a separate unit within the university.
