= Nolan School of Hotel Administration =

Business school in Cornell University

Cornell University Nolan School of Hotel Administration
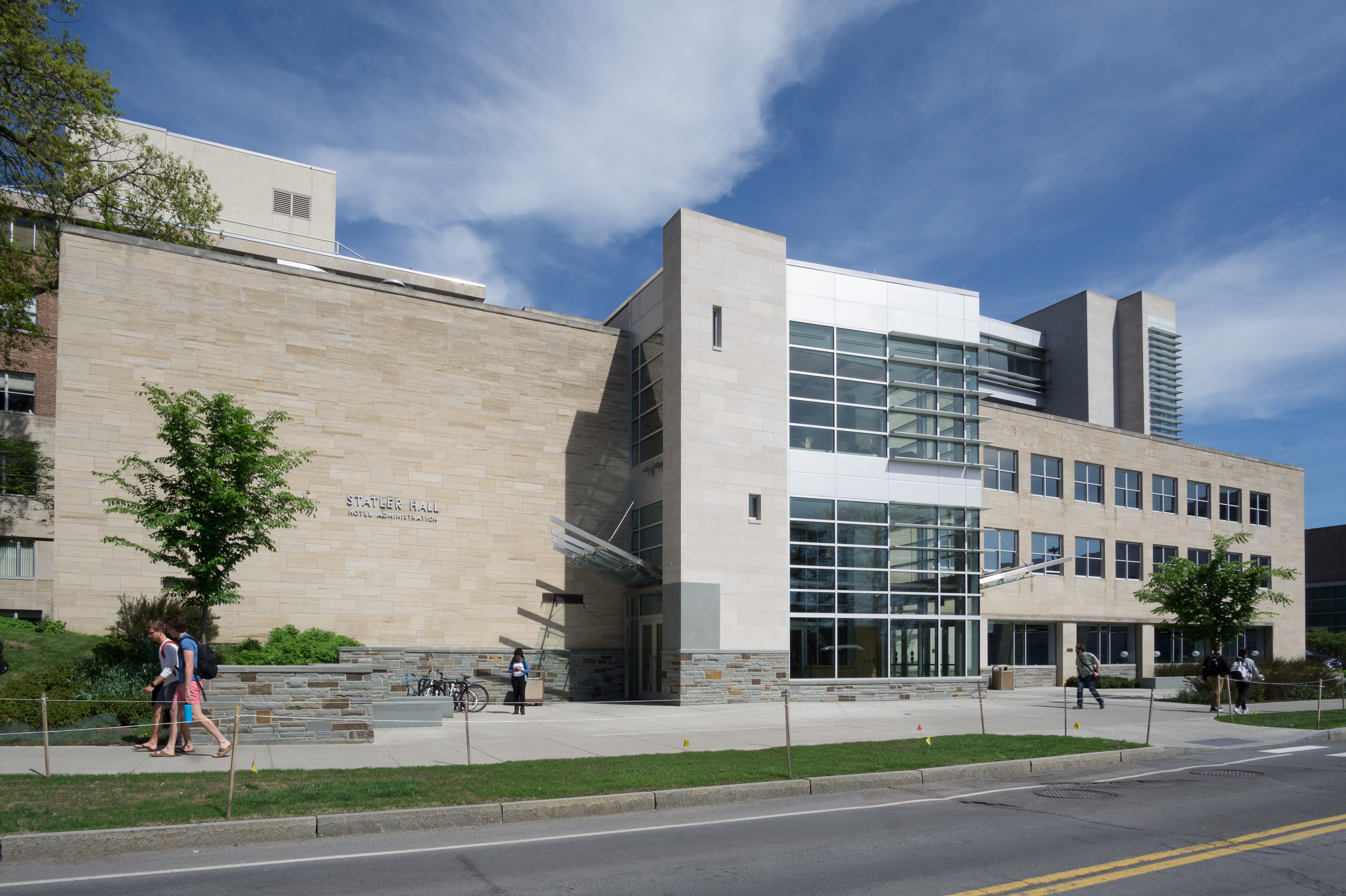
- Statler Hall, west facade along East Avenue
- Type: Private
- Established: 1922
- Dean: Kate Walsh
- Academic staff: 60
- Undergraduates: 894
- Postgraduates: 67
- Location: Ithaca, New York, U.S. 42.4458011°N 76.48158639999997°W
- Website: sha.cornell.edu

The Nolan School of Hotel Administration (SHA, more commonly known as the Hotel School) is a specialized business school in the SC Johnson College of Business at Cornell University, a private Ivy League university located in Ithaca, New York. Founded in 1922, it was the world's first four-year intercollegiate school devoted to hospitality management.

The undergraduate business curriculum at SHA is one of only three such Ivy League programs accredited by the Association to Advance Collegiate Schools of Business (AACSB). Students in the Hotel School are referred to as Hotelies. Participants come from all over the world to take classes at such locations as Ithaca, New York; Brussels, Belgium; Singapore; and site visits in Las Vegas and New York City.

== History ==
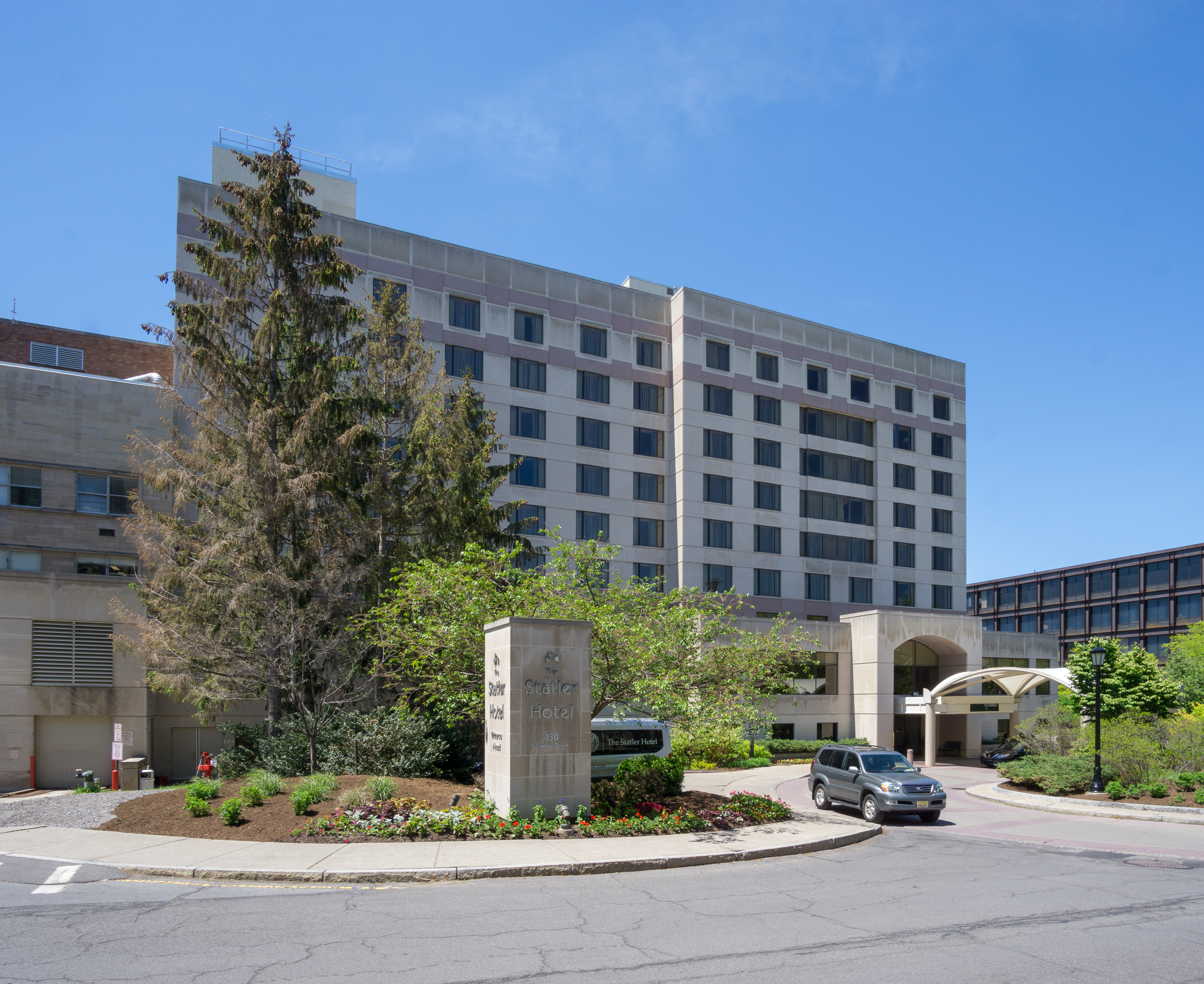
Statler Hotel entrance on Statler Drive

The nature of SHA was in large part the creation of professor Howard B. Meek. He was supported in his efforts by New York City hotel men, a number of whom testified in Albany, urging the legislature to appropriate $11,000 per year for the school. Edward M. Tierney of the Ansonia Hotel stated "There is a dearth of competent hotel employes [sic], and such a course at Cornell would have the endorsement and co-operation of the hotel men generally throughout the country... The war brought a great change in the hotel worker, and the old-time attitude of servility has been replaced by efficient service giving and courtesy. Young men now enter the hotel business just as they would banking, railroad, or commercial life, to find a future in it, and the hotel man must offer the same attractions of commensurate pay and advancement."

In 1927, at the 2nd Annual Hotel Ezra Cornell, Meek convinced a skeptical Ellsworth Milton Statler of the value of the concept; Statler declared "I'm converted. Meek can have any damn thing he wants." Statler and his wife became major benefactors of the school, eventually donating a total of more than $10 million. In 1950, the school was transformed from being a part of, Cornell's School of Home Economics (now the School of Human Ecology), a statutory college, into becoming a separate, endowed unit of Cornell.

In 1948, the Statler Foundation funded the construction of a 50-room Statler Inn and the adjoining class-room building called Statler Hall. The building also housed Cornell's faculty club. The 750-seat Alice Statler Auditorium was added to the southern end in 1956. In 1986, the original Statler Inn was torn down and replaced with the current 150-room Statler Hotel & J. Willard Marriott Executive Education Center. The Statler Hotel underwent another renovation in 2006 and now has 153 guest rooms. The Statler Hotel is the only hotel on campus.

On January 28, 2016, the Cornell Board of Trustees authorized the design and implementation of a plan for a Cornell College of Business, comprising the university's three exceptional accredited business schools: the Nolan School of Hotel Administration (SHA), the Charles H. Dyson School of Applied Economics and Management (Dyson), and the Samuel Curtis Johnson Graduate School of Management (Johnson). The new Cornell College of Business began enrollment in the fall of 2016.

== Profile ==
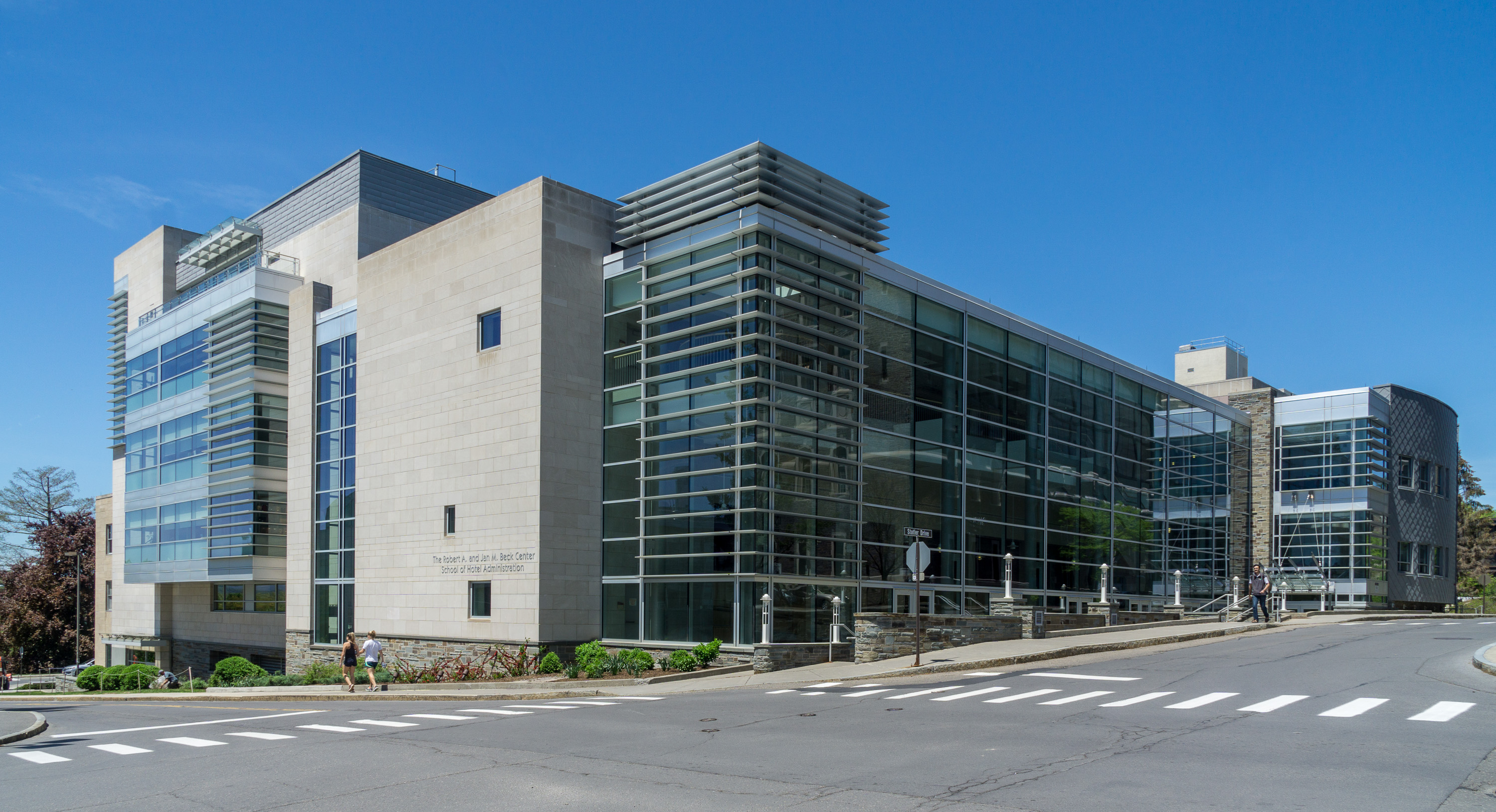
The Robert A. and Jan M. Beck Center addition to Statler Hall was dedicated in 2004

The school enrolled 895 undergraduates and 67 graduate students in 2011, hailing from almost 50 countries; it is Cornell's second smallest undergraduate college. Its curriculum encompasses all facets of general business management with a focus on the hospitality industry. SHA employs 65 full-time faculty members, most with field management experience.

SHA's course catalog includes several offerings for students in other Cornell colleges, notably HADM 4300, Introduction to Wines, a wine tasting course which enrolls 600–900 students each semester, as well as a 2-credit cooking course.

SHA also runs technical courses such as Real Estate Finance and Investments (HADM 4428), Securitization and Structured Finance (HADM 4425), and Investment Portfolio Analysis (HADM 4429). Roughly 40% of undergraduates go into banking or consulting fields after graduation.

Fictional Hotelies have included:

- In Absurdistan by Gary Shteyngart, a hotel manager attended the Cornell University Nolan School of Hotel Administration
- In Dirty Dancing, Neil graduated from Cornell's School of Hotel Management
- In Hotel by Arthur Hailey, Peter McDermott, manager of the St. Gregory.
- In 30 Rock, Tracy Jordan's friend, Fat Balls
- In Veep, Gary Walsh says he graduated with a degree in Hotel Management from Cornell University.

Some notable alumni of the school include the founders of Alamo Rent-A-Car; Arby's; Burger King; Dunkin' Donuts; billionaire and philanthropist Chuck Feeney of Duty Free Shoppers Group ; Shake Shack ; HVS Global Hospitality Services; Lyft and PriceWaterhouseCoopers Global Hospitality Consulting. (For more, List of Cornell University alumni)

== Statler Hotel ==
Lobby and students at the Statler Hotel

The full-service Statler Hotel has 153 guest rooms at the center of Cornell's campus. The hotel also serves as a primary teaching tool for the Nolan School of Hotel Administration. Each year more than 200 SHA students work at the Staler Hotel.

In 2011, 2012, and 2013, the Statler Hotel was awarded a 4-diamond rating by AAA. In January 2020, hotel executive Arthur Keith was named its new general manager.

== Center for Hospitality Research ==
The Cornell Center for Hospitality Research (CHR) is a service of the Cornell University Nolan School of Hotel Administration for the hospitality industry. With the support of industry partners the center promotes, supports, and distributes hospitality research. Three series of center publications are posted at no charge on its site chr.cornell.edu. They are Cornell Hospitality Reports, Cornell Hospitality Tools, and Industry Perspectives. In addition, the center is the publisher of the Cornell Hospitality Quarterly, now entering its sixth decade of publication, which is available by subscription only. The center's research agenda promotes studies that have direct implications for improving hospitality operations, but must be based on solid theoretical and procedural principles. The free reports and tools are more practitioner oriented, while the award-winning Quarterly includes more of the theory and educational content appropriate for students and academics. The center also produces a series of industry roundtables and participates in high level industry conferences to share research findings.

=== Publications ===
Cornell Hospitality Reports shares the knowledge created by center fellows and other researchers.

Cornell Hospitality Tools - web-based interactive tools for the hospitality industry.

Cornell Hospitality Quarterly - a leading academic journal for the hospitality industry.

Industry Perspective: A White Paper Series from Cornell - provide insight from hospitality industry leaders on the issues that matter most to senior executives and hospitality practitioners.

Hospitality Roundtable Proceedings - offer a thorough report on roundtable's deliberations.

Best Practices - identified and recognized Best Practive Champions across all segments of the U.S. lodging industry.

== Notable alumni ==
- Alan Rosen (born 1969), restaurant and bakery owner, and author
- John Zimmer, co-founder and former president of Lyft
