= List of songs written by Glenn Miller =

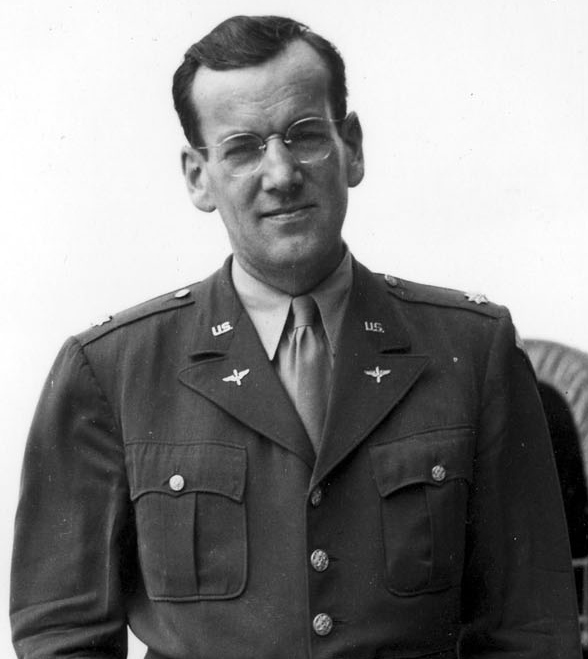
Major Glenn Miller, 1944

In addition to leading bands and playing the trombone, Glenn Miller composed music or lyrics to a number of songs. These and others were recorded by Miller with his pre-war civilian bands and his Army Air Forces Orchestra.

== Compositions ==
=== "Moonlight Serenade" ===
Glenn Miller composed the music to "Miller's Tune" in 1935. He changed the title to "Moonlight Serenade" when he created his unique "sound" with Glenn Miller and his Orchestra. Lyrics were added later by Mitchell Parish after two other sets of lyrics were written. "Moonlight Serenade" was Glenn Miller's theme for his radio programs between 1939 and 1942 (except for a brief period in 1941). This song has been covered by Frank Sinatra, Barry Manilow, Carly Simon, Charlie Haden, The Rivieras, Toots Thielemans, Kurt Elling, Bucky Pizzarelli, Bobby Vinton, Deodato, Count Basie and his Orchestra, Gene Krupa and his Orchestra, the Boston Pops with Arthur Fiedler, John Williams, and Keith Lockhart, each conducting during their time with the orchestra. Ray Conniff, Paul Mauriat, and the rock group Chicago have versions of "Moonlight Serenade" on a 1995 3 inch CD single in Japan and on the album Night & Day Big Band (1995). "Moonlight Serenade" appears in the films Rumor Has It… (2005) and The Aviator (2004).

It was released as a B-side to "Sunrise Serenade", written by Frankie Carle.

The record reached number three on the Billboard magazine chart and was the number five record of 1939 in the year-end chart in Billboard's later analysis, the record not originally charting because Billboard did not have a nation chart in 1939. The 1939 RCA recording was issued as a V-Disc in November 1943 by the U.S. War Department. The recording reached number twelve in the UK in March 1954, staying on the chart for one week. In a medley with "Little Brown Jug" and "In the Mood", "Moonlight Serenade" reached number thirteen on the UK charts in January 1976, where it stayed for eight weeks.

=== "Room 1411 (Goin' to Town)" ===
"Room 1411" was composed with Benny Goodman in 1928 when Glenn Miller was part of Benny Goodman's Boys, the instrumental was recorded on June 23, 1928, in Chicago, Illinois and was released as a 78 by Brunswick with "Jungle Blues". Benny Goodman's Boys consisted of Miller on trombone, Tommy Dorsey on trombone, who is not on the "Room 1411" recording, Dick "Icky" Morgan on guitar, Bud Freeman on tenor saxophone, Harry Goodman on bass and tuba, Fud Livingston on clarinet and tenor saxophone, Wingy Manone on trumpet, Jimmy McPartland on cornet, Ben Pollack on drums, Vic Briedis on piano, Harry Goodman on bass and tuba, and Benny Goodman on clarinet, saxophone, and cornet. On the January 1928 recording sessions, the band was referred to as "Benny Goodman's Boys with Jim and Glenn". The band continued to record in 1928 and 1929. Miller and Goodman lived in the same suite at the time in the apartments in The Whitby in New York whose number was 1411. In Hear Me Talkin' to Ya: The Story of Jazz as Told by the Men Who Made It (1955) by Nat Shapiro and Nat Hentoff, Jimmy McPartland recalled how the title originated: "[A]fter a couple of weeks we moved into the Whitby Apartments, where Gil Rodin, Dick Morgan, Benny Goodman, and Glenn Miller had a suite. We all moved into that, practically the whole band...The number of that apartment was 1411. And that is how that title came up, "Room 1411", by Benny Goodman's Boys." Goodman played baritone saxophone "on the more straight-ahead Chicago-style 'Room 1411'". "Room 1411 (Goin' to Town)" is Glenn Miller's first known composition. Two versions of the instrumental were released. The recording was reissued in 1949 as part of the Brunswick Collectors' Series.

=== "Sold American" ===
"Sold American" was composed in 1938 by Glenn Miller and John Chalmers "Chummy" MacGregor, the pianist in the Glenn Miller Orchestra. The title was recorded on May 23, 1938, for Brunswick and again on June 27, 1939, for RCA Victor. A 78 was released in 1938 as Brunswick 8173 with "Dipper Mouth Blues". In 1939, a new recording was released as a Bluebird 78 A side, 10352A, with "Pagan Love Song". The title is based on an American Tobacco Company radio ad jingle of the 1930s for Lucky Strike cigarettes with a tobacco auctioneer chant delivered by North Carolina tobacco auctioneer Lee Aubrey "Speed" Riggs which ended with the phrase, "Sold, American!", stressing that American only purchased the highest quality tobacco for its cigarettes. The song was performed live by Glenn Miller on March 8, 1939, and broadcast on the radio from a remote at the Meadowbrook Ballroom in Cedar Grove, New Jersey. "Sold American" was released as a single in the UK paired with "Moon Love" on the His Master's Voice label as BD5854.

=== "Solo Hop" ===
"Solo Hop" was a Top Ten hit from the summer of 1935, according to the official Glenn Miller Orchestra web site. Miller composed this for a pick-up band when he started recording for Columbia Records. "Solo Hop" included Bunny Berigan on trumpet, Claude Thornhill on piano, and Charlie Spivak on trumpet. It was released by Columbia as a single backed with "In a Little Spanish Town", label number CO-3058-D. According to the tsort.info, a website that accesses Billboard chart statistics, based on the research of Billboard chart analyst Joel Whitburn, "Solo Hop" reached number seven on the Billboard chart in 1935, staying on the chart for five weeks. George Simon, a friend of Miller, contradicts sources that say it was a top ten hit and says it was barely noticed by record buyers.

=== "Introduction to a Waltz" ===
"Introduction to a Waltz" was an instrumental composition written with Jerry Gray and Hal Dickinson in 1941 that was never commercially recorded for Bluebird. Two airchecks were issued, one from December 11, 1941, on LPT-6700 from a Chesterfield Broadcast. The other is from March 20, 1942, also from a Chesterfield Broadcast issued on LPT-3001. "'Introduction to a Waltz' has quite an introduction – 187 bars to be exact, with 8 bars of 'waltz' near the end of the tune." The performances included Billy May on trumpet, Tex Beneke on tenor saxophone, Chummy MacGregor on piano, and Moe Purtill on drums. Jerry Gray and his Orchestra released a version of the instrumental backed with "V Hop" in 1951 as a Decca 45, 27869, and as a 78, from the album A Tribute to Glenn Miller. Larry O'Brien and the Glenn Miller Orchestra recorded the instrumental on the 2006 album Steppin' Out. The Jack Million Band recorded the instrumental on their album In the Mood for Glenn Miller, Volume 1 in 2006.

=== "Annie's Cousin Fannie" ===
"Annie's Cousin Fannie", which is sometimes listed as "Annie's Cousin Fanny" or as "Annie's Cousin Fannie is a Sweetie of Mine" from 1934, was written for the Dorsey Brothers Band and was recorded three times, first on June 4, 1934, in New York when Glenn Miller was part of the band and released by Brunswick b/w "Judy" and by Decca as the A side with "Dr. Heckle and Mr. Jibe" as the B side. The record also appears as "Annie's Cousin Fannie is a Sweetie of Mine" sung by Kay Weber, one of the first female singers of the Big Band Era, and Glenn Miller, who had discovered her. The Dorsey Band recorded three different versions of the song in June and August 1934, released on Brunswick and later on Decca.

=== "Dese Dem Dose" ===
"Dese Dem Dose" was composed by Glenn Miller in 1935 for the Dorsey Brothers Band, was recorded in New York on February 6, 1935, and was released as a 78 on Decca paired with "Weary Blues" as Decca 469. Ray McKinley, a drummer in the Dorsey Brothers band, recalled: "Glenn did write a few things for us. I remember one thing called 'Dese, Dem and Dose' that he wrote and we recorded. He used to carry a little organ around with him to work on." (Simon, page 65) Ray Noble and his American Dance Orchestra performed "Dese Dem Dose" as part of a medley, "Dese Dem Dose/An Hour Ago This Minute/Solitude", on April 17, 1935, live at the Rainbow Room in New York which was recorded and broadcast and released in 2008 on the live CD by Galaxy Music The Rainbow Room New York Presents. Miller was in the Ray Noble orchestra at the time on trombone. Miller also appeared with the Ray Noble Orchestra that year in the Hollywood movie musical The Big Broadcast of 1936 (1935).

=== "When Icky Morgan Plays the Organ" ===
"When Icky Morgan Plays the Organ" was a novelty song composed with lyrics and recorded by Glenn Miller in 1935 when he was a member of the Clark Randall Orchestra, which included Bob Crosby, Gil Rodin, and singer Frank Tennille, the father of Toni Tennille of the Captain and Tennille, whose pseudonym was Clark Randall. The title of the song comes from a slang expression used by Dick Morgan, an eccentric member of the Ben Pollack orchestra. Morgan was the banjo and guitar player in the band who used a replica of a python in his act. George Simon recalled how the song came about: "Glenn composed one of the songs, "When Icky Morgan Plays the Organ, Look Out!" — dedicated to his good friend Dick Morgan, who had played guitar in Pollack's band." Miller recorded ten songs with the Clark Randall orchestra in March 1935. "Icky Morgan" was released as a Brunswick 10 inch 78 single in 1935 as Brunswick 7415 backed with "Troublesome Trumpet". The song appears on the 2001 compilation album Bob Crosby and His Orchestra: And Then Some, Parts 1 and 2 of the Complete Discography on Halcyon, HALC 142, and the 2005 compilation series The Glenn Miller Story, Vol. 1-2 on Avid Entertainment.

=== "Doin' the Jive" ===
"Doin' the Jive" was composed by Glenn Miller and Chummy MacGregor in 1937 and recorded for Brunswick on November 29, 1937, and released as Brunswick 8063 with "Humoresque" and as Vocalion 5131 with "Dipper Mouth Blues", was a song with lyrics that introduced a new dance, "The Jive": "You clap your hands/And you swing out wide/Do the Suzie Q/ Mix in a step or two/Put 'em all together/And you're doin' the jive". There is dialogue between Miller and MacGregor. The solos are by Jerry Jerome on tenor sax and Irving Fazola on clarinet. A second version was released with Tex Beneke in the dialogue with Miller from a June 20, 1938 NBC radio broadcast from the Paradise Restaurant in New York City with Gail Reese on lead vocals. Simon reviewed the song in March, 1938, in Metronome magazine describing it as "much swing, fun, and good Kitty Lane singing." The band contributes vocals with Miller and MacGregor. The song was arranged by Miller. Belgian bandleader Emile Deltour, under the pseudonym Eddie Tower, recorded a version on November 10, 1940, which was released as a Telefunken 78 single, A10232. [Best of Big Bands: Evolution of a Band, Glenn Miller, Sony, 1992.]

=== "Community Swing" ===
"Community Swing" was composed by Glenn Miller in 1937 and recorded on June 9, 1937, on Brunswick and released as a 78, 7923, with "Sleepy Time Gal". The instrumental featured Mannie Klein on trumpet, Hal McIntyre on clarinet, and Eak Kenyon on drums. The 78 release on Vocalion in the UK, S-127, B-21236-1, was reviewed in the February, 1938 issue of the British classical music magazine Gramophone: "'Community Swing' as a composition is more on the call-and-answer principle... But even here one finds Miller's penchant for quality and richness of tone, and the same nice, clean straightforward phrasing." Paul Eduard Miller reviewed the composition in the August, 1937 issue of Down Beat: "Miller's own tune, is a snappy arrangement, ensemble for the most part." [Best of Big Bands: Evolution of a Band, Glenn Miller, Sony, 1992.]

=== "Sometime" ===
"Sometime" was a pop ballad with lyrics and music composed by Glenn Miller with Chummy MacGregor in 1939 and sung by Ray Eberle according to John Flower. The published musical score, copyrighted on September 27, 1940 lists the composers as Glenn Miller, Chummy MacGregor, and lyricist Mitchell Parish. "Sometime" was performed for radio broadcast and two airchecks have been released of the song. "Sometime" was first performed on March 5, 1939, at the Meadowbrook Ballroom in Cedar Grove, New Jersey. The song was also performed at the Meadowbrook on March 26, April 7, and April 18, 1939, which recording was released as Victor LPM/LSP 2769 and 6101, "Glenn Miller on the Air", and RCA RD/SF 7612. The announcer introduced the song as follows: "Now comes a number that was originated right here in the band. Glenn and Mac the piano player got together and wrote it. Ray Eberle sings it. The title: 'Sometime'." This song is different from the Gus Kahn and Ted Fiorito song of the same name from 1925 and the 1918 Rudolf Friml and Rida Johnson Young song. [Glenn Miller: The Broadcast Archives: Volumes 1 and 2. Avid Entertainment, 2005.]

=== "Boom Shot" ===
"Boom Shot" was composed by Glenn Miller with Billy May. May is credited as his first wife, Arletta May, because he had signed an exclusive composer's contract with Charlie Barnet that forbade him for writing anything for Miller under his own name. This song was written in 1942 and recorded for the Twentieth Century Fox movie Orchestra Wives. "Boom Shot" is shown in two scenes, once on the jukebox in the soda shop, then during the dance scene with Harry Morgan and Ann Rutherford although it is uncredited on the soundtrack for the film. The title comes from the wide-angle, mobile camera shot used to film the scene, known as a boom shot. The arrangement is by George Williams. The Jack Million Band recorded it on the album In the Mood for Glenn Miller, Vol. 2. "Boom Shot" was included on the 1959 double LP released by Twentieth Century Fox entitled Glenn Miller and His Orchestra, TCF 100–2, which included music from the Orchestra Wives and Sun Valley Serenade movies. In May, 1959, "Boom Shot" was released as a 7" vinyl 45 single by the British Top Rank label with "You Say the Sweetest Things, Baby" by the Glenn Miller Six as JAR-114 in conjunction with 20th Century Fox. "Boom Shot" features a trumpet solo by Johnny Best, which is edited out in the film, with Billy May on muted trumpet, Ernie Caceres on alto saxophone, and Glenn Miller on trombone. Ray McKinley and the New Glenn Miller Orchestra recorded the song as "Boomshot" on the 1959 RCA Victor LP album Dance Anyone? In 2006 the Jack Million Band recorded "Boom Shot" on the album In the Miller Mood Vol. 2.

=== "Seven-O-Five" ===
"Seven-O-Five" or "7-0-5" or "705" was an instrumental composed by Glenn Miller, arranged by Jerry Gray, and performed with the Army Air Forces Training Command Band in several different versions and was recorded for release as a V-Disc. A V-Disc test pressing was made from the November 10, 1945 recording of "7-0-5". The title "7-0-5" refers to the number of the score in the Glenn Miller music library. Each score had a number in the system that Miller and his arrangers devised. It was published as "Rock and Ride". The other titles that were used for the composition included "Goofin' Off" and "Jivin' the Blues". No title was decided upon so the score number was retained. "7-0-5" was performed, recorded, and broadcast on the I Sustain the Wings radio program, Program No.15, on May 5, 1944, and on November 10, 1945. Larry O'Brien and the Glenn Miller Orchestra recorded the song on the 2006 album Steppin' Out.

=== "I Sustain the Wings" ===
"I Sustain the Wings" was composed by Glenn Miller, Chummy MacGregor, Norman Leyden and Bill Meyers. This was the theme song for the radio program that was broadcast weekly on Saturdays on NBC from June 1943 to June 10, 1944, by the Glenn Miller Army Air Forces Orchestra under the direction of then-Captain Glenn Miller. The radio show was on CBS. Miller was the host and conductor on the show, which also featured Ray McKinley, Jerry Gray, Johnny Desmond, and the Crew Chiefs, until June 10, 1944, when Harry Bluestone became the conductor. The Latin "Sustineo Alas", "I Sustain the Wings", or "Keep 'Em Flying", was the motto of the U.S. Army Air Forces Technical Training Command. The I Sustain the Wings radio series continued until November 17, 1945. Major Glenn Miller and the American Band of the Allied Expeditionary Force also made recordings for the BBC and the Office of War Information (OWI) from October 30 to November 20, 1944, at Abbey Road Studios in London that were broadcast over the American Broadcasting Station in Europe to Germany in a program called Music for the Wehrmacht or The Wehrmacht Hour. General James H. Doolittle, Commanding General of the US 8th Army Air Forces, told Miller: "Captain Miller, next to a letter from home your organization is the greatest morale-builder in the European Theater of Operations."

The song also contained lyrics. The opening lines are: "For the land that I love, I sustain the wings/ In the sky above where they fight to victory/ There's a plane in the sky, and the song it sings/ Is the freedom cry and a pray'r for you and me." The sheet music for the composition appeared in the 1943 songbook Glenn Miller's Dance Folio published by the Mutual Music Society in New York.

=== "I Swung the Election" ===
Glenn Miller is credited with writing the song "I Swung the Election" which was recorded by Jack Teagarden and his Orchestra in 1939. Teagarden recorded the song on July 19, 1939, in New York and released it as a 78 single as Columbia 35206 b/w "Aunt Hagar's Blues" and as a V-Disc, No. 823B, issued in January, 1948, with the composer on the label listed as "Glenn Miller". Teagarden sang and played trombone on the recording.

=== "Wings on Parade: The Flaming Sword of Liberation" ===
"Wings on Parade" was a "musical work" posthumously copyrighted on September 21, 1951, as a "piano solo" by Glenn Miller. The alternate title is "The Flaming Sword of Liberation" which was copyrighted on July 15, 1944, and published by the Mutual Music Society. The "Copyright Claimant" is listed as Steven D. Miller, Glenn Miller's adopted son. The copyright was renewed on January 10, 1979. The song was performed on July 9, 1944, by Captain Glenn Miller and the American Band of the Supreme Allied Command for radio broadcast.

=== "I'm Headin' for California" ===
Based on the ASCAP database, "I'm Headin' for California" was written by Glenn Miller with Arthur Malvin, a member of the Crew Chiefs, copyrighted on September 21, 1944, and published by the Chappell Co., Inc. The song was released as a 78 single, RCA Victor 20–1834, b/w "Swing Low, Sweet Chariot" by the Glenn Miller Orchestra led by Tex Beneke in 1946 and as an His Master's Voice 78, BD 5956, in the UK in 1947 b/w "Texas Tex". The Billboard issue of March 30, 1946 lists Glenn Miller and Arthur Malvin as the composers: "Mated is a pleasant plattering of 'I'm Headin' for California,' a rhythmic ditty with Arthur Malvin, the band's romantic voice, and the late maestro authored after the fashion of 'Chattanooga Choo Choo.'" The recording was reviewed in the Billboard Data and Reviews section: "An infectious rhythm ditty fashioned along the same lines as 'Chattanooga Choo Choo' and cut in crisp manner by the ex-G.I. gang now led by Tex Beneke, who is joined by the harmonies of the Crew Chiefs, a mixed crew, for this lively chant....It's spry syncopating with the throaty singing of Tex Beneke assisted by the finely blended voices of the Crew Chiefs."

The song was first performed by the dance band of the AAF orchestra and sung by Ray McKinley when Glenn Miller was in England in 1944. The Major Glenn Miller Army Air Forces Orchestra performed the song on the Swing Shift program on December 4, 1944.

=== "Morning Mood" ===
Glenn Miller co-wrote "Morning Mood" with composer Bert Reisfeld as a trombone solo with piano forte accompaniment which was copyrighted by the Mutual Music Society on September 2, 1941, in New York based on the ASCAP database. The royalty was split half to each. There are no known performances.

=== "After Tonight" ===
The song "After Tonight" was copyrighted as a musical composition on December 5, 1939, with "melody" by Glenn Miller and words by Ted Fetter in New York, published by the Robbins Music Corporation. The song was published in the June 1940 issue of Radio and Television Mirror on pages 23–24. Broadway lyricist Ted Fetter co-wrote the lyrics to the 1940 standard "Taking a Chance on Love" with Vernon Duke and John La Touche. The copyright was renewed on December 5, 1966, by Helen Miller and Ted Fetter.

=== "The Technical Training Command" ===
"The Technical Training Command" was a theme song written for the AAFTC Orchestra and used at the close of early I Sustain the Wings radio programs in 1943. The theme was dropped after six weeks. Recordings of each performance exist. The composers are Captain Glenn Miller, John Chummy MacGregor, and Private Sol Meyer. The song contained lyrics. The opening line is: "Who keeps the planes on high/ Blazing across the sky/ Who checks 'em when they land/ The Technical Training Command." The royalty was split three ways. Miller gave all of his royalty receipts to the Air Forces Aid and later to the Red Cross. The sheet music for the composition appeared in the 1943 songbook Glenn Miller's Dance Folio published by the Mutual Music Society in New York.

=== "Jinky" ===
"Jinky" was composed in 1933 when Miller worked with vocalist Smith Ballew. It is score #62 in the Glenn Miller musical score library. The song was performed by Smith Bellew and His Orchestra in 1933 but not recorded.

=== "Let's Give Them a Break" ===
"Let's Give Them a Break" was performed once in October 1937 but was not recorded. The lyrics were published in a Minneapolis newspaper on 3–30 October 1937. The song was presented to the local Community Fund organization.

=== "SHAEF Presents" ===
"SHAEF Presents" was written as a theme for the American Band of the AEF program which aired on the Allied Expeditionary Forces Programme (AEFP) radio network in 1944. It was not used. It was composed by Captain Glenn Miller and arranged by Sgt. Jerry Gray. SHAEF was the Supreme Headquarters Allied Expeditionary Force. There are no recordings of the score. Arranger and clarinetist, Norman Leyden and other military personnel confirmed that the final name of this band was the Major Glenn Miller Army Air Forces Orchestra before it was carved in stone at their memorial tree in section 13 at Arlington National Cemetery.

=== "Chesterfield #1" ===
"Chesterfield #1", also referred to as "Fast One", was incidental music for commercial breaks written in 1941 for the Chesterfield Moonlight Serenade radio program. It was performed on 10 Chesterfield shows. The score number is 617. These broadcasts were recorded. The song was broadcast on the following Chesterfield radio shows: June 18, 1941, June 19, 1941, June 24, 1941, June 25, 1941, June 26, 1941, July 1, 1941, July 2, 1941, July 3, 1941, and July 8, 1941.

=== "Chesterfield #2" ===
"Chesterfield #2" was incidental music performed twice on the Chesterfield radio show in 1941. Harold Dickinson of The Modernaires shares credit for the vocal part while Miller wrote the music. The broadcasts were recorded. The song was broadcast on the following Chesterfield radio shows: June 18, 1941 and June 19, 1941.

=== "125 Jazz Breaks for Trombone" ===
"125 Jazz Breaks for Trombone" was copyrighted in 1927 as Glenn Miller's 125 Jazz Breaks for Trombone by the Melrose Brothers Music Company: The House That Blues Built, 177 North State Street, Chicago, Illinois. The score was published in the UK in London by Herman Darewski Music Pub. Co., in 1941. The songbook was softcover and measured 6 3/4 X 10 inches. It consisted of 22 pages. Glenn Miller is pictured on the cover in a black and white photograph. The cover illustration is signed with the initials N.E.K. The rear cover has ads for other Melrose Brothers Music Company publications including ones for Dixieland, Book of Blues, Benny Goodman, Louis Armstrong, and Jelly Roll Morton. In the publisher's forward it discussed the art of playing jazz, mentioning "Glenn Miller, feature trombonist of Ben Pollack's Victor Recording Orchestra, and author of this book, is recognized everywhere as a finished artist." The back cover contained the description: "Glenn Miller is a feature trombonist with Ben Pollack's Victor Recording Orchestra. Professional musicians everywhere recommend this book. Price: $1.00." The sheet music was advertised in the 1928 "Billboard", Volume 40, Page 202. "The Jazz Breaks are works of recognized Jazz artists who have made national reputations. JAZZ BREAKS. Benny Goodman's 125 Jazz Breaks for Sax and Clarinet. $1.00. GLENN MILLER'S 125 Jazz Breaks for Trombone. $1.00." An ad for the sheet music also appeared in the 1928 "Metronome", Volume 44, Page 42.

=== "You're Breakin' Me Down" ===
"You're Breakin' Me Down" is a musical composition by Miller with cornetist, composer, and bandleader Red Nichols. There are no known recordings. The song was performed by Red Nichols and His Five Pennies.

=== "Tomorrow's Another Day" ===
"Tomorrow's Another Day" is a song Miller composed in 1935 for the Dorsey Brothers Orchestra. Miller copyrighted the song with the U.S. Library of Congress on January 23, 1935. The Dorsey Brothers released the song as an A side 78 single in 1935 on Decca Records. The B side was "I've Got Your Number" written by Bonnie Lake. The song, arranged by Glenn Miller, was recorded on February 6, 1935, in New York. Kay Weber was the vocalist. Glenn Miller was not on the recording session.

=== "Harlem Chapel Chimes" ===
"Harlem Chapel Chimes" is a song Miller composed in 1935. The song was recorded by the Dorsey Brothers Orchestra on February 6, 1935, in New York and released as a 78 single. Two versions were released: 39337-A was released on Brunswick in the UK as 02149 backed with "Weary Blues", while 39337-C was released on Decca as BM-02149. Miller was not on the studio recording session. The Dorsey Brother's version was arranged by Miller.

=== "Basin Street Blues" ===
Glenn Miller is credited with writing an additional verse for the song "Basin Street Blues" in 1931, written in 1928 by Spencer Williams. Miller arranged the song for a February 9, 1931 recording under the direction of Benny Goodman in New York with the Charleston Chasers which was released as a 78 single as Columbia 2415-D and Okeh 41577. Miller wrote the following additional verse to the song in collaboration with Jack Teagarden, which was incorporated in later recordings of the song:

"Won't you come along with me, To the Mississippi, We'll take a boat to the land of dreams, steam down the river to New Orleans. The band's there to greet us, Old friends there to meet us. Where the rich and the poor folks meet, let me take you down to Basin Street."

Jack Teagarden explained how the lyrics were co-written with Glenn Miller in 1931:

"I was home in New York the evening before the 'Basin Street Blues' record date when Glenn called me from his apartment in Jackson Heights. 'Jack, I think we could do a better job if we could put together some lyrics and you could sing it. Want to come over and see what we can do?'...We finally finished the job sometime early in the morning. Next day, we cut the record. It's been the most popular I've ever done! The lyrics were later included with the sheet music, but it never carried our names."
