= Glenn Miller discography =

Glenn Miller and His Orchestra discography
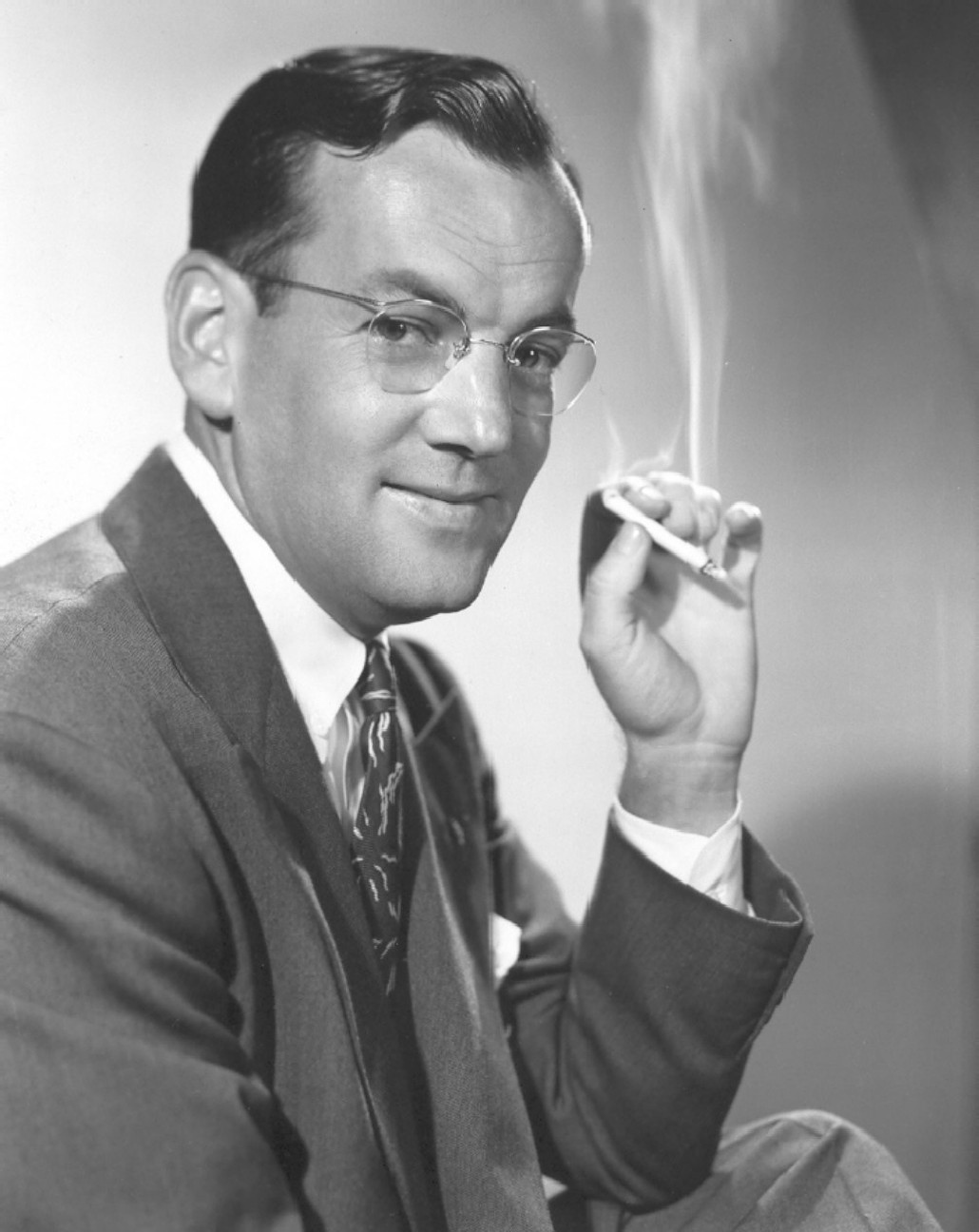
- Glenn Miller, 1941
- Singles: 266
- V-Discs: 24
- EPs: 37
- Soundtracks: 2
- Box sets: 6

Between 1938 and 1944, Glenn Miller and His Orchestra released 266 singles on the monaural ten-inch shellac 78 rpm format. Their studio output comprised a variety of musical styles inside of the Swing genre, including ballads, band chants, dance instrumentals, novelty tracks, songs adapted from motion pictures, and, as the Second World War approached, patriotic music.

Non-instrumental songs featured Miller's various vocalists, generally Ray Eberle or Marion Hutton before 1940, with Tex Beneke, vocal group The Modernaires, and Skip Nelson all making studio vocal appearances after the turn of the decade. Beginning with An Album of Outstanding Arrangements in 1945, this collection has been repackaged into various album formats over time with release on 78 rpm, 10 and 12 inch LP, 7 inch 45 rpm, compact cassette, 8-track, compact disc (CD), and digital formats.

Before his popularity, in the late 1920s, Miller played or wrote arrangements for many hot jazz groups, including a stint as a trombonist-arranger for Red Nichols’ famed Five Pennies recordings.

== Charted singles and selected discography, 1938–1942 ==
Chart is sorted by order of individual song debut date.

Year	Single	Peak chart position	Total weeks charted	Background
Year	Single	U.S.	Total weeks charted	Background
1938	"My Reverie"	11	3	Recorded September 27, 1938, with vocals by Ray Eberle, "My Reverie" was the first release by the reformed Glenn Miller Orchestra on Victor Bluebird. Larry Clinton released a popular version of it the same year with Bea Wain on vocals, writing lyrics to Claude Debussy's Reverie. According to George Simon, the original arrangement was to be an instrumental, but a producer at RCA Victor wanted Glenn Miller to play a solo trombone a'la Tommy Dorsey, with a Ray Eberle vocal. The B side was "King Porter Stomp".
1939	"Moonlight Serenade"	3	15	Instrumental. Miller's theme song, and a favorite of the swing era. Composed by Miller himself, as "Now I Lay Me Down to Weep", out of a Joseph Schillinger exercise, it was number three for 1 week.
1939	"Sunrise Serenade"	7	11	Instrumental. Flip side of "Moonlight Serenade" and Frankie Carle's composition and theme song.
1939	"Wishing (Will Make It So)"	1	14	Vocal by Ray Eberle, written by Buddy G. DeSylva, from the RKO movie Love Affair. Number one for four weeks.
1939	"The Lady's In Love With You"	2	12	Call and response vocal by Glenn Miller and Ray Eberle. Number two for 1 week.
1939	"My Last Goodbye"	13	2	
1939	"Runnin' Wild"	12	1	An instrumental, arranged by Bill Finegan and recorded by Miller in 1939. It was also a standard that ended up twenty years later in the United Artists movie Some Like It Hot with Marilyn Monroe, directed by Billy Wilder.
1939	"Stairway To The Stars"	1	13	Vocal by Ray Eberle. Number one for 4 weeks.
1939	"Little Brown Jug"	10	7	Instrumental. Traditional, although the songwriting credit is sometimes assigned to Joseph Eastburn Winner, who published a version in 1869. Arranged by Bill Finegan, it was recorded April 10, 1939. The Glenn Miller Story takes dramatic license and gives the date of the arrangement as 1944, as a surprise for Helen Miller for a Christmas Day broadcast by the Army Air Force band from Europe.
1939	"Moon Love"	1	16	Vocal by Ray Eberle, Based on Tchaikovsky's Symphony No.5 in E Minor, Op.64. Number one for 4 weeks.
1939	"Cinderella (Stay In My Arms)"	16	2	
1939	"Back To Back"	8	5	Vocal by Marion Hutton.
1939	"Ain't Cha Comin' Out?"	8	2	
1939	"Over The Rainbow"	1	15	Vocal by Ray Eberle, from the MGM movie The Wizard of Oz. Number one for 7 weeks.
1939	"Ding-Dong! The Witch Is Dead"	17	2	Vocal by Marion Hutton, from the MGM movie The Wizard of Oz. Flip side of "Over the Rainbow".
1939	"The Little Man Who Wasn't There"	7	11	Vocal by Ray Eberle. Halloween song. Flip side of "The Man With the Mandolin".
1939	"The Man With The Mandolin"	1	10	Vocal by Marion Hutton. Number one for 3 weeks.
1939	"Blue Orchids"	1	12	Vocal by Ray Eberle. Number one for 1 week.
1939	"My Isle Of Golden Dreams"	15	1	Instrumental.
1939	"In The Mood"	1	28	Instrumental. Number one for 13 weeks. "In The Mood" had a long history, even before Glenn Miller recorded it. Composition was credited to Jerry Gray, but fragments of the song had been found in earlier recordings dating back to the early 1930s. The 1939 Bluebird recording was also released as V-Disc 123B in February 1944. A version was also released as V-Disc 842B in May 1948 by Glenn Miller and Overseas Band by the U.S. War Department.
1939	"Melancholy Lullaby"	15	3	
1939	"My Prayer"	3	7	Vocal by Ray Eberle. Number three for 1 week.
1939	"Speaking Of Heaven"	8	7	
1939	"(Why Couldn't It Last) Last Night"	7	3	
1939	"Bluebirds In The Moonlight (Silly Idea)"	9	2	
1940	"Vagabond Dreams"	16	1	
1940	"This Changing World"	8	6	
1940	"Careless"	2	11	Vocal by Ray Eberle. Number two for 9 weeks.
1940	"Indian Summer"	8	10	
1940	"Faithful Forever"	5	3	
1940	"The Gaucho Serenade"	7	2	
1940	"Danny Boy (Londonderry Air)"	17	2	Instrumental. An adaptation of Londonderry Air, "Danny Boy" was arranged by Glenn Miller and Chummy MacGregor. The Bluebird 78 single made Billboard's chart in 1940, staying for 2 weeks.
1940	"Ooh! What You Said"	13	6	
1940	"Tuxedo Junction"	1	17	Instrumental. Selling a reported 110,000 pressings the first week of its availability, "Tuxedo Junction" was number one for nine weeks on Billboard's Juke Box chart. Buddy Feyne added lyrics. Glenn Miller copyrighted his arrangement of the song on February 8, 1940.
1940	"In An Old Dutch Garden (By An Old Dutch Mill)"	8	2	
1940	"It's A Blue World"	14	4	
1940	"When You Wish Upon A Star"	2	7	Vocal by Ray Eberle, written by Ned Washington and Leigh Harline for Pinocchio in 1940. Number two for 5 weeks.
1940	"Say "Si Si" (Para Vigo Me Voy)"	14	4	Vocal by Marion Hutton.
1940	"Starlit Hour"	10	1	
1940	"The Woodpecker Song"	1	14	Vocal by Marion Hutton, written by Eldo Di Lazzaro and Harold Adamson. Number one for 5 weeks.
1940	"The Sky Fell Down"	16	2	
1940	"Boog It"	7	5	
1940	"Alice Blue Gown"	18	2	
1940	"I'm Stepping Out With A Memory Tonight"	7	6	
1940	"Say It"	7	4	
1940	"Imagination"	2	8	Vocal by Ray Eberle, Number two for 2 weeks.
1940	"Slow Freight"	9	3	
1940	"Hear My Song, Violetta"	9	8	
1940	"Shake Down The Stars"	10	1	
1940	"Fools Rush In (Where Angels Fear To Tread)"	3	7	Vocal by Ray Eberle, written by Johnny Mercer and Rube Bloom.
1940	"Pennsylvania Six-Five Thousand"	5	6	Featuring a band chant vocal, written by Jerry Gray and Carl Sigman, Pennsylvania Six-Five Thousand reached number five on Billboard's charts on August 31, 1940; Retrospectively one of Miller's most popular and enduring songs.
1940	"Devil May Care"	16	2	
1940	"The Nearness Of You"	5	8	Vocal by Ray Eberle. Written by Hoagy Carmicheal, lyrics by Ned Washington. "The Bluebird label recording was a moderate success, appearing on the pop charts at the end of June [1940]..."
1940	"Sierra Sue"	17	1	
1940	"Blueberry Hill"	2	14	Vocal by Ray Eberle. Number two for 4 weeks. Later became Fats Domino's most popular hit.
1940	"I'll Never Smile Again"	17	1	
1940	"When the Swallows Come Back To Capistrano"	10	1	
1940	"Crosstown"	9	1	Vocal by Jack Lathrop. Written by James Cavanaugh, John Redmond, and Nat Simon, "Crosstown" reached number nine on the Billboard Best Sellers chart on October 5, 1940.
1940	"Our Love Affair"	8	2	
1940	"The Call Of The Canyon"	10	1	
1940	"Beat Me Daddy, Eight To A Bar"	15	1	Vocal by Vocal by Jack Lathrop. Written by Don Raye, Hughie Prince, and Ray McKinley, under his wife's maiden name Eleanore Sheehy; Ray McKinley would later lead the official tribute Glenn Miller Orchestra.
1940	"A Handful Of Stars"	10	2	
1940	"A Nightingale Sang In Berkeley Square"	2	6	Vocal by Ray Eberle. Number two for 2 weeks.
1941	"Anvil Chorus, Part One / Anvil Chorus, Part Two"	3	10	Instrumental. Arranged by Jerry Gray, adapted from the Giuseppe Verdi opera Il Trovatore.
1941	"Five O'Clock Whistle"	6	2	
1941	"Along The Santa Fe Trail"	7	4	
1941	"Frenesi"	18	2	Instrumental.
1941	"Song Of The Volga Boatmen"	1	8	Instrumental. Based on a Russian folk song; Number one for 1 week on the Billboard Best Sellers chart in 1941.
1941	"I Dreamt I Dwelt In Harlem"	3	4	Instrumental. Music written by Jerry Gray, Ben Smith and Leonard Ware, lyrics by Robert B. Wright, the pseudonym of Buddy Feyne, who also wrote the lyrics to "Tuxedo Junction". The single reached number three on the Billboard Best Sellers chart on April 5, 1941, staying five weeks total.
1941	"Perfidia"	13	4	Vocal by Dorothy Claire and The Modernaires. Written by Milton Leeds and Alberto Dominguez, Victor released two performances, one the Bluebird studio recording from February 19, 1941 and the other from June 3, 1941 at the Pacific Square Ballroom in San Diego, California, with Paula Kelly replacing Dorothy Claire.
1941	"Boulder Buff"	19	2	
1941	"The Booglie Wooglie Piggy"	7	5	
1941	"Adios"	17	4	Instrumental.
1941	"You And I"	4	6	
1941	"The Cowboy Serenade"	17	2	
1941	"Chattanooga Choo Choo"	1	23	Vocal by Tex Beneke, Paula Kelly and the Modernaires. Number one for nine weeks. Recorded for the soundtrack of Sun Valley Serenade and then recorded on May 7, 1941 for Victor Bluebird in Hollywood, California. The song also acts as a 39 second teaser in 1942's Orchestra Wives. Released as V-Disc 281A in October 1944 with Sgt. Ray McKinley and the Crew Chiefs on vocals with Glenn Miller and the AAFTC Orchestra.
1941	"Elmer's Tune"	1	15	Vocal by Ray Eberle and the Modernaires, music written by Elmer Albrecht. Number one for 1 week.
1941	"It Happened In Sun Valley"	20	1	Vocal in Sun Valley Serenade by The Modernaires, and Six Hits and a Miss. Also recorded separately by the band for Bluebird in New York City on August 11, 1941 and released as a Bluebird B-11263-A. The single reached number 18 on the Billboard chart in 1941, staying on for one week.
1941	"I Know Why"	19	1	Vocal by Paula Kelly and the Modernaires. The B-side to "Chattanooga Choo Choo", recorded May 7, 1941, also was featured in Sun Valley Serenade. Sung by Pat Friday and John Payne with the Modernaires in Sun Valley Serenade.
1941	"I'm Thrilled"	20	1	
1941	"Jingle Bells"	5	2	Vocal by Tex Beneke, Ernie Caceres and the Modernaires.
1942	"(There'll Be Bluebirds Over) The White Cliffs of Dover"	6	7	
1942	"A String Of Pearls"	1	18	Instrumental. Number one for two weeks. Music written by Jerry Gray, lyrics by Eddie DeLange.
1942	"Ev'rything I Love"	7	4	Vocal by Ray Eberle and Choir.
1942	"This Is No Laughing Matter"	17	1	
1942	"Moonlight Cocktail"	1	10	Vocal by Ray Eberle and The Modernaires, Number one for 10 weeks, it was written by James Kimball "Kim" Gannon and Charles Luckey Roberts.
1942	"Don't Sit Under the Apple Tree (With Anyone Else But Me)"	2	13	Vocal by Marion Hutton, Tex Beneke and The Modernaires. Number two for 2 weeks.
1942	"Skylark"	7	11	
1942	"The Story Of A Starry Night"	19	1	
1942	"Always In My Heart"	10	1	
1942	"American Patrol"	19	1	Instrumental, composed in 1885 by F.W. Meacham. First Glenn Miller hit after his Orchestra was upgraded to full-price Victor label.
1942	"(I've Got a Gal In) Kalamazoo"	1	18	Vocal by Tex Beneke, Marion Hutton and the Modernaires. Number one for 7 weeks. The biggest hit from Orchestra Wives, it was recorded at RCA Victor's studios in Hollywood, pressed as Victor 27934-A, and was number one for 7 weeks on the Billboard Best Sellers chart in 1942.
1942	"Sweet Eloise"	14	8	Vocal by Ray Eberle and the Modernaires. Recorded April 2, 1942. Written by Mack David, bandleader Russ Morgan, and arranged by Jerry Gray.
1942	"Serenade in Blue"	2	15	Vocal by Ray Eberle and the Modernaires. Number two for 1 week. Featured in Orchestra Wives with Pat Friday ghost singing.
1942	"At Last"	14	8	Envisioned as a major song for Sun Valley Serenade with an arrangement by Jerry Gray and Bill Finegan, "At Last" was sung off-screen by Pat Friday with actor John Payne. However, the song was mostly deleted from the release print; The audio portion survives and has been issued many times. Reintroduced in an alternative arrangement the next year, with dual vocals by Ray Eberle and Pat Friday, its musical motif was played throughout the movie during dramatic and romantic scenes. Eberle sang it solo for the Victor 78. Glenn Miller was the first to record "At Last", reaching fourteen on the Billboard in 1942 and his recording became the first in a long history of popular versions. "At Last" subsequently became a standard covered by Nat King Cole and Etta James in the 1950s and 1960s, the Etta James version reaching number 47 on the Billboard Hot 100 and number two on the R&B chart in 1961, Ray Anthony, who reached number two on Billboard with a remake in 1952, Lou Rawls, Celine Dion, Diana Krall, Eva Cassidy, Miles Davis, Joni Mitchell, Bing Crosby, Aretha Franklin, the Oak Ridge Boys, Cyndi Lauper, Doris Day, Ella Fitzgerald, Chet Baker, Michael Bolton, Dianne Reeves, Stevie Wonder, Christina Aguilera, and Beyoncé in 2008. By the 2000s, Etta James' version seemed to have eclipsed Miller's. Miller's version, however, appeared in Till There Was You (1997). Beyoncé also sang it at one of the Inaugural Balls for President Barack Obama in 2009.
1942	"Juke Box Saturday Night"	7	8	
1942	"Moonlight Becomes You"	5	8	Vocal by Skip Nelson and the Modernaires.
1942	"Dearly Beloved"	5	4	Vocal by Skip Nelson.
1943	"Moonlight Mood"	16	2	Vocal by Skip Nelson and the Modernaires.
1943	"That Old Black Magic"	1	14	Vocal by Skip Nelson and the Modernaires, number one for 1 week. Written by Johnny Mercer and Harold Arlen, it was the last Glenn Miller number one hit.
1943	"Rhapsody In Blue"	15	6	
1943	"Blue Rain" (re-issue)	9	3	Reissue B-side "Caribbean Clipper" written by arranger Jerry Gray.
1944	"It Must Be Jelly ('Cause Jam Don't Shake Like That)"	12	8	
1944	"Sunrise Serenade" (re-issue)	18	1	
1944	"A String of Pearls" (re-issue)	18	1	
1944	"Here We Go Again"	20	1	
1948	"Adios" (re-issue)	20	1	

=== Other discographical highlights, radio format ===
- "Sold American" – written by Glenn Miller and Chummy MacGregor, was first recorded on May 23, 1938, as part of the first session for the new, reformed Glenn Miller Orchestra on Brunswick. When Miller signed with Victor he recorded "Sold American" again on June 27, 1939.
- "The Rhumba Jumps!" – Vocal by Marion Hutton and Tex Beneke.
- "Sometime" – vocal by Ray Eberle, composed by Glenn Miller and Chummy MacGregor in 1939, the song was only performed for radio broadcast; published in 1940 with lyrics credited to Mitchell Parish
- "Long Tall Mama" – written by Billy May under his first wife's name, "Arletta May".
- "Measure for Measure" – written by Billy May, recording exists from Sun Valley Serenade sound-on-film sessions.
- "Daisy Mae" – written by Billy May with Hal McIntyre
- "Gabby Goose" – written by Billy May
- "Swinging at the Seance" - composed by Edward Stone, whose real name was Abie Steinfeld. The song was covered by The Moon-Rays in 2008, and the Deep River Boys in 2009.
- "Yesterthoughts" – vocal by Ray Eberle.
- "Flagwaver" - written by Jerry Gray.
- "A Love Song Hasn't Been Sung" - written by Jerry Gray, Bill Conway, and Harold Dickinson.
- "Are You Rusty, Gate?" – written by Jerry Gray.
- "Introduction to a Waltz" – instrumental composed by Glenn Miller, Jerry Gray, and Hal Dickinson and performed for radio broadcast only.
- "The Man in the Moon" – Vocal by Ray Eberle. Written by Jerry Gray, Jerry Lawrence, and John Benson Brooks and recorded on September 3, 1941.
- "Solid as a Stonewall, Jackson" – written by Chummy MacGregor and Jerry Gray
- "Stardust" by Hoagy Carmicheal and Mitchell Parish. Recorded January 29, 1940 for Bluebird.
- "Delilah" – Vocal by Tex Beneke and the Modernaires.
- "Sentimental Me" – Vocal by Dorothy Claire.
- "Ida! Sweet As Apple Cider" – Vocal by Tex Beneke; Recorded January 17, 1941. Written by Eddie Leonard. Two recordings exist, one a test pressing. Arranged by Billy May.
- "Down for the Count" - written by Bill Finegan, performed over broadcast.
- "Conversation Piece" - written by Bill Finegan, performed over broadcast.
- "Tiger Rag" – composed by Nick LaRocca.
- "Slumber Song" – written by Chummy MacGregor and Saul Tepper. It was used as Glenn Miller's theme song in 1941 when contractual problems with ASCAP forbade him from using "Moonlight Serenade".
- "The Spirit is Willing" – written by Jerry Gray. Recorded for the soundtrack, but not used for Sun Valley Serenade. Audio still survives and has been reissued several times. Issued on 78 as Bluebird B-11135-A.
- "Helpless" – written by Glenn Miller Orchestra; guitarist and vocalist Jack Lathrop
- "Long Time No See, Baby" – Vocal by Marion Hutton – Jack Lathrop & Sunny Skylar (w&m)
- "Keep 'Em Flying" – written by Jerry Gray. Glenn Miller changed the song title from "That's Where I Came In" to "Keep 'Em Flying". Recorded December 8, 1941.
- "Oh! So Good" – written by Jerry Gray
- "Soldier, Let Me Read Your Letter" – arranged by arranger/trumpeter Billy May; written by Sidney Lippman, Pvt. Pat Fallon and Pvt. Tim Pasma
- "I Got Rhythm" – Billy May, arranger; January 1, 1942 broadcast
- "Boom Shot" – composed by Glenn Miller and Billy May (under his wife's name Arletta May) for Orchestra Wives and arranged by George Williams.
- "Blues in the Night" — December 18, 1941 broadcast.
- "When Johnny Comes Marching Home" — Recorded February 18, 1942.
- "Rainbow Rhapsody" — Recorded July 16, 1942.
- "Make Believe" — September 9, 1942 broadcast.
- "Lullaby of the Rain" — Recorded May 20, 1942.

Harry Warren and Mack Gordon songs for Sun Valley Serenade and Orchestra Wives: Harry Warren and Mack Gordon were songwriters under contract with Twentieth Century Fox from 1940 to 1943. During that time period they composed the songs for Miller's movies for Fox.

- "The Kiss Polka", used in Sun Valley Serenade and also appeared as a Bluebird 78.
- "The World is Waiting to Waltz Again" – vocal by John Payne, cut out of the release print of Sun Valley Serenade.
- "People Like You and Me" – Vocals by Marion Hutton, Tex Beneke, Ray Eberle, and the Modernaires in Orchestra Wives. Not recorded commercially or performed for broadcast.
- "That's Sabotage" – vocal by Marion Hutton. Cut out of the release print of Orchestra Wives supposedly by pressure from the United States government about how the war effort was being presented in the song. The 35mm audio survives and has been released many times. Also recorded with Marion Hutton for RCA Victor.

Radio format:
In sharing air time with the Andrews Sisters for the early Chesterfield Shows, the Miller band had nine minutes to present its music. Miller instituted medleys of Something Old, Something New, Something Borrowed, Something Blue into the band's broadcasts to enable it to play as much as possible. This medley tradition continued into both later programs and the I Sustain The Wings radio broadcasts of the Major Glenn Miller Army Air Forces Orchestra (March 20, 1943 to January 15, 1946).

Sample Glenn Miller medley, June 19, 1940, Cincinnati, Ohio, Chesterfield show with a Jerry Gray arrangement of all tracks:

Old – "The Touch of Your Hand" (Generally an older song)

New – "Basket Weaver Man" (A way to introduce a new song, written by Joe McCarthy and Walter Donaldson)

Borrowed – "The Waltz You Saved For Me" (Themes or songs made famous by other bands/bandleaders; Borrowed from bandleader Wayne King, written by King, Gus Kahn and Emil Flindt)

Blue – "Blue Danube" ("Blue" in title, written by Johann Strauss Jr., 1867)

== Recordings as sideman, arranger, and leader: 1926–1938 ==
The first authenticated recordings made by Glenn Miller were in 1926. In the fall of 1926, Earl Baker, a cornetist, made recordings on cylinders using the Edison Standard Phonograph recording device, making the first recordings of Glenn Miller, Benny Goodman, and Fud Livingston. Miller and Goodman were both in the Ben Pollack and his Californians band at that time. The Ben Pollack band was in Chicago, Illinois, to make studio recordings for Victor. The Baker cylinders are available on the album "The Legendary Earl Baker Cylinders", released by the Jazz Archives record label as JA43 in 1979. The songs performed included "Sleepy Time Gal", "Sister Kate", "After I Say I'm Sorry", and "Sobbin' Blues".

- "When I First Met Mary" – recorded on December 9, 1926, in Chicago as part of Ben Pollack and his Californians which featured Benny Goodman on clarinet. The recording was released as Victor 20394.
- "He's the Last Word" – recorded on December 12, 1926, with Ben Pollack and featuring a solo by Benny Goodman
- "Room 1411 (Goin' to Town)" – Miller's first known composition, written with Benny Goodman in 1928 and recorded with Miller's peers was released on 78 as Brunswick 4013.
- "Solo Hop" – composed by Glenn Miller in 1935 when he began recording under his own name which features a trumpet solo by Bunny Berigan. The record reached number seven on the Billboard singles chart in 1935 becoming Miller's first hit record.
- "Dese Dem Dose" – with the Dorsey Brothers and Ray Noble.
- "When Icky Morgan Plays the Organ" – recorded with the Clark Randall Orchestra in 1935. Clark Randall was the pseudonym of Frank Tennille, the father of Toni Tennille of the Captain and Tennille. Most of the band members in the Clark Randall Orchestra were part of the Bob Crosby Orchestra.
- "Annie's Cousin Fanny" – with the Dorsey Brothers in 1934, vocal by Kay Weber and orchestra. This song was covered by Dick Pierce, Russ Carlton and his Orchestra, Marshall Royal and Maxwell Davis on the album Studio Cuts which includes two takes of the song and in 2000 by Mora's Modern Rhythmists Dance Orchestra, a ten-piece ensemble that plays jazz and swing from the 1920s and 1930s. The record was banned by radio stations in 1934 because of suggestive lyrics relying on double entendre.
- "Every Day's a Holiday" was a 1938 Brunswick 78 single by Glenn Miller and his Orchestra that reached number 17 on Billboard, staying on the charts for one week. This was Glenn Miller's second hit record before he switched to the Bluebird label.
- "Doin' the Jive"
- "Community Swing"

=== Pre-1938 charted recordings ===
Year	Single	Group	Role			Peak chart position	Total weeks charted
Year	Single	Group	Sideman	Arranger	Leader	US	Total weeks charted
1928	"Sweet Sue – Just You"	Ben Pollack and His Californians	Yes			3	7
1929	"Sally Of My Dreams"	Dorsey Brothers' Orchestra	Yes	Yes		17	2
1929	"Let's Do It (Let's Fall In Love)"	Bing Crosby (with Dorsey Brothers' Orchestra)	Yes	Yes		9	4
1929	"Yellow Dog Blues"	Ben's Bad Boys	Yes			20	1
1929	"Indiana"	Red Nichols and His Five Pennies	Yes			19	1
1930	"Strike Up the Band"	Red Nichols and His "Strike Up The Band" Orchestra	Yes			7	7
1930	"I Want to Be Happy"	Red Nichols and His Five Pennies	Yes	Yes		19	1
1930	"China Boy"	Red Nichols and His Five Pennies	Yes	Yes		18	1
1930	"Embraceable You"	Red Nichols and His Five Pennies	Yes			3	9
1930	"It Had to Be You"	Red Nichols and His Five Pennies	Yes			19	1
1930	"I Got Rhythm"	Red Nichols and His Five Pennies	Yes			5	8
1930	"Fine and Dandy"	The Travelers	Yes	Yes		18	1
1931	"He's Not Worth Your Tears"	Benny Goodman and His Orchestra	Yes			20	1
1931	"Blue Again"	Red Nichols and His Five Pennies	Yes			10	6
1931	"Walkin' My Baby Back Home"	The Charleston Chasers	Yes			15	4
1931	"Corrine Corrina"	Red Nichols and His Five Pennies	Yes			18	1
1931	"Basin Street Blues"	The Charleston Chasers	Yes	Yes		14	5
1931	"Say A Little Prayer For Me"	Smith Ballew and His Orchestra	Yes	Yes		15	2
1931	"You Rascal You"	Red Nichols and His Five Pennies	Yes			17	1
1931	"Little Girl"	Joe Venuti and His Orchestra	Yes			4	6
1931	"Fan It"	Red Nichols and His Five Pennies	Yes			20	1
1931	"What Is It?"	Smith Ballew and His Orchestra	Yes	Yes		17	2
1931	"Time on My Hands (You In My Arms)"	Smith Ballew and His Orchestra	Yes	Yes		6	6
1931	"You Call It Madness (But I Call It Love)"	Smith Ballew and His Orchestra	Yes	Yes		12	4
1931	"Ooh That Kiss"	Dorsey Brothers' Orchestra	Yes	Yes		18	1
1932	"Was That the Human Thing to Do?"	The Boswell Sisters ( w/ Dorsey Brothers' Orchestra)	Yes	Yes		7	4
1934	"You Oughta Be in Pictures (My Star Of Stars)"	The Boswell Sisters ( w/ Dorsey Brothers' Orchestra)	Yes	Yes		17	1
1934	"Lost In A Fog"	Dorsey Brothers' Orchestra	Yes	Yes		15	2
1934	"I'm Getting Sentimental Over You"	Dorsey Brothers' Orchestra	Yes	Yes		20	1
1934	"What A Diff'rence A Day Made"	Dorsey Brothers' Orchestra	Yes	Yes		5	7
1934	"You're The Top"	Dorsey Brothers' Orchestra	Yes	Yes		17	2
1934	"It's Dark On Observatory Hill"	Dorsey Brothers' Orchestra	Yes	Yes		16	3
1934	"If It's Love"	Dorsey Brothers' Orchestra	Yes	Yes		18	1
1935	"Clouds"	Ray Noble and His Orchestra	Yes	Yes		5	9
1935	"It's Bad For Me"	Ray Noble and His Orchestra	Yes	Yes		15	2
1935	"Flowers for Madame"	Ray Noble and His Orchestra	Yes	Yes		11	9
1935	"Lullaby of Broadway"	Dorsey Brothers' Orchestra		Yes		①	11
1935	"Paris in Spring"	Ray Noble and His Orchestra	Yes	Yes		①	11
1935	"Let's Swing It"	Ray Noble and His Orchestra	Yes	Yes		①	7
1935	"Solo Hop"	Glenn Miller and His Orchestra (Studio group)		Yes	Yes	7	5
1935	"Chinatown, My Chinatown"	Ray Noble and His Orchestra	Yes	Yes		14	2
1935	"Top Hat"	Ray Noble and His Orchestra	Yes	Yes		4	6
1935	"Double Trouble"	Ray Noble and His Orchestra	Yes	Yes		12	10
1935	"Mad About The Boy"	Ray Noble and His Orchestra	Yes	Yes		19	1
1935	"The Piccolino"	Ray Noble and His Orchestra	Yes	Yes		14	2
1935	"Where Am I (Am I In Heaven?)"	Ray Noble and His Orchestra	Yes	Yes		16	4
1936	"Dinner For One Please, James"	Ray Noble and His Orchestra	Yes	Yes		7	10
1936	"I Built A Dream One Day"	Ray Noble and His Orchestra	Yes	Yes		19	1
1936	"A Beautiful Lady In Blue"	Ray Noble and His Orchestra	Yes	Yes		13	3
1936	"It's Great To Be In Love"	Ray Noble and His Orchestra	Yes	Yes		20	1
1936	"The Touch of Your Lips"	Ray Noble and His Orchestra	Yes	Yes		12	4
1936	"When I'm With You"	Ray Noble and His Orchestra	Yes	Yes		15	4
1936	"But Definitely"	Ray Noble and His Orchestra	Yes	Yes		20	1
1936	"Thru' The Courtesy of Love"	Ben Pollack and His Orchestra	Yes			19	1
1936	"I've Got You Under My Skin"	Ray Noble and His Orchestra	Yes	Yes		3	13
1936	"Easy To Love"	Ray Noble and His Orchestra	Yes	Yes		7	9
1937	"I've Got My Love To Keep Me Warm"	Ray Noble and His Orchestra	Yes	Yes		3	9
1938	"Every Day's A Holiday"	Glenn Miller and His Orchestra (Brunswick Records predecessor band)			Yes	17	1

== Army Air Force Band (Glenn Miller Army Air Forces Orchestra) and V-Discs: 1943–1944 ==
Navy V-Discs featured different color schemes than standard V-Discs.

Year released	V-Disc type	No.	Songs	Group	Background					
Year released	V-Disc type	No.	Songs	Group	Background	1943	V-Disc	12	"At Last" / "Moonlight Mood"	Glenn Miller and His Orchestra
39	"Moonlight Serenade" / "My Melancholy Baby"					1943	V-Disc			Glenn Miller and His Orchestra
65	Spoken Introduction "Stardust" / "St. Louis Blues March"	Captain Glenn Miller and the Army Air Forces Training Command Orchestra	"Stardust": The civilian band's arrangement by Glenn Miller and Bill Finegan was recorded in 1940 for Bluebird. The Army Air Force band uses a completely different arrangement making use of its string section and includes a French horn solo. A version was released as V-Disc 65A in December, 1943 with a spoken message by Glenn Miller: "This is Captain Glenn Miller speaking for the Army Air Forces Training Command Orchestra and we hope that you soldiers of the Allied forces enjoy these V-Discs that we're making just for you." "St. Louis Blues March": Arranged by Jerry Gray, Ray McKinley, and Perry Burgett and recorded on October 29, 1943. Released as V-Disc 65B in December 1943 and as Navy V-Disc 114A. "St. Louis Blues March", credited as a "March" side, was released as V-Disc 522A in October, 1945.			1943	V-Disc			
1944	V-Disc	91	"Stormy Weather" / "Buckle Down, Winsocki", "El Capitan"	Captain Glenn Miller and the Army Air Forces Training Command Orchestra	"Stormy Weather": Released as V-Disc 91A in January 1944 as a "Sweet" side by Captain Glenn Miller and the AAFTC Orchestra. "El Capitan": Released as the flip side, by the 418th AAFTC Band Under the Direction of Captain Glenn Miller as a "March" side; composed by John Philip Sousa and originally recorded by his band in 1895.					
1944	V-Disc	123	"Going Home", "Honeysuckle Rose", I Sustain the Wings (uncredited)→ "My Blue Heaven" / "In the Mood"	Captain Glenn Miller and the Army Air Forces Training Command Orchestra / Glenn Miller and His Orchestra	"Going Home": Written by Antonín Dvořák, arranged by Harry Katzman, and broadcast on June 2, 1944 on the I Sustain the Wings radio program. "I Sustain the Wings": The 1943 NBC radio program theme was co-written by Glenn Miller and was used to introduce some V-Discs. Released as V-Disc 123A in February 1944 as an "Orchestral" side by Capt. Glenn Miller and the AAFTC Orchestra.					
1944	V-Disc	144	"The Squadron Song", "Tail End Charlie" / "Don't Be That Way", "Blue Champagne"	Captain Glenn Miller and the Army Air Forces Training Command Orchestra	"Tail End Charlie": Written by Bill Finegan. Released as V-Disc 144A in March 1944 as a "Swing" side by Captain Glenn Miller and the AAFTC Orchestra.					
1944	V-Disc	183	"Embraceable You", "G.I. Jive" / "Sophisticated Lady", "Azure"	Captain Glenn Miller and the Army Air Forces Training Command Orchestra / Duke Ellington and His Orchestra	Glenn Miller tracks recorded 21 January 1944. V-Disc released May, 1944.					
1944	V-Disc	201	"Moon Dreams" / "Sleepy Town Train"	Captain Glenn Miller and the Army Air Forces Training Command Orchestra / Glenn Miller and His Orchestra	"Moon Dreams": Vocal by Johnny Desmond and the Crew Chiefs, was recorded with the Glenn Miller AAF Band and released as V-Disc 201A in October, 1944 and Navy V-Disc 114B. The music was written by Chummy MacGregor and lyrics by Johnny Mercer. Gil Evans was also a main arranger for the Claude Thornhill orchestra in the forties, which was financed by Miller. As such, Glenn Miller had a very slight relationship with modern jazz, tangential nonetheless. Incidentally, Miles Davis did not like Thornhill's interpretations of some bebop songs that Evans arranged, like "Donna Lee", calling them "mannered". Despite this, Evans and Davis were best friends and collaborators for the rest of their lives. The Miles Davis Nonet recorded a live performance of "Moon Dreams" in 1948 in New York. Martha Tilton also recorded a version in 1942. Jazz historian Richard Jessen has also proposed that Miller's recording of "Wham" from August 1, 1939, predates the same phrasing used in famed bebop track "Salt Peanuts" by Charlie Parker and Dizzy Gillespie in 1944. "Sleepy Town Train": 1942 RCA Bluebird studio recording, "Sweet" side.					
1944	V-Disc	223	"Everybody Loves My Baby (But My Baby Don't Love Me)", "Stompin' at the Savoy" / "Stealin' Apples"	Captain Glenn Miller and the Army Air Forces Training Command Orchestra	Glenn Miller tracks recorded 21 January and 20 May 1944. V-Disc released July, 1944.					
1944	Navy V-Disc	3	"Everybody Loves My Baby (But My Baby Don't Love Me)", "Stompin' at the Savoy" / "Stealin' Apples"	Captain Glenn Miller and the Army Air Forces Training Command Orchestra	Glenn Miller tracks recorded 21 January and 20 May 1944. V-Disc released July, 1944.					
1944	V-Disc	242	"A Fellow On A Furlough", "Guns In The Sky" / "Poinciana"	Captain Glenn Miller and the Army Air Forces Training Command Orchestra	Recorded 20 May 1944. V-Disc released August, 1944.					
1944	Navy V-Disc	22	"A Fellow On A Furlough", "Guns In The Sky" / "Poinciana"	Captain Glenn Miller and the Army Air Forces Training Command Orchestra	Recorded 20 May 1944. V-Disc released August, 1944.					
1944	V-Disc	281	"Chattanooga Choo Choo", "Sun Valley Jump" / "It Had to Be You", "Special Delivery Stomp"	Captain Glenn Miller and the Army Air Forces Training Command Orchestra / Artie Shaw and His Gramercy Five	Glenn Miller tracks recorded 3 June 1944. V-Disc released October, 1944.					
1944	Navy V-Disc	61	"Chattanooga Choo Choo", "Sun Valley Jump" / "It Had to Be You", "Special Delivery Stomp"	Captain Glenn Miller and the Army Air Forces Training Command Orchestra / Artie Shaw and His Gramercy Five	Glenn Miller tracks recorded 3 June 1944. V-Disc released October, 1944.					
1944	V-Disc	302	"These Foolish Things Remind Me of You", "Hallelujah" / "In the Gloaming", "Deep Purple"	Benny Goodman and His V-Disc All-Star Band // and His V-Disc Quartette / Major Glenn Miller and the Army Air Forces Training Command Orchestra	Glenn Miller tracks recorded 20 May 1944. V-Disc released November, 1944.					
1944	Navy V-Disc	82	"These Foolish Things Remind Me of You", "Hallelujah" / "In the Gloaming", "Deep Purple"	Benny Goodman and His V-Disc All-Star Band // and His V-Disc Quartette / Major Glenn Miller and the Army Air Forces Training Command Orchestra	Glenn Miller tracks recorded 20 May 1944. V-Disc released November, 1944.					
1944	V-Disc	334	"My Buddy", "Farewell Blues" / "Theme", "Lover"	Major Glenn Miller and the Army Air Forces Training Command Orchestra / David Rose and His Orchestra	Glenn Miller tracks recorded 10 June 1944. "Farewell Blues": written by Elmer Schoebel, Paul Mares, and Leon Roppolo of The New Orleans Rhythm Kings in 1922. Released as Bluebird 10495-B in 1939 and V-Disc 334A issued December, 1944.					
1945	V-Disc	352	"(All of a Sudden) My Heart Sings", "Singin' in the Rain" / "Missouri Waltz", "Alice Blue Gown"	Guy Lombardo and His Orchestra / Glenn Miller and His Orchestra	Glenn Miller tracks recorded by civilian band in 1940 for Victor Bluebird. V-Disc released January, 1945.					
1945	V-Disc	381	"I've Got A Heart Filled With Love For You Dear" / "Sleigh Ride in July", "I Can't Tell Why I Love You But I Do"	Major Glenn Miller and the Army Air Forces Training Command Orchestra / Dinah Shore	Glenn Miller tracks recorded 13 May 1944. V-Disc released March, 1945.					
1945	V-Disc	421	"Holiday for Strings" / "Sleepy Lagoon", "Hora Staccato"	Major Glenn Miller and the Army Air Forces Training Command Orchestra / Paul Baron and His Orchestra	Glenn Miller tracks recorded 3 June 1944. V-Disc released July, 1945.					
1945	V-Disc	466	"Bye Bye Blues", "Wang Wang Blues" / "Too Marvelous for Words"	Major Glenn Miller and the Army Air Forces Training Command Orchestra / Harry James and His Orchestra	Glenn Miller tracks recorded 13 May and 3 June 1944. V-Disc released July, 1945.					
1945	Navy V-Disc	246	"Bye Bye Blues", "Wang Wang Blues" / "Too Marvelous for Words"	Major Glenn Miller and the Army Air Forces Training Command Orchestra / Harry James and His Orchestra	Glenn Miller tracks recorded 13 May and 3 June 1944. V-Disc released July, 1945.					
1945	V-Disc	482	"I Can't Give You Anything But Love Baby", "Little Brown Jug" / "I Can't Get Started", "Keep the Home Fires Burning"	Major Glenn Miller and the Army Air Forces Training Command Orchestra / Charlie Barnet and His Orchestra	Glenn Miller tracks recorded 13 and 27 May 1944. V-Disc released August, 1945.					
1945	V-Disc	504	"The Army Air Corps Song", "I Hear You Screaming" / "A Kiss Goodnight", "Northwest Passage"	Major Glenn Miller and the Army Air Forces Training Command Orchestra / Woody Herman and His Orchestra	Glenn Miller tracks recorded 13 May and 3 June 1944. V-Disc released September, 1945.					
1945	Navy V-Disc	264	"The Army Air Corps Song", "I Hear You Screaming" / "A Kiss Goodnight", "Northwest Passage"	Major Glenn Miller and the Army Air Forces Training Command Orchestra / Woody Herman and His Orchestra	Glenn Miller tracks recorded 13 May and 3 June 1944. V-Disc released September, 1945.					
1945	V-Disc	522	"St. Louis Blues" / "Dinah"	Captain Glenn Miller and the Army Air Forces Training Command Orchestra / Sam Donahue And The Navy Dance Band	"St. Louis Blues March" recorded 29 October 1943. Reissue of B-side of V-Disc 65, 522 was released October, 1945.					
1945	V-Disc	533	"Songs My Mother Taught Me" / "Peggy, The Pin Up Girl", "My Melancholy Baby"	Major Glenn Miller and the Army Air Forces Training Command Orchestra / Sam Donahue And The Navy Dance Band	Glenn Miller tracks recorded 29 April and 6 May 1944. V-Disc released November, 1945.					
1946	V-Disc	587	"Why Dream", "Passage Interdit" / "Beale Street Blues"	Major Glenn Miller's Army Air Forces Overseas Orchestra / Jack Teagarden and His Orchestra	Glenn Miller tracks recorded 27 October and 10 November 1945. V-Disc released February, 1946.					
1946	V-Disc	601	"Symphony"/ "I Got Rhythm"	Major Glenn Miller's AAF Overseas Orchestra / The Benny Goodman Sextet	Glenn Miller track recorded 27 October 1945. V-Disc released March, 1946.					
1948	V-Disc	842	"Indian Love Call", "Ramblin' Rose" / "In the Mood", "University Of Minnesota March"	Tony Pastor with All-Star Band / Glenn Miller and Overseas Band, Bert Hirsch and V-Disc Band	Glenn Miller track recorded 17 November 1945. V-Disc released May, 1948.					

=== Unreleased V-Discs and addendum ===
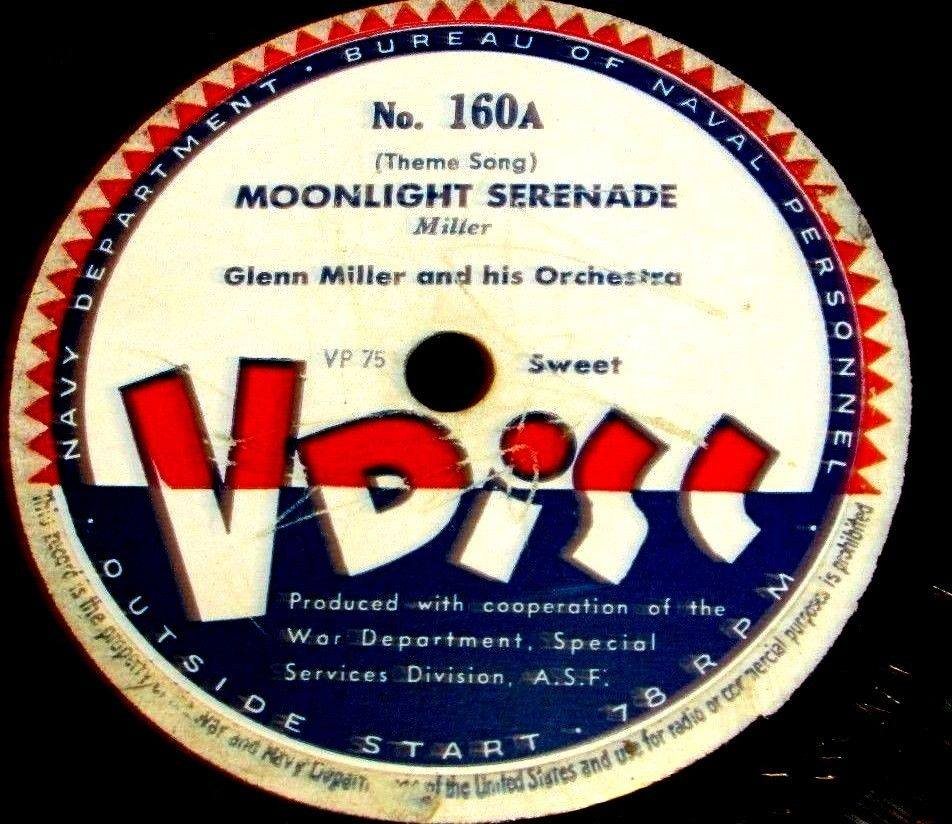
A U.S. Navy V-Disc.

Other popular tracks, not recorded for or unreleased as V-Discs were:

- "7-0-5" or "Seven-O-Five" – written by Glenn Miller. While recorded for V-Disc, it went unreleased.
- "Passage Interdit" - written by Jerry Gray. Released as V-Disc 587A in February, 1946.
- "Snafu Jump" – written by Jerry Gray
- "Long Ago (And Far Away)" vocal Johnny Desmond / Norman Leyden, arranger March 25, 1944, broadcast
- "People Will Say We're In Love" vocal Johnny Desmond / Norman Leyden, arranger
- "Flying Home", written by Benny Goodman, Eddie DeLange, and Lionel Hampton; arranged by Steve Steck; April 8, 1944, broadcast
- "Mission to Moscow" - Mel Powell, composer and arranger

Songs that were in the civilian band and Army Air Force band libraries include:

- "Jeep Jockey Jump" – written by Jerry Gray and one broadcast of the song was done by the civilian band.
- "It Must Be Jelly ('Cause Jam Don't Shake Like That)" – music written by Chummy MacGregor and George Williams and lyrics by Sunny Skylar. George Williams, arranger /Mar. 11, 1944 Chant by the band. This version is from the Army Air Force band. The civilian band played the same arrangement that was performed at least twice, available on a Victor 78 recording, Vi-20-1546-A, recorded July 15, 1942 or also taken from a radio remote broadcast from September 15, 1942, in Boston, Massachusetts and later re-released by RCA Victor on LPT 6700. According to the tsort.com website, the 78 single, Victor 20–1546, reached number twelve on the Billboard charts in January, 1944, where it stayed for eight weeks on the chart. Moreover, the record was a crossover hit, reaching number two on the Billboard 'Harlem' Hit Parade Chart on February 19, 1944, the then equivalent of the later R&B chart, and number sixteen on the Billboard Juke Box Chart. Harry James, Johnny Long, and Frankie Ford also recorded versions. Woody Herman recorded a version that was also released as a V-Disc, No. 320B, in November, 1944.
- "Sun Valley Jump" – written by Jerry Gray. Released as a V-Disc, No. 281A, in October 1944 by Glenn Miller and the AAFTC Orchestra.
- "Rhapsody in Blue" – written by George Gershwin. The civilian band version has Bobby Hackett solo in the middle. "Rhapsody in Blue" from the civilian band is not the entire work, but rather a section of the work arranged to fit on a 10" 78 rpm record. It was released as Victor 20-1529-A.
- "Blue Rain" – written by Johnny Mercer and Jimmy Van Heusen, Civilian band-arrangement with Ray Eberle vocal, unknown arranger. Army Air Force band: arrangement with strings, no vocal.
- "Are You Jumpin' Jack?" – written by Bill Finegan. First civilian band version, December 21, 1940, for a remote broadcast on NBC.
- " Enlisted Men's Mess" – written by Jerry Gray. In the civilian band's library but not performed or recorded. Performed by the Army Air Forces Training Command Band and broadcast on the I Sustain the Wings radio program, May 5, 1944.

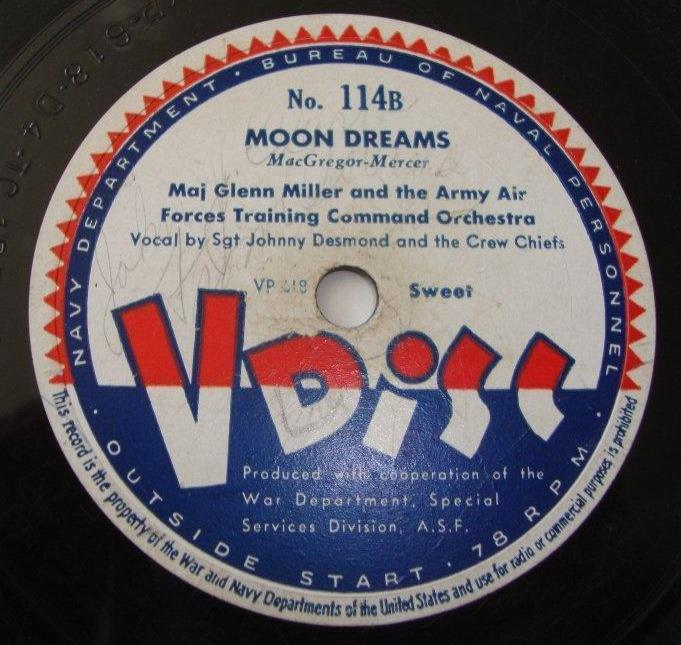
U.S. Navy V Disc No. 114B.

Songs that were prepared for but went unreleased on V-Disc include:

- "Stardust" (breakdown)
- "(The End Of A) Perfect Day"
- "Blue Room"
- "Holiday for Strings", in two parts
- "Here We Go Again"
- "In An Eighteenth Century Drawing Room"
- "The Old Refrain"
- "Song Of The Volga Boatmen"
- "Moonlight Serenade" (AAF arrangement)

A disc released in 2010 is called "The Final - His Last Recordings" and collects Miller's last known recorded performances (November, 1944) plus bonus spoken bits for the radio program "Music for the Wehrmacht", starring Major Miller with German speaker Ilse Weinberger. The album also contains a September 1944 interview and - as final track - the BBC radio announcement of Miller's disappearance.

== Album discography, 1928–1944 ==
Year	Album	Original release format(s)	Peak chart position	Total weeks charted	Sales certifications		
1943	Red Nichols Jazz Classics, Vol. One (Five Pennies compilation)	78 rpm shellac	–	–	–		
1943	Chicago Jazz Classics (Benny Goodman's Boys compilation)	78 rpm shellac	–	–	–		
1944	Up Swing	78 rpm shellac	4	3	–		
1945	Glenn Miller and His Orchestra	78 rpm shellac	①^{16}	130	RIAA: Gold		
1947	Glenn Miller Masterpieces, Volume II	78 rpm shellac	①^{6}	32	–		
1949	Starlight Serenades	78 rpm shellac	5	10	–		
1951	Glenn Miller Concert, Vol. One	33⅓ rpm vinyl 45 rpm vinyl	2	27	–		
1951	Glenn Miller Concert, Vol. Two	33⅓ rpm vinyl 45 rpm vinyl	6	8	–		
1951	Glenn Miller Concert, Vol. Three	33⅓ rpm vinyl 45 rpm vinyl	–	–	–		
1951	This Is Glenn Miller and His Orchestra	33⅓ rpm vinyl 45 rpm vinyl	–	–	–		
1951	This Is Glenn Miller and His Orchestra, Vol. Two	33⅓ rpm vinyl 45 rpm vinyl	–	–	–		
1953	Limited Edition	33⅓ rpm vinyl 45 rpm vinyl	3	3	–		
1953	Glenn Miller Plays Selections From the Film "The Glenn Miller Story"	33⅓ rpm vinyl 45 rpm vinyl	①^{11}	78	RIAA: Gold		
1954	Juke Box Saturday Night	33⅓ rpm vinyl 45 rpm vinyl	–	–	–		
1954	Sun Valley Serenade	33⅓ rpm vinyl 45 rpm vinyl	–	–	–		
1954	Orchestra Wives	33⅓ rpm vinyl 45 rpm vinyl	–	–	–		
1954	Limited Edition, Vol. Two	33⅓ rpm vinyl 45 rpm vinyl	4	16	–		
1954	Sunrise Serenade	33⅓ rpm vinyl 45 rpm vinyl	–	–	–		
1955	Glenn Miller Army Air Force Band	33⅓ rpm vinyl 45 rpm vinyl	–	–	–		
1956	Second Pressing (Repressing of Limited Edition)	33⅓ rpm vinyl 45 rpm vinyl	–	–	–		
1956	The Sound of Glenn Miller	33⅓ rpm vinyl 45 rpm vinyl	–	–	–		
1956	This Is Glenn Miller and His Orchestra (Expanded version of 1951 LP)	33⅓ rpm vinyl 45 rpm vinyl	–	–	–		
1956	Glenn Miller Plays Selections From the Film "The Glenn Miller Story" And Other Hits (Expanded version of 1954 LP)	33⅓ rpm vinyl 45 rpm vinyl	–	–	–		
1956	Glenn Miller Concert (Combination of Volume One and Three of earlier "Concert" series)	33⅓ rpm vinyl	–	–	–		
1957	Marvelous Miller Moods (Glenn Miller and the Army Air Force Band)	33⅓ rpm vinyl	16	6	–		
1958	Marvelous Miller Medleys	33⅓ rpm vinyl	–	–	–		
1958	The Glenn Miller Carnegie Hall Concert	33⅓ rpm vinyl	19	3	–		
1958	Original Film Soundtracks	33⅓ rpm vinyl	–	–	–		
1959	For the Very First Time	33⅓ rpm vinyl	–	–	–		
1960	Yesterday – The Authentic Sound of Glenn Miller	33⅓ rpm vinyl	–	–	–		
1963	On the Air – Volume One	33⅓ rpm vinyl compact cassette	–	–	–		
1963	On the Air – Volume Two	33⅓ rpm vinyl compact cassette	–	–	–		
1963	On the Air – Volume Three	33⅓ rpm vinyl compact cassette	–	–	–		
1963	The Great Glenn Miller and His Orchestra	33⅓ rpm vinyl compact cassette 8-track cartridge	–	–	–		
1964	The Original Recordings By Glenn Miller and His Orchestra	33⅓ rpm vinyl compact cassette 8-track cartridge	–	–	–		
1966	The Best of Glenn Miller, Volume Two	33⅓ rpm vinyl compact cassette 8-track cartridge	–	–	–		
1966	Blue Moonlight	33⅓ rpm vinyl compact cassette 8-track cartridge	–	–	–		
1967	The Nearness of You	33⅓ rpm vinyl compact cassette 8-track cartridge	–	–	–		
1967	The Chesterfield Broadcasts, Volume 1	33⅓ rpm vinyl compact cassette 8-track cartridge	–	–	–		
1968	The Chesterfield Broadcasts, Volume 2	33⅓ rpm vinyl compact cassette 8-track cartridge	–	–	–		
1968	The One and Only Glenn Miller	33⅓ rpm vinyl compact cassette 8-track cartridge	–	–	–		
1968	The Unforgettable Glenn Miller	33⅓ rpm vinyl compact cassette 8-track cartridge	–	–	RIAA: Platinum		
1969	The Best of Glenn Miller, Vol. III	33⅓ rpm vinyl compact cassette 8-track cartridge	–	–	–		
1970	A Memorial: 1944-1969	33⅓ rpm vinyl compact cassette 8-track cartridge	–	–	RIAA: Gold		
1972	Sunrise Serenade	33⅓ rpm vinyl compact cassette 8-track cartridge	–	–	–		
1972	The Original Big Band Hits, Vol. 1	33⅓ rpm vinyl compact cassette 8-track cartridge	–	–	–		
1972	The Original Big Band Hits, Vol. 2	33⅓ rpm vinyl compact cassette 8-track cartridge	–	–	–		
1973	String of Pearls	33⅓ rpm vinyl compact cassette 8-track cartridge	–	–	–		
1974	A Legendary Performer	33⅓ rpm vinyl compact cassette 8-track cartridge	115	9	–		
1974	Golden Hour of Glenn Miller	33⅓ rpm vinyl compact cassette 8-track cartridge	–	–	BPI: Silver		
1974	His Original Recordings of Greatest Hits	33⅓ rpm vinyl compact cassette 8-track cartridge	–	–	BVMI: Gold		
1975	Pure Gold	33⅓ rpm vinyl compact cassette 8-track cartridge	–	–	RIAA: Gold		
1975-80	The Complete Glenn Miller (LP releases)	33⅓ rpm vinyl compact cassette 8-track cartridge	–	–	–		
1976	Collection	33⅓ rpm vinyl compact cassette 8-track cartridge	–	–	BPI: Gold		
1977	The Unforgettable Glenn Miller	33⅓ rpm vinyl compact cassette 8-track cartridge	–	–	–		
1989	The Popular Recordings (1938-1942)	compact cassette compact disc	–	–	–		
1991	The Complete Glenn Miller (13x CD set)	compact cassette compact disc	–	–	–		
1993	The Ultimate Glenn Miller	compact cassette compact disc	–	–	–		
The Essential Glenn Miller	compact disc digital	compact cassette compact disc	–	–	–		
1996	Greatest Hits (RCA Victor imprint)	compact cassette compact disc	–	–	–		
1996	The Lost Recordings	–	–	–	–	–	BMG Music; BPI: Gold
1996	1996	Secret Broadcasts (RCA Victor)	–	–	–	compact disc	
1999	Candlelight Miller	compact disc	–	–	–		
1999	The Fabulous Glenn Miller	compact disc	–	–	–		
2003	Platinum Glenn Miller	compact disc digital	–	–	–		
2004	Centennial Collection	compact disc digital	–	–	–		
2005	The Essential Glenn Miller (Reissue)	compact disc digital					
2008	The Best of Glenn Miller 1938–1942 (RCA Original Masters series)	compact disc digital					

== Bibliography ==
- Polic, Edward F. (1990). The Glenn Miller Army Air Force Band. The Scarecrow Press, Inc.; Sustineo Alas/I Sustain the Wings edition (June 1, 1990) ISBN 0-8108-2269-5
- Firestone, Ross (1998). Swing, Swing, Swing: The Life and Times of Benny Goodman. W.W. Norton. ISBN 978-0-393-31168-6.
- Flower, John (1972). Moonlight Serenade: A Bio-discography of the Glenn Miller Civilian Band. Arlington House. ISBN 0-87000-161-2.
- Simon, George Thomas (1980). Glenn Miller and His Orchestra. New York: Da Capo paperback. ISBN 0-306-80129-9.
- Miller, Glenn (1943). Glenn Miller's Method for Orchestral Arranging. New York: Mutual Music Society. ASIN: B0007DMEDQ
- Miller, Glenn (1927). Glenn Miller's 125 Jazz Breaks For Trombone. Chicago: Melrose Brothers Music Company.
- Miller, Glenn (1939). Feist All-Star Series of Modern Rhythm Choruses Arranged By Glenn Miller For Trombone. New York: Leo J. Feist, Inc.
- Grudens, Richard (2004). Chattanooga Choo Choo: The Life and Times of the World Famous Glenn Miller Orchestra. Stony Brook, NY: Celebrity Profiles, 2004. ISBN 978-1-57579-277-4
- Sears, Richard S. (1980). V-Discs: A History and Discography. Greenwood Press; illustrated edition (December 23, 1980) ISBN 978-0-313-22207-8
