= Down for the Count (disambiguation) =

Down for the Count is an album by Y&T.

Down for the Count may also refer to:

- Down for the Count, a novel by Stuart M. Kaminsky
- Down for the Count (EP), an EP by Title Fight
- "Down for the Count", a 1956 song composed by Bill Finegan
  - Performed by Glenn Miller and His Orchestra
- "Down for the Count", a song by Bowling for Soup from their 2004 album A Hangover You Don't Deserve
