= Every Day's a Holiday =

Every Day's a Holiday may refer to:

- Every Day's a Holiday (1937 film), an American film starring Mae West
- Every Day's a Holiday (1965 film), a British film starring Liz Fraser
- "Every Day's a Holiday" (song), a 1938 single by Glenn Miller and his Orchestra
