= The Technical Training Command =

"The Technical Training Command" is a 1943 big band and jazz song performed and co-written by Glenn Miller. The instrumental version was a theme for I Sustain the Wings, the radio program broadcast on CBS and NBC from 1943 to 1945.

== Background ==
"The Technical Training Command" was a theme song written by Captain Glenn Miller, John Chummy MacGregor, and Private Sol Meyer for the Army Air Forces Training Command or AAFTC Orchestra and used at the close of early I Sustain the Wings radio programs in 1943. The theme was discontinued after six weeks. The recordings of each performance were recorded. The song also contained lyrics. The opening line is: "Who keeps the planes on high/ Blazing across the sky/ Who checks 'em when they land/ The Technical Training Command." The royalty was split three ways: 1/3 for each composer. Glenn Miller donated all of his royalty receipts to the Air Forces Aid and to the Red Cross. The sheet music for the song was contained in the 1943 songbook Glenn Miller's Dance Folio published by the Mutual Music Society in New York.

"I Sustain the Wings" was a radio program that was broadcast weekly on Saturday on NBC from September 18, 1943 to June 10, 1944 by the Army Air Force Band under the direction of Captain Glenn Miller. The radio show was initially on CBS from June to September, 1943. Glenn Miller was the host and conductor on the show, which also featured Ray McKinley, Jerry Gray, Johnny Desmond, and the Crew Chiefs, until June 10, 1944 when Harry Bluestone became the conductor. The Latin Sustineo Alas, "I Sustain the Wings", or "Keep 'Em Flying", was the motto of the U.S. Army Air Forces Technical Training Command. The I Sustain the Wings radio series continued until November 17, 1945.

The insignia of the USAAF Technical Training Command during World War II included a badge that featured the motto in Latin "Sustineo Alas", or "I Sustain the Wings". The badge was in use from July, 1942 until 1946. The badge was worn on the uniform tunic lapel or on the soft cap.
