= Jerry Jerome (saxophonist) =

American jazz saxophonist (1912–2001)

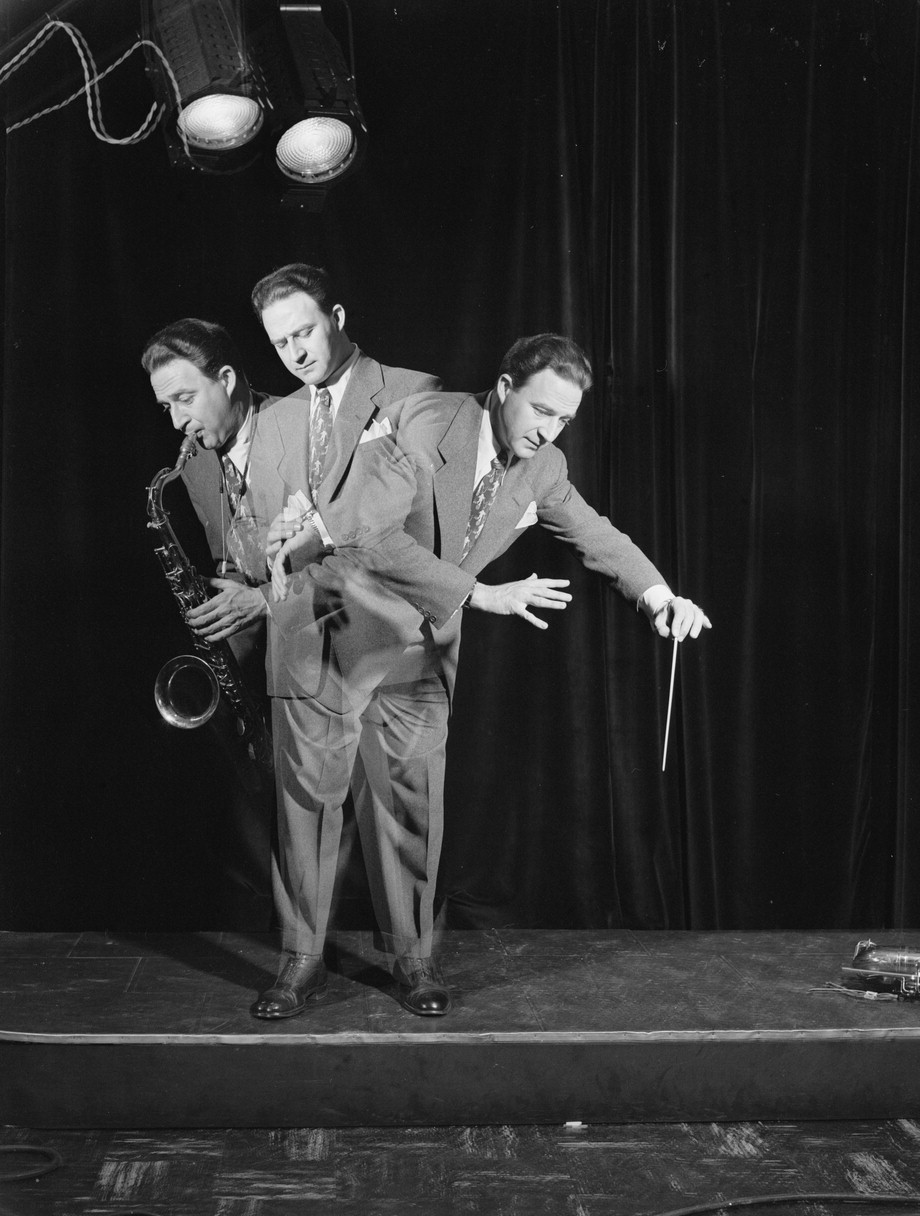

Background information
- Also known as: Buck Jerome
- Born: June 19, 1912; Brooklyn, New York, U.S.
- Died: November 17, 2001 (aged 89) Sarasota, Florida, U.S.
- Genre: Jazz
- Instruments: Tenor saxophone

Jerry "Buck" Jerome (June 19, 1912 – November 17, 2001) was an American jazz and big band musician, a tenor saxophonist. He played with Glenn Miller, Red Norvo, Benny Goodman and Artie Shaw.

== Early life ==
Jerome was born in Brooklyn, New York, and began playing the saxophone in high school in Plainfield, New Jersey.

== Career ==
Jerome was part of a national tour in 1936 with bandleader Harry Reser and his Clicquot Club Eskimos. He joined Glenn Miller's original orchestra in 1937 and was a member until it broke up in 1938. He played on the Glenn Miller recording "Doin' the Jive" in which he soloed. He then joined the Red Norvo band. He joined the Benny Goodman orchestra in 1938.

When Goodman broke up his band in 1940, he joined the Artie Shaw orchestra. While with Shaw he appeared in the 1940 film, Second Chorus, starring Fred Astaire and Burgess Meredith. By the end of the 1940s, Jerome became involved in broadcasting, variously working as a conductor, composer, arranger and musical director. He also composed the "Winston tastes good like a cigarette should" jingle for Winston cigarettes.

== Personal life and death ==
Jerome died in November 2001 at the age of 89.

== Discography ==
- The Jerry Jerome Trio (Vantage, 1944) with Teddy Wilson and Cozy Cole
- Something Old, Something New (Arbors, 1939–1996)
- Something Borrowed, Something Blue (Arbors, 1939–2001)
- Boca Raton Florida May 19, 1998 (Jazz Nite, 1998)
