= The Old Refrain =

1915 traditional pop song

Song by Fritz Kreisler
- Published: 1915
- Genre: Traditional pop
- Composer: Johann Brandl
- Lyricist: Alice Mattullath

"The Old Refrain" was a Viennese popular song ostensibly written by Fritz Kreisler but was actually a transcription of an earlier work by Johann Brandl ("Du alter Stefansturm" from Der liebe Augustin) with words by Alice Mattullath.

== Covers ==
Over the years this very popular song has been covered over 90 times.
