= Chummy MacGregor =

American jazz pianist and composer (1903–1973)

- MacGregor in an undated photo

Background information
- Born: John Chalmers MacGregor; May 28, 1903; Saginaw, Michigan, U.S.
- Died: May 9, 1973 (aged 69) Los Angeles, California, U.S.
- Genre: Jazz
- Occupations: Musician; composer
- Instrument: piano
- Years active: late 1920s – early 1940s
- Formerly of: Glenn Miller Orchestra

John Chalmers MacGregor (March 28, 1903, in Saginaw, Michigan – March 9, 1973, in Los Angeles, California), better known as Chummy MacGregor, a musician and composer, was the pianist in The Glenn Miller Orchestra from 1936 to 1942. He composed the songs "Moon Dreams", "It Must Be Jelly ('Cause Jam Don't Shake Like That)", "I Sustain the Wings", "Doin' the Jive", "Sold American", "Cutesie Pie" in 1932 with Bing Crosby and Red Standex, and "Slumber Song".

He co-wrote the song "Why Don't We Say We're Sorry?" for the post-war Glenn Miller Orchestra led by Tex Beneke in 1947.

He was portrayed by Harry Morgan in the 1954 Universal Pictures biopic The Glenn Miller Story.

== Career ==
As a young student, Chummy MacGregor attended the University of Michigan. A member of its Delta Tau Delta, he graduated in 1925. Before teaming with the legendary arranger, trombonist and band leader Glenn Miller, MacGregor played with jazz musician, songwriter and recording artist Irving Aaronson. In 1936 he became a sideman in the first Glenn Miller orchestra. Unsuccessful, that outfit disbanded in 1937. When Miller reformed his orchestra in 1938, MacGregor remained by his side. During its brief four-year history, The Glenn Miller Orchestra would sign a recording contract with RCA Victor, have it awarded the music industry's first gold record, star in a weekly radio series for the CBS Network and appear in two successful musical motion pictures for 20th Century Fox films. Considered by writers and critics as the most popular and commercially successful big band of the swing music era, MacGregor was a major contributor to its legacy. Between 1939 and 1943 the band would achieve twenty-three no.1 hit records on the Billboard, Variety and Hit Parade Magazine music charts, second only to vocalist Bing Crosby in that period. Original 78 rpm Miller records such as In the Mood, Tuxedo Junction and A String of Pearls are mainstays of 1940s popular music and cultural collector's items representing "the greatest generation." From the early 1950s into the 21st century hundreds of long play albums, extended play singles and compact disc reissue releases internationally continue the preservation of the original Miller recordings for future generations. The spirit of "the Miller sound" is also kept alive by countless World War II era dance bands and nostalgia radio and internet programming.

Actor Harry Morgan, a well known veteran of dozens of later television roles including December Bride, Dragnet and M*A*S*H, portrayed MacGregor in the 1953 Universal Pictures biography, The Glenn Miller Story. James Stewart and June Allyson were cast as Miller and his wife, Helen. MacGregor, seen as a close friend to Miller and his family, was a consultant and technical advisor to the film.

== Movie appearances ==
He was in the Twentieth Century Fox box office hit motion picture Sun Valley Serenade (1941) starring John Payne and Sonja Henie and its equally successful follow-up, Orchestra Wives (1942), starring George Montgomery and Ann Rutherford as part of the Glenn Miller Orchestra. Both films featured Miller and his band as themselves. He appeared, uncredited, in "Sun Valley Serenade" as part of the orchestra. He is on the piano as the Miller band is seen practicing Chattanooga Choo Choo. Leading man John Payne plays Ted Scott, band pianist in the film. For Orchestra Wives MacGregor played all keyboard parts and solos for actor Cesar Romero's role as the pianist in that film.

== Compositions by Chummy MacGregor ==
A noted songwriter and arranger, he wrote the songs "It Must Be Jelly ('Cause Jam Don't Shake Like That)" with George Williams for the Glenn Miller Orchestra in 1942, which was covered by Woody Herman in 1944 on Brunswick and as V-Disc 320B, and was also recorded by Harry James, Frankie Ford, and Johnny Long; "Slumber Song" with Saul Tepper; "Doin' the Jive" written with Glenn Miller in 1937; "Moon Dreams" with lyrics by Johnny Mercer, which was arranged by Gil Evans and recorded by Miles Davis on his 1957 Birth of the Cool album which was produced by Mercer's cousin Walter Rivers; "Sold American" with Glenn Miller; "Sometime" with Glenn Miller in 1939; "Solid As a Stonewall Jackson" with Jerry Gray; "Mister-Lucky-Me" in 1943; "Simply Grand"; "If Not For You"; "The Technical Training Command" with Glenn Miller and Sol Meyer in 1943; and, "I Sustain the Wings", composed with Glenn Miller, Norman Leyden, and Sol Meyer for the NBC radio series, which ran from 1943 to 1944. Chummy MacGregor also composed a series of songs with Charles Ives: "The Cage", "Berceuse", "Evidence", "Disclosure", "Down East", "Allegro", "The Camp Meeting", and "The Circus Band".

His composition "Moon Dreams" was recorded by Martha Tilton on April 6, 1942, at the first session for Capitol Records (then still being called Liberty Records) which was co-founded by Johnny Mercer, the co-writer of the song, and it was released as "Moondreams" on Capitol single 138 and Glenn Miller and the Army Air Force Band recorded the song in October 1944 and it was released as V-Disc, No. 201A. Herbie Mann, Hal McIntyre, Meredith D'Ambrosio, Gil Goldstein, Flavio Ambrosetti, Franz Koglmann, and Charlie Shoemake have also recorded the song.

His composition "Moon Dreams" was also featured in the 1988 motion picture 36 Fillette.

"Moon Dreams" was also featured on the soundtrack collection Ken Burns Jazz: The Story of America's Music (2000), in a performance by Miles Davis, arranged by Gil Evans. Miles Davis first performed the song in 1948 in concert in New York, a performance which appears on The Complete Birth of the Cool sessions collection.

In 2008, his composition "Moon Dreams" was featured in the Fox series The Simpsons in the episode "Mypods and Boomsticks" in a performance by Miles Davis.

He also co-wrote the song "Why Don't We Say We're Sorry?" which was released by the post-war Glenn Miller Orchestra led by Tex Beneke in 1947 on RCA Victor also featuring Garry Stevens and the Mello Larks along with Beneke on vocals.

== Honors ==
He played piano on three landmark Glenn Miller recordings that were inducted into the Grammy Hall of Fame: "Moonlight Serenade" (1939), "In the Mood" (1939), and "Chattanooga Choo Choo" (1941).
