= Ray Eberle =

American singer (1919–1979)

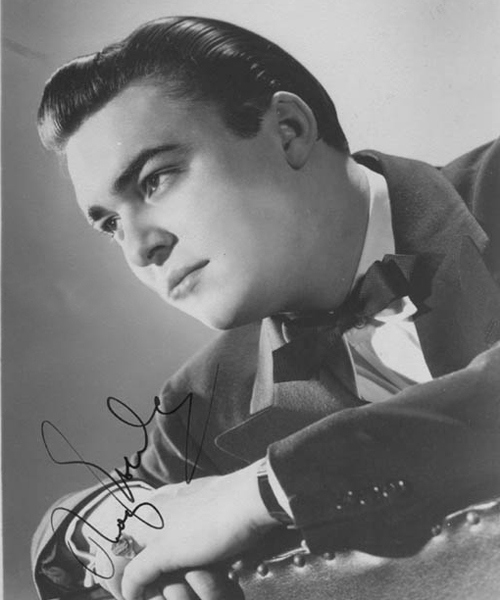
- Ray Eberle in 1943

Background information
- Born: Raymond Eberle; January 19, 1919; Mechanicville, New York, U.S.
- Died: August 25, 1979 (aged 60) Douglasville, Georgia, U.S.
- Genres: Big band; swing; traditional pop
- Occupation: Singer
- Instrument: vocals
- Years active: 1938–1979
- Formerly of: Glenn Miller Orchestra; Tex Beneke; Marion Hutton

Raymond Eberle (January 19, 1919 – August 25, 1979) was a vocalist during the Big Band Era, making his name with the Glenn Miller Orchestra. His elder brother, Bob Eberly, sang with the Jimmy Dorsey Orchestra.

== Career ==
Eberle was born in Mechanicville, Saratoga County, New York. His father, John A. Eberle, was a local policeman, sign-painter, and publican (tavern-keeper). His elder brother was Big Band singer Bob Eberly, who sang with the Jimmy Dorsey Orchestra. Ray started singing in his teens, with no formal training. In 1938, Glenn Miller, who was looking for a male vocalist for his big band, asked Bob Eberly if he had any siblings at home who could sing. Bob said "yes", and Ray was hired on the spot.

Eberle recalled walking by a table when his similar-looking brother was performing, and being stopped by Miller and invited to audition. Music critics and Miller's musicians were reportedly unhappy with Eberle's vocal style but Miller stuck with him. Critic George T. Simon said that Miller pitched Eberle's keys too high, straining Eberle's voice. Simon noted that when singing in lower keys, Eberle's sound was richer.

Eberle went on to find success with Miller, deeming the songs for Orchestra Wives, such as the jazz standard "At Last", to be among his favorites, as they were songs he could "sink my teeth into, and make a story out of". He appeared in the Twentieth Century Fox movies Sun Valley Serenade (1941) and Orchestra Wives (1942).

He made several Universal films, including Mister Big, making a cameo appearance as himself. Eberle mostly sang ballads. He led his own orchestra, called The Ray Eberle Orchestra, as well as the Serenade In Blue Orchestra from 1943, and maintained his band until his death in 1979. From 1940 to 1943 he did well on Billboard's "College Poll" for male vocalist. He also appeared on numerous television variety shows in the 1950s and 1960s.

Ray Eberle sang lead on "Sometime", composed by Glenn Miller in 1939, "Polka Dots and Moonbeams", "At Last", a number 9 chart hit on Billboard in 1942, and "To You", but Miller ran a tight ship and often fired people after one negative incident. Eberle was stuck in traffic one day during a Chicago engagement, and was late for a rehearsal. Miller fired him on the spot, and replaced him in June 1942 with Skip Nelson.

His 1949 album Starlight Serenade reached No. 5 in the US late that year.

After his departure from Miller, Eberle briefly joined Gene Krupa's band before launching a solo career. He later joined former Miller bandmate Tex Beneke's orchestra in 1970 for a national tour, and reformed his own orchestra later in the decade.

== Personal life ==
Eberle and his wife, Janet Eberle (née Young), had three children. He had two sons from his second marriage to Joanne Eberle (née Genthon). Ray Eberle died of a heart attack in Douglasville, Georgia, on August 25, 1979, aged 60.

== See also ==
- Ross Eberle, American author and grandson of Ray Eberle
