= George Williams (musician) =

George Dale "The Fox" Williams (November 5, 1917 – April 17, 1988) was a musician, composer, and an arranger for a number of major big bands, including Jimmie Lunceford, Glenn Miller, Gene Krupa, Sonny Dunham, and Ray Anthony.

== Career ==
He co-wrote and arranged the hit song "It Must Be Jelly ('Cause Jam Don't Shake like That)" with pianist Chummy MacGregor for Glenn Miller and "Gene's Boogie" with Gene Krupa. He arranged "Hamp's Boogie Woogie" for Lionel Hampton. He co-wrote with Ray Anthony his hit songs "Lackawanna Local" and "The Fox" and arranged "The Bunny Hop", co-written by Ray Anthony, and most of Anthony's recorded arrangements. He wrote arrangements for Harry James, Vaughn Monroe, Charlie Ventura, and his recording band, for which he produced two LPs and an EP in the late 1950s as a leader.

In addition, he arranged and conducted the music for Barbra Streisand's first commercial single, "Happy Days Are Here Again" (1962). Williams was a ghostwriter for the arrangements on Jackie Gleason's television show and arranged Gleason's albums in the 1950s and 1960s. Other performers for whom he wrote arrangements include: Count Basie, Mike Douglas, Les & Larry Elgart, Bobby Hackett and the Glenn Miller Orchestra.

== Discography ==
- The Fox in HiFi (Brunswick, 1955)
- Such Beautiful Music (RCA Victor, 1956)
- Swing Classics in Hi-Fi / Swing Classics in Stereo (United Artists, 1959)
- Put On Your Dancing Shoes (United Artists, 1960)

=== As Arranger or conductor ===
With Louis Bellson

- Big Band Jazz from the Summit (Roulette, 1962)

With Roy Eldridge

- Rockin' Chair (Clef, 1951)

== Sources ==
- Flower, John (1972). Moonlight Serenade: a bio-discography of the Glenn Miller Civilian Band. New Rochelle, NY: Arlington House. ISBN 0-87000-161-2.
- Miller, Glenn (1943). Glenn Miller's Method for Orchestral Arranging. New York: Mutual Music Society. ASIN: B0007DMEDQ
- Simon, George Thomas (1971). Simon Says. New York: Galahad. ISBN 0-88365-001-0.
- Simon, George Thomas (1980). Glenn Miller and His Orchestra. New York: Da Capo paperback. ISBN 0-306-80129-9.
