= Sold American =

1938 Brunswick 78, 8173.

"Sold American" is a 1938 song composed by Glenn Miller with John Chalmers "Chummy" MacGregor and recorded for both Brunswick and RCA Bluebird.

== Background ==
"Sold American" was written in 1938 by Miller and MacGregor, the pianist in the Glenn Miller Orchestra. The title was recorded on May 23, 1938 on Brunswick and again on June 27, 1939 for RCA Victor. A 78 was released in 1938 as Brunswick 8173, mx 22974-1, with "Dipper Mouth Blues". In 1939, a new recording was released as a Bluebird 78 A-side, 10352A, with "Pagan Love Song". Glenn Miller arranged both songs.

The song features a chant by the orchestra repeated twice at the beginning and twice at the ending: "Sold! American!" The music starts off in the style and tempo of a pavane.

The title is based on an American Tobacco Company (ATC) radio ad jingle of the 1930s for Lucky Strike cigarettes, featuring a tobacco auctioneer chant delivered by North Carolina tobacco auctioneer Lee Aubrey "Speed" Riggs, which ended with the phrase, "Sold, American!", stressing that American only purchased the highest quality tobacco for its cigarettes. The jingle achieved national exposure through ATC's sponsorship of Your Hit Parade, a weekly radio show that featured a countdown of the top national hits.

Glenn Miller was sponsored by Chesterfield cigarettes in 1939, owned by the Liggett and Myers Tobacco Company. Their slogan was: "They satisfy!" There was a conflict of interest. Being sponsored by Chesterfield, Miller could not promote a competing brand, Lucky Strike. This restricted the performances of the song.

Miller had used the opening musical motif in his arrangement of the 1934 recording of "I Hate Myself (For Being Mean To You)" by The Boswell Sisters. He also used the motif in his arrangement of the Ray Noble recording of "Big Chief De Sota" and his 1935 arrangement of "You're O.K." by the Dorsey Brothers on Decca Records.

The song was performed live by Glenn Miller on March 8, 1939, and broadcast on the radio from a remote at the Meadowbrook Ballroom in Cedar Grove, New Jersey. "Sold American" was released as a single in the UK paired with "Moon Love" on the His Master's Voice label as BD5854. The 1938 recording, Matrix number B 22974-1, was also released as Vocalion 4449, Okeh 4449, Brunswick 81677 in Germany, Columbia DO-2783 in Australia, Philips B 21543 in Australia, on Lucky 60514 in Japan, and was reissued by Biltmore Records as 1108 in the 1949-1951 period. In the 1950s, Epic Records re-released the Brunswick 78 in the U.S. as part of a 10" yellow label album entitled The Glenn Miller Band as LN 1101.

This song is different from the 1973 Kinky Friedman song of the same name, which featured on the eponymous album on Vanguard.

== Album appearances ==
"Sold American" appeared on the 1961 RCA Victor LP album The Great Dance Bands of the '30s & '40s: Never Before on LP by Glenn Miller and his Orchestra as RCA LPM-2080. The RCA Victor Bluebird version from 1939 is also on the 13 disc CD collection The Complete Glenn Miller (1938-1942) by BMG/RCA and on the 2005 series The Glenn Miller Story, Vols. 5-6. The 1938 Brunswick version is on the album The Glenn Miller Story, Vols. 1-2. The collection Evolution of a Band (Columbia CD CK-48831) contains an unissued, alternate take, mx-22974-2. The song is also on the 2008 compilation The Swing of Things on Werner Last's Favourites Swing, Glenn Miller and His Orchestra: 1935-1938, Classics, 2004, and the 2009 album Big Bands: The Giants of the Swing Big Band Era on Documents.

== Sources ==
- Flower, John. Moonlight Serenade: A Bio-discography of the Glenn Miller Civilian Band. New Rochelle, NY: Arlington House, 1972.
- Simon, George Thomas. Simon Says. New York: Galahad, 1971. ISBN 0-88365-001-0.
- Simon, George Thomas. Glenn Miller and His Orchestra. NY: Crowell, 1974.
