= It Must Be Jelly ('Cause Jam Don't Shake like That) =

Song performed by Glenn Miller

- The 1944 U.S. sheet music cover, Mutual Music Society, (left), against the 1944 UK sheet music cover, Chappell & Co., (right)

Single by Glenn Miller and His Orchestra
- B-side: "Rainbow Rhapsody"
- Released: 1942
- Recorded: July 15, 1942
- Studio: RCA Studios New York
- Genre: Swing; Traditional pop
- Length: 3:14
- Label: RCA Victor 20-1546-A
- Composers: Chummy MacGregor; George Williams
- Lyricist: Sunny Skylar

"It Must Be Jelly ('Cause Jam Don't Shake like That)" is a 1942 jazz and pop song recorded by Glenn Miller and His Orchestra. The song was released as an RCA 78 single by Glenn Miller in 1944. Woody Herman also released the song as a single and as a V-Disc.

== Background ==
1944 RCA Victor 78 single release by Glenn Miller, 20-1546-A

The music for Glenn Miller's version of "It Must Be Jelly" was composed by Chummy MacGregor and George "The Fox" Williams (who also arranged it), with lyrics by Sunny Skylar. A version was also recorded by the Army Air Force band under Glenn Miller. Sheet music was published in the U.S. by Mutual Music Society, Inc., New York, N.Y. In the UK, the sheet music was published by Chappell & Co., Ltd., London. The March 23, 1944, Woody Herman studio recording in New York featured the additional lyrics written by Sunny Skylar, sung by Herman and Frances Wayne.

The expression "It must be jelly 'cause jam don't shake like that", or variations of it, was a popular slang phrase. There had been earlier songs that used a similar phrase: "It Must Be Jelly ('Cause Jam Don't Shake That Way)" by the Hipp Cats, recorded on August 13, 1938, and the 1940 song "(It Must Be Jelly 'Cos You Know) Jam Don't Shake" by Frankie "Half-Pint" Jaxon. The lyrics and the music, however, are completely different in all three songs.

The song was first recorded on July 15, 1942, by Glenn Miller and His Orchestra at Victor Studios, Chicago, Illinois, in a Wednesday session that lasted from 11:00 a.m. to 3:15 p.m. in one take. The 1942 lyrics to the song as recorded by Glenn Miller were: "It must be jelly 'cause jam don't shake like that / It must be jelly 'cause jam don't shake like that / Oh Mama, you're so big and fat!"

The Glenn Miller civilian band played the same arrangement that was performed at least twice, available on a RCA Victor 78 recording, Victor 20-1546-A, recorded July 15, 1942. There is also a version taken from a radio remote broadcast from September 15, 1942 in Boston, Massachusetts and later re-released by RCA Victor on LPT 6700.

"It Must Be Jelly ('Cause Jam Don't Shake Like That)" was the first song performed on the October 16, 1943, radio program I Sustain the Wings with the Army Air Force Band.

The 78 single, Victor 20-1546, reached number twelve on the Billboard charts in January, 1944, where it stayed for eight weeks on the charts. Moreover, the record was a crossover hit, reaching number two on the Billboard 'Harlem' Hit Parade Chart on February 19, 1944, the then equivalent of the later R&B chart, and number sixteen on the Billboard Juke Box Chart.

An ad for the RCA Victor release appeared in the December 11, 1943, issue of Billboard magazine.

=== Personnel ===
- Reeds: Lloyd "Skip" Martin (asax), Ernie Caceres (asax, barsax, clt), Wilbur Schwartz (asax, clt), Tex Beneke (tsax), Al Klink (tsax)
- Trumpets: Billy May, Steve Lipkins, Dale McMickle, Johnny Best
- Trombones: Glenn Miller, Jimmy Priddy, Paul Tanner, Frank D'Annolfo
- Rhythm: Bobby Hackett (gtr), Chummy MacGregor (p), Doc Goldberg (db), Maurice Purtill (dr)

The vocals were by The Modernaires, consisting of Ralph Brewster, Bill Conway, Hal Dickinson, Chuck Goldstein, and Paula Kelly.

== Other recordings ==
Harry James, Johnny Long, Back Alley Hoodoo, and Frankie Ford also recorded versions. Woody Herman released a studio recording in 1944 on Brunswick and Decca Records in the UK as a 78 A side single, 03541, and on Coral Records in the U.S. as 60066, singing the Sunny Skylar lyrics in a duet with Frances Wayne. Ray McKinley performed the song with the New Glenn Miller Orchestra on the fourth episode of the 1961 TV series Glenn Miller Time. The Jay Rayner Quartet released a live version recorded at the Zedel in London on the collection It Must be Jelly and Other Stories ... on Fane Phonics in the UK. The song also appeared on their CD collection A Night of Food and Agony.

== Wartime release ==
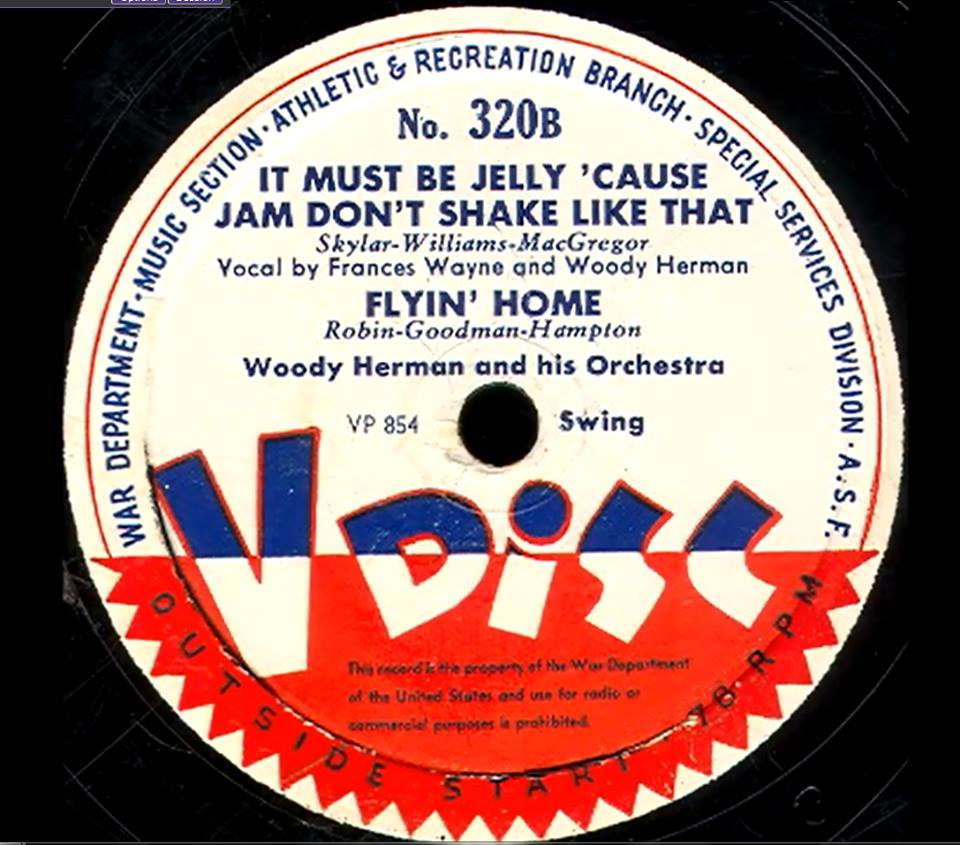
World War II release by the U.S. War Department as a V-Disc 78 single, No. 320B

The U.S. War Department released the Woody Herman studio recording as a U.S. Army V-Disc, No. 320B, in November, 1944. The recording was the studio release featuring Woody Herman and Frances Wayne in a duet on vocals.
