= Solo Hop =

1935 Columbia 78, CO-3058-D.

1941 Columbia red label re-issue, 35881.

Solo Hop is a 1935 instrumental composed by Glenn Miller and released as a Columbia 78 single. The recording was part of Glenn Miller's earliest sessions as a leader recording under his own name.

== Background ==
Solo Hop was a Top Ten hit from the summer of 1935 according to the official Glenn Miller Orchestra webpage. Glenn Miller composed the instrumental for a pick-up band when he started recording for Columbia Records. "Solo Hop" featured an all-star line-up led by Bunny Berigan on trumpet, future bandleader Claude Thornhill on piano and future bandleader Charlie Spivak on trumpet.

The song was recorded on April 25, 1935 in New York City. It was released by Columbia as a 78 single backed with "In a Little Spanish Town", label number CO-3058-D, Matrix number 17382-1. According to the tsort.info website data base, based on the research of Billboard chart analyst Joel Whitburn, "Solo Hop" reached number seven on the Billboard chart in 1935, staying on the charts for five weeks. Billboard did not have a national chart for singles until 1940. George Thomas Simon, a biographer and friend of Glenn Miller's, however, contradicts sources that claim it was a top ten hit and wrote that it was barely noticed by record buyers.

The recording was reissued by Biltmore Records as a 78, 1045, in the 1949-1951 period. The record was also released as a Columbia Records red label 78, 35881, as part of the "A Hot Jazz Classic" series in 1941, Columbia FB-1150, Columbia SEG 8709, Columbia 33 SX 1462, and Columbia 33 SX 1491 in the UK, Columbia C 83404 in Germany, Epic EG-7005, Epic LN-3236, Epic LG-3109, Epic LA 16002, Epic LA 16006, Philips P-23588-H in Argentina, and as Philips BBR 8092 and BBL 7086 in the UK.

== Personnel ==
Philips 78, P-23588-H, released in Argentina.

The personnel on the "Solo Hop" session were Glenn Miller on trombone, Bunny Berigan and Charlie Spivak on trumpets, Claude Thornhill on piano, Eddie Miller on tenor saxophone, Johnny Mince on clarinet and alto saxophone, Larry Hall on guitar, Delmar Kaplan on bass, and Ray Bauduc on drums. "Solo Hop" was arranged by Glenn Miller.

== Appearances on Compilations ==
"Solo Hop" has appeared on the following compilation albums:

- The Glenn Miller Story, Vols. 1-2, Avid Entertainment, 2004.
- Glenn Miller and His Orchestra: 1935-1938, Classics, 2004.
- The Best of the Big Bands, Sony Special Products, 1997.
- The Complete Early Recordings, Opus Kura, 2004.
- Collector's Choice/Vintage Glenn Miller, Columbia, 1990.
- Radio Days, Vol. 2, WNTS, 2008.

== Sources ==
- Simon, George Thomas. Simon Says. New York: Galahad, 1971. ISBN 0-88365-001-0.
- Simon, George Thomas. Glenn Miller and His Orchestra. NY: Crowell, 1974.
- Flower, John. Moonlight Serenade: A Bio-discography of the Glenn Miller Civilian Band. New Rochelle, NY: Arlington House, 1972.
