= Doin' the Jive =

- 1938 Brunswick 78, 8063.

Single by Glenn Miller and His Orchestra
- A-side: "Doin' the Jive"
- B-side: "Humoresque"
- Released: 1938
- Recorded: November 29, 1937
- Genre: Swing music, jazz, dance, big band
- Length: 3:01
- Label: Brunswick
- Songwriters: Glenn Miller, Chummy MacGregor

Glenn Miller and His Orchestra singles chronology
"Every Day's a Holiday"	"Doin' the Jive"	"Don't Wake Up My Heart"

Alternative cover
- 1938 Vocalion 78, 5131.

"Doin' the Jive" is a 1938 song composed by Glenn Miller and pianist Chummy MacGregor. The song was released as a 78 single by Glenn Miller and His Orchestra on Brunswick Records.

Doin' the Jive was recorded for Brunswick on November 29, 1937, and released as Brunswick 8063 backed with a Big Band arrangement of Antonin Dvořák's 1894 "Humoresque" and as Vocalion 5131 backed with "Dipper Mouth Blues".

The song features lyrics sung by Kathleen Lane and the band that introduced a new dance, "The Jive": "You clap your hands/And you swing out wide/Do the Suzie Q/Mix in a step or two/Put 'em all together/And you're doin' the jive". There is rap dialogue between Glenn Miller and Jerry "Buck" Jerome. The solos are by Jerry "Buck" Jerome on tenor sax and Irving Fazola Prestopnick, known as "Faz", on clarinet. A second version was released with Tex Beneke in the dialogue with Glenn Miller from a June 20, 1938 NBC radio broadcast from the Paradise Restaurant in New York City featuring Gail Reese on lead vocals.

Glenn Miller biographer and confidant George T. Simon reviewed the song in the March, 1938 issue of Metronome magazine, describing it as "much swing, fun, and good Kitty Lane singing." The band contributes vocals along with Glenn Miller and Jerry Jerome. The song was arranged by Glenn Miller. The song was listed as number 55 in the Glenn Miller library of arrangements.

"Doin' the Jive" was released on the following record labels as a 78 single and as an album or EP track: Brunswick Records 8062, Vocalion Records 5131, Okeh Records 5131, Conqueror Records 9489, Polygon Records 6001, Epic Records EG-7034 as a four track Extended Play or EP, Epic LG-1008, Philips (England) BBR 8072, Epic EG-1008, and Columbia (England) DB 8072.

The Glenn Miller recording appears on the 1992 Sony compilation Evolution of a Band, The Glenn Miller Story, Vols. 1-2 on Avid, Glenn Miller and His Orchestra: 1935-1938, Classics, 2004, Community Swing, Vol. 2, 1937-1938, Naxos Jazz Legends, 2003, The Complete Early Recordings, Opus Kura, 2004, and the 2003 Sony various artists collection Jazz Legends: Swing and Big Bands.

== Other recordings ==
Belgian bandleader Emile Deltour, under the pseudonym Eddie Tower, recorded a version on November 10, 1940 which was released as a Telefunken 78 single, A10232. Samuéla Burenstrand recorded "Doin' the Jive" live in 2006. The Seattle-based group The Careless Lovers recorded the song in 2012. "Doin' the Jive" was remixed in 2012 by RJGisinthehouse on YouTube in a techno, electronica, dance club mix. The Original Swingtime Big Band has also performed the song in concert in 2012. Dock Side Drive recorded the song on the 2016 release As Long as I'm Singing. Guitarist Stephen Bennett has recorded the song in an arrangement for acoustic guitar on the 2017 album Fifty Years, and Counting. The Ballroomshakers released a recording on their 2018 album Rockin' is Our Business. The Glenn Miller Orchestra Scandinavia has also performed the song as part of their concert setlist in Sweden in 2018.

In 2014, Austrian electro swing performer Parov Stelar released a "remix" or song sample version of the song as "Clap Your Hands" in an electro swing style that reached no. 52 on the Austrian singles chart. He released the song as part of an eponymous EP in 2014 and on the 2015 album Demon Diaries.

The Glenn Miller Orchestra performed the song live at a June 14, 2025 concert featuring a 1937 concert presentation at the Glenn Miller Birthplace Society (GMBS) 2025 Glenn Miller Festival in Clarinda, Iowa. The performance featured Music Director and tenor saxophonist Erik Stabnau and vocalist Jenny Swoish.

== Radio broadcasts ==
"Doin' the Jive" was performed by Glenn Miller and His Orchestra and broadcast on the radio on the following dates: July 24, 1937 at the Hotel Roosevelt for a New Orleans broadcast, August 27, 1937 at the Adolphus Hotel for a Dallas broadcast, November 30, 1937 at the Raymor Hotel for a Boston broadcast, and on June 20, 1938 at the Paradise Restaurant featuring Gail Reese on vocals and Tex Beneke on saxophone for a New York City broadcast.

Release on Conqueror Records, 1938.

The live radio broadcast of "Doin' the Jive" from June 20, 1938 at the Paradise Restaurant was released in 1954 by RCA Victor as LPT 6701 on a five record compilation box set. RCA Victor had the rights to the live, radio broadcast version while Columbia held the rights to the studio version. The album was entitled Glenn Miller and His Orchestra, Collector's Issue, Limited Edition, Volume Two, with each set numbered.

== Personnel ==
The personnel on the 1937 Brunswick studio recording session for "Doin' the Jive" were: Trombones: Glenn Miller, Jesse Ralph, Bud Smith; Trumpets: George "Pee Wee" Erwin, Bob Price, Ardell Garrett; Reeds: Hal McIntyre, as, Tony Viola, as, Irving "Fazola" Prestopnick, clt, as, Jerry Jerome, ts, Carl Biesecker, ts; John Chummy MacGregor, piano; Carmen Mastren, guitar; Rowland Bundock, bass; and Doc Carney (Cenardo), drums. Kathleen Lane sang the lead vocals. The recording was made in Brunswick studios in New York. The arrangement was by Glenn Miller.

The drummer on the 1937 session was Doc Carney Cenardo. In his 1974 biography Glenn Miller and His Orchestra, George Thomas Simon wrote: "Without realizing it, the Miller band had broken the color line."

== Sources ==
- Simon, George Thomas. Glenn Miller and His Orchestra. NY: Crowell, 1974.
- Flower, John. Moonlight Serenade: A Bio-discography of the Glenn Miller Civilian Band. New Rochelle, NY: Arlington House, 1972.
- Flower, John. Liner Notes to the CD collection Community Swing, Vol. 2, 1937-1938, Naxos Jazz Legends, 2003.
