= Introduction to a Waltz =

"Introduction to a Waltz" as part of a 1952 RCA Victor 45 EP, EPBT 3001.

"Introduction to a Waltz" is a 1941 swing jazz instrumental by Glenn Miller. The instrumental was featured on two radio broadcasts of the Chesterfield program and was released as a 45 EP single.

== Background ==
The instrumental was composed by Glenn Miller, Jerry Gray, and Hal Dickinson in 1941. The song was never commercially recorded for Bluebird. Two air checks were issued, one from December 11, 1941, on LPT-6700 from a Chesterfield Broadcast. The other is from March 20, 1942, also from a Chesterfield Broadcast issued on LPT-3001.

Glenn Miller introduced the instrumental before the performance: "'Introduction to a Waltz' has quite an introduction-–-187 bars to be exact, with 8 bars of 'waltz' near the end of the tune." The performances featured Billy May on trumpet, Tex Beneke on tenor saxophone, Chummy MacGregor on piano, and Moe Purtill on drums.

"Introduction to a Waltz" by Glenn Miller and his Orchestra was also released as a 7" vinyl 45 Extended Play single by RCA Victor as EPBT 3001, Glenn Miller Concert, Vol. 3, a 45 double pack, featuring the March 20, 1942 broadcast version.

The instrumental also appears on the 1953 UK release Glenn Miller: A Glenn Miller Concert, a 24-track set of three 10" LPs, DLP1012/13/21, with picture sleeve, on His Master's Voice, the 1994 album The Glenn Miller Orchestra: Real Stereo 1941 on the Jazz Hour label, the 2002 various artists collection Swing Era Big Band on Frémeaux/Frémeaux & Associés, on the 2011 album 75 Glenn Miller Masterpieces by Glenn Miller and his Orchestra on Sepia as 1165, and the 2003 album Swinging Miller Thrillers by The Glenn Miller Orchestra on Jasmine Records.

== Sources ==
- Flower, John. Moonlight Serenade: A Bio-discography of the Glenn Miller Civilian Band. New Rochelle, NY: Arlington House, 1972.
- Simon, George Thomas. Glenn Miller and His Orchestra. New York, NY: Thomas Y. Crowell Company, 1974.
- Simon, George T. Simon Says: The Sights and Sounds of the Swing Era, 1935-1955. New Rochelle, NY: Arlington House, 1971.
- Simon, George T. The Big Bands. New York, NY: Macmillan, 1967.
