= I Sustain the Wings =

1943 jazz instrumental co-written by Glenn Miller

The sheet music for "I Sustain the Wings" first appeared in the 1943 Glenn Miller's Dance Folio songbook, Mutual Music Society, New York.

"I Sustain the Wings" is a 1943 big band and jazz instrumental co-written by Glenn Miller. The instrumental was the theme for the eponymous radio program broadcast on CBS and NBC from 1943 to 1945.

== Background ==
"I Sustain the Wings" was composed by Captain Glenn Miller, John Chalmers Chummy MacGregor, Private Sol Meyer, and M/Sgt. Norman Leyden. The song was copyrighted on February 11, 1943. This was the theme music for the radio program that was broadcast weekly on Saturday on NBC from September 18, 1943, to June 10, 1944, by the Army Air Force Band under the direction of Captain Glenn Miller. The radio show was initially on CBS from June to September, 1943. Glenn Miller was the host and conductor on the show, which also featured Ray McKinley, Jerry Gray, Johnny Desmond, and the Crew Chiefs, until June 10, 1944, when Harry Bluestone became the conductor. The Latin Sustineo Alas, "I Sustain the Wings", or "Keep 'Em Flying", was the motto of the U.S. Army Air Forces Technical Training Command. The I Sustain the Wings radio series continued until November 17, 1945. In a 1948 history of wartime radio, Edward M. Kirby and Jack W. Harris described Miller’s Army Air Forces band as a network favorite and an important morale-builder in the European Theater of Operations. They also wrote that his program I Sustain the Wings “reached millions of teen-agers, from whose ranks the air cadets would be drawn.”

The sheet music for the composition appeared in the 1943 songbook Glenn Miller's Dance Folio published by the Mutual Music Society in New York. The opening lines are: "For the land that I love, I sustain the wings/ In the sky above where they fight to victory/ There's a plane in the sky, and the song it sings/ Is the freedom cry and a pray'r for you and me."

The instrumental appears on the 1996 RCA Victor album The Secret Broadcasts and the 2005 The Missing Chapters Vol. 3: All's Well Mademoiselle collection released by Avid Entertainment. The instrumental also appears uncredited as the segue music between songs on the U.S. Army V-Disc No. 144, VP 415, released in March, 1944.

Tex Beneke performed a version of the instrumental with the Glenn Miller Alumni/Stars for Defense/The Modernaires in 1960 on a Stars for Defense Show. The Airmen of Note band of the U.S. Air Force has recorded the instrumental. The song appeared on the 2011 collection Those Were Our Songs: Hits from World War II performed by the U.S. Air Force Orchestra conducted by Lowell Graham on Altissimo! Recordings. The theme was also performed and recorded by the Army Air Forces Overseas Orchestra conducted by Sgt. Jerry Gray. The Tom Daugherty Orchestra performed the instrumental on tour in 2012.

The instrumental appeared on the CD collection 75th Anniversary Tribute: Glenn Miller and The Army Air Force Band on Sounds of Yesteryear in 2020.

Major Glenn Miller and the American Band of the Allied Expeditionary Force also made recordings for the BBC and the Office of War Information (OWI) from October 30 to November 20, 1944, at Abbey Road Studios in London that were broadcast over the American Broadcasting Station in Europe to Germany in a program called Music for the Wehrmacht or The Wehrmacht Hour. General James H. Doolittle, Commanding General of the US 8th Army Air Force, told Miller: "Captain Miller, next to a letter from home your organization is the greatest morale-builder in the European Theater of Operations."

The USAAF Technical Training Command insignia during World War II included a badge that featured the motto in Latin "Sustineo Alas", or "I Sustain the Wings". The badge was used from July, 1942 until 1946. The badge was worn on the uniform tunic lapel or on the soft cap.
