= Biltmore Records =

American record label (1949–1951)

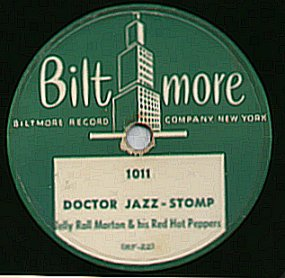
Label of a Biltmore Record by Jelly Roll Morton

Biltmore Records was a United States–based record label active from 1949 through 1951. The label was headquartered in New York City. Biltmore Records were often reissues of recordings no longer in the catalogues of other labels, such as Columbia Records and Brunswick Records. When RCA Victor found out that Biltmore were making unauthorized reissues of material originally recorded by Victor, they sued Biltmore, putting Biltmore out of business.

They rereleased recordings by Glenn Miller and His Orchestra recorded for Columbia and Brunswick, Benny Goodman, the Original Dixieland Jazz Band, Duke Ellington, Bix Beiderbecke, and Paul Whiteman. They also re-released records by Louis Armstrong, King Oliver, Jelly Roll Morton, Johnny Dodds, and Bessie Smith.

== See also ==
- List of record labels
