= Community Swing =

1937 Brunswick 78, 7923.

Community Swing is a swing jazz instrumental composed and recorded by Glenn Miller and released as a Brunswick Records 78 single in 1937 by Glenn Miller and His Orchestra.

== Background ==
Community Swing was composed by Glenn Miller in 1937 and recorded on June 9, 1937 at the Brunswick studios in New York and released as a Brunswick 78, 7923, Matrix #B 21236-1, backed with "Sleepy Time Gal". The instrumental was listed as number 1 or the first in the Glenn Miller library of arrangements. Arranged by Glenn Miller, the instrumental featured Charlie Spivak and Mannie Klein on trumpet, Hal McIntyre on clarinet, and George T. Simon on drums. Glenn Miller used this arrangement in 1936 when he was a guest conductor with the NBC orchestra. The 78 release on Vocalion Records in the UK, S-127, B-21236-1, was reviewed in the February, 1938 issue of the British classical music magazine Gramophone:

Many of you will remember Glenn Miller as one of the chief arrangers for the Dorsey Brothers when they ran a joint orchestra, and Red Nichols in the days of the Five Pennies. He is also of course one of the best trombone players of the old jazz school.

One of Miller's pet devices was to bestow a rich warmth of tone colour on a simple melody by scoring it in close harmony for instruments playing in the lower register, with comparatively little deviation from the original theme or intricate weaving of counter melodic effects. ...

"Community Swing" as a composition is more on the lick-and-answer principle... But even here one finds Miller's penchant for quality and richness of tone, and the same nice, clean straightforward phrasing.

Jazz critic and journalist Paul Eduard Miller reviewed the composition in the August, 1937 issue of Down Beat: "Miller’s own tune, is a snappy arrangement, ensemble for the most part."

The song was performed on a January 16, 1937 Saturday Night Swing Club radio broadcast with Glenn Miller conducting. Glenn Miller and His Orchestra also performed the song on July 21, 1937 and August 23, 1937 from the Hotel Roosevelt for a New Orleans radio broadcast.

The instrumental also appeared as Polygon 78 6002, Epic EG-7034, Epic LG-1008, Philips BBR 8072 in the UK, Vocalion S.127 in the UK, Epic LN 1101, Epic EG-1008, and on Lucky in Japan as 760514.

The Glenn Miller Orchestra performed the song live at a June 14, 2025 concert featuring a 1937 concert presentation at the Glenn Miller Birthplace Society (GMBS) 2025 Glenn Miller Festival in Clarinda, Iowa.

== Personnel ==
The personnel on the session featured Glenn Miller, Jesse Ralph, Harry Rodgers, and Jerry Jerome on trombone, George Siravo and Hal McIntyre on alto sax, Carl Biesecker on tenor sax, Charlie Spivak, Mannie Klein, and Sterling Bose on trumpets, Howard Smith on piano, Dick McDonough on guitar, Ted Kotsoftis on bass, and George T. Simon on drums.

== Discography ==
- Best of Big Bands: Evolution of a Band, Sony, 1992.
- The Early Years: Original Band Recordings, Halcyon Records, UK, 1996.
- The Glenn Miller Story: Vols 1-2, Avid, 2005.
- Community Swing: 1937-1938: Vol. 2, Early Original Recordings, 1937-1938, Naxos Jazz Legends, 2002.
- Sold American: Early Glenn Miller, Vol. 3, Jazz Classics, 2011.

== Sources ==
- Flower, John (1972). Moonlight Serenade: a bio-discography of the Glenn Miller Civilian Band. New Rochelle, NY: Arlington House. ISBN 0-87000-161-2.
- Miller, Glenn (1943). Glenn Miller's Method for Orchestral Arranging. New York: Mutual Music Society. ASIN: B0007DMEDQ
- Simon, George Thomas (1980). Glenn Miller and His Orchestra. New York: Da Capo paperback. ISBN 0-306-80129-9.
- Simon, George Thomas (1971). Simon Says. New York: Galahad. ISBN 0-88365-001-0.
- Schuller, Gunther (1991). The Swing Era: The Development of Jazz, 1930–1945, Vol. 2. New York: Oxford University Press. ISBN 0-19-507140-9.
- Sudhalter, Richard (1999). Lost Chords. New York: Oxford University Press. ISBN 0-19-514838-X
