= Sometime (Glenn Miller song) =

1963 LP album Glenn Miller: On the Air, Volume 3, LSP 2769, RCA Victor.

Sometime is a 1939 song composed by Glenn Miller, Chummy MacGregor, and Mitchell Parish and performed for radio broadcast only. The song was never recorded in the studio but was performed live for remote radio broadcast on the Mutual and Blue Network from the Meadowbrook Ballroom in Cedar Grove, New Jersey.

== Background ==
Sometime was a pop ballad with lyrics and music composed by Glenn Miller with Chummy MacGregor and Mitchell Parish in 1939 and first sung by Ray Eberle. The published musical score, copyrighted on September 27, 1940, lists the composers as Glenn Miller, Chummy MacGregor, and lyricist Mitchell Parish. "Sometime" was performed for radio broadcast and two airchecks have been released of the song. "Sometime" was first performed on March 5, 1939, at Frank Dailey's Meadowbrook Ballroom in Cedar Grove, New Jersey. The song was also performed at the Meadowbrook on March 26, April 7, and April 18, 1939, which recording was released on the 1963 album Glenn Miller: On the Air, on a single volume of a three-volume album, RCA Victor LPM/LSP 2769, Volume 3, and as a three record set, 6101, and as RCA album RD/SF 7612, Volume 3, in the UK. The announcer introduced the song as follows: "Now comes a number that was originated right here in the band. Glenn and Mac the piano player got together and wrote it. Ray Eberle sings it. The title: 'Sometime'." This song is different from the Gus Kahn and Ted Fiorito song of the same name from 1925 and the 1918 Rudolf Friml and Rida Johnson Young song from their musical of the same name.

The song was first released commercially by RCA Victor in 1963 on the album Glenn Miller: On the Air, Volume 3, LSP 2769(e), and as a three record box set, 6101. The liner notes for the album by Brad McCuen described the song as follows: "Glenn and his close friend Chummy MacGregor, the band's pianist, collaborated on this quality pop song. It is a mystery why Glenn did not include this song among the hundreds he later recorded. Ray Eberle has the vocal." The version included was the April 18, 1939 performance at the Meadowbrook.

There were five broadcast performances of “Sometime” by Glenn Miller and his Orchestra in 1939. It is Score 117 in the library and the composer credits are listed as Glenn Miller and John Chalmers MacGregor.

The performances were recorded and featured vocals by Ray Eberle:

1) March 5, 1939, at Meadowbrook; 2) March 6, 1939, Meadowbrook; 3) March 27, 1939, Meadowbrook; 4) April 7, 1939, Meadowbrook; and, 5) April 18, 1939, Meadowbrook.

== Album Appearances ==
- Glenn Miller: On the Air, Volume 3, single disc LP, LSP 2769(e), RCA Victor, 1963.
- Glenn Miller: On the Air, 3 disc LP box set, LSP-6101(e), RCA Victor, 1963.
- Dance Time U.S.A.: 1939-1940, Magic, 1991.
- Glenn Miller: The Broadcast Archives: Volumes 1 and 2, Avid Entertainment, 2005.
- The Glenn Miller Orchestra: The Broadcast Archives, Vol. 2, Avid, 2000.
- Glenn Miller on Air, Volume 3: King Porter Stomp, T.B. Jazz Classics, 2009.
- That's Jazz, Simply the Best, 2011.
- Glenn Miller: Legend Lives On, Ember, 1998.
- Down South Camp Meetin': Broadcast Archives, Vol. 1, Avid, 2000.
- The Legend Lives On, Vols. 1–2, Ember, 2002.

== Personnel ==
Ray Eberle sang the vocals on the two broadcasts that were released from the radio airchecks. Glenn Miller played trombone while Chummy MacGregor was on piano.

== Sources ==
- Flower, John (1972). Moonlight Serenade: a bio-discography of the Glenn Miller Civilian Band. New Rochelle, NY: Arlington House. ISBN 0-87000-161-2.
- Miller, Glenn (1943). Glenn Miller's Method for Orchestral Arranging. New York: Mutual Music Society. ASIN: B0007DMEDQ
- Simon, George Thomas (1980). Glenn Miller and His Orchestra. New York: Da Capo paperback. ISBN 0-306-80129-9.
- Simon, George Thomas (1971). Simon Says. New York: Galahad. ISBN 0-88365-001-0.
- Schuller, Gunther (1991). The Swing Era: The Development of Jazz, 1930–1945, Vol. 2. New York: Oxford University Press. ISBN 0-19-507140-9.
- Sudhalter, Richard (1999). Lost Chords. New York: Oxford University Press. ISBN 0-19-514838-X
