= Every Day's a Holiday (song) =

1938 release as a Brunswick 78, 8041.

"Every Day's a Holiday" is a song written by Sam Coslow and Barry Trivers. The song was recorded by Glenn Miller and His Orchestra on Brunswick Records in 1938.

The song was released as a Brunswick 78 single, 8071, backed with "Sweet Stranger", in January, 1938 by Glenn Miller and his Orchestra which reached number 17 on Billboard, staying on the charts for one week. The vocals were by Kathleen Lane.

The song was featured in the 1937 Paramount Pictures film Every Day's a Holiday sung by Mae West.
