= Jerry Gray (arranger) =

American violinist and swing dance orchestra leader (1915–1976)

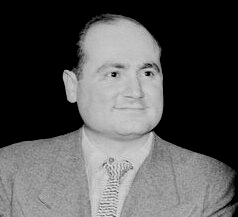
- Gray in the late 1940s

Background information
- Born: Generoso Graziano; July 3, 1915; East Boston, Massachusetts, U.S.
- Died: August 10, 1976 (aged 61) Dallas, Texas, U.S.
- Genres: Swing, jazz
- Occupations: Bandleader, composer, arranger, musician
- Instrument: Violin
- Years active: 1930s–1970s
- Labels: Decca

Jerry Gray (born Generoso Graziano; July 3, 1915 – August 10, 1976) was an American violinist, arranger, composer, and leader of swing dance orchestras (big bands) bearing his name. He is widely known for his work with jazz and popular music during the Swing era. He worked with the bandleaders Artie Shaw and Glenn Miller.

== Early life ==
Jerry Gray was born Generoso Graziano in East Boston, Massachusetts, United States. His father, Albert Graziano, was a music teacher who began teaching his son violin at age seven. As a teenager Graziano studied with Emanuel Ondříček and was a soloist with the Boston Junior Symphony Orchestra.

== Early career ==
In 1936, Gray joined Artie Shaw (then calling himself Art Shaw) and his "New Music" orchestra as lead violinist. He studied musical arrangement under Shaw and became a staff arranger a year later. During the next two years he penned some of the band's most popular arrangements, including "Carioca", "Softly, As in a Morning Sunrise", "Any Old Time", and "Begin the Beguine."

In November 1939, Shaw suddenly broke up his band and moved to Mexico. The next day, Glenn Miller called Gray and offered him a job arranging for his band. It was initially a difficult move because Shaw had generally allowed his arrangers great musical latitude, while Miller's commercial orientation often led him to second-guess his staff. Gray gradually found himself more in line with Miller's less–mercurial personality and was allowed more of the freedom that he appreciated. As Gray later told author George T. Simon, "To me, Glenn's band didn't swing like Artie's. ... But after I made up my mind to accept things as they were, things started to click. ... He was a businessman who appreciated music. ... I may have been happier musically with Artie, but I was happier personally with Glenn."

Sgt. Jerry Gray, left, seated, with Maj. Glenn Miller, right, seated, Co-Partner's Hall, Bedford, England, August, 1944

Gray's time with the Glenn Miller Orchestra produced many of the most recognizable and memorable recordings of the era. He arranged "Elmer's Tune", "Moonlight Cocktail", "Perfidia", "Anvil Chorus", and "Chattanooga Choo Choo" among others, while his compositions included "Sun Valley Jump", "The Man in the Moon", "Caribbean Clipper", "Pennsylvania 6-5000", "I Dreamt I Dwelt in Harlem", "Introduction to a Waltz" with Glenn Miller and Harold Dickinson, "Flagwaver", "Solid As a Stonewall Jackson" with Chummy MacGregor, "Oh So Good", "Jeep Jockey Jump", "Keep 'Em Flying", "Passage Interdit", "Snafu Jump", "A Love Song Hasn't Been Sung" with Bill Conway and Harold Dickinson, "Are You Rusty, Gate?", "Here We Go Again", and his most famous song, "A String of Pearls".

Gray was again without a job when Glenn Miller broke up his band in September 1942 to enter the Army of the United States, later transferring to the Army Air Forces. Captain Miller used his connections to have Gray posted in his unit; and in early 1943, Gray rejoined his old boss. Entrenched military bureaucracy halted Miller's initial plans to establish a group of service bands with Gray as coordinator of the arranging staffs. Instead, Army Technical Sergeant (Tech. Sgt.) Gray became chief arranger for the Miller's "Band of the Training Command", which was later known as the Captain (later Major) Glenn Miller Army Air Forces Orchestra.

Tech. Sgt. Gray co-directed the Major Glenn Miller AAF Orchestra with Staff Sergeant (Staff Sgt.) Ray McKinley after Miller's death. Gray was passed over for the job of leading the post-war civilian, "ghost" legacy Glenn Miller Orchestra, reportedly because the Miller Estate felt he did not have the pop-star qualities they wanted in a new leader. That honor went to Ray McKinley who had co-led the military unit with Gray after Miller's death. In 1945, Gray was an arranger for the Tex Beneke-Glenn Miller Orchestra when Henry Mancini was the pianist. In 1947, Gray served as Mancini's best man at his wedding.

Listening to the Gray and Beneke orchestras provides an interesting contrast. Gray was arguably closer in spirit to the Miller legacy but never quite achieved the same level of popularity because he was less of a showman and Decca was no match for RCA's marketing machinery. Beneke benefited from greater name recognition and stage presence but was hampered by restrictions placed on him by the Miller Estate both before and after his split with RCA. Gray continued to tour with his band in various forms through the 1950s. In 1953 he and Henry Mancini worked on The Glenn Miller Story starring James Stewart and June Allyson. In addition to leading his dance band he wrote and arranged for singers such as Vic Damone.

Gray and his Orchestra performed at the twelfth Cavalcade of Jazz held at Wrigley Field in Los Angeles, which was produced by Leon Hefflin, Sr, on September 2, 1956.

== Personal life ==
Jerry Gray married Barbara Ann Denby in 1951. They had a son, Albert Gray, named after Jerry Gray's father, who taught him how to play violin. Later, after a divorce, he married Joan Barton (1925–1977), a vocalist and film actress.

== Filmography ==
- Tough Guys (1986)
- The Glenn Miller Story (1954)
