= Glenn Miller Time =

American TV music series (1961)

Glenn Miller Time is a 1961 summer replacement American television series that aired on Mondays at 10 p.m. on CBS. The series premiered on July 10, 1961 and ended on September 11, 1961.

== Background ==
The series featured the Glenn Miller Orchestra, under the direction of bandleader and drummer Ray McKinley, who was the leader of the post-war Glenn Miller orchestra. McKinley had worked with Miller when they were members of the Dorsey Brothers Orchestra in 1934. They were also both part of the World War II Army Air Force Band which was stationed in the UK in 1944.

Ray McKinley was the co-host with Johnny Desmond in the ten episodes of the series. Singer Patty Clark and the Castle Sisters were regulars on the series, which was targeted at a nostalgic audience which grew up during the big band and swing music era. Johnny Olson was the announcer.

A 30-minute series, approx. 25 minutes minus ads, Glenn Miller Time was sponsored by Kent cigarettes and Jell-O. Glenn Miller Time was the summer replacement for the series Hennesey. It was broadcast live from New York City with Bill Harbach as producer and Robert Scheerer as director.

The columnist Dorothy Kilgallen reported in mid-August, roughly a month into the show's run: "The rating systems checking the CBS-TV show 'Glenn Miller Time' indicate a viewer increase ever since the series was launched in early July, and requests for audience tickets indicate there's still box office magic in the Glenn Miller name." In early September, she wrote: "The Glenn Miller band under Ray McKinley's baton is riding higher than ever because of the popularity of the CBS 'Glenn Miller Time' telecasts. In six one nighters in New England last week, the band played to turn away crowds at every stop and averaged 4,200 paid admission nightly."

The series's theme song was "Moonlight Serenade".

== Critical response ==
A contemporary account called Glenn Miller Time a "pleasing, undemanding musical half hour. Another account said "watching the Miller show is almost enough to renew the faith of TV's loudest critics" and called it a "soothing half hour".

In a review in The New York Times, Jack Gould described the series's premiere episode as "a notably pallid affair" He commented that, although the orchestra used Miller's arrangements, their length had been cut until "they did not carry much distinction". As a result, "musically, it seemed little more than a passing suggestion of the late orchestra leader's handiwork".
