= Tomorrow's Another Day (song) =

- 1935 Decca Records 78 release, 515A

Single by Dorsey Brothers Orchestra
- B-side: "I've Got Your Number"
- Released: January 23, 1935
- Genre: big band
- Length: 2:50
- Label: Decca
- Songwriter: Glenn Miller

"Tomorrow's Another Day" is a 1935 song composed by Glenn Miller for the Dorsey Brothers Orchestra. The song was released as a 78 single by the Dorsey Brothers Orchestra on Decca Records.

== Background ==
Glenn Miller wrote both the music and the lyrics. Glenn Miller copyrighted the song with the U.S. Library of Congress on January 23, 1935. The Dorsey Brothers released the song as an A side 78 single in 1935 on Decca Records, 515A, Matrix # 39346. The B side was "I've Got Your Number" written by Bonnie Lake. The song, arranged by Glenn Miller, was recorded at the Decca Studios on Wednesday, February 6, 1935, in New York City. Kay Weber sang the lead vocals. Glenn Miller was not on the recording session. Glenn Miller's full name appears on the Decca 78 record label under the songwriting credit.

The recording session featured Tommy Dorsey on trombone, Jimmy Dorsey on clarinet, and Ray McKinley on drums.

== Album appearances ==
The recording appeared on the 2010 Hallmark album Bring Back the Good Times by The Dorsey Brothers, the 2013 Cmtk collection All the Great White Jazz Musicians in New York City by the Dorsey Brothers Orchestra, the 2005 collection The Dorsey Brothers on The Sky's The Limit, and the 2013 collection The Dorsey Brothers: New York Jazz Orchestra on Underground Inside Records.

== Sources ==
- Deffaa, Chip. (1992). In the Mainstream: 18 Portraits in Jazz. Metuchen, NJ: Scarecrow Press, p. 98.
- Flower, John (1972). Moonlight Serenade: a bio-discography of the Glenn Miller Civilian Band. New Rochelle, NY: Arlington House. ISBN 0-87000-161-2.
- Miller, Glenn (1943). Glenn Miller's Method for Orchestral Arranging. New York: Mutual Music Society. ASIN B0007DMEDQ
- Simon, George Thomas (1980). Glenn Miller and His Orchestra. New York: Da Capo paperback. ISBN 0-306-80129-9.
- Simon, George Thomas (1971). Simon Says. New York: Galahad. ISBN 0-88365-001-0.
- Schuller, Gunther (1991). The Swing Era: The Development of Jazz, 1930–1945, Vol. 2. New York: Oxford University Press. ISBN 0-19-507140-9.
- Sudhalter, Richard (1999). Lost Chords. New York: Oxford University Press. ISBN 0-19-514838-X
