= Johnny Desmond =

American pop singer (1919–1985)

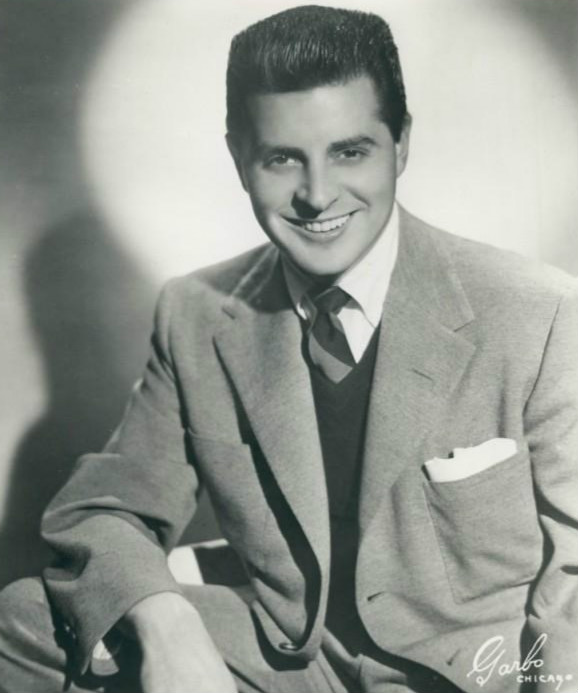
- Desmond in 1953

Background information
- Born: Giovanni Alfredo De Simone; November 14, 1919; Detroit, Michigan, U.S.
- Died: September 6, 1985 (aged 65) Los Angeles, California, U.S.
- Genres: Traditional pop
- Occupation: Singer
- Years active: 1939–1972
- Labels: Decca, Okeh, Columbia, RCA Victor, MGM, Coral

Johnny Desmond (born Giovanni Alfredo De Simone; November 14, 1919 – September 6, 1985) was an American singer who was popular in the 1940s, 1950s and 1960s.

== Biography ==
=== Early years ===
Desmond was born Giovanni de Simone in Detroit, Michigan. He began singing in the St. Joseph's parish choir when he was 11 years old. As a boy he also sang on a local radio station, but at age 15 he quit to work at his father's grocery. He attended Northwestern High School. He retained a love of music, and briefly attended the Detroit Conservatory of Music before heading to the nightclub circuit, playing piano and singing.

In 1939, he formed his own singing group. The group was first called the Downbeats. After being hired to work with Bob Crosby's big band in 1940, it was renamed the Bob-O-Links. The group appeared on 15 commercial recordings by the Crosby orchestra, including two charted hits, "You Forgot About Me" (which reached No. 15), and "Do You Care?" (No. 18).

=== War years ===
In the middle of 1941, Desmond decided to leave the Bob-O-Links to go solo. He became the featured vocalist for Gene Krupa's band, replacing Howard Dulaney, in September, recording over a dozen songs, the last of which was "All Those Wonderful Years", a song from the movie Keep 'em Flying, which reached No. 21 on the US chart.

In 1942, he enlisted in the United States Army, but his military service was in fact a continuation of his singing career. He was a member of Glenn Miller's Army Air Forces Orchestra and replaced singer Tony Martin after he joined the US Navy, from November 1943 until July 28, 1945, when the band was shipped home. He and the band played troop and air bases in England, and eventually went to France in December 1944. He made a number of radio broadcasts with the Miller band, and was given his own show called "A Soldier and a Song." on the American Forces Network (and sometimes on BBC Radio). His discharge took place on November 23, 1945.

=== Postwar era ===
Immediately after his discharge, Desmond became the singer and master of ceremonies on the Teentimers Club, a Saturday morning program on NBC radio.

After the war he took a job on The Breakfast Club, a radio variety program in Chicago, Illinois. He made a number of charted hit recordings: "Don't You Remember Me?" (recorded 1946, reaching No. 21 on the charts), "Guilty" (recorded December 6, 1946, reaching No. 12), "C'est si bon" (recorded May 11, 1949, reaching No. 25), "Don't Cry, Joe" (recorded May 21, 1949, reaching No. 22), "Just Say I Love Her" (recorded January 20, 1950, reaching No. 24), "The Picnic Song" (recorded April 1, 1950, reaching No. 20), "Because of You" (recorded February 10, 1951, reaching No. 17), and "Woman" (recorded September 15, 1953, reaching No. 9). On September 24, 1953, he joined with Don Cornell and Alan Dale to record "(The Gang that Sang) Heart of My Heart," a No. 10 hit on the chart. During this time he switched recording companies frequently. The 1946 recordings were made for RCA Victor, the 1949-51 recordings for MGM, and the 1953 recordings for Coral Records.

In the 1940s and 1950s, many artists would record the same song at about the same time, and some chart hits for Desmond were also major hits for other singers. Thus "Guilty" (No. 12 for Desmond) was an even bigger hit for Margaret Whiting, with a No. 4 position. "Because of You" (No. 17 for Desmond) was a No. 1 hit for Tony Bennett. "The High and the Mighty" (No. 17 for Desmond) was No. 4 for Les Baxter and his Orchestra. The Desmond/Dale/Cornell version of "Heart of My Heart" reached No. 10, but the Four Aces' version peaked at No. 7 on the chart. In some cases, Desmond's version was the biggest hit. Teresa Brewer also recorded "The Picnic Song" but her version did not chart. "Woman" was recorded by José Ferrer (back to back with a recording of "Man" by his wife, Rosemary Clooney), but Desmond's was the bigger version in the US (though the UK Singles Chart favored the Ferrer recording). Desmond also recorded several versions of songs that did not chart but became hits for other singers: for example, "Mister and Mississippi" (a hit for Patti Page) and "Too Young" (a hit for Nat King Cole).

Desmond was a guest on the early television series, Faye Emerson's Wonderful Town, which aired on CBS from 1951 to 1952. In 1957, Desmond joined Boris Karloff in a guest appearance on NBC's The Gisele MacKenzie Show.

A pair of 1957 films from Columbia Pictures cast Desmond in starring roles, the musical Calypso Heat Wave and the crime drama Escape from San Quentin, as did a 1958 adventure film, Desert Hell.

In 1961, Desmond co-starred on the CBS summer replacement series Glenn Miller Time, which featured the Miller orchestra under the direction of host Ray McKinley.

=== Later years ===
On Broadway, Desmond appeared in Say, Darling (1958) and as Nick Arnstein in Funny Girl, after Sydney Chaplin left the cast.

=== Personal life and death ===
Desmond married singer Ruth Keddington.

In September 1985, he died of cancer at Cedars-Sinai Medical Center in Los Angeles, California, at the age of 65.

== Singles ==
Year	Titles (A-side, B-side) Both sides from same album except where indicated	Chart positions		Album
Year	Titles (A-side, B-side) Both sides from same album except where indicated	US	CB	Album
1946	"Don't You Remember Me" b/w "In the Eyes of My Irish Colleen"	21		Non-album tracks
1947	"Guilty" b/w "I'll Close My Eyes"	12		Non-album tracks
1949	"Don't Cry, Joe (Let Her Go, Let Her Go, Let Her Go)" b/w "The Last Mile Home (Is the Longest Mile)"	22		Non-album tracks
1950	"C'est si bon" b/w "If You Could Care"	25		Non-album tracks
1950	"The Picnic Song" b/w "I've Got a Heart Filled with Love (For You Dear)"	20		Non-album tracks
1950	"Just Say I Love Her" b/w "If Anybody Does"	24		Non-album tracks
1950	"A Bushel and a Peck" b/w "So Long Sally"	29		Non-album tracks
1951	"Because of You" b/w "Andiamo"	17		Non-album tracks
1951	"I Want to Be Near You" b/w "I Will Never Change"	30		Non-album tracks
All of the above charted tracks were released on 78 only
1952	"Oh My Darlin'" b/w "Until" (Non-album track)			Desmo Sings Desmond
1952	"Festival" b/w "Confetti, I Stood and Threw"			Non-album tracks
1952	"Battle Hymn of the Republic" b/w "How Much Will I Miss You" (from Desmo Sings Desmond)			Non-album tracks
1952	"One Way Heart" b/w It's Meant to Be That Way"			Non-album tracks
1952	"Nina Never Knew" /	19		Non-album tracks
1952	"Stay Where You Are"	26	31	Non-album tracks
1952	"Christmas in the Air" b/w "Christmas Is a Time"			Non-album tracks
1953	"Trying" b/w "Wild Guitar"	23		Non-album tracks
1953	"Gay Caballero" b/w "Thanks for Letting Me Know"			Non-album tracks
1953	"The Japanese Sandman" b/w "Danger" (Non-album track)			Johnny Desmond
1953	"It's So Nice to Be Your Neighbor" b/w "I'm a Love You"			Non-album tracks
1953	"Woman" b/w "The River Seine"	9	6	Non-album tracks
1953	"The Gang That Sang 'Heart of My Heart'" b/w "I Think I'll Fall in Love Today"; Both sides with Don Cornell & Alan Dale	10	5	Non-album tracks
1954	"Pine Tree, Pine Over Me" (with Eileen Barton & The McGuire Sisters) /	26	27	Non-album tracks
1954	"Cling to Me" (with Eileen Barton & The McGuire Sisters)		49	Non-album tracks
1954	"East Side, West Side" b/w "Sweet Augustine"; Both sides with Don Cornell, Alan Dale and Buddy Greco	28		Non-album tracks
1954	"The Zoo" b/w "Would You Let Me Hold Your Heart"		45	Non-album tracks
1954	"Backward, Turn Backward" b/w "Forever Love"; Both sides with Jane Russell			Non-album tracks
1954	"The High and the Mighty"; Original B-side: "In God We Trust" (Non-album track); Later B-side: "Got No Time" (Non-album track)	17	4	Play Me Hearts and Flowers (10-inch LP)
1954	"Brooklyn Bridge" b/w "Here I Go Walkin' Down the Road"			Non-album tracks
1954	"Don't" b/w "There's No Happiness for Me"; Both sides with Alan Dale and Buddy Greco			Non-album tracks
1954	"The Song from Desiree" /		17	Play Me Hearts and Flowers (10-inch LP)
1954	"My Own True Love"	23	31	Play Me Hearts and Flowers (10-inch LP)
1955	"Play Me Hearts and Flowers (I Wanna Cry)" b/w "I'm So Ashamed"	6	10	Play Me Hearts and Flowers (10-inch LP)
1955	"Togetherness" b/w "A Straw Hat and a Cane"			Non-album tracks
1955	"It's a Sin to Tell a Lie" b/w "Learnin' the Blues" (from Johnny Desmond)			Non-album tracks
1955	"Land of the Pharaohs" b/w "This Too Shall Pass"			Non-album tracks
1955	"The Yellow Rose of Texas" b/w "You're in Love with Someone" (Non-album track)	3	1	Johnny Desmond
1955	"Your Future" b/w "I'm So Glad"			Non-album tracks
1955	"Miss America!" b/w "Gentlemen Marry Brunettes"			Non-album tracks
1955	"Sixteen Tons" b/w "Ballo Italiano" (Non-album track)	17		Johnny Desmond
1955	"Santo Natale" b/w "Happy Holidays to You"			Non-album tracks
1956	"I'll Cry Tomorrow" b/w "In My Diary"			Non-album tracks
1956	"Never Again" b/w "Now Is the Time"			Non-album tracks
1956	"The Most Happy Fella" b/w "Without You"			Non-album tracks
1956	"A Little Love Can Go a Long, Long Way" b/w "Please Don't Forget Me Dear" (from Desmo Sings Desmond)			Non-album tracks
1956	"I Only Know I Love You" b/w "The Proud Ones" (Non-album track)			Souvenir d'Italie
1956	"A Girl Called Mary" b/w "Bueno"			Non-album tracks
1956	"Old Fashioned Christmas" b/w "Birthday Party of the King"			Non-album tracks
1957	"18th Century Music Box" b/w "Down Where the River Meets the Sea"			Non-album tracks
1957	"I Just Want You to Want Me" b/w "That's Where I Shine" (from Johnny Desmond)			Non-album tracks
1957	"A White Sport Coat (And a Pink Carnation)" b/w "Just Lookin'"	62		Non-album tracks
1957	"Shenandoah Rose" b/w "Consideration" (from Johnny Desmond Goes Calypso!)			Non-album tracks
1957	"Be Patient with Me" b/w "Missing"			Non-album tracks
1957	"Rich Man, Poor Man" b/w "I Would Love You Still"			Non-album tracks
1957	"Keep Me in Mind" b/w "Lonely Lament"			Non-album tracks
1958	"Farewell to Naples" b/w "Temperamental You"			Non-album tracks
1958	"The Sands of Time" b/w "The Jealous Boy Friend"			Non-album tracks
1958	"Anniversary Song" b/w "First, Last and Always"			Non-album tracks
1958	"I'll Close My Eyes" b/w "Hot Cha Cha"			Non-album tracks
1958	"C'est Si Bon Cha Cha" b/w "Black Haired Beauty"			Non-album tracks
1958	"Apple (When Ya Gonna Fall from the Tree)" b/w "Willingly"			Non-album tracks
1959	"Goodbye My Love, Goodbye" b/w "Bye-Bye Barbara"			Non-album tracks
1959	"Hey Little Dolly" b/w "Dancin' Man"			Non-album tracks
1959	"Maria" b/w "Please"			Non-album tracks
1960	"I Never Meant to Fall in Love" b/w "Eighth Wonder of the World"			Non-album tracks
1960	"Hawk" b/w "Playing The Field"			Non-album tracks
1960	"Lover Come Back to Me" b/w "No One Ever Tells You"			Non-album tracks
1962	"Twistin' Rose of Texas" b/w "Hello Honey"			Non-album tracks
1964	"Rio Conchos" b/w "Fate Is the Hunter"			Non-album tracks
1966	"My Melancholy Baby" b/w "The Common Touch"			Non-album tracks
1966	"The Last of the Big Time Losers" b/w "I Want to Believe You"			Non-album tracks
1970	"Red Lips" b/w "Didn't We"			Non-album tracks
1970	"Red Red Roses" b/w "You're the Girl I've Always Wanted"			Non-album tracks
1971	"Absence Makes the Heart Grow Fonder"; B-side unrelated			Non-album tracks
1973	"Untouchable" b/w "Red Lips"			Non-album tracks
