= Harlem Chapel Chimes =

1935 jazz instrumental by Glenn Miller

1935 UK 78 release as Brunswick 02149-A by the Dorsey Brothers Orchestra.

British Decca 78 release.

"Harlem Chapel Chimes" is a 1935 jazz instrumental composed by Glenn Miller. The song was released as an A-side 78 single by the Dorsey Brothers Orchestra.

== Background ==
The song was recorded by the Dorsey Brothers Orchestra on February 6, 1935, in New York and released as a 78 single. The song was copyrighted by the music publisher Campbell and Connelly and Company, Ltd., in the UK. Two versions were released: 39337-A was released on British Brunswick Records in the UK as 02149 backed with "Weary Blues", while 39337-C was released on British Decca Records in Belgium as BM-02149, the American Series. Jimmy Dorsey played clarinet. Tommy Dorsey played trombone on the track. Miller was not on the studio recording session. The arrangement was by Glenn Miller. The instrumental featured a clarinet solo by Jimmy Dorsey with chimes at the beginning and end of the song.

The personnel on the recording: George Thow, Charlie Spivak, trumpet, Tommy Dorsey, Joe Yukl, trombone, Don Mattison, tb, Jimmy Dorsey, clarinet, alto sax, Jack Stacey, alto sax, Skeets Herfurt, tenor sax, Bobby van Eps, piano, Roc Hillman, guitar, Delmar Kaplan, bass, and Ray McKinley, drums.

The Brunswick 78 release was reviewed in the British music magazine, Musical News: Dance Music and Those Who Make It, the May, 1936 issue. Ray McKinley's drumming was highlighted:

I am no particular Dorsey fan, except perhaps for brother Tom's trombone playing, but by hook or by crook you must hear the drumming on both sides of the above. Apart from the actual beats, there is the most seductive, mushy sound, obtained goodness knows how. That is really the only thing I have to say. The band has polish and restraint, but they play the wrong kind of music.

Don't forget them drums.

This instrumental is not to be confused with "Harlem Chapel Bells" which was composed by Glenn Miller orchestra trumpeter Billy May and performed by the band on April 2, 1941, on the Chesterfield radio program.

The instrumental was featured on a Big Band Show program on Glenn Miller which was broadcast on Radio Clyde on 15 December 1981 hosted by Ken Sykora, playing recordings of Glenn Miller as a member of other bands, as a soloist, and rare radio performances. He mistakenly claimed that Glenn Miller played trombone on the track. He had left the band when the instrumental was recorded in 1935.

== Album appearances ==
The recording does not appear on any compilation albums.
