= Dese Dem Dose =

1935 composition by Glenn Miller

1935 Decca 78, 469B.

Dese Dem Dose is a 1935 instrumental composed by Glenn Miller and recorded by The Dorsey Brothers orchestra.

Dese Dem Dose was recorded in New York on February 6, 1935, and was released as a 78 by The Dorsey Brothers on Decca paired with "Weary Blues" as Decca 469B. Ray McKinley, the drummer in the Dorsey Brothers band, recalled: "Glenn did write a few things for us. I remember one thing called 'Dese, Dem and Dose' that he wrote and we recorded. He used to carry a little organ around with him to work on." The recording was released on the 1950 Decca LP Dixieland Jazz, 1934-1935, Volume 1 by the Dorsey Brothers' Orchestra, DL 6016, as an album of 78s as A-689, and as an album of 45s as 9-255, the 1999 Avid compilation The Dorsey Brothers, the 2010 Hallmark album Bring Back The Good Times, the 2006 album Essential Collection on West End Records, the Circle collection The Dorsey Brothers Orchestra, 1935, and the 2010 Hallmark collection The Fabulous Dorseys Play Dixieland Jazz.

== Other recordings ==
Ray Noble and his American Dance Orchestra performed "Dese Dem Dose" as part of a medley, "Dese Dem Dose/An Hour Ago This Minute/Solitude", on April 17, 1935 live at the Rainbow Room in New York which was recorded and broadcast and released in 2008 on the live CD by Galaxy Music, The Rainbow Room New York Presents Ray Noble & His American Dance Orchestra: Original Live-Recordings 1935 and the 2011 album The Very Best Of Ray Noble & His American Dance Orchestra on Platinum Collection. The radio announcer introduced the performance as follows: "'Dese, Dem, and Dose'. Hot and fast but still with that underlying note of sophistication that distinguishes Ray Noble's music." Glenn Miller was in the Ray Noble orchestra at the time on trombone and had organized and rehearsed the band. Glenn Miller also appeared with the Ray Noble Orchestra that year in the Hollywood movie musical The Big Broadcast of 1936 (1935). Ray Noble paid Glenn Miller "for working on The Big Broadcast of 1936, so that Glenn's total weekly pay ranged from a one-week low of $130 to a one-week high of $356."

Jazz trumpeter Billy Butterfield and Andy Bartha performed "Dese Dem Dose" in the early 1970s, a performance which was released on the 2005 live album Take Me to the Land of Jazz. "Dese Dem Dose" was released in 2008 by the Colorado jazz band The Jazz Cookers on their album Live At Brix.

== Personnel ==
The Dorsey Brothers' Orchestra consisted of the following members in 1934-1935: Ray McKinley on drums; Skeets Herfurt on tenor sax; Delmar Kaplan on bass; Bobby Van Epps on piano; Roc Hillman on guitar; Don Mattison on trombone; Kay Weber on vocals; Jack Stacey on alto sax; George Thow on trumpet; Tommy Dorsey on trombone; Jimmy Dorsey on alto sax; and, Glenn Miller on trombone. Glenn Miller was also an arranger in the band. Charlie Spivak and Bob Crosby were also members during this period.

== Sources ==
- Simon, George Thomas. Glenn Miller and His Orchestra. NY: Crowell, 1974.
- The Dorsey Brothers. Discography. Red Hot Jazz website.
- Levinson, Peter J. Tommy Dorsey: Living In A Great Big Way. Da Capo Press, 2005.
- Sanford, Herb. Tommy & Jimmy; The Dorsey Years. Arlington House, 1972.
- Korall, Burt. Drummin' Men: The Heartbeat of Jazz. The Swing Years. Oxford University Press, 1990, p. 100.
