= Glenn Miller's Method for Orchestral Arranging =

1943 book on arranging by Glenn Miller

1943 first edition, Mutual Music Society, New York.

Glenn Miller's Method for Orchestral Arranging is a 1943 book on arranging by Glenn Miller published by the Mutual Music Society in the U.S. and Chappell & Co., Ltd., in the UK.

== Background ==
The book was published in New York by the Mutual Music Society on May 28, 1943, consisting of 116 pages. The book was wrapped in dark red cloth with two stapled, folded multiple page scores, with the title in a gold color. The two songs featured were "The Song of the Volga Boatmen" in six pages and "I'm Thrilled" in five pages, which had been released as 78 singles by Glenn Miller and his Orchestra on RCA Victor. Glenn Miller described the process of making orchestral arrangements with many examples from his own orchestra. There were chapters on "Making a smooth arrangement", "Making a rhythmic arrangement", and "Orchestral effects".

The book was also published in a similar UK edition in 1943 by Chappell & Co., Ltd., 50 New Bond Street, in London, W.I, printed by Lowe and Brydone.

The book was influential on later jazz arrangers. Grammy Award winning arranger Bob Freedman used the book to develop his own arranging techniques.

James Stewart was shown reading the book in a 1953 Universal Pictures promotional photograph for the film The Glenn Miller Story.

== Sources ==
- Flower, John (1972). Moonlight Serenade: a bio-discography of the Glenn Miller Civilian Band. New Rochelle, NY: Arlington House. ISBN 0-87000-161-2.
- Miller, Glenn (1943). Glenn Miller's Method for Orchestral Arranging. New York: Mutual Music Society. ASIN: B0007DMEDQ
- Simon, George Thomas (1980). Glenn Miller and His Orchestra. New York: Da Capo paperback. ISBN 0-306-80129-9.
- Simon, George Thomas (1971). Simon Says. New York: Galahad. ISBN 0-88365-001-0.
- Schuller, Gunther (1991). The Swing Era: The Development of Jazz, 1930–1945, Vol. 2. New York: Oxford University Press. ISBN 0-19-507140-9.
- Sudhalter, Richard (1999). Lost Chords. New York: Oxford University Press. ISBN 0-19-514838-X
