= Glenn Miller Orchestra (1956–present) =

American jazz ensemble named after Glenn Miller and his band

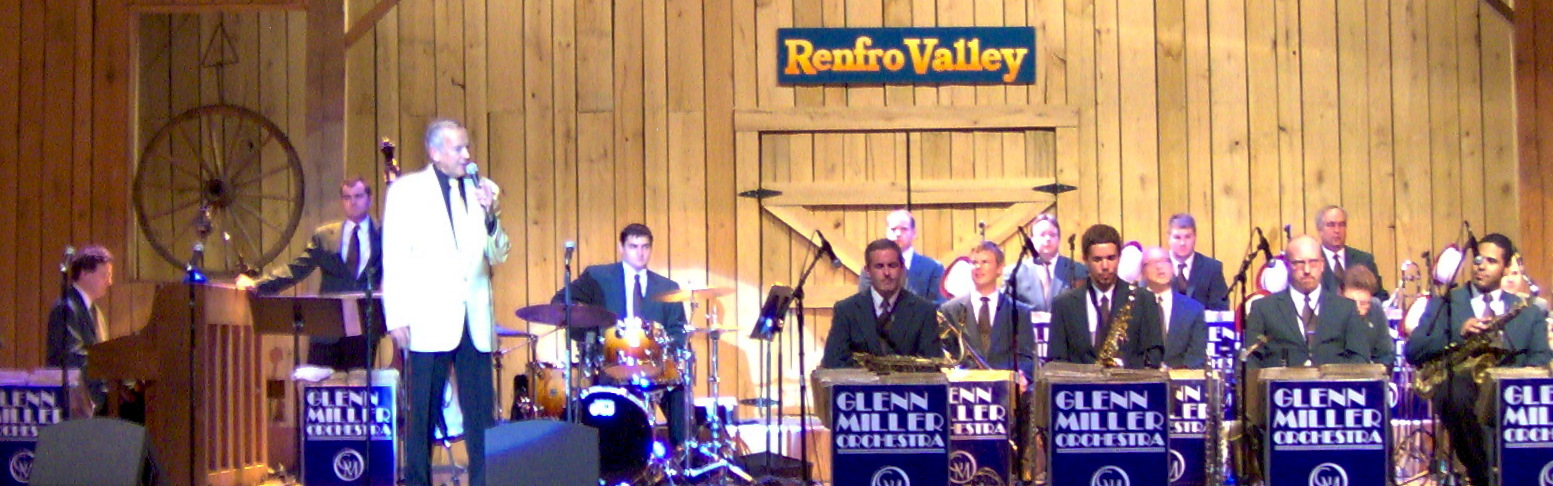
- The Glenn Miller Orchestra, 2009.

Background information
- Genres: Jazz, Big band
- Years active: 1956–present
- Members: Erik Stabnau, Jenny Swoish, Kevin Sheehan, Gary Meggs, Connor Baba, Ashley Hall, Chris Stein, Matt Gates, Joe Young IV, George Reinert III, Dave Ashley, Mike DeSousa, Byron McChord, Dean Schweiger
- Past members: Don New, Dan Riley, Tex Beneke, Ray McKinley, Lenny Hambro, Peanuts Hucko, Dick Lowenthal, Buddy Morrow, Jimmy Henderson, Dick Gerhart, Henry Mancini, Larry O'Brien, Chris Fortner, Derek Kwong, Lee Taylor, Walt Kross, Jeff Spurlock, Joe Rose, Bill Kotrba, Tim Pence, Cary Sheley, Steve Bleifuss, Andrew Burdick, David Bobroff, Terry Frenz II, Steve Molloy, Mike Manthey, Graham Breedlove, Jeff Wilfore, Alex Norris, Joe Weber, Rudy Petschauer, Jeremy Manasia, Tom McDonough, Tim Albright, Gary Tole, Clifford Shibly, Jack Sperling, Beat Kaestli, Dale Orris, Nick Hilscher, Bill Barbour, Dave Ryan, Robbie Hioki, Doug Cook, Barry Springer, Bill Barrett, Mike Duva, Julia Rich (vocal), Charlie Lee, Jeff Hughes, Roscoe Myers, Wally Besser, Darrell Hendricks, Larry Newman, Steve McCallum, Clayton Lucovich, Holbrook Riles III, Joel Linscheid, Jon Rees, Tom Smith, Jonathan McQuade, Nigel Yancey, Dylan Schwab, Patrick Hession, Seth Lewis, Shawn Williams, James Navan, Buck Clayton, Dominic "Nick" Barulli, Elliot Scozzaro, Karl Stabnau, Allen Cordingley, Abdullah Ebrahim, Hayden Mapel, Ron Mills, Patrick Sheehan, Louie Leager, Gil Scott Chapman, Dan Gabel, Brad Black, Dave O'Fallon, Natalie Angst (vocal), Ron Coulter (drums). Ray Anthony
- Website: www.glennmillerorchestra.com

The Glenn Miller Orchestra is an American big band formed in 1956 as a revival of the historic Glenn Miller Orchestras of the 1930s and 1940s.

== History ==
The original Glenn Miller Orchestra operated from 1937 until 1942, when Miller joined the Army Air Forces and launched the Major Glenn Miller Army Air Forces Orchestra. Miller disappeared December 15, 1944, presumed dead in a flight over the English Channel, never to be found.

=== 1946 to 1950 ===
In 1946, Miller's widow authorized a new band to be formed under the name Glenn Miller Orchestra, led by Miller's saxophonist and vocalist Tex Beneke.

Many members of Miller's Army Air Forces Orchestra joined the band, which until 1948 featured a large string section as had Miller's Army Air Forces band (but unlike the original Glenn Miller Orchestra). The band was successful, but Beneke didn't like having to follow Miller's old arrangements precisely. The Miller estate wanted a band that was primarily associated with Glenn Miller, playing the Glenn Miller songs in the "Glenn Miller style." By 1950, Beneke and the Miller estate parted ways and the band dissolved. Beneke formed his own band, "Tex Beneke and His Orchestra: Playing the Music Made Famous by Glenn Miller"

=== 1956 to present ===
There was a second revival of the name Glenn Miller Orchestra in 1956, which has continued well into the 21st century. It is this version with which this article is primarily concerned.

After the release of the successful film The Glenn Miller Story, Miller's widow invited Ray McKinley, who had assumed leadership of the Major Glenn Miller Army Air Forces Orchestra in 1945, to lead a new Glenn Miller Orchestra. McKinley remained with the Miller band until 1966.

The Glenn Miller Orchestra has recorded and performed under various leaders, from 1956 to this day. Clarinetist Buddy DeFranco became the musical director in 1966.

Larry O'Brien served as director of the World-Famous Glenn Miller Orchestra from 1981 to 1983 and from 1988 to 2010.

Singer Nick Hilscher became the director of the touring band in 2012, replacing previous director Gary Tole. Saxophonist/vocalist Erik Stabnau became music director in August 2021.

The Glenn Miller estate has authorized other bands to perform as "The Glenn Miller Orchestra" internationally. These groups are based in England, Europe, and Scandinavia.

== Members of the American band ==
Current as of 2022

- Erik Stabnau – Music Director / Vocalist / Tenor Saxophone
- Jenny Swoish – Female Vocalist
- Kevin Sheehan – Lead Alto Saxophone, Clarinet, Flute, Arranger
- Gary Meggs – 2nd Alto Saxophone, Clarinet
- Allen Cordingley – Tenor Saxophone 1, Clarinet, Flute
- Justin Williams – Tenor Saxophone 2, Clarinet, flute
- Noah Barrios – Baritone Saxophone, Alto Saxophone, Bass Clarinet, Flute
- Ashley Hall – Lead Trumpet
- Matthew Gates – Split Lead /2nd Trumpet
- Joe Young IV – Jazz/3rd Trumpet
- George Reinert III – Lead Trombone
- Dave Ashley – 2nd Trombone
- Jason Bennett – 3rd Trombone
- Gil Scott Chapman – Piano/Sound Tech
- Dean Schweiger – Drums
- Charlie Himel – Upright Bass

== Discography ==
=== Albums ===
- 1983: In the Digital Mood
- 1991: In the Christmas Mood
- 1993: In the Christmas Mood II

== See also ==
- The Airmen of Note
