= Annie's Cousin Fannie =

1934 song by Glenn Miller

1934 Brunswick 78, 6938, "Annie's Cousin Fannie is a Sweetie of Mine".

1934 Decca 78, 117A, "Annie's Cousin Fannie".

Annie's Cousin Fannie, which is sometimes listed as "Annie's Cousin Fanny", is a 1934 song composed by Glenn Miller and recorded by The Dorsey Brothers Orchestra for Brunswick and Decca Records. The Dorsey Brothers released two versions of the song in 1934 and 1935.

== Recording History ==
Annie's Cousin Fannie, also released as "Annie's Cousin Fannie is a Sweetie of Mine", was written for the Dorsey Brothers Band in 1934 by Glenn Miller, who was an arranger and trombonist in the band. The composition featured double entendre lyrics.

The song was recorded four times, first on May 21, 1934, in New York. The June 4, 1934, recording was released under the title "Annie's Cousin Fannie is a Sweetie of Mine" on Brunswick as 6938 b/w "Judy". Glenn Miller's name was misspelled on the 78 record label as "Glen". Take 2 was recorded on August 15, 1934, in New York for Decca. Take 3 was recorded on August 23, 1934, and was released in a second version of the song under the title "Annie's Cousin Fannie" on Decca as the A side to the Decca 117 78 that featured "Dr. Heckle and Mr. Jibe" as the B side. The lyrics were sung by Kay Weber, one of the first female singers of the Big Band Era, and Glenn Miller, who had discovered her.

The song was reportedly banned by some radio stations because of the risque double entendre lyrics and stirred controversy. John McClelland wrote in The Stanford Daily that there was a controversy regarding the appearance of the Dorsey band at a campus concert because Kay Weber would "sing the wrong kind of songs". He invoked "blue laws" that were used to argue against the performance of the song "Annie's Cousin Fanny" by the band because it was deemed "shady".

Tommy Dorsey sang the first verse, then Don Matteson, and finally Glenn Miller sang the last verse. Skeets Herfurt and Kay Weber are also on vocals. The recording was produced by David Lennick.

The 1934 Brunswick recording appears on the 1992 Sony compilation Best of Big Bands: Dorsey Brothers, The Dorsey Brothers: Stop, Look & Listen, Original 1932-1932 Recordings, 2005, Naxos Jazz Legends, and on the 2004 collection by Avid The Glenn Miller Story, Vols. 1-2. The song is also on the 2006 compilation The Dorsey Brothers, Vol. 4 on Jazz Oracle and the 2006 various artists collection Beat the Band to the Bar on ASV Living Era. The song also appeared on the 1969 various artists compilation vinyl LP Screwballs of Swingtime on Bandstand Records as BS7106 in the U.S.

== Other Recordings ==
The song was recorded by Dick Pierce, Russ Carlton and his Orchestra on Carlton Records as a 78 single, C-1000, by Marshall Royal and Maxwell Davis on the album Studio Cuts featuring two takes released on Tuff City, which features two takes of the song. In 1988, The Inspot Swingband recorded the song with an accompanying video. In 2000, Mora's Modern Rhythmists Dance Orchestra, a ten-piece ensemble that plays jazz and swing from the 1920s and 1930s, recorded a version which they released on the Mr. Ace album Call of the Freaks.

There was also a follow-up song entitled "Since Annie's Cousin Fanny Married Heinie" by Sammy Cahn and Saul Chaplin which was copyrighted on January 9, 1937, and published by Leeds Music Company in New York.

== Personnel ==
The members of the Dorsey Brothers' Orchestra in 1934 included: Ray McKinley on drums; Skeets Herfurt on tenor sax; Delmar Kaplan on bass; Bobby Van Epps on piano; Roc Hillman on guitar; Don Matteson on trombone; Kay Weber on vocals; Jack Stacey on alto sax; George Thow on trumpet; Tommy Dorsey on trombone; Jimmy Dorsey on sax; and, Glenn Miller on trombone. Glenn Miller was also an arranger in the band. Charlie Spivak and Bob Crosby were also members of the band at various times. The band broke up in late 1935.

== Sources ==
- Simon, George Thomas. Glenn Miller and His Orchestra. NY: Crowell, 1974.
- Levinson, Peter J. Tommy Dorsey: Livin' in a Great Big Way: a Biography. Cambridge, Massachusetts: Da Capo Press, 2005. ISBN 978-0-306-81111-1
- Stockdale, Robert L. Tommy Dorsey: On The Side. Metuchen, NJ: The Scarecrow Press, 1995. ISBN 978-0-8108-2951-0
- Stockdale, Robert L. Jimmy Dorsey: A Study in Contrasts. (Studies in Jazz Series). Lanham, MD: The Scarecrow Press, Inc., 1999.
- Arnold, Jay, ed. Jimmy Dorsey Saxophone Method: A School of Rhythmic Saxophone Playing. Warner Bros Pubns, 1999.
- Sanford, Herb. Tommy and Jimmy: The Dorsey Years. (Introduction by Bing Crosby). DaCapo Press, 1980.
- Jazz Connection Magazine, October, 2005, Stephen Fratallone, "Remembering Kay Weber Sillaway".
