= The Dorsey Brothers =

American jazz band (1928–1935)

- Dorsey Brothers Orchestra, 1934. Bottom (L-R): George Thow, Roc Hillman, Don "Matty" Matteson, Skeets Herfurt, Ray McKinley; Standing (L-R): Bobby Van Epps, Delmar Kaplan, Tommy Dorsey, Kay Weber, Jimmy Dorsey, Glenn Miller, Jack Stacey

Background information
- Origin: New York City, New York, U.S.
- Genres: Jazz
- Years active: 1928–1935
- Labels: OKeh; Melotone; Columbia; Brunswick; Decca

The Dorsey Brothers were an American studio dance band, led by Tommy and Jimmy Dorsey. They started recording in 1928 for OKeh Records.

== History ==
The Dorsey Brothers recorded songs for the dime store labels (Banner, Cameo, Domino, Jewel, Oriole, Perfect). A handful of sides during their Brunswick period were issued by Vocalion.

They signed to Decca in 1934, formed a touring band, with Tommy as front man, and a rather unusual lineup of one trumpet, three trombones, three saxes and four rhythm. The band performed live mainly in the New England area, with acrimony between the brothers steadily building up, until a definitive falling out between Tommy and Jimmy over the tempo of "I'll Never Say Never Again Again" in May 1935, after which Tommy walked off the stage. Glenn Miller composed four songs for the Dorsey Brothers when he was a member in 1934 and 1935, "Annie's Cousin Fannie", on which both Tommy and Glenn share the rather racy vocal, "Dese Dem Dose", "Harlem Chapel Chimes", and "Tomorrow's Another Day". Miller left in late 1934 to take up the job as Ray Noble's musical director and arranger.

In 1935, the Dorsey Brothers Orchestra had two No. 1 recordings on Decca, including "Lullaby of Broadway" with Bob Crosby on vocals, topping the charts for two weeks and No. 1 for three weeks.

Tommy Dorsey permanently left the orchestra in 1935 to take over the Joe Haymes band, turning it into Tommy Dorsey and his Orchestra, with the nucleus of the Dorsey Brothers' Orchestra carrying on under Jimmy's leadership. Tommy's chair was filled by the 16-year-old Bobby Byrne. The Dorseys reunited on March 15, 1945, to record a V-Disc at Liederkranz Hall in New York City. Released in June 1945, the disc contained "More Than You Know" and "Brotherly Jump". The songs were performed by the combined orchestras of Jimmy and Tommy Dorsey. They reunited again in 1947 for the film The Fabulous Dorseys. In 1950, Jimmy disbanded his orchestra and joined Tommy's band on a permanent basis. On May 23, 1953, the combined orchestra made its television debut on the Jackie Gleason Show. Starting in 1954, they had a network TV series, Stage Show produced by Jackie Gleason. Elvis Presley made his national television debut on their show in 1956. Charlie Parker, who as a fledgling alto sax player expressed an admiration for Jimmy, died in front of the TV while watching a Dorsey Brothers' show. When in November 1956 Tommy died in his sleep from choking on his own vomit, Jimmy, already desperately ill, carried on for some months with Tommy's silent trombone displayed on stage, until in June 1957 he succumbed to throat cancer.

Jimmy and Tommy appeared as the Mystery Guests on the October 16, 1955 airing of What's My Line?. They were guessed by Dorothy Kilgallen.

In 1996, the U.S. Postal Service issued a commemorative postage stamp in honor of Jimmy Dorsey and Tommy Dorsey.

Roc Hillman was the last surviving member of the band, dying in 2011 just a month and a half before his 101st birthday.

Dorsey Brothers Orchestra in the studio, 1934: Pictured are (Back row, l-r): Don "Matty" Matteson, trombone; Ray McKinley, drums; George Thow, trumpet; Glenn Miller, trombone; Bobby Van Epps, piano. (Middle row, l-r): Skeets Herfurt, tenor sax; Jack Stacey, tenor sax; Jimmy Dorsey, alto sax; Delmar Kaplan, bass; Roc Hillman, guitar; Tommy Dorsey, trombone. Seated in front are band vocalists Bob Crosby and Kay Weber.

== Songs ==
- "Coquette", 1928
- "Dixie Dawn", 1928
- "Let's Do It (Let's Fall in Love)", (vocal by Bing Crosby), 1929
- "Sally of My Dreams", 1929
- "Fine and Dandy", 1930
- "I'm Gettin' Sentimental Over You" (first version, Brunswick, Jean Bowes, vocals), 1932
- "Ooh! That Kiss", 1932
- "Old Man Harlem", 1933
- "I'm Gettin' Sentimental Over You" (second version, Decca Records, Bob Crosby, vocals), 1934; used by Tommy Dorsey on Victor Records as his Theme Song after he formed his own band in 1935
- "Lost in a Fog", 1934
- "What a Diff'rence a Day Made", 1934
- "You're the Top", 1934
- "Annie's Cousin Fannie", 1934, Brunswick and Decca versions, composed and arranged by Glenn Miller
- "Tomorrow's Another Day", 1935, composed and arranged by Glenn Miller
- "Harlem Chapel Chimes", 1935, composed and arranged by Glenn Miller
- "Chasing Shadows", 1935, No. 1
- "Every Little Moment", 1935
- "Every Single Little Tingle of My Heart", 1935
- "I'll Never Say Never Again Again", 1935
- "I've Got a Feelin' You're Foolin'", 1935
- "Dese Dem Dose", 1935, composed and arranged by Glenn Miller
- "Lullaby of Broadway", 1935, No. 1
- "Night Wind", 1935
- "Solitude", 1935
- "The Gentlemen Obviously Doesn't Believe (In Love)", 1935
- "Tiny Little Fingerprints", 1935
- "You Are My Lucky Star", 1935

== Members ==
- Mildred Bailey (vocals)
- Bunny Berigan (trumpet)
- Artie Bernstein (string bass)
- Buzz Brauner (tenor sax)
- Bing Crosby (vocal)
- Bob Crosby (vocal)
- Skeets Herfurt (alto sax)
- Roc Hillman (guitar)
- Alberta Hunter (vocals)
- Stan King (drums)
- Mannie Klein (trumpet)
- Carl Kress (guitar)
- Eddie Lang (guitar)
- Don Matteson (trombone)
- Johnny Mercer (vocals)
- Leo McConville (trumpet)
- Dick McDonough (guitar)
- Fulton McGrath (piano)
- Ray McKinley (drums)
- Glenn Miller (trombone, arranger)
- Chauncey Morehouse (drums)
- Phil Napoleon (trumpet)
- Adrian Rollini (bass sax)
- Arthur Schutt (piano)
- Frank Schumacher (clarinet, tenor sax)
- Glenn Stainer (tenor Sax)
- Frank Signorelli (piano)
- Charlie Spivak (trumpet)
- Jack Stacey (tenor sax)
- Joe Tarto (brass bass)
- Jack Teagarden (trombone)
- George Thow (trumpet)
- Bobby van Eps (piano)
- Joe Venuti (violin)
- Mae West (vocals)
- Joe Yukl (trombone)
