= List of Billboard number-one singles of 1942 =

This is a list of number-one songs in the United States during the year 1942 according to The Billboard.

The National Best Selling Retail Records chart was the first to poll retailers nationwide on record sales. The chart was billed as a "trade service feature," based on the "10 best selling records of the past week" at a selection of national retailers from New York to Los Angeles.

Shown is a list of songs that topped the National Best Selling Retail Records chart in 1942.

Issue date	Song	Artist(s)	Ref.
January 3	"Chattanooga Choo Choo"	Glenn Miller and His Orchestra with Tex Beneke and the Four Modernaires	
January 10	"Chattanooga Choo Choo"	Glenn Miller and His Orchestra with Tex Beneke and the Four Modernaires	
January 17	"Chattanooga Choo Choo"	Glenn Miller and His Orchestra with Tex Beneke and the Four Modernaires	
January 24	"Chattanooga Choo Choo"	Glenn Miller and His Orchestra with Tex Beneke and the Four Modernaires	
January 31	"Chattanooga Choo Choo"	Glenn Miller and His Orchestra with Tex Beneke and the Four Modernaires	
February 7	"A String of Pearls"	Glenn Miller and His Orchestra	
February 14	"Blues in the Night"	Woody Herman and His Orchestra with Woody Herman	
February 21	"A String of Pearls"	Glenn Miller and His Orchestra	
February 28	"Moonlight Cocktail"	Glenn Miller and His Orchestra with Ray Eberle and the Modernaires	
March 7	"Moonlight Cocktail"	Glenn Miller and His Orchestra with Ray Eberle and the Modernaires	
March 14	"Moonlight Cocktail"	Glenn Miller and His Orchestra with Ray Eberle and the Modernaires	
March 21	"Moonlight Cocktail"	Glenn Miller and His Orchestra with Ray Eberle and the Modernaires	
March 28	"Moonlight Cocktail"	Glenn Miller and His Orchestra with Ray Eberle and the Modernaires	
April 4	"Moonlight Cocktail"	Glenn Miller and His Orchestra with Ray Eberle and the Modernaires	
April 11	"Moonlight Cocktail"	Glenn Miller and His Orchestra with Ray Eberle and the Modernaires	
April 18	"Moonlight Cocktail"	Glenn Miller and His Orchestra with Ray Eberle and the Modernaires	
April 25	"Moonlight Cocktail"	Glenn Miller and His Orchestra with Ray Eberle and the Modernaires	
May 2	"Moonlight Cocktail"	Glenn Miller and His Orchestra with Ray Eberle and the Modernaires	
May 9	"Tangerine"	Jimmy Dorsey and His Orchestra with Bob Eberly and Helen O'Connell	
May 16	"Tangerine"	Jimmy Dorsey and His Orchestra with Bob Eberly and Helen O'Connell	
May 23	"Tangerine"	Jimmy Dorsey and His Orchestra with Bob Eberly and Helen O'Connell	
May 30	"Tangerine"	Jimmy Dorsey and His Orchestra with Bob Eberly and Helen O'Connell	
June 6	"Tangerine"	Jimmy Dorsey and His Orchestra with Bob Eberly and Helen O'Connell	
June 13	"Tangerine"	Jimmy Dorsey and His Orchestra with Bob Eberly and Helen O'Connell	
June 20	"Sleepy Lagoon"	Harry James and His Orchestra	
June 27	"Sleepy Lagoon"	Harry James and His Orchestra	
July 4	"Sleepy Lagoon"	Harry James and His Orchestra	
July 11	"Sleepy Lagoon"	Harry James and His Orchestra	
July 18	"Jingle Jangle Jingle"	Kay Kyser and His Orchestra with Harry Babbitt, Julie Conway and the Group	
July 25	"Jingle Jangle Jingle"	Kay Kyser and His Orchestra with Harry Babbitt, Julie Conway and the Group	
August 1	"Jingle Jangle Jingle"	Kay Kyser and His Orchestra with Harry Babbitt, Julie Conway and the Group	
August 8	"Jingle Jangle Jingle"	Kay Kyser and His Orchestra with Harry Babbitt, Julie Conway and the Group	
August 15	"Jingle Jangle Jingle"	Kay Kyser and His Orchestra with Harry Babbitt, Julie Conway and the Group	
August 22	"Jingle Jangle Jingle"	Kay Kyser and His Orchestra with Harry Babbitt, Julie Conway and the Group	
August 29	"Jingle Jangle Jingle"	Kay Kyser and His Orchestra with Harry Babbitt, Julie Conway and the Group	
September 5	"Jingle Jangle Jingle"	Kay Kyser and His Orchestra with Harry Babbitt, Julie Conway and the Group	
September 12	"(I've Got a Gal In) Kalamazoo"	Glenn Miller and His Orchestra with Tex Beneke, Marion Hutton and the Modernaires	
September 19	"(I've Got a Gal In) Kalamazoo"	Glenn Miller and His Orchestra with Tex Beneke, Marion Hutton and the Modernaires	
September 26	"(I've Got a Gal In) Kalamazoo"	Glenn Miller and His Orchestra with Tex Beneke, Marion Hutton and the Modernaires	
October 3	"(I've Got a Gal In) Kalamazoo"	Glenn Miller and His Orchestra with Tex Beneke, Marion Hutton and the Modernaires	
October 10	"(I've Got a Gal In) Kalamazoo"	Glenn Miller and His Orchestra with Tex Beneke, Marion Hutton and the Modernaires	
October 17	"(I've Got a Gal In) Kalamazoo"	Glenn Miller and His Orchestra with Tex Beneke, Marion Hutton and the Modernaires	
October 24	"(I've Got a Gal In) Kalamazoo"	Glenn Miller and His Orchestra with Tex Beneke, Marion Hutton and the Modernaires	
October 31	"White Christmas"	Bing Crosby with the Ken Darby Singers and John Scott Trotter and His Orchestra	
November 7	"White Christmas"	Bing Crosby with the Ken Darby Singers and John Scott Trotter and His Orchestra	
November 14	"White Christmas"	Bing Crosby with the Ken Darby Singers and John Scott Trotter and His Orchestra	
November 21	"White Christmas"	Bing Crosby with the Ken Darby Singers and John Scott Trotter and His Orchestra	
November 28	"White Christmas"	Bing Crosby with the Ken Darby Singers and John Scott Trotter and His Orchestra	
December 5	"White Christmas"	Bing Crosby with the Ken Darby Singers and John Scott Trotter and His Orchestra	
December 12	"White Christmas"	Bing Crosby with the Ken Darby Singers and John Scott Trotter and His Orchestra	
December 19	"White Christmas"	Bing Crosby with the Ken Darby Singers and John Scott Trotter and His Orchestra	
December 26	"White Christmas"	Bing Crosby with the Ken Darby Singers and John Scott Trotter and His Orchestra	

== Number-one artists ==
List of number-one artists by total weeks at number one
Artists	Weeks at #1
Glenn Miller	24
Bing Crosby	9
Kay Kyser	8
Jimmy Dorsey	6
Harry James	4
Woody Herman	1

== See also ==
- 1942 in music
