= Wally Besser =

- Also known as: Wally
- Born: 16 January 1936; Minneapolis, Minnesota, United States
- Died: 4 April 2017 (aged 81) Jupiter, Florida
- Genres: Jazz
- Occupation: Singer-songwriter
- Instruments: trumpet, flugelhorn, valve trombone, keyboard, vibes
- Years active: 1957–2017

Wally Besser (January 16, 1936 - April 4, 2017) was a trumpet and flugelhorn player with a large career playing with best orchestras as the Glenn Miller Orchestra, the Sammy Kaye Orchestra, or Larry Elgart. He spent twenty years with Fotis Gonis Express doing the top Greek work in New York and around the country, as well as Canada and Venezuela. From 1984 to 1994 he led a successful wedding band, part of Steven Scott Orchestras on Long Island NY. The core was him, Gary Pace (keys), Craig Niederberger (guitar), Christine Beckett (vocals), Ron Vincent, Dave Tangrini (drums) and Bill Kirshner (sax, clar, flute)

== Life ==
=== Early life ===
Besser was born on January 16, 1936, in Minneapolis, Minnesota. He attended Douglas elementary school until he was seven years old and then his parents bought a large old house in Excelsior, Minnesota on Lake Minnetonka.

The family had a very large garden complete with a chicken coop, which kept his mom and children busy and helped supply them with food. His father was a left-handed piano player and singer in the style of Fats Waller. His father continued to perform until he built a small grocery store at which time he put aside the music business and ran the store, together with his wife and children.

Besser took piano lessons as a child but they did not take. Finally when he could not compete as an athlete (for health reasons), he took up the trumpet in his junior year in high school.

=== Getting into music ===
After graduation from Minnetonka High School, he went on to study privately at MacPhail College of Music. After three semesters he was offered a job in a Polka band and he spent the summer with them in western Minnesota. Besser quit the band in the fall when his dad got back into the music business, to get him a decent job. Besser went to work in a striptease club, where they taught him "everything he knows", so he says.

He spent a couple of years with the strippers until he had enough money saved to move to Chicago, in 1957, to continue his studies. He studied trumpet with Arnold Jacobs and arranging with William Russo, while doing gigs with local bands. Besser left Chicago with a hotel Band and after a couple of months, when the band broke up, he moved to Los Angeles and spent a few uneventful months there. One day he got a letter from the military telling him to report for a physical. He went back to Minneapolis and failed his physical due to Asthma. He was now free to pursue his dream and travel the world.

=== Adventures in Barcelona ===
While living in the Devonshire Hotel in Chicago he became friendly with Jack and Phil Hand. Phil was an ex trumpet player now playing valve trombone and Jack was learning to play bass. Jack had lived in Paris during the Second World War and was a devout follower of the jazz scene. Jack Hand had moved to Spain. He wanted to start a Jazz Club there and asked Besser to join him. Besser went back to the Strip clubs to earn enough money to finance his new adventure.

Besser arrived in Barcelona in February 1959. Jack had already started a record Jazz Club in a bar called "La Selva", and had built quite a big following. The owner promised he would get all necessary permits for live music. It never happened. Jack stopped paying rent and one night they arrived to find a lock on the door. Together with Besser and a large group of jazz enthusiasts, they broke the lock and put Count Basie on the record player. One or two weeks later, once again they were locked out. Finally, one night, Jack Hand and Besser decided to try it on their own. The owner was ready for them and had them beaten up by an off duty policeman and the waiters. Besser was beaten across the back and legs and Jack had his jaw broken in three places.

The next day, Jack's brother Phil Hand arrived in Barcelona with his pregnant wife, Nancy. While recuperating the two brothers and Besser went to Sitges to see about the jazz scene. In April they founded a club called "La Galera" which they started to play in until June. And then back to Barcelona for some jazz gigs while searching for a new venue. From November 15, 1959, to February 15, 1960, they worked out a deal with a club called Jack's located at 48 Calle Parlamento. Jack's was doing great but without the necessary permits they were closed down by the authorities and out of work again. At that time, Jack's was the only place in Barcelona at where one could listen to live jazz music every day.

=== The Jamboree Jazz Club ===
At the beginning of 1960, Besser and the brothers Hand had convinced Joan Roselló to convert the basement of his bar "Los Tarantos" into a jazz club. With the help of some of the jazz followers and especially a young artist, Jordi Bonás, who painted magnificent jazz murals on the walls, the club started to happen with The Jazz Brothers (Hand brothers, Besser, plus the pianist Pere Ferré and drummer "Chip" Collins. Roselló obtained all the necessary papers and "The Jamboree Jazz Club" was born.

The Jamboree did great and The Jazz Brothers developed a big following. It even appealed to the high society crowd, but the majority of the patrons were young students, artists and people seeking something new. The club was a big success. The club, located in la Plaça Reial, became the heart of jazz music in Barcelona.

Finally after a few months and several disagreements, mostly with Jack Hand, Besser decided to move on. Their pianist, at that time, José Fuste, was offered a job as the leader of the band at "Florida Park", a night club in Madrid. He took Besser with him. Besser stayed a couple of weeks but decided it was not for him. He quit and went to work at the "Whiskey Jazz Club" in Madrid.

=== Around Europe ===
While working and jamming in Madrid, he met the members of the "Manny Kelley Orchestra", with Manny at the piano, the German bass player Pitt Rudolph, the German drummer Peer Wyboris, the Spanish sax and guitar player Pedro Iturralde, Audrey Gray on vocals and conga and Besser playing trumpet, valve trombone and vibes. These musicians were all basically jazz players, but played commercial music to make money. They worked and recorded around Spain until one day they were offered a job in Athens, Greece.

In Athens, they played at the Casino de Athens and were offered a job in Ankara, Turkey. Besser was notified that his father was seriously ill and returned to Minneapolis. When he arrived his father was still holding on, so Besser had to find work to pay bills. He took a gig with an entertaining lounge group that was working the Midwest and shortly thereafter his father died.

Besser quit the lounge group and returned to Athens, Greece, and joined the "Lavranos Orchestra" where he stayed for approximately two and a half years playing in the best hotels and doing some recording. He still came back to "Jamboree Jazz Club" in Barcelona for about two weeks where he played with his own band and Audrey Gray on vocals. He then went to Madrid to look for work, then to Seville, Kenitra, Morocco, and finally returned to Athens to re-join the "Lavranos Band". From May 1966, to October 1967, they worked around Europe.

=== Big business in New York City ===
On October 27, 1967, Besser returned to New York City with the intention of joining a "Name Band" or else going to Las Vegas to seek work. Within two days he was offered a job traveling with "The Glenn Miller Orchestra under the direction of Buddy DeFranco. Besser stayed with the band until June 28, 1970, when he left to go with the "Billy Maxted Jazz Band". He stayed with Maxted until the winter of 1971, when he decided to try to make it in New York City. At first he worked with some Latin bands, did a few gigs in the Catskills and a few nightclubs. In September 1971 he was offered a job in a new Greek/Israeli club "Sirocco". He stayed for a year and then went to a new club "Alexander the Great" which only lasted a short while.

On September 7, 1973, he married Shelley Drayer, who was working in the stock market, then moving on to Swiss Air and then started her own financing business. They lived on West 91st Street in Manhattan until 1974, when they bought a house in Long Beach Long Island. Besser was then doing private parties plus contracting the musicians and playing with the Ringling Brothers Barnum and Bailey Circus in Madison Square Garden, Nassau Coliseum, West Palm Beach, Miami and New Jersey. He was then accepted an offer to lead a wedding band for the Steven Scott Orchestras, where he stayed for approximately seven years moving on to Alex Donner society band as a leader, contractor, salesman and co-producer as well as conductor of Alex's two CDs.

=== Five gigs a week ===
In June 2007 Besser and his wife sold their New York home and moved to Jupiter Florida. After breaking his left wrist, fractured his right hip and got through a left vocal cord cancer, he is now living Florida and playing five nights a week in many different bands.

== Studies ==
- Private studies at MacPhail College of Music – Minneapolis.
- Private trumpet lessons with James Mckay and Daniel Tetzlaf-Minneapolis Symphony.
- Private trumpet lessons with Arnold Jacobs-Chicago Symphony.
- Private arranging/composition lessons with William Russo-Chicago.
- Private trumpet lessons with Carmine Caruso – New York City.

== Discography ==
- 2 EPs Manny Kelly
- 1 LP Trio Bel Canto
- 1 EP Gerassimos Lavranos and Rebetta Nova
- 1 LP Dance With Gerassimos Lavranos
- 1 LP Glenn Miller Orchester Directed by Buddy DeFranco Do You Wanna Dance
- 1 LP Glenn Miller Orchestra Directed By Buddy De Franco: Recorded live, Royal Festival Hall, London, England.

== Bibliography ==
Pujol Baulenas, Jordi (2005). Jazz en Barcelona 1920–1965. Barcelona: Almendra Music.
