= Ray McKinley =

American jazz musician (1910–1995)

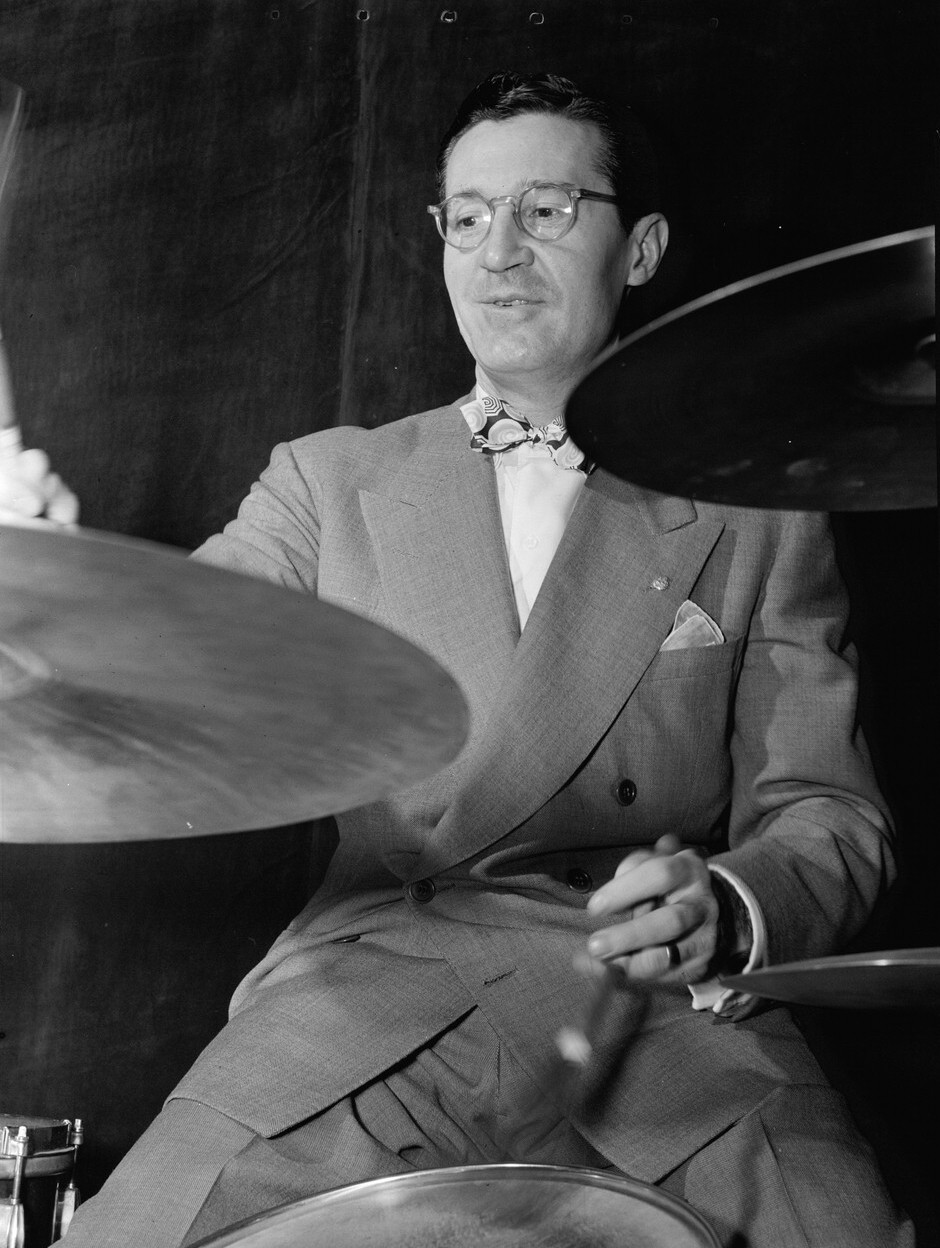
- William P. Gottlieb's photograph of McKinley at the Hotel Commodore, New York, c. April 1946

Background information
- Also known as: "Eight Beat Mac", "Mac"
- Born: Raymond McKinley; June 18, 1910; Fort Worth, Texas, U.S.
- Died: May 7, 1995 (aged 84)
- Genres: Jazz, Big band
- Occupation: Bandleader
- Instrument: Drums
- Years active: 1926–1980s
- Labels: Decca, Capitol, Majestic, RCA Victor, Epic, Dot, Savoy
- Formerly of: Jimmy Dorsey, Will Bradley Orchestra, Glenn Miller, and the Glenn Miller Orchestra
- Past members: lead saxophonists Ray Beller (1940s) and Lenny Hambro (1950s and 1960s), tenor saxist Bobby Jones, baritone saxophonist-arranger Deane Kincaide, trumpeter Bobby Nichols, arranger Eddie Sauter

Ray McKinley (June 18, 1910 – May 7, 1995) was an American jazz drummer, singer, and bandleader. He played drums and later led the Major Glenn Miller Army Air Forces Orchestra in Europe. He also led the new Glenn Miller Orchestra in 1956.

== Career ==
Born in Fort Worth, Texas, United States, McKinley's parents bought him his first drum set at the age of nine. Soon after he began playing with a local band called The Jolly Jazz Band in the Dallas–Fort Worth area. He left home when he was 15 and played with Milt Shaw's Detroiters and the Smith Ballew and Duncan-Marin bands. His first substantial professional engagement came in 1934 with the Dorsey Brothers' Orchestra. It was with the Smith Ballew band in 1929 that McKinley met Glenn Miller. The two formed a friendship that lasted from 1929 until Miller's death in 1944. McKinley and Miller joined the Dorsey Brothers in 1934. Miller left for Ray Noble in December 1934, while McKinley remained.

The Dorsey brothers split in 1935, with McKinley remaining with Jimmy Dorsey until 1939, when he joined Will Bradley, becoming co-leader. McKinley's biggest hit with Bradley, as a singer, was "Beat Me Daddy, Eight to the Bar", which he recorded early in the year 1940 (and for which he got partial songwriting credit under his wife's maiden name Eleanore Sheehy). McKinley is referred to as "Eight Beat Mack" in the lyrics to the song "Down the Road a Piece," which he recorded as a trio with Will Bradley and Freddie Slack in 1940. This was the earliest recording of the song, which was written specifically for Bradley's band by Don Raye.

McKinley and Bradley split in 1942 and McKinley formed his own band, which recorded for Capitol Records. The McKinley band was short-lived. When McKinley broke up the band, he joined the Major Glenn Miller Army Air Forces Orchestra, which he co-led with arranger Jerry Gray after Miller's disappearance in December 1944. Upon being discharged at the end of the following year, McKinley formed a modern big band that featured a book of original material by legendary arranger Eddie Sauter (along with a helping of novelty vocals by the leader). Sam Butera, later of the back-up band for Louis Prima was also a member. But with the business in decline, by 1950 McKinley began evolving into a part-time leader and sometime radio and TV personality.

In 1956, capitalizing on the popularity of The Glenn Miller Story movie with James Stewart, McKinley was chosen to be the leader of the revived Glenn Miller Orchestra that still continues to operate, which he led until 1966. He co-hosted, with former Air Force band vocalist Johnny Desmond, a 13-week CBS-TV summer replacement series with the band called Glenn Miller Time in 1961.

Ray McKinley's last recording session was in 1977 for Chiaroscuro Records.

== Compositions ==
Ray McKinley wrote the lyrics to the 1945 wartime song "My Guy's Come Back" with music by Mel Powell. The song was recorded by Benny Goodman with vocals by Liza Morrow and was released as a Columbia Records 78 single in 1945 and as a V-Disc in February, 1946 as No. 585A. He composed the songs "Howdy Friends", "Jiminy Crickets", "Bahama Mama", and "Hoodle Addle" in 1947. He wrote "Old Doc Yak" with Freddie Slack. He received a songwriting credit for "Beat Me Daddy, Eight to the Bar" using his wife's name.

== Selected discography ==
=== With Will Bradley ===
- Will Bradley & Ray McKinley, (Columbia 123, 1947, No. 2 US)

=== Note ===
- note: all recordings credited to Ray McKinley & His Orchestra

10" shellac (78-rpm) and 7" vinyl (45-rpm) releases

=== Hit Records ===
- 7005: "I'll Keep The Lovelight Burning" / "Who Wouldn't Love You" (1942)
- 7006: "Got The Moon In My Pocket" / "This Is Worth Fighting For" (1942)

=== Capitol Records ===
- 117: "Manhattan Serenade" / "Without A Song" (1942)
- 128: "Rock-a-bye Bay" / "That Russian Winter" (1942)
- 131: "Big Boy" / "Hard Hearted Hannah" (1943)

=== Majestic Records ===
- 7169: "Patience And Fortitude" / "You've Got Me Crying Again" (1946)
- 7178: "We'll Gather Lilacs" / "Have Ya' Got Any Gum, Chum" (1946)
- 7184: "In The Land Of The Buffalo Nickel" / "Sand Storm" (1946)
- 7189: "Down The Road A Piece" / "One Love" (1946)
- 7190: "I'm a Big Girl Now, Pt. 1" / "I'm a Big Girl Now, Pt. 2" (1946) - both sides credited to Ray McKinley & His Soda Fountain Seven
- 7201: "That Little Dream Got Nowhere" / "Hangover Square" (1946)
- 7206: "Borderline" / "Tumblebug" (1946)
- 7207: "Passe" / "Hoodle-addle" (1946) - just McKinley's quartet on the B-side
- 7211: "That's Where I Came In" / "Howdy Friends" (1946)
- 7216: "Red Silk Stockings and Green Perfume" / "Jiminy Crickets" (1946)
- 7223: "Ivy" / "Meet Me At No Special Place (And I'll Be There At No Particular Time)" (1947)
- 7249: "Pancho Maxmillian Hernandez" / "The Turntable Song" (1947)
- 7274: "Civilization (Bongo, Bongo, Bongo)" / "Those Things Money Can't Buy" (1947)
- 7275: "Your Red Wagon" / "A Man's Best Friend Is A Bed" (1947)
- 1185: "Over The Rainbow" / "You Don't Have To Know The Language" (1947)
- 1187: "Mint Julep" / "Lazy Bones" (1947)

=== RCA Victor ===
- 20-2736: "Airizay" / "Cincinnati" (1947)
- 20-2768: "Tambourine" / "A Man Could Be A Wonderful Thing" (1947)
- 20-2873: "Put 'em in a Box, Tie 'em with a Ribbon, and Throw 'em in the Deep Blue Sea" / "You Can't Run Away from Love" (1947)
- 20-2913: "You Came a Long Way from St. Louis" / "For Heaven's Sake" (1947)
- 20-2993: "All The Way From San Jose" / "Bahama Mama" (1947)
- 20-3049: "My Kind Of Love" / "The Morning Glory Road" (1947)
- 20-3086: "Idiot's Delight" / "Cyclops" (1947)
- 20-3097: "All The Way From San Jose" / "Mumbo Jumbo In Your Gumbo" (1947)
- 20-3124: "What Did I Do" / "The Morning Glory Road" (1947)
- 20-3334: "Sunflower" / "Little Jack Frost Get Lost" (1949)
- 20-3377: "The Missouri Walking Preacher" / "Similau" (1949)
- 20-3436: "I'm Not Too Sure Of My L'amour" / "I Wanna Be Loved" (1949)
- 20-3507: "Only For Americans!" / "Every Night Is Saturday Night" (1949)
- 20-3546: "Where Did The Wild West Go" / "Sarong" (1949)
- 20-3660: "My Heart Stood Still" / "Blue Moon" (1950)
- 20-3661: "You Took Advantage Of Me" / "It's Easy To Remember" (1950)
- 20-3662: "Blue Room" / "Thou Swell" (1950)
- 20-3678: "I Gotta Have My Baby Back" / "For You My Love" (1950)
- 20-3709: "I Don't Wanna Be Kissed (By Anyone But You)" / "The Third Man Theme" (1950)
- 20-3769: "The Lonesomest Whistle" / "Cane Bottom Chair" (1950) - the B-side credited to Ray McKinley & Some Of The Boys
- 20-3849: "Rock-a-bye The Boogie" / "Boogie Woogie Washerwoman" (1950)
- 20-3973: "Sam, Don't Slam The Door!" / "Mama's Gone, Good Bye" (1950)
