= Sing to the Moon Tour =

2013–14 concert tour by Laura Mvula

- Tour by Laura Mvula
- Associated album: Sing to the Moon
- Start date: September 4, 2013
- End date: April 28, 2014
- Legs: 3

Sing to the Moon Tour is a worldwide concert tour by English recording artist, Laura Mvula. Visiting North America and Europe, the tour supports Mvula's debut studio album, Sing to the Moon.

== Opening acts ==
- KING (North America - Leg 1)
- Phox (North America - Leg 2)[Select venues]

== Set list ==
1. "I Am the Black Gold of the Sun" (Intro)
2. "Like the Morning Dew"
3. "Let Me Fall"
4. "She"
5. "Flying without You"
6. "Sing to the Moon"
7. "Is There Anybody Out There?" (Contains excerpts of "One Love/People Get Ready")
8. "I Don't Know What the Weather Will Be"
9. "Diamonds"
10. "Father, Father"
11. "Can't Live with the World"
12. "Green Garden"
13. "See Line Woman"
14. "That's Alright"
15. "Jump Right Out"
16. "Make Me Lovely"
17. "Human Nature"

== Tour dates ==
Date	City	Country	Venue
North America
4 September 2013	New York City	United States	Music Hall of Williamsburg
5 September 2013	New York City	United States	Le Poisson Rouge
7 September 2013	Toronto	Canada	Mod Club
9 September 2013	Philadelphia	United States	World Cafe Live
13 September 2013	Chicago	United States	Martyrs
15 September 2013	San Francisco	United States	Yoshi's Lounge
17 September 2013	Los Angeles	United States	El Rey
Europe
30 September 2013	Edinburgh	Scotland	Queens Hall
1 October 2013	Newcastle	England	Tyne Theatre
4 October 2013	London	England	O2 Shepherd’s Bush Empire
7 October 2013	Bristol	England	O2 Academy
8 October 2013	Birmingham	England	The Institute
9 October 2013	Manchester	England	The Ritz
12 October 2013	Dublin	Ireland	Olympia
13 October 2013	Belfast	Northern Ireland	Waterfront
North America
6 April 2014	Montreal	Canada	La Tulipe
7 April 2014	Boston	United States	The Sinclair
8 April 2014	Washington, D.C.	United States	The Hamilton
9 April 2014	New York City	United States	Music Hall of Williamsburg
15 April 2014	San Francisco	United States	The Independent
22 April 2014	Austin	United States	Parish
23 April 2014	Dallas	United States	House of Blues
26 April 2014	Houston	United States	Houston ifest
28 April 2014	Atlanta	United States	The Loft

== Personnel ==
Creative direction

- Laura Mvula – show direction, main vocalist, keyboardist

Band

- Troy Miller – musical director, drummer, xylophone
- Dionne Douglas – violin, backing vocals
- James Douglas – cello, backing vocals
- Iona Thomas – harp, backing vocals
- Karl Rasheed Abel – upright bass, bass guitar, backing vocals
