= Michael Jeffrey Shapiro =

American composer, conductor, and author (born 1951)

Michael Shapiro
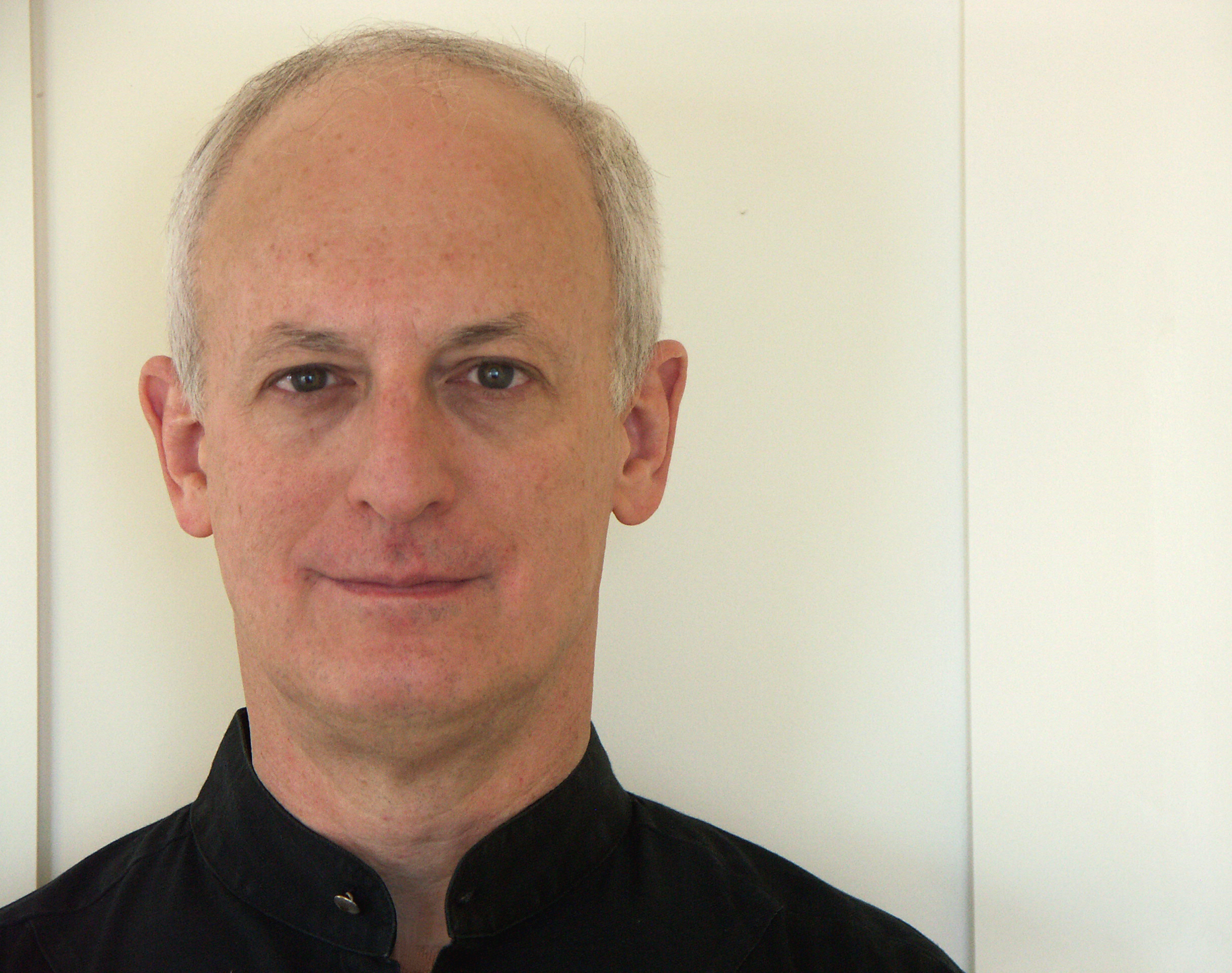
- Shapiro in 2002

Background information
- Born: Brooklyn, New York
- Genre: Classical music
- Occupations: Composer, conductor, pianist
- Website: www.michaelshapiro.com

Michael Jeffrey Shapiro is an American composer, conductor, and author.

He was born in Brooklyn, New York, and studied at Columbia College, Columbia University, the Mannes College of Music with Carl Bamberger, and the Juilliard School with Vincent Persichetti, David Diamond, and Renee Longy. He has worked with musicians and performers including Teresa Stratas, Janos Starker, Tim Fain, Matthew Kraemer, Jacob Schnitzer, Deborah Simpkin King, Stathis Karapanos, Marin Alsop, Sergiu Comissiona, Jerry Junkin, John Corigliano, David Tanenbaum, Neil W. Levin, Kim Cattrall, Miah Persson, Clamma Dale, Katherine Ciesinski, Jan Swafford, Jerome Rose, Tomer Zvulun, Adam Abeshouse, Lara Downes, Hila Plitmann, Sangeeta Kaur, Grant Gershon, and Anita Darian. He has conducted, composed for or worked with organizations including the Houston Symphony Orchestra, the United States Holocaust Memorial Museum, the American Jewish Committee, the Hawthorne String Quartet, the Royal Philharmonic Orchestra, the City of Birmingham Symphony Orchestra, the BBC National Orchestra of Wales, the Indianapolis Chamber Orchestra, the Louisiana Philharmonic Orchestra, the Binghamton Philharmonic Orchestra, the Los Angeles Opera, the Atlanta Opera, the Theater Trier, the Orchestra Sinfonica di Milano Giuseppe Verdi, the United States Navy Band, the West Point Band, the Royal Canadian Air Force Band, the Dallas Winds, the Los Angeles Master Chorale, and the Virginia Symphony Orchestra.

His exclusive publisher is Universal Edition.

His principal composition teacher with whom Shapiro studied privately for many years was Elie Siegmeister and his piano teacher was Consuelo Elsa Clark.

Shapiro was for sixteen years the music director and conductor of the Chappaqua Orchestra and has written a score for the 1931 film Frankenstein, which is in six versions for chamber orchestra, large orchestra, wind ensemble, opera, piano quintet, and organ solo. In 2024, he was nominated as a conductor for a Grammy Award for "Mythologies II" for "Best Classical Compendium."

Shapiro was music consultant to the United States Holocaust Memorial Museum and has produced and performed in concerts by Jewish composers who had fled The Holocaust or had been murdered during it, and musicians imprisoned in Theresienstadt Ghetto. His oratorio, VOICES, is a setting of poetry and songs of Sephardic victims of the Holocaust and was premiered at Central Synagogue, New York City by Deborah Simpkin King conducting Ember Choral Arts and the American Modern Ensemble. Two movements of the oratorio were later performed by Grant Gershon and the Los Angeles Master Chorale at the Ronald Reagan Presidential Library in Simi Valley, California.

His writing includes the book The Jewish 100, and research into klezmer music and into music in the plays of William Shakespeare.

In 1984, Tim Page, writing in The New York Times, described Shapiro as

a solid craftsman whose music, at its best, is marked by a direct expressivity that is often captivating. He has an ear for the English language, and three sets of terse, epigrammatic songs showed an unquestionable melodic gift. Mr. Shapiro writes in an idiom that might be characterized as gently dissonant, eschewing angular vocal leaps and bounds in favor of linear continuity.

== Selected work ==
=== Opera ===
- The Love of Don Perlimplin and Belisa in the Garden, libretto by Michael Shapiro based on the play by Federico García Lorca - a one-act opera written in 1984
- Frankenstein-The Movie Opera, soprano, mezzo-soprano, tenor, baritone, bass, and chamber orchestra (text the Latin Requiem Mass)(premiered at the Los Angeles Opera)
- The Slave, based on the novel by Isaac Bashevis Singer, libretto by Hannah McDermott (aria Let Me Live recorded by Miah Persson and the Royal Philharmonic Orchestra)

=== Film scores ===
- American Jewish Committee documentary
- Distant Relatives - Israel Broadcasting Authority
- Frankenstein-The Movie Score - six versions for fifteen player ensemble, full orchestra, wind ensemble, piano quintet, organ solo, choral and operatic forces

=== Symphonies ===
- Symphony Pomes Penyeach based on the poems of James Joyce
- Second Symphony, recorded by the City of Birmingham Symphony Orchestra
- Third Symphony
- Fourth Symphony

=== Orchestra ===
- A Declaration of Independence, July 4, 1776 for narrator and orchestra
- Lyric Variations for chamber orchestra
- like the roaring sea for orchestra
- Dublin Songs for soprano and orchestra
- Frankenstein-The Overture, recorded by the City of Birmingham Symphony Orchestra
- Frankenstein-The Movie Score (two orchestral versions - chamber ensemble (15 players) and full orchestra)
- The Headless Horseman for narrator and orchestra
- Perlimplinito, Opera Sweet, a lace paper valentine for orchestra, recorded by the BBC National Orchestra of Wales
- Widorama! for orchestra, recorded by the BBC National Orchestra of Wales
- Roller Coaster for orchestra, recorded by the BBC National Orchestra of Wales
- The Babbling Orchestra for piccolo solo, narrator and orchestra, recorded by Diva Goodfriend-Koven, piccolo, Elliott Forrest, librettist and narrator, The Chappaqua Orchestra
- "Zoomies!" for orchestra, premiered and recorded by the Indianapolis Chamber Orchestra conducted by Matthew Kraemer

=== Band ===
- Roller Coaster for band
- Widorama! for band premiered by the Dallas Winds conducted by Jerry Junkin
- Frankenstein-The Overture for wind ensemble
- Frankenstein-The Movie Score for wind ensemble
- Bamboula for band
- A Declaration of Independence, July 4, 1776 for narrator and band
- Ol' Mississippi Sings the Blues for band, dedicated to Blind Mississippi Morris
- In Every One for band
- American Interludes for band
- Tending for band (arranged by Michael Markowski), optional narration based on a poem by Cotton Mather
- "Zoomies!" for band

=== Concerti ===
- Sinfonia Concertante for violin, violoncello, and orchestra
- Concerto for guitar and strings
- Concerto for harp and strings
- Archangel Concerto for piano and orchestra, recorded by Steven Beck, pianist, BBC National Orchestra of Wales
- At the Shore of the Sea, Concerto for violin and orchestra, premiered and recorded by Tim Fain and the Indianapolis Chamber Orchestra conducted by Matthew Kraemer
- In the Light of the Sun, Concerto for flute and orchestra, recorded by Stathis Karapanos, flautist, Royal Philharmonic Orchestra
- The World to Come, Concerto for violoncello and orchestra

=== Chamber ===
- String Quartet (Yiddish), recorded by Argus Quartet
- Piano Quintet, recorded by Argus Quartet and Steven Beck, piano
- Sonata No. 1 for Violin and Piano
- Sonata No. 2 for Violin and Piano, recorded by Tim Fain, violin, and Steven Beck, piano
- Sonata for Clarinet and Piano
- Sextet for Piano and Winds
- Shir for Flute and Piano
- Yiddishkeit for Clarinet and Piano (alt. Violin and Piano or Cello and Piano)
- Musical Chairs for brass quintet (French Horn, two trumpets, trombone)
- American Realists for Clarinet, Violin, Cello, and Piano
- Watching the Students Grow for two Flutes and Piano
- Piano Trio No. 1

=== Solo Instrumental ===
- Eliahu Hanavi Variations - for solo violoncello, recorded by Sato Knudsen (Boston Symphony Orchestra)
- Peace Variations- for solo violin, recorded by Tim Fain
- Kaddish-Berakhot-Nigun - for solo flute

=== Piano ===
- Five Preludes
- Mysteries
- Sonata No. 1
- Sonata No. 2
- Bitter(sweet) Waltzes, recorded by Steven Beck
- Passages, recorded by Steven Beck
  - Creation
  - Babel
  - In the Wilderness
  - Hannah
  - A Light
  - Ruth
  - Naso
  - The Deluge
  - Hineni! (Here I Stand!)
- American Interludes, dedicated to Lara Downes
  - Calming
  - Tending
  - In Every One

=== Choral ===
- Three Psalms (SATB a cappella)
- Psalm 137 (SATB and organ)
- Three Shakespeare Madrigals (SATB a capella)
- There is that in me (Walt Whitman) (SATB and ensemble)
- Spanish Medieval Lyrics (SSATB a capella)
- Voices Oratorio based on Sephardic poetry of the Holocaust (soprano or tenor soloist, SATB, and chamber ensemble), oratorio in eight movements, recorded by Daniel Mutlu, Ember Choral Arts, American Modern Ensemble, Deborah Simpkin King, West Coast premiere by the Los Angeles Master Chorale, Grant Gershon, conductor
- In Paradisum (SATBariB and ensemble)
- Cultivo una rosa blanca (Jose Marti) (SATB and piano)
- Liberation Cantata (SATB and piano)

=== Song cycles ===
- Canciones, poetry by Federico García Lorca, recorded by Ariadne Greif
- Dublin Songs, poetry by James Joyce, recorded by Ariadne Greif in the piano version and Miah Persson, the Royal Philharmonic Orchestra, in the orchestral version
- Songs for American Poets, poetry by Walt Whitman, Teton Sioux, Carl Sandburg
- Wordsworth Songs, poetry by William Wordsworth
- Erotic Songs, poetry by Erica Jong and Denise Levertov
- A Child's Garden, poetry by Robert Louis Stevenson (from A Child's Garden of Verses)
- Whitman Songs, poetry by Walt Whitman

== Recordings ==
Recordings include:

- Eliahu Hanavi Variations - Sato Knudsen ('cello) (Naxos Records, Milken Archive of Jewish American Music)
- Variation - Peace Variations - Tim Fain (violin) and Eliahu Hanavi Variations - Sato Knudsen ('cello) (Paumanok Records)
- Second Symphony, City of Birmingham Symphony Orchestra, Michael Shapiro, conductor (Paumanok Records)
- Overture to Frankenstein-The Movie Score, City of Birmingham Symphony Orchestra, Michael Shapiro, conductor (Paumanok Records)
- Second Sonata for Violin and Piano, Tim Fain (violin) and Steven Beck (piano) (Paumanok Records)
- Archangel Concerto for Piano and Orchestra, Steven Beck (piano), BBC National Orchestra of Wales, Michael Shapiro, conductor (Paumanok Records)
- Roller Coaster, BBC National Orchestra of Wales, Michael Shapiro, conductor (Paumanok Records)
- Perlimplinito, Opera Sweet, A Lace Paper Valentine for orchestra, BBC National Orchestra of Wales, Michael Shapiro, conductor (Paumanok Records)
- Widorama!, BBC National Orchestra of Wales, Michael Shapiro, conductor (Paumanok Records)
- Michael's Songbook, Vol. I, Ariadne Greif, soprano, Michael Shapiro, piano (recordings of Canciones and Dublin Songs) (Paumanok Records)
- Passages, American Interludes, and Bitter(Sweet) Waltzes, Steven Beck, piano (Paumanok Records)
- Voices, Daniel Mutlu, tenor, Ember Choral Arts, American Modern Ensemble, Deborah Simpkin King, conductor (Paumanok Records)
- Yiddish Quartet and Piano Quintet, Argus Quartet and Steven Beck, piano (Paumanok Records)
- In the Light of the Sun, Concerto for Flute and Orchestra, Stathis Karapanos, flautist, Royal Philharmonic Orchestra, Michael Shapiro, conductor (Paumanok Records)
- Dublin Songs, poetry by James Joyce, and "Let Me Live", aria from the opera The Slave, based on the novel by Isaac Bashevis Singer, libretto by Hannah McDermott, Miah Persson, soprano, Royal Philharmonic Orchestra, Michael Shapiro, conductor (Paumanok Records)
- The Babbling Orchestra, libretto by Elliott Forrest, Diva Goodfriend-Koven, piccolo soloist, Chappaqua Orchestra, Michael Shapiro, conductor (Paumanok Records)
- Zoomies!, Indianapolis Chamber Orchestra, Matthew Kraemer, conductor (Paumanok Records)
- At the Shore of the Sea, Concerto for Violin and Orchestra, Tim Fain (violin), Indianapolis Chamber Orchestra, Matthew Kraemer, conductor (Paumanok Records)
