= Chappaqua Orchestra =

US orchestra

The Chappaqua Orchestra was founded in 1958 by Boris Koutzen and other musicians from the NBC Symphony who were residents of Chappaqua, New York, and neighboring towns in Westchester County. It annually presented a season of orchestral and chamber concerts. Conductor Andrew Litton's first conducting directorship was with the Chappaqua Orchestra, and the orchestra was also conducted by Norman Leyden, Wolfgang Schanzer, Jesse Levine, James Sadewhite, and Michael Jeffrey Shapiro.

The orchestra has premiered and commissioned works from composers such as Paul Creston, John Corigliano, Lowell Liebermann, Michael Jeffrey Shapiro, Emily Wong, and David Macdonald. Soloists such as Vanessa L. Williams, Ruth Laredo, Joseph Fuchs, Kikuei Ikeda, Jerome Rose, Jon Manasse, Tim Fain, and others have appeared with the orchestra. Michael Jeffrey Shapiro was the orchestra's last music director and conductor.
