= 12 Years a Slave (soundtrack) =

2013 soundtrack album by various artists

Music from and Inspired by 12 Years a Slave

Soundtrack album by Various artists
- Released: November 5, 2013 (digital); November 11, 2013 (physical)
- Recorded: 2013
- Genre: Blues; R&B; soul; neo soul
- Length: 42:24
- Label: Columbia 88843 00857 2
- Producer: Hans Zimmer; John Legend; Tim Fain

Hans Zimmer chronology
Mr. Morgan's Last Love (2013)	Music from and Inspired by 12 Years a Slave (2013)	Winter's Tale (2014)

Music from and Inspired by 12 Years a Slave is the soundtrack album to 12 Years a Slave. It contains two tracks from the film score composed by Hans Zimmer, three tracks co-arranged by violinist Tim Fain and Nicholas Britell, and original spiritual songs written and arranged for the film by Nicholas Britell, as well as performances by Alabama Shakes, Cody ChesnuTT, Gary Clark Jr., Alicia Keys, Tim Fain, Laura Mvula, Chris Cornell, Joy Williams, John Legend, and spiritual song performances from the film.

The album was released digitally on November 5 and in physical formats on November 11, 2013, by Columbia Records in the United States.

== Development ==
Having been interested in each other's work for some time, director Steve McQueen approached composer Hans Zimmer to write the score to 12 Years a Slave after filming had completed. Zimmer was, however, reluctant to accept the offer feeling he wasn't right for the job. Zimmer explained, "I felt I wasn't the guy, in a way. It was such an important, heavy, incredible subject. [...] It took a bit of persuading from [McQueen] to give me the confidence to do it". On April 30, 2013, it was officially announced that Zimmer was scoring the film.

== Track listing ==
No.	Title	Artist(s)	Length
1.	"Devil's Dream"	Tim Fain	0:29
2.	"Roll, Jordan, Roll"	John Legend	2:47
3.	"Freight Train"	Gary Clark Jr.	2:35
4.	"Yarney's Waltz"	Tim Fain and Caitlin Sullivan	1:16
5.	"Driva Man"	Alabama Shakes	4:31
6.	"My Lord Sunshine (Sunrise)"	David Hughey and Roosevelt Credit	1:13
7.	"Move" (featuring Fink)	John Legend	3:50
8.	"Washington"	Hans Zimmer	0:25
9.	"(In the Evening) When the Sun Goes Down"	Gary Clark Jr.	4:37
10.	"Queen of the Field (Patsey's Song)"	Alicia Keys	5:37
11.	"Solomon"	Hans Zimmer	3:31
12.	"Little Girl Blue"	Laura Mvula	4:30
13.	"Misery Chain" (featuring Joy Williams)	Chris Cornell	5:08
14.	"Roll Jordan Roll" (featuring Chiwetel Ejiofor)	Topsy Chapman	1:57
15.	"Money Musk"	Tim Fain	0:37
16.	"What Does Freedom Mean (To a Free Man)"	Cody ChesnuTT	2:41

== Film music not included on the album ==
- "Trio in B-flat, D471" – Tim Fain and Caitlin Sullivan
- "The Old Promenade" – Tim Fain
- "Run, Nigger, Run" – John A. Lomax and Alan Lomax (arranged and adapted)
- "Awake on Foreign Shores" – Colin Stetson
- "Apache Blessing Song" – Chesley Goseyun WilsonC
- "Cotton Song" – Nicholas Britell (written)
- "Miller's Reel" – Tim Fain
- "O Teach Me Lord" – Tami Tyree, Roosevelt Credit, David Hughey and Dan'yelle Williamson
- "John" – John Davis (written)

== Commentary ==
12 Years a Slave is a stunningly powerful film. I was so moved when I saw it. I felt every minute of it and was so inspired to contribute to the music of the soundtrack. This album brings together some incredible artists from different places and different genres who have all been touched by the film. When artists are inspired by great art, it makes us want to create. This album is the result of that inspiration.

—John Legend

We chose a song called "Driva Man". It is a sparse, brooding, slow-swinging jazz number. There is no lightness in the music of "Driva' Man" because there is no mention of freedom in this song. The focus of the track is about an enslaved person reaching "quittin' time" while also trying to please the overseer to avoid getting beaten. After we watched 12 Years a Slave in our hometown of Athens, Alabama, we stumbled across this song a week later. It is a very simple song which is why we chose it to contribute to the soundtrack. The two works, for a moment, take the audience into another time and place where you can imagine being denied your freedom: after which, one's own freedom can be better appreciated. 12 Years is one of the most important films we have ever seen and it is important to us to give back some of what the movie has given to us.

—Brittany Howard of the Alabama Shakes

I was moved by this film and the story in a way that transcends any film experience I have ever had. I was inspired to write a hundred different songs, but finally landed on one based on what I believe is an extremely important message I took from this man's journey. Compassion, basic human rights and love must be our priorities above race, religion or commerce. Every generation needs a reminder of that simple idea.

—Chris Cornell
