= Black Swan: Original Motion Picture Soundtrack =

Soundtrack album by Clint Mansell
- Released: November 30, 2010
- Recorded: 2010
- Genre: Contemporary classical
- Length: 52:38
- Language: Instrumental
- Label: Sony Classical; Fox Music

Clint Mansell chronology
Faster (2010)	Black Swan: Original Motion Picture Soundtrack (2010)	United (2011)

Black Swan: Original Motion Picture Soundtrack is the soundtrack album to the 2010 film Black Swan.

== Overview ==
The album marked the fifth consecutive collaboration between Aronofsky and English composer Clint Mansell. Mansell scored the film based on Tchaikovsky's ballet Swan Lake, but with radical changes to the music. Because of the use of Tchaikovsky's music, the score was deemed ineligible to be entered into the 2010 Academy Awards for Best Original Score.

Violinist Tim Fain was featured in performance both on-screen and in the soundtrack of Black Swan, and the film also featured various new pieces of music by English production duo The Chemical Brothers, although they are not featured on the official soundtrack.

== Track listing ==
No.	Title	Length
1.	"Nina's Dream"	2:48
2.	"Mother Me"	1:06
3.	"The New Season"	2:39
4.	"A Room of Her Own"	1:56
5.	"A New Swan Queen"	3:28
6.	"Lose Yourself"	2:08
7.	"Cruel Mistress"	3:29
8.	"Power, Seduction, Cries"	1:42
9.	"The Double"	2:20
10.	"Opposites Attract"	3:45
11.	"Night of Terror"	8:01
12.	"Stumbled Beginnings..."	3:51
13.	"It's My Time"	1:30
14.	"A Swan Is Born"	1:38
15.	"Perfection"	5:45
16.	"A Swan Song (For Nina)"	6:23
Total length:		52:38
