= Pink Noise (album) =

Studio album by Laura Mvula
- Released: 2 July 2021
- Studio: Firepit (London); RAK (London); Spark (London); Noatune (London); Doghouse (Henley-on-Thames); Trinity House (Frome); Flightless Bird (Los Angeles)
- Genre: Electropop; R&B
- Length: 37:33
- Label: Atlantic
- Producer: Laura Mvula; Dann Hume

Laura Mvula chronology
1/f (2021)	Pink Noise (2021)

Singles from Pink Noise
- 1. "Safe Passage" Released: 3 March 2021; 2. "Church Girl" Released: 17 March 2021; 3. "Got Me" Released: 12 May 2021

Professional ratings
Aggregate scores
Source	Rating
Metacritic	89/100
Review scores
Source	Rating
Allmusic	4.5/5 stars
Clash	9/10 stars
DIY	5/5 stars
Entertainment Weekly	A−
The Arts Desk	5/5 stars
The Independent	4/5 stars
The Line of Best Fit	9/10 stars
NME	4/5 stars
The Observer	4/5 stars
Tom Hull – on the Web	B+
Retro Pop	4/5 stars

Pink Noise is the third studio album by the British singer Laura Mvula, released on 2 July 2021 by Atlantic Records. Its release was five years after The Dreaming Room, released in 2016. The album was preceded by the singles "Safe Passage" and "Church Girl", the latter being issued along with the album's announcement. The album received critical acclaim.

== Background ==
Mvula called the album the one she "always wanted to make", and described it as "made with warm sunset tones of the '80s", saying it "took three years of waiting and waiting and fighting and dying and nothingness and then finally an explosion of sound".

The album follows the 1/f EP, released in February 2021. The EP was named after the technical name for pink noise on the frequency spectrum.

== Track listing ==
All tracks are written by Laura Mvula and Dann Hume.

Pink Noise track listing
No.	Title	Length
1.	"Safe Passage"	3:12
2.	"Conditional"	2:49
3.	"Church Girl"	3:45
4.	"Remedy"	4:02
5.	"Magical"	4:12
6.	"Pink Noise"	3:29
7.	"Golden Ashes"	4:09
8.	"What Matters" (featuring Simon Neil)	4:08
9.	"Got Me"	3:26
10.	"Before the Dawn"	4:21
Total length:		37:33

== Personnel ==
Musicians

- Laura Mvula – lead vocals, backing vocals, synthesizers, synth bass
- Dann Hume – electric guitar (tracks 1–6, 9, 10), percussion (5, 7)
- Karl Rasheed-Abel – bass guitar (tracks 1, 2, 4, 5, 7, 9)
- Oli Rockberger – backing vocals (tracks 1, 3, 4)
- Troy Miller – percussion (tracks 1, 3), drums (5, 6)
- Mike Davis – trumpet (tracks 2, 4–7)
- Tom Walsh – trumpet (tracks 2, 4–7)
- Trevor Mires – trombones, bass trumpet (tracks 2, 4–7)
- James Gardiner-Bateman – saxophones (tracks 2, 4–7)
- Daniel Hutchinson – electric guitar (tracks 5, 8), backing vocals (5)
- Everton Nelson – first violin (tracks 5–7, 10)
- Marianne Haynes – second violin (tracks 5–7, 10)
- Clifton Harrison – viola (tracks 5–7, 10)
- James Douglas – cello (tracks 5–7, 10), backing vocals (5)
- Simon Neil – vocals (track 8)

Technical

- Laura Mvula – production (all tracks), drum arrangements (track 1)
- Dann Hume – production, mixing, engineering (all tracks); drum production (tracks 1–4, 6–10)
- Troy Miller – co-production, string arrangements (tracks 5, 6, 10); additional production (1–4, 7), engineering (5, 6), percussion engineering (1, 3), horn arrangements (2, 4–6),
- Stuart Hawkes – mastering, lacquer cut
- Robbie Nelson – engineering (tracks 5, 6, 10), horn engineering (2, 4, 7), string engineering (7)
- Adam Noble – Simon Neil vocal engineering (track 8)

Visuals

- Danny Kasirye – photography
- Alex Cowper – design

== Charts ==
Chart performance for Pink Noise
Chart (2021)	Peak position
Scottish Albums (OCC)	6
UK Albums (OCC)	21
UK R&B Albums (OCC)	1
