= The Dreaming Room =

Studio album by Laura Mvula
- Released: 17 June 2016
- Recorded: 2015–2016
- Genre: Soul; R&B
- Length: 36:17
- Label: RCA Victor, Columbia
- Producer: Troy Miller; Laura Mvula; The London Symphony Orchestra

Laura Mvula chronology
Sing to the Moon (2013)	The Dreaming Room (2016)	Pink Noise (2021)

Singles from The Dreaming Room
- 1. "Overcome" Released: 21 January 2016; 2. "Phenomenal Woman" Released: 4 May 2016; 3. "Show Me Love" Released: 27 May 2016; 4. "Ready or Not" Released: 4 November 2016

The Dreaming Room is the second studio album by British singer Laura Mvula, released three years after her debut album. It features production works from executive producer Troy Miller and has been heavily produced by the instrumental crew that make up The London Symphony Orchestra. The album was released on 17 June 2016 through RCA Records.

== Background ==
After the moderate success of Mvula's debut album Sing to the Moon, she began working on different projects. On 6 December 2013, she recorded a track, entitled "Little Girl Blue", which ended up being part of the original soundtrack for the 2013 film 12 Years A Slave. The track was produced by Troy Miller, which was Mvula's first ever encounter with him. It was from this point which she wanted to work with him on her second album.

Then, within 2015, she recorded another track, which was entitled, "You Work For Me", which was her second soundtrack recording. It was released as part of the original soundtrack for the 2015 film The Man From U.N.C.L.E.. This song was also produced by Troy Miller.

== Release ==
Then, on 21 January 2016, Laura Mvula released her first single in three years and was entitled "Overcome". It featured production works from electric guitarist Nile Rodgers whom, at the time, was working with other artists. It was later to be revealed that the song was Rodger's first ever major feature of 2016 as part of an ever-growing project of working with a variety of artists and musicians, such as NERVO, Sigala, Alex Newell, DJ Cassidy and Jess Glynne. The song was revealed to have been a concept that Mvula was working on since her first encounter with Troy Miller, who produced the song, and Rodgers asked if he could work with her, telling her through Twitter, "I want to be in your universe where angels live. I worship you! We must work together", to which she immediately replied, "let's make it happen soon please".

After the song was released, the second album was announced under the title The Dreaming Room and that it was going to be released, originally, on 20 May 2016. It was also revealed that Mvula, with Troy Miller, was going to be producing the entire album, alongside the instrumental crew which make up The London Symphony Orchestra.

The album's first promotional single was released on 7 April 2016, entitled "People". The song featured vocals from rapper Wretch 32 and was released to all digital streaming platforms.

A couple of weeks later in May 2016, Laura released her second official single from the album, entitled "Phenomenal Woman". The song was revealed to have been inspired by her grandmother and classed it as being one of the most happiest songs on the album. She described it as being the kind of song that, if performed live, she could be able to "jump off the stage" if she wanted to.

After the song was released, she announced that the official release date for the album was to be pushed back to 17 June 2016 to avoid direct competition with trending artists Kygo, Meghan Trainor, Ariana Grande and Yuna.

Then, on 27 May 2016, the album's second and last promotional single was released, entitled "Show Me Love" and was released to all digital streaming platforms.

Then, to promote the album further, Mvula released an album sampler which revealed snippets of each song off of the album. Many people took to comment on the sampler, some of them stating that the instrumental track "Renaissance Moon", which was primarily produced by The London Symphony Orchestra, was likened to previous track "Sing To The Moon", which was released through her debut album. This was later confirmed to be true, prior the album's release.

The album, was eventually released prior to its delayed release date of 17 June 2016.

== Critical reception ==
Professional ratings
Aggregate scores
Source	Rating
AnyDecentMusic?	7.6/10
Metacritic	82/100
Review scores
Source	Rating
AllMusic	4.5/5 stars
Associated Press	3/5 stars
Exclaim!	9/10
The Guardian	4/5 stars
The Irish Times	4/5 stars
London Evening Standard	4/5 stars
Mixmag	8/10
Mojo	4/5 stars
Pitchfork	7.8/10
Q	4/5 stars

The Dreaming Room received critical acclaim from music critics. At Metacritic, which assigns a normalised rating out of 100 to reviews from mainstream critics, the album received an average score of 82, which indicates "universal acclaim", based on 12 reviews. Writing for Exclaim!, Ryan B. Patrick gave the album a rave review, calling it "a subconscious succession of visuals, emotions and ideas — sometimes abstract, sometimes allegorical, but always dredging up something for the conscious mind to ponder. The Dreaming Room is this and more."

== Track listing ==
The Dreaming Room – Standard edition
No.	Title	Writer(s)	Producer(s)	Length
1.	"Who I Am"	Laura Mvula	Troy Miller; Mvula	1:18
2.	"Overcome" (featuring Nile Rodgers)	Mvula; Nile Rodgers	Miller; Mvula	3:11
3.	"Bread"	Mvula; Miller	Miller; Mvula	3:22
4.	"Lucky Man"	Mvula; Miller	Miller; Mvula	2:52
5.	"Let Me Fall"	Mvula; Miller; Steve Brown	Miller; Mvula	3:40
6.	"Kiss My Feet"	Mvula; Miller	Miller; Mvula	3:43
7.	"Show Me Love"	Mvula; Miller	Miller; Mvula	6:03
8.	"Renaissance Moon"	Mvula; Brown	Miller; Mvula	0:45
9.	"Angel"	Mvula	Miller; Mvula	3:41
10.	"People" (featuring Wretch 32)	Mvula; Jermaine Scott Sinclair	Miller; Mvula	3:47
11.	"Nan"	Mvula	Mvula	1:11
12.	"Phenomenal Woman"	Mvula; Miller	Miller; Mvula	2:44
Total length:				36:17

The Dreaming Room – Special edition
No.	Title	Writer(s)	Producer(s)	Length
13.	"Ready or Not"	William Hart; Thomas Bell	Miller; Bell^{[a]}	2:32
14.	"You Work for Me"	Tobias Jesso Jr.; Chris Stracey; Jack Glass	Miller	2:49
15.	"Magic" (BBC Live Version)	Guy Berryman; Jonny Buckland; Will Champion; Chris Martin	Miller; Coldplay^{[a]}; Paul Epworth^{[a]}; Daniel Green^{[a]}; Rik Simpson^{[a]}	5:06
16.	"Silence Is the Way" (Miles Davis & Robert Glasper featuring Laura Mvula)	Miles Davis; Mvula; Josef Erich Zawinul	Davis; Robert Glasper	5:18
17.	"Same Ol' Mistakes" (BBC Live Version)	Kevin Parker	Miller; Parker^{[a]}; Kuk Harrell^{[a]}	3:37
18.	"Mellow Man"	Mvula	Miller	2:31
Total length:				58:10

Notes

- ^{^a} signifies an original producer
- "Ready or Not" is a cover of The Delfonics' "Ready or Not Here I Come (Can't Hide from Love)".
- "You Work for Me" was a song taken from the soundtrack of the 2015 film The Man from U.N.C.L.E..
- "Magic" is a cover of the Coldplay song of the same name, released through their 2014 album Ghost Stories.
- "Same Ol' Mistakes" is a cover of Tame Impala's "New Person, Same Old Mistakes" from their 2015 album Currents.
- "Mellow Man" was a song taken from the soundtrack of the 2016 film Brotherhood.

== Charts ==
Chart performance for The Dreaming Room
Chart (2016)	Peak position
Belgian Albums (Ultratop Flanders)	52
Dutch Albums (Album Top 100)	117
French Albums (SNEP)	170
Irish Albums (IRMA)	23
New Zealand Heatseeker Albums (RMNZ)	5
Scottish Albums (OCC)	20
Swiss Albums (Schweizer Hitparade)	85
UK Albums (OCC)	21
UK R&B Albums (OCC)	3
UK R&B Albums (OCC) Special Edition	15
UK Album Sales Chart (OCC)	16
US Top R&B/Hip-Hop Albums (Billboard)	50
