= Norman Leyden =

American conductor

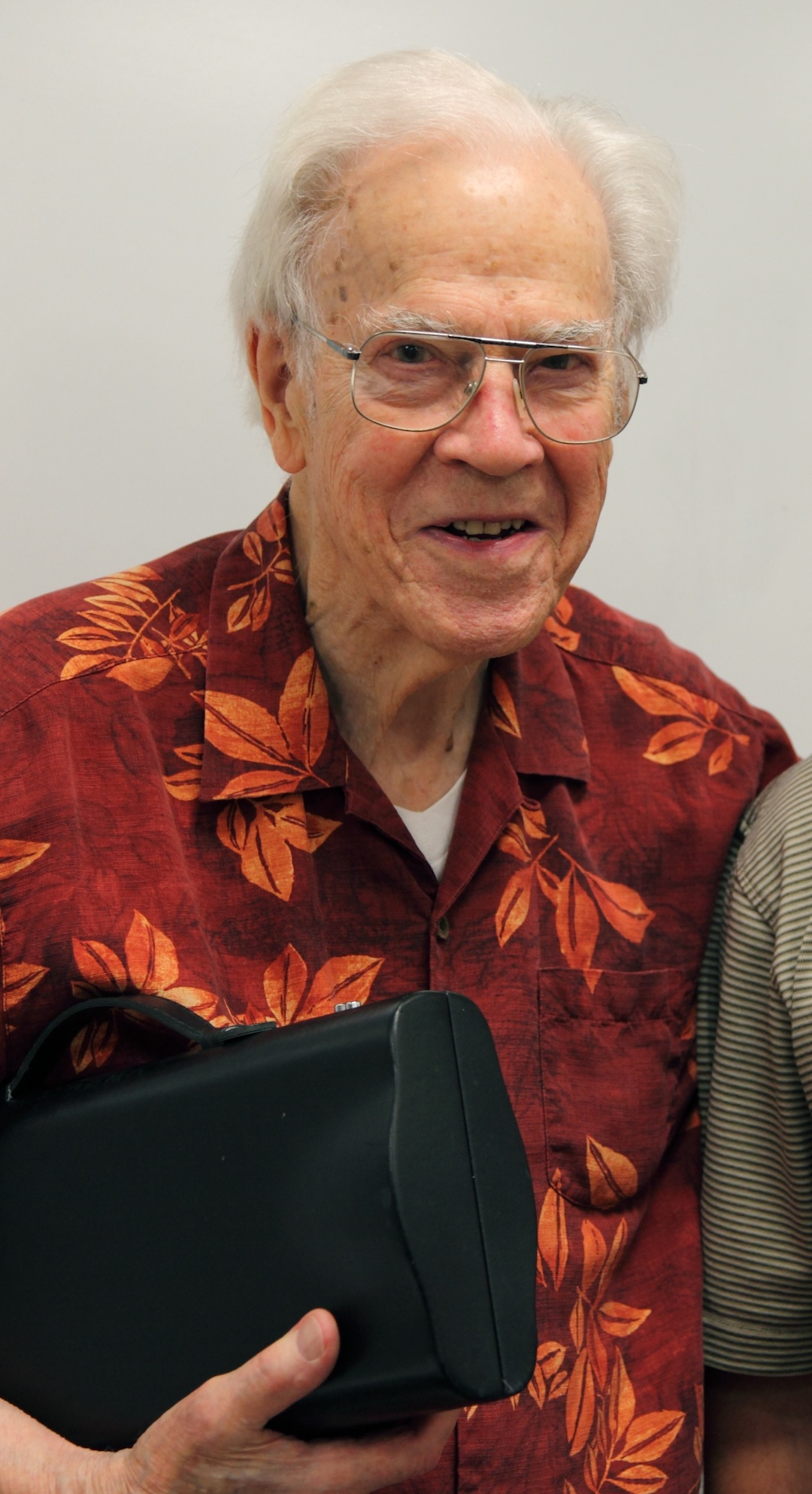
- Norman Leyden (holding his clarinet case) at a rehearsal in 2012
- Born: Norman Fowler Leyden; October 17, 1917; Springfield, Massachusetts, U.S.
- Died: July 23, 2014 (aged 96)
- Occupations: Conductor, composer, arranger, musician
- Spouse: Alice Curry Wells

Norman Fowler Leyden (October 17, 1917 – July 23, 2014) was an American conductor, composer, arranger, and clarinetist. He worked in film and television and is perhaps best known as the conductor of the Oregon Symphony Pops orchestra. He co-wrote with Glenn Miller the theme "I Sustain the Wings" in 1943, which was used to introduce the World War II radio series.

== Early years ==
Norman Leyden was born in Springfield, Massachusetts, to James A. and Constance Leyden. He graduated from Yale College in 1938, attended Pierre Monteux's Domaine Musicale in Hancock, Maine, in 1961, and earned a master's (1965) and doctoral degree (1968) from Columbia University (where he also taught for several years). He married Alice Curry Wells in 1942 in Duval County, Florida.

== Music career ==
He began his professional music career playing bass clarinet for the New Haven Symphony Orchestra while attending Yale College. After graduating from Yale, he joined the New Hampshire Army National Guard and was in Battery D, 197th Coast Artillery Regiment (Antiaircraft) of the Coast Artillery Corps, where he became a sergeant. He then enlisted as an infantry sergeant on February 24, 1941, in New Haven, Connecticut. His enlistment papers give his height as six foot two and his weight as 165 and give his specialty as a musician or band leader. He served in the U.S. Army Air Forces throughout World War II and became a master sergeant.

While Leyden was serving as an Army Air Forces master sergeant in Atlantic City, and rehearsing music, Glenn Miller heard Leyden perform. Miller said to him, "For a Yale man, you don't play bad tenor". Miller called on Leyden in September 1943 to conduct the Moss Hart Army Air Forces spectacular "Winged Victory". This was a big musical play in Broadway's Shubert Theatre with an all service band. The show started in November 1943. Leyden next requested the opportunity to arrange for Glenn Miller, and was accepted and served as one of three arrangers for Miller's Army Air Forces Orchestra. His first arrangement for the band was "Now I Know". Sometimes, Leyden would write more complexity into the score than was desirable. Miller told him once "Hey Norm, it was a nice try. But remember it ain't what you write, it's what you don't write". In 1943, Leyden composed the theme music for the wartime radio series "I Sustain the Wings" with Glenn Miller, Chummy MacGregor, and Bill Meyers. It ran from 1943 to 1944. One of the arrangements he was most proud of was that of "Long Ago and Far Away." Leyden also arranged for the reorganized Glenn Miller Orchestra of Tex Beneke.

Leyden often attended and spoke at the annual Glenn Miller Festival presented by the Glenn Miller Birthplace Society in Clarinda, Iowa. As he confirmed the title of his military musical unit, he was named the honorary president of the (formerly Captain, then-) Major Glenn Miller Army Air Forces Orchestra Veterans Association in 1994. He is among those musicians honored by a memorial American Holly tree dedicated to that organization at Arlington National Cemetery in Arlington, Virginia on December 15, 1994. Listed as Dr. Norman Fowler Leyden, Ph.D., he is in the Glenn Miller Hall of Fame, Glenn Miller Archives, American Music Research Center, University of Colorado Boulder. In August 2000, he led the Air Force Falconaires of the Air Force Band of the Rockies in a PBS television special, "Glenn Miller's Last Flight".

Between 1956 and 1959, he was musical director for Arthur Godfrey's radio program. He also worked as musical director on The $64,000 Question (including writing the theme music), and as the musical director of The Jackie Gleason Show, originally called You're in the Picture (1961). He also organized the Westchester Youth Symphony in White Plains, New York, in 1957 (an organization he led until 1968). As a staff arranger at RCA Victor he composed and arranged music for Disney and other musicals including Cinderella, Alice in Wonderland, 20,000 Leagues Under the Sea, Winnie the Pooh, Peter Pan, and Pinocchio. Leyden also conducted and arranged for many well-known artists including Tony Bennett, Rosemary Clooney, Don Cornell, Vic Damone, Johnny Desmond, The Four Lads, Johnny Hartman, Gordon MacRae, Mitch Miller, Ezio Pinza, Frank Sinatra, Jeri Southern, and Sarah Vaughan.

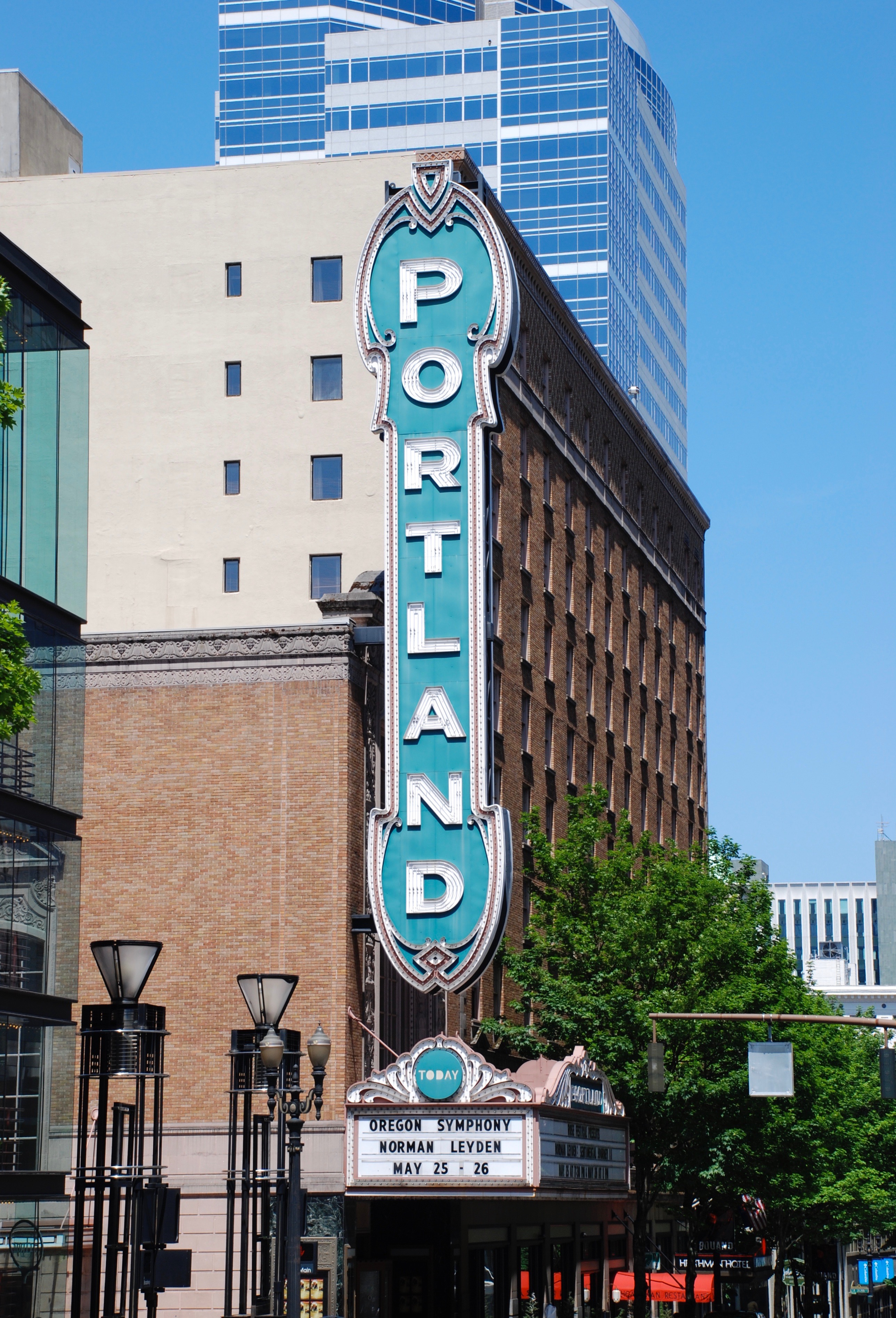
Leyden's name on the marquee of the Arlene Schnitzer Concert Hall, for an Oregon Symphony concert, in 2009

Leyden moved to Portland, Oregon, in 1968 to take over the Portland Youth Philharmonic (then the Portland Junior Symphony) while long-time conductor Jacob Avshalomov went on sabbatical. He also joined the music department at Portland State University. He began his longstanding relationship with the Oregon Symphony in 1970 as associate conductor. This lasted for 29 seasons plus 34 seasons as conductor of the Oregon Symphony Pops. Over one million people attended his Oregon Symphony Pops concerts. In May 2004, he retired and was honored with the lifetime title laureate associate conductor. Leyden also served as the music director of the Seattle Symphony Pops for eighteen seasons, and as conductor of the Indianapolis Symphony Orchestra's Prairie Pops for eight seasons. He also conducted the Chappaqua Orchestra as its second music director before moving to the West Coast. He worked with Portland-based band Pink Martini and can be heard performing a clarinet solo on the title track of the band's second album, Hang On Little Tomato.

Leyden's personal music score library, housed in an airy basement studio, included over 1,200 symphonic arrangements and 300 big band works. Into his 90s, Leyden continued to practice the clarinet every day. On Wednesday October 17, 2007, he conducted a 90th birthday concert with the 17-piece Norman Leyden Big Band at Portland's Arlene Schnitzer Concert Hall, titled Norman's Big Band Birthday Concert. He became one of just two classical musicians to be inducted into the Oregon Music Hall of Fame in 2008. He performed with Pink Martini in Seattle in August 2012, and on July 19, 2013, he debuted at the Hollywood Bowl, again with Pink Martini.

Leyden died on July 23, 2014, of an unspecified cause.

On August 28, 2014, the Oregon Symphony performed a memorial concert in Leyden's honor at Tom McCall Waterfront Park in Portland.

== Awards ==
- Oregon Governor's Arts Award, 1991
- Oregon Music Hall of Fame, inducted 2008
- Major Glenn Miller Army Air Forces Orchestra Veterans Association, Honorary President, 1994
- Memorial American Holly tree, Major Glenn Miller Army Air Forces Orchestra, dedicated December 15, 1994
- Glenn Miller Hall of Fame, Glenn Miller Archives, American Music Research Center, University of Colorado Boulder
