= Swanshurst School =

Location
- Brook Lane; Billesley; Birmingham, West Midlands, B13 0TW; England
- Coordinates: 52°25′45″N 1°52′30″W

Information
- Type: Academy (Converted January 2025)
- Motto: Achieving Excellence
- Established: 1956
- Local authority: Birmingham City Council
- Trust: West Midlands Academy Trust
- Department for Education URN: 151403 Tables
- Ofsted: Reports
- Head teacher: Mike Dunn
- Gender: Girls (Main School) Coeducational (Sixth Form)
- Age: 11 to 19
- Enrolment: 1,928 as of May 2024
- Colour: Purple
- Website: http://www.swanshurst.org/

Swanshurst School is a secondary school for girls aged 11 to 16, with a coeducational sixth form for students aged 16 to 19. It is located in Birmingham, England.

Previously a community school administered by Birmingham City Council, in January 2025 Swanshurst School converted to academy status. The school was a founding member of West Midlands Academy Trust.

Swanshurst offers GCSEs and BTECs as programmes of study for pupils, while students in the sixth form have the option to study from a range of A-Levels and further BTECs.

== Notable former pupils ==
- Lauren Crace - actress and radio presenter
- Laura Mvula - singer
- Mollie Kingsley, Amber Bradbury, Poppy Twist and Dominique Vine - collectively the pop group Poppy & the Jezebels
