= Laura Mvula =

English singer (born 1986)

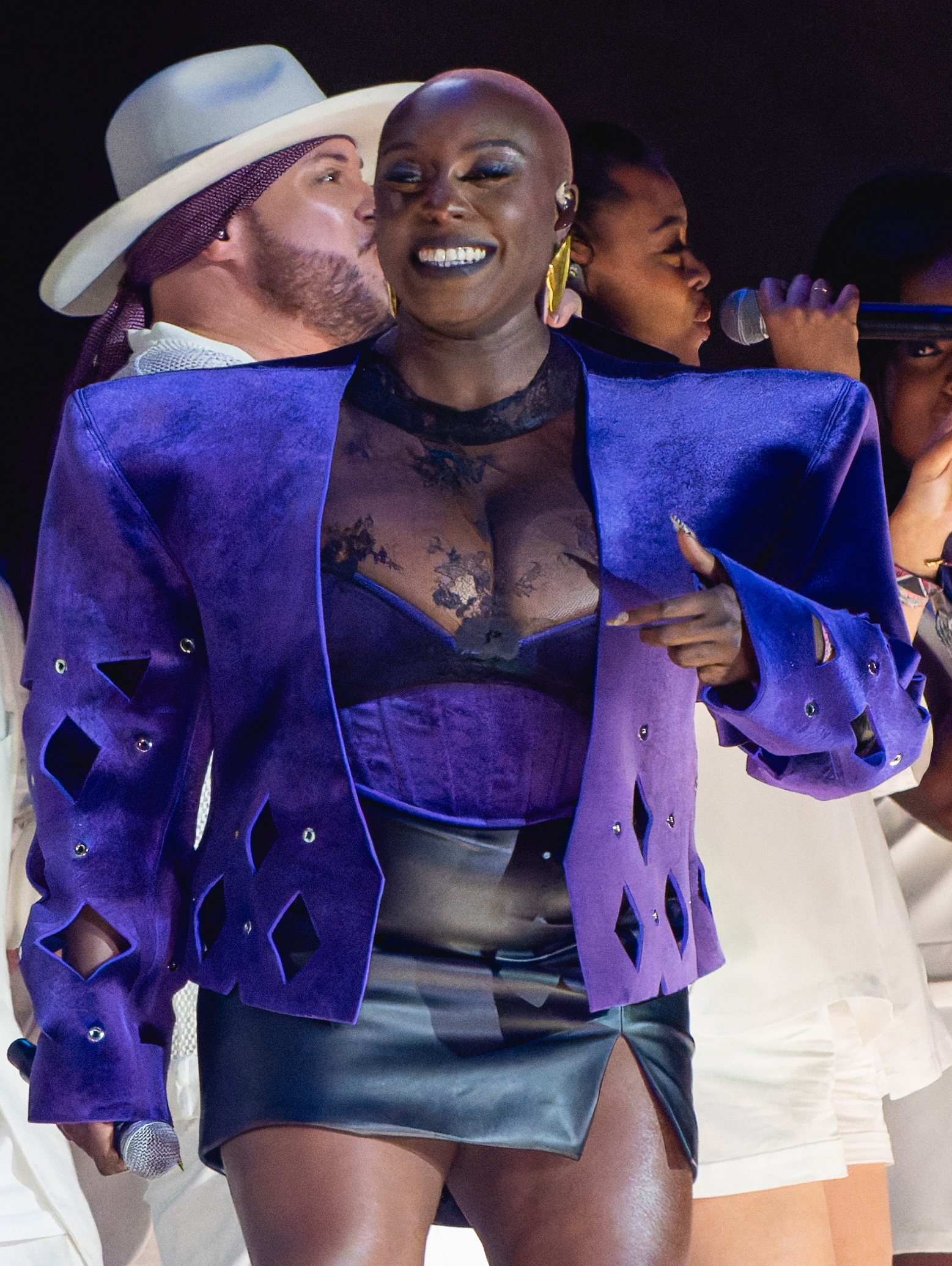
- Mvula at the Glastonbury Festival in 2024

Background information
- Born: Laura Douglas; 23 April 1986 (age 40); Birmingham, England
- Education: Birmingham City University; Royal Birmingham Conservatoire
- Genres: R&B; soul; jazz
- Occupation: Singer
- Years active: 2012–present
- Labels: Atlantic; RCA; Sony UK
- Website: lauramvula.com

Laura Mvula (née Douglas; born 23 April 1986) is a British singer. A native of Birmingham, England, Mvula gained experience as a member or leader of a cappella, jazz/neo-soul and gospel groups and choirs. She was classically trained. In 2012, she signed with RCA Records and released an extended play, She, to critical acclaim.

Mvula released her debut studio album, Sing to the Moon (2013), to favourable reviews, and earning two Music of Black Origin (MOBO) Awards and a Mercury Prize nomination. In 2014, an orchestral re-recording of the album with the Metropole Orkest was released. Her second album, The Dreaming Room (2016), was also received with critical acclaim, and won the Ivor Novello award and garnered a Mercury Prize nomination. Mvula then wrote the music for the 2017 theatre production of Antony & Cleopatra by the Royal Shakespeare Company. While working on her third album, she released the 1/f EP in February 2021.

In 2018, Mvula received an honorary doctorate of music from her alma mater, Birmingham City University.

== Early and personal life ==
Laura Mvula grew up in the Birmingham suburbs of Selly Park and Kings Heath with two younger siblings. Her mother Paula is a humanities professor and is from Saint Kitts. Her father Elford is from Jamaica and is a council worker as a youth legal protection educator. She took up piano and violin at primary school and later attended Swanshurst School for girls. In her teens, she sang with Black Voices, an a cappella group set up by her aunt Carol Pemberton; in 2005 they toured Italy and other countries. In 2008, Mvula formed a jazz/neo-soul group called Judyshouse, singing lead vocals and writing material for the band. She was director of the Lichfield Community Gospel Choir, founded by Black Voices and Lichfield Festival in 2009. She has also previously directed the Alvechurch Community Choir in Alvechurch.

In 2008, Mvula graduated from Royal Birmingham Conservatoire with a degree in composition. She worked as a supply music teacher, and later as a receptionist for the City of Birmingham Symphony Orchestra, when she began to write songs. Her sketches caught the attention of composer Steve Brown, and his manager, Kwame Kwaten, who also became Mvula's manager. In a 2013 podcast for The Daily Telegraph, she admitted to suffering from "crippling stage fright".

Mvula is her Zambia-born ex-husband's surname, which she continues to use professionally.

== Career ==
=== 2012–2015: Sing to the Moon ===
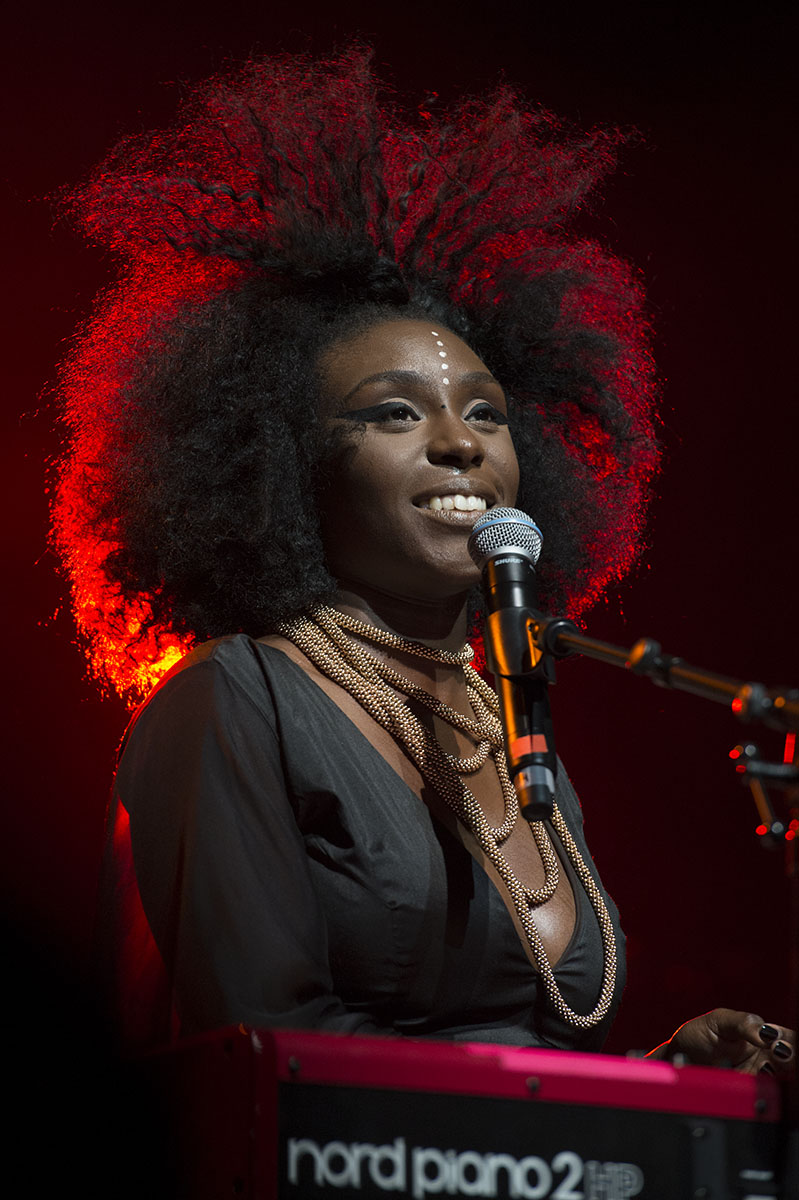
Mvula performing at the 2014 Montreux Jazz Festival

In May 2012, after several showcases, Laura Mvula was signed by Colin Barlow to Sony subsidiary RCA. She released her debut extended play, She, on 16 November 2012. The title track is the first song she ever wrote. On 6 December, she was shortlisted for the Critics' Choice award at the 2013 BRIT Awards. On 9 December, she was nominated for the BBC's Sound of 2013 poll and later finished in fourth position. On 1 February 2013, she gave her first live television performance on The Graham Norton Show on BBC One, singing "Green Garden".

Her debut studio album, Sing to the Moon, was released on 4 March 2013. She worked on the album with producer Steve Brown and mix engineer Tom Elmhirst. It was preceded by the single "Green Garden", an elegy to her home in Kings Heath. Paul Lester from The Guardian described her music as "gospeldelia", calling it a new musical genre. The album was met with a largely positive reception, receiving a perfect score from The Independent, and 3.5/5 from Rolling Stone. It reached number 9 on the UK Albums Chart and within the top 100 in seven other countries, and reached 173 on the US Billboard 200.

Mvula won awards for Best Female Act and Best R&B or Soul Artist at the 2013 MOBO Awards, which took place in October. She was also nominated for two Brit awards, Sing to the Moon was shortlisted for a Mercury Prize, and during 2013–14, she garnered more than a dozen award-nominations in different categories altogether. The same year, she recorded a cover of the popular 1935's song "Little Girl Blue", which ended up being part of the original soundtrack for the 2013 acclaimed film 12 Years A Slave. The track was produced by Troy Miller as their first collaboration.

In March 2014, the artist re-recorded an orchestral version of her debut album in collaboration with the Metropole Orkest and conducted by Jules Buckley. This was released on 23 June as a high-quality download via Bowers & Wilkins' Society of Sound and on CD on 11 August. On 19 August, she performed with the Metropole Orkest at the Albert Hall as a part of the 2014 BBC Proms Season, supported by Esperanza Spalding and ElectricVocals.

In July 2015, Mvula performed with fifty musicians of the Metropole Orkest at the North Sea Jazz Festival, one of the biggest indoor jazz festivals in the world. The same year, she recorded a track "You Work For Me"; director Guy Ritchie chose it as a part of soundtrack for his 2015 film The Man From U.N.C.L.E., the song's clip was also used in the US trailer of the movie.

=== 2016–2020: The Dreaming Room ===
In January 2016, Mvula released "Overcome", a collaboration with Nile Rodgers, and the lead single from her forthcoming second studio album, The Dreaming Room. She recorded "Sing to the Moon" with Snarky Puppy for their jazz fusion album Family Dinner - Volume 2, which was released on 12 February. She began promotion for The Dreaming Room by performing "Overcome" on The Graham Norton Show on 29 January and on The Andrew Marr Show on 14 February. On 19 March, Mvula played the first live show of the album at the Jazz Maastricht Festival. On 22 March, she previewed the entire album at the Islington Assembly Hall. On 7 April, the singer released "People" from the album, a collaboration with Wretch 32. On 19 April, she released the second single from The Dreaming Room, "Phenomenal Woman". The third single, "Show Me Love", was released on 27 May.

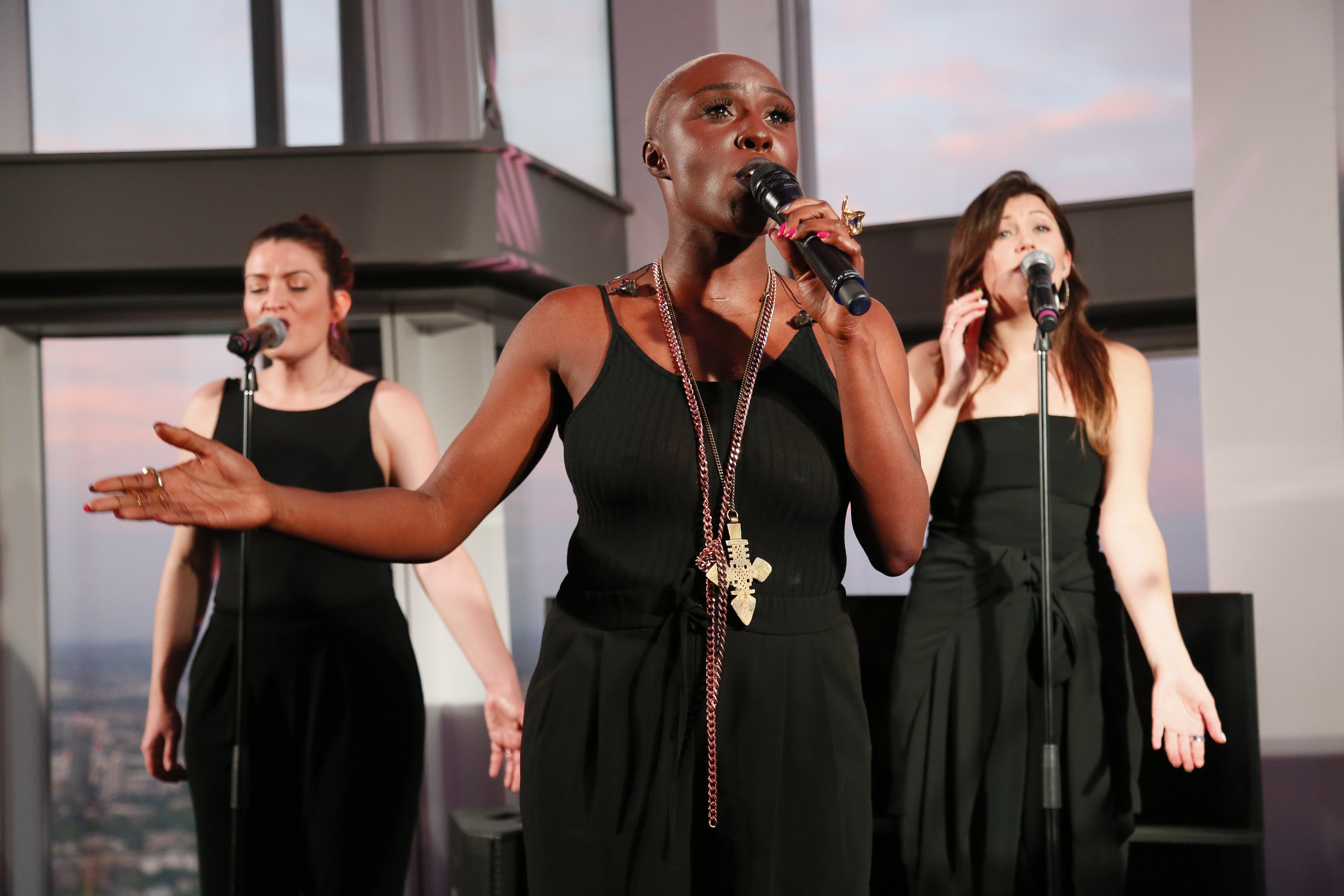
Mvula performing for Global Citizen's #SheWill campaign at The View from The Shard in 2016

The Dreaming Room was released on 17 June 2016, and received universal acclaim from music critics. Writing for Exclaim!, Ryan B. Patrick gave the album a rave review, calling it "a subconscious succession of visuals, emotions and ideas - sometimes abstract, sometimes allegorical, but always dredging up something for the conscious mind to ponder. The Dreaming Room is this and more.". This album is more political than her first; the sound, the orchestration and the rhythms more explicitly refer to her Jamaican and Caribbean influences. The song "Phenomenal Woman" is a happy feminist hymn, inspired by the book of poems of the same title by African-American writer and activist Maya Angelou. The Dreaming Room was produced with Troy Miller and the instrumental crew of the London Symphony Orchestra. In the same June, the singer performed on the Glastonbury Pyramid stage for a second time. In July, she performed with Tom Odell in the first UK event for "Global Citizen" and "Chime For Change", at The View from The Shard in London. This followed the launch of the #SheWill campaign which works to increase female school attendance globally. On 30 October, she appeared on BBC's Strictly Come Dancing singing her fourth single "Ready or Not", the cover of The Delfonics' song, which was released on 4 November. The song was used in 2016 Christmas campaign of House of Fraser. The evening followed the launch of the #SheWill campaign, which aims to break down the barriers that prevent millions of girls worldwide from attending school.

The album was shortlisted for the 2016 Mercury Prize, among others, and in May 2017, won the Ivor Novello award. Mvula was also nominated for four MOBO Awards. In January 2017, Mvula revealed that she had been dropped by Sony. She composed the music for the 2017 Royal Shakespeare Company production of Antony and Cleopatra, which opened at the Royal Shakespeare Theatre, Stratford-upon-Avon, in March and subsequently transferred to the Barbican Centre in November. In April 2017, on BBC Radio 4, she presented a Woman's Hour documentary discussing anxiety.

In April 2018, she performed "I Put a Spell on You" as part of BBC One's The Queen's Birthday Party from the Royal Albert Hall in London. The same year, Mvula and Buika were invited by Carlos Santana to collaborate on his band's album Africa Speaks.

Mvula's "Sing to the Moon" was performed at the 2019 BBC Last Night of the Proms. In that year, she was awarded an Honorary Doctorate by her alma mater, Birmingham City University, for her services to music.

=== 2021: Pink Noise ===
In February 2021, Mvula announced the impending release of new music and a livestream concert on 24 February 2021, titled "Under a Pink Moon". During the livestream, she premiered four new songs taken from her forthcoming album, which was due to be released by Atlantic Records in 2021. The new songs were "Safe Passage", "Conditional", "What Matters" featuring Simon Neil of Biffy Clyro, and "Church Girl". New versions of the songs "Green Garden", "Show Me Love" and "Sing to the Moon" were also performed, and are included on the 1/f EP released the next day. Both Elisa Bray of iNews and Sylvia Unerman of The Upcoming gave the concert five stars 5/5.

The EP released on 25 February includes also a cover of Diana Ross's 1971 hit "I'm Still Waiting". As wrote Nick Levine of BBC America, this mini-album is a "heartening musical comeback" and "showcases an intriguing new direction: Mvula's music is still soulful, but now has balmy '80s beats underpinning her lush melodies. [...] it's a mouthwatering start to her second chapter". Pitchfork's Jessica Kariisa pointed out "daring musicianship".

On 3 March, Mvula released the single "Safe Passage" alongside a video. The second single, "Church Girl", was released on 17 March with details about Mvula's third album, Pink Noise, which was released on 2 July. "Got Me", the third single, was released on 12 May.

== Musical influences ==
When Mvula was a young girl, her great desire was to be a member of the R&B girl group Eternal. In 2013, she said: "I think that is when I really started to pay attention to singing in a different way to the way we did in church." Together with her siblings and encouraged by parents, who personally favoured jazz and traditional gospel, she performed using their garage as a dance studio.

She has stated that her influences include Nina Simone, Jill Scott, Erykah Badu, Lauryn Hill, Des'ree, Omar, Miles Davis, John Coltrane, Ella Fitzgerald, The Jackson 5, and Diana Ross.

== Discography ==
=== Studio albums ===
Title	Details	Peak chart positions										Certifications
Title	Details	UK	UK R&B	AUS	BEL (FL)	DEN	FRA	IRE	NL	NZ	SWI	Certifications
Sing to the Moon	Released: 4 March 2013; Label: RCA; Format: Digital download, CD, 2×CD, 2×LP	9	1	33	26	40	93	15	11	16	15	BPI: Gold
The Dreaming Room	Released: 17 June 2016; Label: RCA; Format: Digital download, CD, LP	21	3	—	52	—	170	23	—	— (Note: The Dreaming Room did not enter the NZ Top 40 Albums Chart, but peaked at number 5 on the NZ Heatseeker Albums chart.)	85	
Pink Noise	Released: 2 July 2021; Label: Atlantic, Flamingo; Format: Digital download, CD, LP	21	1	—	—	—	—	—	—	—	—	
"—" denotes recording that did not chart in that territory.

=== Live albums ===
Title	Details	Peak chart positions		
Title	Details	UK	BEL (FL)	NL
At Abbey Road Studios	with Metropole Orkest; Released: 23 June 2014 (Digital download) 11 August 2014 (CD) 18 August 2014 (LP); Label: RCA; Format: Digital download, CD, LP	61	184	26

=== Soundtrack albums ===
Title	Details
Antony and Cleopatra: Music & Speeches	Released: 2 February 2018; Label: Opus Arte; Format: CD
Everything Now (Soundtrack from the Netflix Series) (with Rupert Cross & Theo Vidgen)	Released: 6 October 2023; Label: Madison Gate Records; Format: Digital download

=== Extended plays ===
Title	Details	Track listing
iTunes Festival: London 2012	Released: 16 September 2012; Label: RCA; Format: Digital download	"Like the Morning Dew" (Live); "Diamonds" (Live); "Let Me Fall" (Live); "Sing to the Moon" (Live)
She	Released: 16 November 2012; Label: RCA; Format: Digital download	"She"; "Like the Morning Dew"; "Can't Live with the World"; "Jump Right Out"
1/f	Released: 25 February 2021; Label: Atlantic; Format: Digital download, streaming	"Sing to the Moon" (1/f version); "Show Me Love" (1/f version); "Green Garden" (1/f version); "I'm Still Waiting" (Diana Ross cover)

=== Singles ===
Title	Year	Peak chart positions							Album
Title	Year	UK	BEL (FL) Tip	DEN	IRE	JPN	NL	RUS	Album
"She"	2012	— (Note: "She" did not enter the UK Singles Chart, but peaked at number 45 on UK Physical Singles Chart.)	—	—	—	—	—	—	Sing to the Moon
"Green Garden"	2013	31	3	40	50	46	74	246	Sing to the Moon
"That's Alright"	2013	—	52	—	—	—	—	—	Sing to the Moon
"She" (re-release)	2013	—	—	—	—	—	—	331	Sing to the Moon
"You Work for Me"	2015	—	—	—	—	—	—	—	The Dreaming Room: Special Edition
"Overcome" (featuring Nile Rodgers)	2016	—	—	—	—	—	—	296	The Dreaming Room
"Phenomenal Woman"	2016	—	—	—	—	—	—	—	The Dreaming Room
"Show Me Love"	2016	—	—	—	—	—	—	—	The Dreaming Room
"Ready or Not"	2016	—	—	—	—	—	—	—	The Dreaming Room: Special Edition
"Brighter Dawn"	2020	—	—	—	—	—	—	—	Non-album single
"Safe Passage"	2021	—	—	—	—	—	—	—	Pink Noise
"Church Girl"	2021	— (Note: "Church Girl" did not enter the UK Singles Chart, but peaked at number 92 on the UK Singles Downloads Chart and number 95 on the UK Singles Sales Chart.)	—	—	—	—	—	—	Pink Noise
"Got Me"	2021	— (Note: "Got Me" did not enter the UK Singles Chart, but peaked at number 65 on the UK Singles Downloads Chart and number 69 on the UK Singles Sales Chart.)	—	—	—	—	—	—	Pink Noise
"I Know What I Know"	2024	—	—	—	—	—	—	—	Non-album single
"—" denotes a single that did not chart or was not released in that territory.

==== Promotional singles ====
Title	Year	Album
"Like the Morning Dew"	2012	Sing to the Moon
"People" (featuring Wretch 32)	2016	The Dreaming Room
"What Matters" (featuring Simon Neil)	2021	Pink Noise

=== Music videos ===
Title	Year	Director(s)
"Green Garden"	2013	Wendy Morgan
"That's Alright"	2013	Wendy Morgan
"She"	2013	Alex Southam
"Overcome" (featuring Nile Rodgers)	2016	Alex Southam
"Phenomenal Woman"	2016	Alex Southam
"Show Me Love"	2016	Damian Willers
"Ready or Not"	2016	Carley Cussen
"Safe Passage"	2021	James Arden
"Church Girl"	2021	Unknown
"Got Me"	2021	Samuel Douek
"What Matters"	2021	Unknown

=== Guest appearances ===
List of songs recorded and released by Laura Mvula for other artists, and/or for other albums
Title	Year	Other artist(s)	Album
"Little Girl Blue"	2013	None	12 Years a Slave
"Sad, Sad World"	2013	Jamie Cullum	Momentum (Deluxe Edition)
"Human Nature"	2013	None	BBC Radio 1's Live Lounge 2013
"Water Under Bridges"	2014	Gregory Porter	Liquid Spirit (Deluxe Edition)
"See-Line Woman"	2014	Jools Holland	Sirens of Song
"Silence is the Way"	2016	Miles Davis and Robert Glasper	Everything's Beautiful
"Mellow Man"	2016	None	BrOTHERHOOD (Music from the Motion Picture)
"New Person, Same Old Mistakes" (Tame Impala cover)	2016	None	BBC Radio 1's Live Lounge 2016
"Venus"	2017	Becca Stevens	Regina
"Well Loved"	2017	Becca Stevens	Regina
"Stay Awake"	2017	None	Jazz Loves Disney 2
"Ocean Wide, Canyon Deep"	2018	Jacob Collier with Metropole Orkest	Djesse Vol. 1
"Reckless" (Australian Crawl cover)	2020	None	Songs For Australia
"Run to Me (Remix)"	2021	Brittany Howard	Jaime (Reimagined)

== Concert tours ==
- Sing to the Moon Tour (2013–2015)
- The Dreaming Room Tour (2016–2017)

== Awards and nominations ==
Year	Organisation	Category	Work	Result	Ref.
2013	BRIT Awards	Critics' Choice Award	Herself	Nominated	
2013	BBC	Sound of 2013	Herself	Fourth	
2013	Mercury Prize	Album of the Year	Sing to the Moon	Nominated	
2013	MOBO Awards	Best Female Act	Herself	Won	
2013	MOBO Awards	Best R&B/Soul Act	Herself	Won	
2013	MOBO Awards	Best Album	Sing to the Moon	Nominated	
2013	NAACP Image Awards	Outstanding World Music Album	Sing to the Moon	Nominated	
2013	Urban Music Awards	Artist of the Year	Herself	Nominated	
2013	Urban Music Awards	Best Female Act	Herself	Won	
2013	Urban Music Awards	Best Newcomer	Herself	Nominated	
2013	Q Awards	Best New Act	Herself	Nominated	
2013	UK Music Video Awards	Best Pop Video - UK	"She"	Nominated	
2013	UK Music Video Awards	Best Music Ad - TV or Online	Sing to the Moon	Won	
2013	MVPA Awards	Best Choreography	"That's Alright"	Nominated	
2014	Brit Awards	British Breakthrough Act	Herself	Nominated	
2014	Brit Awards	British Female Solo Artist	Herself	Nominated	
2014	BET Awards	Best International Act: UK	Herself	Nominated	
2014	Ivor Novello Awards	Best Album	Sing to the Moon	Nominated	
2014	Music Video Festival	Best International Video	"Green Garden"	Won	
2016	MOBO Awards	Best Female Act	Herself	Nominated	
2016	MOBO Awards	Best R&B/Soul Act	Herself	Nominated	
2016	MOBO Awards	Best Album	The Dreaming Room	Nominated	
2016	MOBO Awards	Best Video	"Phenomenal Woman"	Nominated	
2016	UK Music Video Awards	Best Pop Video - UK	"Overcome"	Nominated	
2016	Mercury Prize	Album of the Year	The Dreaming Room	Nominated	
2017	Ivor Novello Awards	Album Award	The Dreaming Room	Won	
2017	Ivor Novello Awards	Best Song Musically and Lyrically	"Overcome"	Nominated	
2017	Jazz FM Awards	Soul Artist of the Year	Herself	Nominated	
2021	Popjustice £20 Music Prize	Best British Pop Single	"Got Me"	Won	
2021	Mercury Prize	Album of the Year	Pink Noise	Nominated	
2022	Ivor Novello Awards	Best Album	Pink Noise	Won	
