= Green Garden (song) =

Single by Laura Mvula

from the album Sing to the Moon
- Released: 22 February 2013
- Recorded: May–August 2012
- Genre: Soul; R&B
- Length: 4:09
- Label: RCA Records; Sony Music Entertainment
- Songwriter(s): Laura Mvula

Laura Mvula singles chronology
"Like the Morning Dew" (2012)	"Green Garden" (2013)	"That's Alright" (2013)

Music video
- "Green Garden" on YouTube

"Green Garden" is a song by British singer Laura Mvula. It was released as the second single from her debut studio album Sing to the Moon (2013). It was released as a digital download in the United Kingdom on 22 February 2013.

== Music video ==
A music video to accompany "Green Garden" was first released onto YouTube on 17 January 2013, at a total length of three minutes and 50 seconds. It was filmed in Southern California at Descanso Gardens in La Cañada Flintridge and the Lincoln Heights neighbourhood of Los Angeles.

== Live performances ==
On 8 February 2013, Mvula performed the song on The Graham Norton Show.

== Critical reception ==
John Robinson of The Guardian gave the song a positive review stating:

"Laura Mvula has a voice like the Queen has a house: classy, and so big she doesn't need to use all of it at once. This very good debut single is duly a masterclass of restraint [...] the minimal, chiming repetitions of the production and Mvula's understated Nina Simone delivery are as much the key to the song's success as the eventual gospel explosion of the chorus."

Heat gave the song four stars out of five, calling it a "soulful tune".

== Track listings ==
Digital download
No.	Title	Length
1.	"Green Garden"	4:09

== Chart performance ==
On 27 February 2013, the song was number 25 on the Official Chart Update. It ultimately debuted at number 32 on 3 March, moving up by one place to 31 a week later. On 28 February 2013, the song entered the Irish Singles Chart at number 77.

=== Weekly charts ===
Chart (2013)	Peak position
Belgium (Ultratip Bubbling Under Flanders)	3
Belgium (Ultratop Flanders Urban)	12
Belgium (Ultratip Bubbling Under Wallonia)	47
Denmark (Tracklisten)	40
Ireland (IRMA)	50
Netherlands (Single Top 100)	74
Russia (Tophit)	246
Scotland (OCC)	42
UK Singles (OCC)	31

=== Year-end charts ===
Chart (2013)	Position
Belgium (Ultratop Flanders Urban)	51

== Release history ==
Region	Date	Format	Label
United Kingdom	22 February 2013	Digital download	RCA Records, Sony Music Entertainment
