= Tim Fain =

American violinist

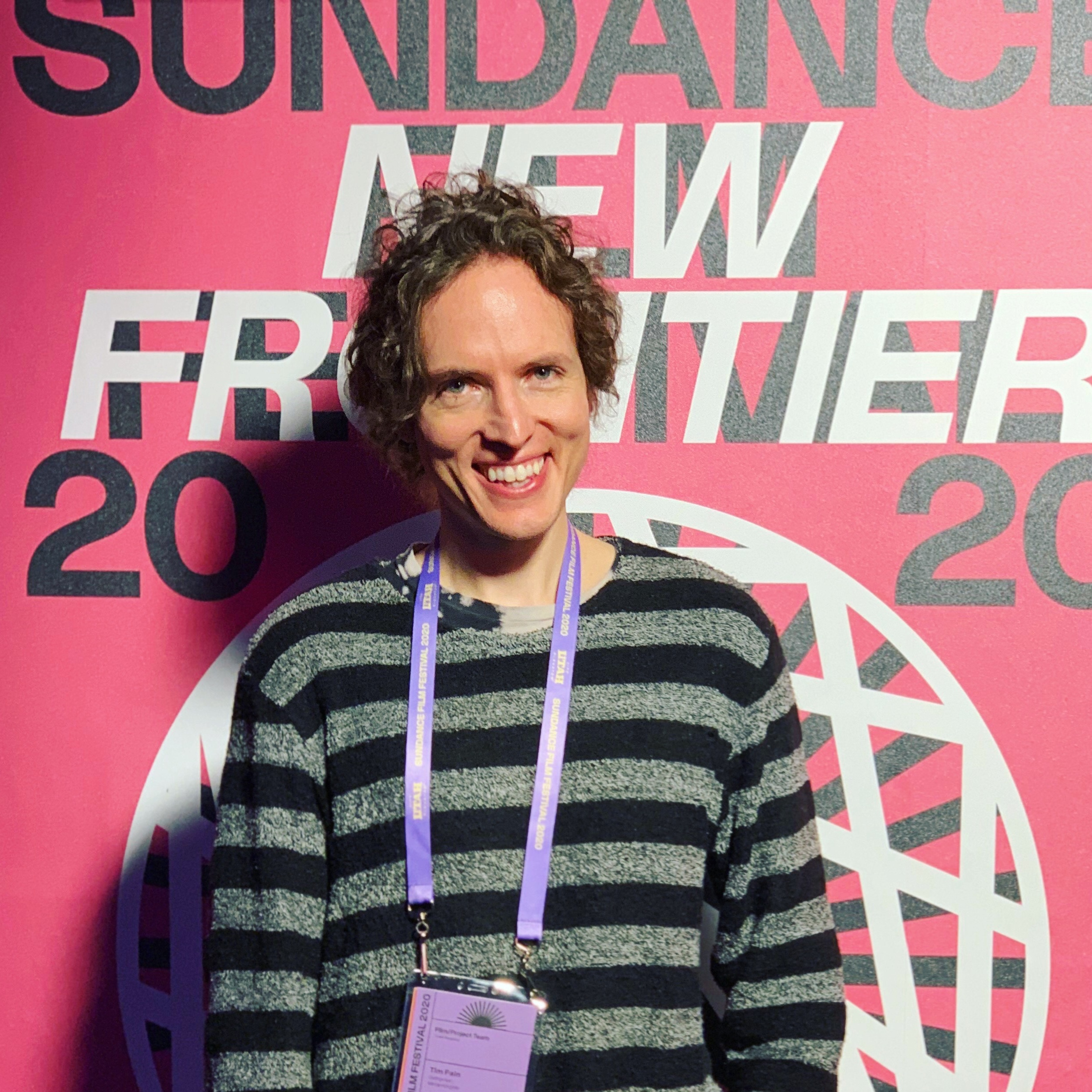
- Tim Fain at Sundance New Frontier 2020

Background information
- Born: Timothy Fain
- Origin: Santa Monica, California, United States
- Occupations: Violinist, Composer, Producer
- Instrument: Violin
- Years active: 1999–present
- Label: Naxos
- Website: www.timfain.com

Tim Fain is an American violinist and composer, best known for his performances in the feature film soundtracks to Black Swan, 12 Years a Slave, and Moonlight, and his work with American composer Philip Glass.

== Early life and education ==
A native of Santa Monica, California, Fain is the son of Gordon and Margery Fain. He began studying violin at age of seven with his father, a neurophysiologist at University of California, Los Angeles, and at age of 10, he performed Beethoven’s Spring Sonata for his fifth-grade classmates.

While living with his family in Cambridge, UK during middle school, Fain studied under Haroutune Bedelian at the Royal Conservatory of Music in London.

After returning to the US for high school, Fain attended Crossroads School for the Arts and Sciences in Santa Monica, continuing violin studies at the Colburn School with Laura Schmieder and privately with Professor Eduard Schmieder.

He received formal higher education in music at the Curtis Institute of Music in Philadelphia and The Juilliard School. where he studied and collaborated under prominent musicians and pedagogues such as Victor Danchenko, Felix Galimir, Richard Goode and Robert Mann.

As a young instrumentalist, Fain launched his career with Young Concert Artists and was awarded the Avery Fisher Career Grant.

== Live performances ==
In 2007, Fain performed Aaron Jay Kernis' violin concerto Lament and Prayer with the Baltimore Symphony Orchestra, conducted by Marin Alsop.

He performed Philip Glass' Concerto No. 2, "The American Four Seasons" with the Pittsburgh Symphony Orchestra, conducted by Christoph König.

Fain reunited in 2006 with musicians from his alma mater, Curtis Symphony Orchestra, to perform Beethoven's Violin Concerto in D Major, conducted by Otto-Werner Mueller in Philadelphia at the Kimmel Center.

Fain was a member of Chamber Music Society of Lincoln Center from 2000 to 2002 and has performed with the society on multiple occasions since.

In 2008, he was a soloist with the Naumburg Orchestral Concerts, in the Naumburg Bandshell, Central Park, in the summer series.

In 2009, Fain was a soloist in Mendelssohn Concerto for Violin and Piano (with Italian pianist Mariangela Vacatello) with iPalpiti orchestra of international laureates/ Eduard Schmieder, conductor, at Walt Disney Concert Hall in Los Angeles. CD was released on BCM+D label.

In 2015 he performed works by Schumann, Lasser, and Bach alongside Simone Dinnerstein at National Sawdust. Fain has performed several other times with Dinnerstein.

In 2015 Fain guest-conducted and performed the solo violin for Max Richter’s Vivaldi Recomposed and Antonio Vivaldi's Four Seasons with the Spanish National Orchestra at the Reina Sofía Museum in Madrid.

Also in 2015, Fain performed for the 14th Dalai Lama on his 80th Birthday at the Peak Mind Foundation Summit.

Fain appeared at the 2019 KIND gala alongside Daily Show host Trevor Noah, performing musical accompaniment to poetry and rap performances by former refugees from the Congo and El Salvador.

In 2017, he performed Philip Glass’s Violin Concerto No. 2, “The American Four Seasons", with the American Composers Orchestra at their 40th Anniversary concert at Carnegie Hall.

Also in 2017, Fain performed at the Vatican.

In 2018, Fain performed Glass’ Double Concerto for Violin and Cello, conducted by Marin Alsop, with cellist Matt Haimovitz at the Cabrillo Festival.

In 2019, Fain performed works by Bach, Glass, and Mozart with cellist Denise Djokic and pianist Andrew Armstrong at the Scotia Festival in Halifax, Nova Scotia.

Fain made his debut with the San Francisco Symphony in April 2023, performing on the orchestra's Soundbox series curated by composer Nicholas Britell and film director Barry Jenkins.

== Work in film ==
Fain did his first work in film ghost-playing for Richard Gere in the Fox Searchlight movie Bee Season in 2005.

In 2010, Fain co-arranged the onscreen music in the movie Black Swan, and also performed featured violin on-camera alongside leading actress Natalie Portman in the film.

Fain has frequently collaborated with composer/pianist Nicholas Britell. He co-arranged and performed the on screen diegetic music in 12 Years A Slave with Britell, and is featured on the soundtrack album Music from and Inspired by 12 Years a Slave. Fain and Britell also collaborated on the soundtrack to Free State of Jones in 2016. Their work together includes Tale of Love and Darkness, and Fain is featured in multiple episodes Season 2 of Succession.

Fain collaborated with Britell once again on the film score and soundtrack for 2016's Moonlight, which won the Academy-Award for Best Picture that year. Fain also joined director and cast members for special performances with Britell at a Moonlight screening and discussion hosted by The New York Times and performed the score live to picture for an event at the Million Dollar Theater in Los Angeles.

Also in 2016, Fain featured on Jay Wadley's score to James Schamus' Indignation.

Fain also contributed featured violin performances to West Dylan Thordson's score for M. Night Shyamalan's 2019 psychological superhero thriller, Glass.

== Work with Philip Glass ==
Fain has toured extensively with composer Philip Glass as a duo partner, and has frequently performed compositions by Glass including works he has written for Fain. He has collaborated with other prominent musicians in performances of Glass’ work, including Iggy Pop, Simone Dinnerstein, Sondre Lerche, Lou Reed, and Bryce Dessner of The National.

Fain has performed music from Glass’ opera, Einstein on the Beach, including in 2013, with pianist Pei-Yao Wang a performance of Knee 2, in recital at the Philadelphia Chamber Music Society. Fain later joined the world tour cast of Einstein on the Beach as “Einstein” for a run of performances in Gwangju, South Korea in 2015.

Fain continues to tour a duo-recital program worldwide with Philip Glass. The recital includes music written by Glass for Fain.

In 2012, Fain performed Philip Glass's Pendulum with pianist Bruce Brubaker at the composer's 75th birthday party concert in New York.

The pair toured together in 2017 on Book of Longing; a production featuring music written by Glass and words by Leonard Cohen.

== Work in music and technology ==
Fain has a strong professional interest in the intersection of music and technology and has created several virtual reality and multimedia works.

In 2011, Fain produced and premiered Portals; a multimedia musical evening which explores connection in the digital age. Portals, in which Fain performs live on stage, features music by Philip Glass, Aaron Jay Kernis, and Kevin Puts, text by Leonard Cohen, choreography by Benjamin Millepied, and performances from Nicholas Britell and radio personality Fred Child. The work has been performed at venues around the world; including Australia's Melbourne Festival, Le Lieu Unique in Nantes, Los Angeles, New York City, and Omaha, and was featured in, among others, Vanity Fair, Vogue, The Wall Street Journal and The New York Times.

In 2016, Fain collaborated with interdisciplinary musician Jacob Marshall of Mae and artist David Lobser to create the first ever VR experience synced to a live performance at Jerusalem’s Tower of David to close the Forbes’ 30 Under 30 Summit.

Fain has released VR violin performances on his YouTube channel, including the Jump VR video Resonance and a 180 VR performance of Philip Glass' "Knee Play 2" from Einstein on The Beach filmed on the coastline of the San Juan Islands.

In 2017, Fain again collaborated with Britell to premiere their multimedia film music recital program “Once Upon a Score” at the Ravinia Festival.

In 2018, Fain composed and performed the music for the VR series Interpretation of Dreams as part of Samsung’s VR pilot season. Each episode of the series re-imagines a case study from Sigmund Freud's 1899 book of the same name.

Fain composed and performed the interactive musical score for Metamorphic, a social VR film experience which premiered at the 2020 Sundance Film Festival.

In 2019, Fain gave a keynote speech at the TED conference in Hieronymus Park in Montana. The presentation was titled "How Virtual Reality Can Help Make Our Stories (and Music!) Better," and examined the future of music and virtual reality.

== Compositions ==
Fain composed the score and performed on the soundtrack to the 2014 documentary Untouchable: Children of God which deals with the lives of two young girls who were rescued from working in Indian brothels.

In 2015, Fain composed Resonance, a short work for violin and orchestra which was used for a Google Jump VR music film directed by Jessica Brillhart. The collaboration with Google, recorded with Eric Jacobsen conducting The Knights, marked YouTube's release of its 360 spatial audio capabilities.

In 2016, he composed Freedom for violin and orchestra, the recording of which was released to raise awareness about modern slavery. Proceeds from sales and downloads of Freedom went toward Made in a Free World, an NGO focused on work in this area.

Fain composed the score to Interpretation of Dreams, a 2018, 4-episode virtual reality series directed by Graham Sack, and distributed by Samsung.

Fain composed and performed the interactive musical score for Metamorphic, a social VR film experience which premiered at the 2020 Sundance Film Festival.

In 2020, Fain performed a duo recital with pianist Simone Dinnerstein at the Bitterroot Performing Arts Center, and also solo recitals at Pro Musica in San Miguel de Allende, Mexico.

Fain released his track Glacial in honor of Earth Day 2020, as a celebration of Earth and a call to action to combat climate change. The track was also used in the Sierra Club's Outdoors for All campaign in 2021.

In 2021, Fain premiered his own violin concerto, Edge of A Dream, with conductor Jacomo Bairos and the Amarillo Symphony.

Fain collaborated with Sleeping at Last on Saturn which was used in a Ralph Lauren ad campaign in April 2022.

== Awards and honors ==
- 2006: Up-and-Coming Young Musicians, Symphony magazine
- Young Concert Artists International Award
- 2007: Avery Fisher Career Grant
- 2007: "Pick of Up and Coming Musicians", The Strad
- 2021: Grantee of the Sundance Film Festival Institute Interdisciplinary Program.

== Discography ==
- Philip Glass: Book of Longing (Orange Mountain Music, 2007)
- Arches: Music Then to Now (Image Recordings, 2008)
- Bee Season: Original Motion Picture Soundtrack, (Nettwerk, 2009)
- Philip Glass: The Concerto Project, Vol. IV, (Orange Mountain Music, 2010)
- The Glass Chamber Players: Schoenberg* / Glass* – Verklärte Nacht Opus 4 / Sextet For Strings, (Orange Mountain Music, 2010)
- Lifeforce: The Music of Joel Harrison, (Orange Mountain Music, 2010)
- Black Swan: Original Motion Picture Soundtrack (Sony, 2011)
- River of Light: American Short Works for Violin and Piano (Naxos, 2011)
- Music from and Inspired by 12 Years a Slave (Columbia Records, 2013)
- "Variation", Tim Fain plays Michael Shapiro's Peace Variations (Paumanok, 2014)
- Tim Fain plays Philip Glass: Partita for solo violin (Orange Mountain Music, 2015)
- "Resonance" (single) (2015)
- First Loves (VIA Records, 2016)
- Moonlight (original motion picture soundtrack) (2016)
- "Freedom" (single) (2016)
- Michael Shapiro: Second Sonata for Violin and Piano, Tim Fain and Steven Beck (Paumanok, 2017)
- Lou Harrison: Violin Concerto, Grand Duo & Double Music (Naxos, 2017)
- Club Diamond: Original Theater Soundtrack (Blind Bay Records, 2019)
- "Glacial" (single) (2020)
