= Indianapolis Chamber Orchestra =

Chamber orchestra in Indianapolis, Indiana, US

- Chamber orchestra
- Former name: Musicians of the Cloister
- Founded: 1984
- Location: Indianapolis
- Concert hall: Howard L. Schrott Center for the Arts; Butler University
- Music director: Matthew Kraemer
- Website: www.icomusic.org

The Indianapolis Chamber Orchestra (ICO) is a nonprofit chamber orchestra headquartered at Butler University in Indianapolis, Indiana. In 2019–2020 it will celebrate its 35th season.

== History ==
The orchestra was founded by musicologist David Urness and originally named "Musicians of the Cloister" after the cloister garden at Trinity Episcopal Church in Indianapolis. Urness modeled ICO after the Academy of St Martin in the Fields.

The orchestra was incorporated in 1985 and adopted its current name in 1987. In 2004 the orchestra merged with Indianapolis Youth Wind Ensemble as part of an ongoing outreach program.

The 1985 concert season featured performances at Indiana Repertory Theatre. During the 1986–87 season, the orchestra performed at the Indianapolis Museum of Art. Then in 1988, the orchestra moved to Clowes Memorial Hall at Butler University.

Currently the orchestra performs at Howard L. Schrott Center for the Arts.

Music director Kirk Trevor joined the ICO in 1988 and retired at the end of the 2014–15 season.

In July 2015, Matthew Kraemer was named as music director and principal conductor.
