= Sing to the Moon =

2013 studio album by Laura Mvula

Studio album by Laura Mvula
- Released: 1 March 2013
- Recorded: 2011–2012
- Genre: Soul; neo soul; R&B
- Length: 49:36
- Label: RCA Victor
- Producer: Steve Brown

Laura Mvula chronology
Sing to the Moon (2013)	The Dreaming Room (2016)

Singles from Sing to the Moon
- 1. "She" Released: 29 October 2012; 2. "Green Garden" Released: 22 February 2013; 3. "That's Alright" Released: 28 March 2013

Sing to the Moon is the debut studio album by English singer Laura Mvula. It was released on 1 March 2013 by RCA Victor. The album includes the singles "She" and "Green Garden". The album debuted at number nine on the UK Albums Chart. It was nominated for the 2013 Mercury Prize.

On 11 August 2014, Mvula released an orchestral version of the entire album 'Sing to the Moon' which she recorded at Abbey Road Studios accompanied by the Metropole Orkest.

== Inspiration ==
In 2013, during an interview with Blues and Soul magazine, Mvula revealed that the inspiration behind her song "Sing to the Moon" came from a biography of the American jazz singer Adelaide Hall titled Underneath a Harlem Moon: The Harlem to Paris Years of Adelaide Hall written by Iain Cameron Williams.

Well, the actual song "Sing to the Moon" came from a time when I was reading a book called 'Underneath a Harlem Moon', which is a biography of a jazz singer called Adelaide Hall, which is basically all about how she kind of was overlooked, or probably didn’t get the recognition she perhaps deserved. Plus it also talks about how she’d had a hard time growing up because her sister - who she was very close to - had died tragically of an illness... So anyway, there's a point in the story where she describes her close relationship with her father… which I think kind of resonated with me, where she talks about the conversations she had with him and how he used to say to her randomly 'Sing to the moon and the stars will shine'. Which kind of became her thing really that she just took with her everywhere. … And I don't know why, but for some reason it just struck some kind of chord with me - you know, it was just something I seemed to connect with at that time. And so because of that, it then became a saying that I liked to use myself. So yeah, because it's become something I personally like to express, I just thought Sing to the Moon would also make a good title for the album as a whole.

== History ==
=== Singles ===
Several of the album's singles were released before the album came out in March 2013. "She" was released as the lead single from the album on 29 October 2012. It was released both as a standalone single and as part of the She EP which contained three other songs ("Like the Morning Dew", "Can't Live with the World" and "Jump Right Out"). "She" was re-released on 16 August 2013 as an EP containing a new "2013 Edit" of the song and five other remixes.

"Green Garden" was released as the second single from the album on 22 February 2013. The song peaked at number thirty-one on the UK Singles Chart. It has also charted in Belgium, Denmark, Ireland and the Netherlands. "That's Alright" was released as the third single in March 2013.

=== Release ===
Sing to the Moon was released on 1 March 2013 by RCA Victor. The album debuted at number nine on the UK Albums Chart with first-week sales of 18,954 copies. The individual song "Sing to the Moon" was sampled by rapper XXXTentacion and used in his song "Vice City".

=== National Album Day 2019 ===
Sing to the Moon was chosen by critic Lyle Bignon to represent Sounds of the Midlands for National Album Day, 2019, accompanied by an exhibition staged at various Railway stations across the UK.

== Reception ==
=== Critical ===
Professional ratings
Aggregate scores
Source	Rating
AnyDecentMusic?	7.2/10
Metacritic	73/100
Review scores
Source	Rating
AllMusic	3.5/5 stars
The Daily Telegraph	4/5 stars
The Guardian	4/5 stars
The Independent	5/5 stars
The Irish Times	4/5 stars
NME	5/10
Pitchfork	7.4/10
Q	3/5 stars
Rolling Stone	3.5/5 stars
Spin	7/10

The album met with a largely positive reception, receiving a perfect score from The Independent, and 3.5/5 from Rolling Stone. AllMusic stated the album is "rooted in decades-old forms of gospel, jazz, R&B, and, most deeply, orchestral pop. Almost all of the material is as serious and as refined as it is majestic, with vocal showcases and hushed-belted-hushed-belted dynamics galore."

=== Commercial ===
The album debuted at number nine on the UK Albums Chart with first-week sales of 18,954 copies.

In the United States, the album first entered the R&B Albums chart at No. 19 for chart dated May 4, 2013, and it reached No. 8 on the chart a month later. It also peaked at No. 173 on the Billboard 200. The album has sold 32,000 copies in the US as of April 2016.

== Track listing ==
No.	Title	Writer(s)	Producer(s)	Length
1.	"Like the Morning Dew"	Laura Mvula; Steve Brown	Brown	3:42
2.	"Make Me Lovely"	Mvula	Brown	4:40
3.	"Green Garden"	Mvula	Brown	4:11
4.	"Can't Live With the World"	Mvula; Brown	Brown	6:07
5.	"Is There Anybody Out There?"	Mvula; Brown	Brown	5:13
6.	"Father, Father"	Mvula; Brown	Brown	4:44
7.	"That's Alright"	Mvula	Brown	3:36
8.	"She"	Mvula; Brown	Brown	3:28
9.	"I Don't Know What the Weather Will Be"	Mvula; Brown	Brown	3:32
10.	"Sing to the Moon"	Mvula; Brown	Brown	4:09
11.	"Flying Without You"	Mvula; Brown	Brown	3:23
12.	"Diamonds"	Mvula; Brown	Brown	3:16
Total length:				50:05

iTunes Bonus Track
No.	Title	Writer(s)	Producer(s)	Length
13.	"Unbelievable Dream"	Mvula; Brown	Brown	3:26
Total length:				53:32

Deluxe Edition Bonus Tracks
No.	Title	Writer(s)	Producer(s)	Length
13.	"Jump Right Out"	Mvula; Brown	Brown	4:12
14.	"Something Out of the Blue"	Stevie Wonder; Syreeta Wright	Brown	2:42
15.	"Father, Father" (Live for Hunger TV)	Mvula; Brown	Helen Atkinson	3:21
16.	"Diamonds" (Live for Hunger TV)	Mvula; Brown	Ben Baptie; Joe Visciano	4:02
17.	"Green Garden 1" (Demo)	Mvula		1:55
18.	"She 1" (Demo)	Mvula; Brown		2:44
Total length:				69:06

Spotify Bonus Track
No.	Title	Writer(s)	Length
19.	"Green Garden" (Dave Invisible Remix)	Mvula	6:05
Total length:			75:11

Japan Bonus Tracks
No.	Title	Writer(s)	Length
19.	"Take the Time"	Mvula; Brown	2:53
20.	"Green Garden" (Dave Invisible Remix)	Mvula	6:05
Total length:			78:04

== Charts ==
=== Weekly charts ===
Weekly chart performance for Sing to the Moon
Chart (2013)	Peak position
Australian Albums (ARIA)	33
Belgian Albums (Ultratop Flanders)	26
Belgian Albums (Ultratop Wallonia)	68
Danish Albums (Hitlisten)	40
Dutch Albums (Album Top 100)	11
French Albums (SNEP)	93
Irish Albums (IRMA)	15
New Zealand Albums (RMNZ)	16
Scottish Albums (OCC)	15
Swiss Albums (Schweizer Hitparade)	15
UK Albums (OCC)	9
UK R&B Albums (OCC)	1
US Billboard 200	173
US Heatseekers Albums (Billboard)	3
US Top R&B/Hip-Hop Albums (Billboard)	21

=== Year-end charts ===
Year-end chart performance for Sing to the Moon
Chart (2013)	Position
Belgian Albums (Ultratop Flanders)	176

== Release history ==
Region	Date	Format(s)	Label
Ireland	1 March 2013	CD, digital download	RCA Victor
United Kingdom	4 March 2013	CD, digital download	RCA Victor
Denmark	4 March 2013	CD, digital download	Sony Music
Australia	15 March 2013	CD, digital download	Sony Music
Germany	5 April 2013	CD, digital download	Sony Music
United States	16 April 2013	Digital download	Columbia Records
United States	14 May 2013	CD	Columbia Records
France	3 June 2013	CD, digital download	Sony Music
Japan	5 June 2013	CD, digital download	Sony Music

== Orchestral version ==
Laura Mvula with Metropole Orkest conducted by Jules Buckley at Abbey Road Studios

Studio album
- Released: June 23, 2014 (digital download); August 11, 2014 (CD); August 18, 2014 (LP)
- Recorded: 2014
- Studio: Abbey Road Studios
- Genre: R&B; soul; Neo soul
- Label: RCA
- Producer: Metropole Orchestra

In March 2014, Mvula re-recorded an orchestral version of her debut album Sing to the Moon in collaboration with all 52 members of the Metropole Orchestra. Conducted by Jules Buckley, the orchestral version of Sing to the Moon was recorded over two days and saw its release on 23 June 2014 as a high quality download via Bowers & Wilkins' Society of Sound. The album was released to the public on 11 August 2014.

=== Track listing ===
No.	Title	Length
1.	"Make Me Lovely"	5:51
2.	"Like the Morning Dew"	3:38
3.	"Can't Live with the World"	5:38
4.	"Sing to the Moon"	4:23
5.	"Is There Anybody out There?"	5:16
6.	"Flying Without You"	3:49
7.	"She"	4:05
8.	"Father, Father"	6:19
9.	"I Don't Know What the Weather Will Be"	3:55
10.	"Green Garden"	4:12
11.	"Diamonds"	3:31
12.	"That's Alright"	3:26

== Snarky Puppy version ==
"Sing to the Moon" was reworked and recorded with Snarky Puppy for the album Family Dinner - Volume 2 released February 12, 2016.
