= 1938 in music =

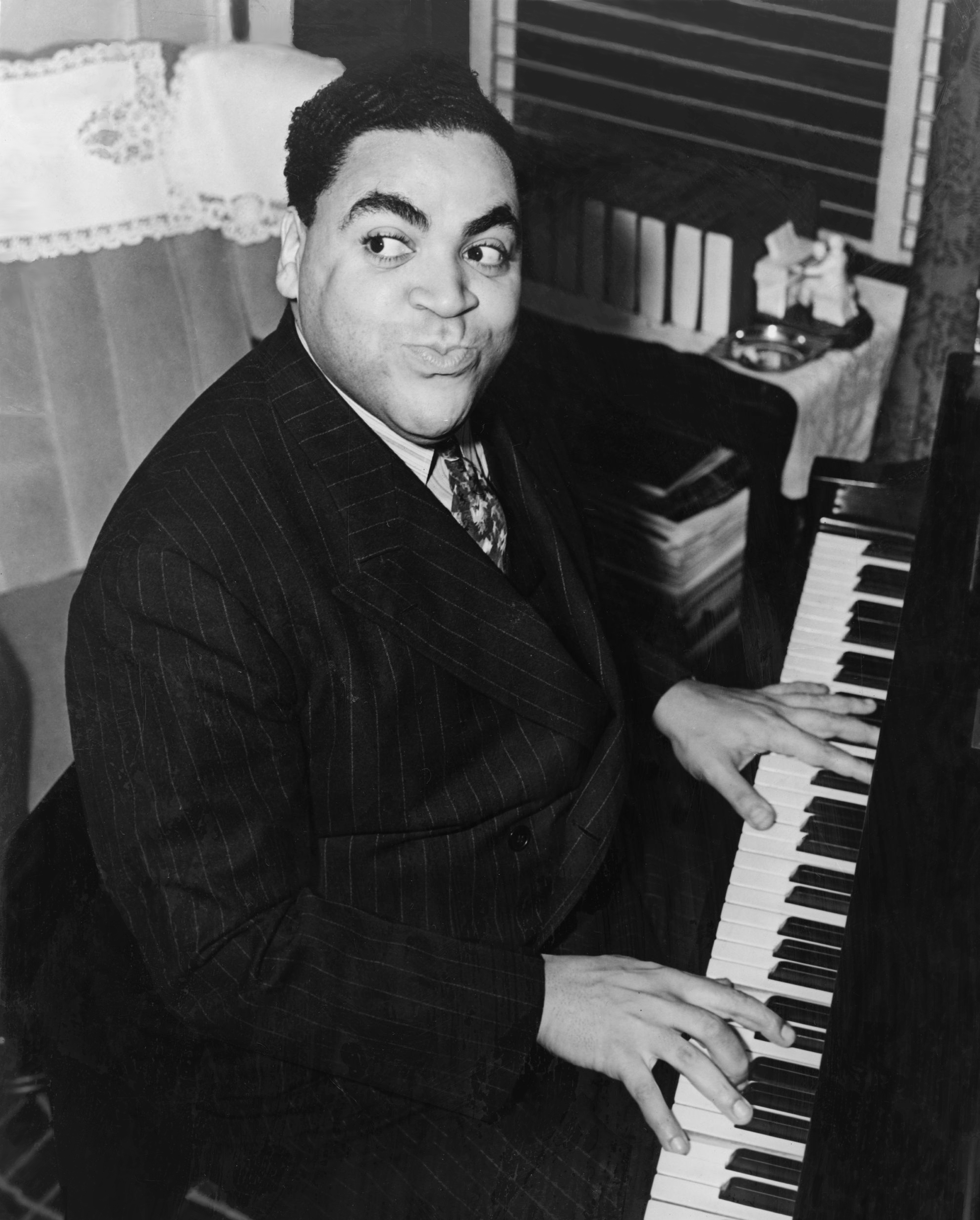
Composer and jazz pianist Fats Waller in 1938

This is a list of notable events in music that took place in the year 1938.

== Specific locations ==
- 1938 in British music
- 1938 in Norwegian music

== Specific genres ==
- 1938 in country music
- 1938 in jazz

== Events ==
- January 16
  - Benny Goodman plays the first jazz concert at Carnegie Hall in New York City, considered a legitimisation of the genre. It is recorded live and issued in 1950 as The Famous 1938 Carnegie Hall Jazz Concert.
  - Béla Bartók's Sonata for two pianos and percussion is premièred in Basel.
  - First recording of Mahler's Symphony No. 9, a live performance by the Vienna Philharmonic conducted by Bruno Walter at the Musikverein, the same location, conductor and orchestra that had presented the première 26 years earlier, but now in the face of the Anschluss.
- May 12 – Arthur Honegger's oratorio Jeanne d'Arc au Bûcher is premièred in Basel, with Ida Rubinstein as Jeanne.
- June 5 – Glenn Gould plays in public for the first time at a church service held at the Business Men's Bible Class in Uxbridge, Ontario to a congregation of about two thousand people.
- September 22 – Anton Webern's String Quartet is premièred in Pittsfield, Massachusetts.
- October 5 – Ralph Vaughan Williams' Serenade to Music is premièred at the Royal Albert Hall in London to mark the 50th anniversary of conductor Henry Wood's first concert.
- October 31 – Sister Rosetta Tharpe makes her first recording.
- December 17 – Consolidated Film Industries, Inc. consummates the sale of its subsidiary American Record Corp. to Columbia Broadcasting on December 17, 1938, for a reported price of $700,000. American Record embraces the Brunswick, Vocalion and Columbia labels.
- December 30 – The ballet Romeo and Juliet (with music by Prokofiev) receives its first full performance, at the Mahen Theatre in Brno, Czechoslovakia.
- unknown dates
- English composer Ralph Vaughan Williams begins an affair with writer Ursula Wood; they will marry in 1953.
- Roy Acuff and the Crazy Tennesseans win a contract with the Grand Ole Opry.
- Jelly Roll Morton speaks, sings and plays piano for an eight-hour Library of Congress recorded sound documentary produced by Alan Lomax.
- Italian performer Fred Buscaglione and songwriter Leo Chiosso meet.
- John Serry Sr. appears with Shep Fields in Paramount Pictures' film extravaganza The Big Broadcast of 1938 and with Pietro Deiro for an "Accordion Jamfest" at the Stevens Hotel in Chicago.
- The Roman Catholic hymnal Kirchenlied is first published in Germany.

== Albums released ==
- Carnegie Hall Jazz Concert – Benny Goodman

== Top popular recordings ==
The twenty popular records listed below were extracted from Joel Whitburn's Pop Memories 1890–1954, record sales reported on the "Discography of American Historical Recordings" website, and other sources as specified. Numerical rankings are approximate, they are only used as a frame of reference.

Rank	Artist	Title	Label	Recorded	Released	Chart positions<
1	Chick Webb Orchestra (vocal Ella Fitzgerald)	"A-Tisket, A-Tasket"	Decca 1840	May 2, 1938	June 1938	US Billboard 1938 #1, US #1 for 10 weeks, 19 total weeks, Grammy Hall of Fame 1986, 250,000 sales
2	Larry Clinton and His Orchestra (Vocal Bea Wain)	"My Reverie"	Victor 26006	July 16, 1938	August 3, 1938	US Billboard 1938 #2, US #1 for 8 weeks, 19 total weeks, 100,000 sales
3	Tommy Dorsey and His Orchestra (vocal Edythe Wright)	"Music, Maestro, Please"	Victor 25866	May 12, 1938	June 8, 1938	US Billboard 1938 #3, US #1 for 6 weeks, 20 total weeks
4	Artie Shaw and his Orchestra	"Begin the Beguine"	Bluebird 7746	July 24, 1938	August 17, 1938	US Billboard 1938 #4, US #1 for 6 weeks, 18 total weeks, Grammy Hall of Fame 1977, National Recording Registry 2012, Jazz Standards 1935
5	Horace Heidt And His Brigadiers	"Ti-Pi-Tin"	Brunswick 8078	February 11, 1938	March 1938	US Billboard 1938 #5, US #1 for 6 weeks, 13 total weeks
6	Benny Goodman and His Orchestra	"Don't Be That Way"	Victor 25792	February 16, 1938	March 2, 1938	US Billboard 1938 #6, US #1 for 5 weeks, 13 total weeks, Grammy Hall of Fame 1987
7	The Andrews Sisters	"Bei Mir Bistu Shein"	Decca 1562	November 24, 1937	December 1937	US Billboard 1938 #7, US #1 for 5 weeks, 10 total weeks, Grammy Hall of Fame 1996, National Recording Registry 2008, 100,000 sales, 100,000 sales
8	Larry Clinton and His Orchestra (Vocal Bea Wain)	"Cry, Baby, Cry"	Victor 25819	March 31, 1938	April 13, 1938	US Billboard 1938 #8, US #1 for 4 weeks, 25 total weeks
9	Bing Crosby	"I've Got A Pocketful Of Dreams"	Decca 1562	July 11, 1937	July 1937	US Billboard 1938 #9, US #1 for 4 weeks, 17 total weeks
10	Shep Fields and His Rippling Rhythm Orchestra	"Thanks for the Memory"	Bluebird 7318	November 29, 1937	December 1937	US Billboard 1938 #10, US #1 for 4 weeks, 14 total weeks, Jazz Standards 1938
11	Red Norvo and His Orchestra (Vocal Mildred Bailey)	"Says My Heart"	Brunswick 8135	April 19, 1938	May 1938	US Billboard 1938 #11, US #1 for 4 weeks, 12 total weeks
12	Duke Ellington and His Famous Orchestra	"I Let a Song Go Out of My Heart"	Brunswick 8108	March 3, 1938	March 1938	US Billboard 1938 #12, US #1 for 3 weeks, 19 total weeks
13	Sammy Kaye and His Orchestra	"Love Walked In"	Vocalion 4017	March 20, 1938	April 1938	US Billboard 1938 #13, US #1 for 3 weeks, 16 total weeks
14	Shep Fields and His Rippling Rhythm Orchestra	"Cathedral in the Pines"	Bluebird 7533	April 20, 1938	May 4, 1938	US Billboard 1938 #14, US #1 for 3 weeks, 10 total weeks
15	Red Norvo and His Orchestra (Vocal Mildred Bailey)	"Please Be Kind"	Brunswick 8088	February 10, 1938	March 1938	US Billboard 1938 #15, US #1 for 2 weeks, 16 total weeks
16	Sammy Kaye and His Orchestra	"Rosalie"	Vocalion 4017	September 7, 1938	October 1938	US Billboard 1938 #16, US #1 for 2 weeks, 15 total weeks
17	Russ Morgan and His Orchestra	"I've Got a Pocketful of Dreams"	Decca 1936	July 7, 1938	August 1938	US Billboard 1938 #17, US #1 for 2 weeks, 13 total weeks
18	Jimmy Dorsey and His Orchestra	"Change Partners"	Decca 2002	July 29, 1938	September 1938	US Billboard 1938 #18, US #1 for 2 weeks, 12 total weeks
19	Andy Kirk and His Twelve Clouds of Joy	"I Won't Tell a Soul (I Love You)"	Decca 2127	September 2, 1938	October 1938	US Billboard 1938 #19, US #1 for 2 weeks, 12 total weeks
20	Bing Crosby	"You Must Have Been a Beautiful Baby"	Decca 2147	October 14, 1938	November 1938	US Billboard 1938 #20, US #1 for 2 weeks, 11 total weeks
21	Bing Crosby and Connee Boswell	"Alexander's Ragtime Band"	Decca 1887	January 26, 1938	March 1938	US Billboard 1938 #21, US #1 for 2 weeks, 11 total weeks
22	Fats Waller and his Rhythm	"Two Sleepy People"	Bluebird 10000	October 13, 1938	November 2, 1938	US Billboard 1938 #22, US #1 for 2 weeks, 11 total weeks
23	Fred Astaire	"Change Partners"	Brunswick 8189	March 24, 1938	July 1938	US Billboard 1938 #23, US #1 for 2 weeks, 8 total weeks
24	Fred Astaire	"Nice Work if You Can Get It"	Brunswick 7983	October 17, 1937	November 1937	US Billboard 1938 #24, US #1 for 1 weeks, 15 total weeks, Jazz Standards 1937
25	Larry Clinton and His Orchestra	"Heart and Soul"	Victor 26046	September 1, 1938	September 21, 1938	US Billboard 1938 #25, US #1 for 1 weeks, 14 total weeks, Jazz Standards 1938

=== Top Christmas hits ===
- "Don't Wait 'Till The Night Before Christmas" – Eddy Duchin and His Orchestra

== Top blues records ==
- "Sunnyland" – Sonny Boy Williamson

== Published popular music ==
- "And the Angels Sing" words: Johnny Mercer, music: Ziggy Elman
- "At Long Last Love" w.m. Cole Porter
- "At The Roxy Music Hall" w. Lorenz Hart m. Richard Rodgers
- "Back Bay Shuffle" m. Artie Shaw & Teddy McRae
- "Be A Good Scout" w. Harold Adamson m. Jimmy McHugh Introduced by Deanna Durbin in the film That Certain Age
- "Big Noise From Winnetka" w.m. Ray Bauduc, Bob Crosby, Bob Haggart & Gil Rodin
- "The Biggest Aspidistra In The World" w.m. Thomas Connor, W. G. Haines & James S. Hancock
- "Bolero at the Savoy" w.m. Charles Carpenter, Gene Krupa & James Mundy
- "Boum!" w.m. E. Ray Goetz & Charles Trenet
- "Boomps-A-Daisy" w.m. Annette Mills
- "Boum!" w.m. Charles Trenet
- "Change Partners" w.m. Irving Berlin introduced by Fred Astaire in Carefree
- "Cherokee" m. Ray Noble
- "Cinderella, Stay In My Arms" w. Jimmy Kennedy m. Michael Carr
- "Colorado Sunset" w. L. Wolfe Gilbert m. Con Conrad
- "Daydreaming (All Night Long)" w. Johnny Mercer m. Harry Warren. Introduced by Rudy Vallée in the film Gold Diggers in Paris.
- "Dearest Love" w.m. Noël Coward
- "Deep In A Dream" w. Eddie DeLange m. Jimmy Van Heusen
- "Do You Wanna Jump Children?" w.m. Jimmy Van Heusen, Willie Bryant & Victor Selsman
- "Doin' the Jive" m.w. Glenn Miller & Chummy MacGregor
- "Don't Be That Way" w. Mitchell Parish m. Edgar Sampson & Benny Goodman
- "Don't Let That Moon Get Away" w. Johnny Burke m. James V. Monaco
- "Don't Worry 'Bout Me" w. Ted Koehler m. Rube Bloom
- "Double Trouble" w. Leo Robin m. Ralph Rainger & Richard A. Whiting
- "Exhibition Swing" m. Chalmers Wood
- "F.D.R. Jones" w.m. Harold Rome. Introduced by Rex Ingram in the revue Sing Out the News.
- "Falling In Love With Love" w. Lorenz Hart m. Richard Rodgers. Introduced by Muriel Angelus in the musical The Boys from Syracuse. Performed in the 1940 film by Allan Jones.
- "Ferdinand the Bull" w. Larry Morey m. Albert Hay Malotte. Performed by Sterling Holloway in the animated film of the same name.
- "Flat Foot Floogie (with a Floy Floy)" w.m. Slim Gaillard, Slam Stewart & Bud Green
- "Get Out of Town" w.m. Cole Porter from the musical Leave It to Me!
- "Hawaiian War Chant" w. (Eng) Ralph Freed m. Johnny Noble & Prince Leleiohaku
- "Heart And Soul" w. Frank Loesser m. Hoagy Carmichael
- "Hi-Yo Silver" Erickson, De Leath
- "Hold Tight – Hold Tight" w.m. Leonard Kent, Edward Robinson, Leonard Ware, Jerry Brandow & Willie Spotswood
- "Hong Kong Blues" w.m. Hoagy Carmichael
- "Hooray for Hollywood" w. Johnny Mercer m. Richard A. Whiting
- "I Can Dream, Can't I?" w. Irving Kahal m. Sammy Fain. Performed by Tamara in the 1938 musical Right This Way
- "I Hadn't Anyone Till You" w.m. Ray Noble
- "I Have Eyes" w. Leo Robin m. Ralph Rainger
- "I Let a Song Go Out of My Heart" w. Henry Nemo, John Redmond & Irving Mills m. Duke Ellington
- "I Love To Whistle" Harold Adamson, Jimmy McHugh
- "I Married An Angel" w. Lorenz Hart m. Richard Rodgers
- "I Must See Annie Tonight" w.m. Cliff Friend & Dave Franklin
- "I'll Be Seeing You" w. Irving Kahal m. Sammy Fain
- "I'll Tell the Man in the Street" w. Lorenz Hart m. Richard Rodgers. Introduced by Vivienne Segal and Walter Slezak in the musical I Married an Angel. Performed in the film version by Nelson Eddy.
- "I'm Gonna Lock My Heart" w. Jimmy Eaton m. Terry Shand
- "I'm In Love With Vienna" w. Oscar Hammerstein II m. Johann Strauss II
- "In A Little Toy Sailboat" Mandell, Littau
- "In My Little Red Book" w.m. Ray Bloch, Nat Simon & Al Stillman.
- "I've Got a Pocketful of Dreams" w. Johnny Burke m. James V. Monaco
- "Jeepers Creepers" w. Johnny Mercer m. Harry Warren. Introduced by Louis Armstrong in the film Going Places.
- "Joseph! Joseph!" w.(Eng) Sammy Cahn & Saul Chaplin m. Nellie Casman & Samuel Steinberg
- "Jumpin' at the Woodside" m. Count Basie
- "Just Let Me Look at You" w. Dorothy Fields m. Jerome Kern. Introduced by Irene Dunne in the film Joy of Living
- "Knees Up Mother Brown" w.m. Harris Weston & Bert Lee
- "Love Walked In" w. Ira Gershwin m. George Gershwin
- "March of the Bob Cats" m. The Bob Cats
- "Mister Crosby And Mister Mercer" w. Johnny Mercer m. Ed Gallagher & Al Shean
- "Moments Like This" w. Frank Loesser m. Burton Lane. Introduced by Florence George in the film College Swing.
- "Most Gentlemen Don't Like Love" w.m. Cole Porter. Introduced by Sophie Tucker in the musical Leave It to Me!
- "Music, Maestro, Please" w. Herb Magidson m. Allie Wrubel
- "My Heart Belongs to Daddy" w.m. Cole Porter. Introduced by Mary Martin in the musical Leave It to Me!. Miss Martin also performed it in the 1946 film Night and Day. Marilyn Monroe sang the song in the 1960 film Let's Make Love.
- "My Heart Is Taking Lessons" w. Johnny Burke m. James V. Monaco. Introduced by Bing Crosby in the film Doctor Rhythm
- "My Heaven On Earth" w. Charles Tobias m. Phil Baker & Samuel Pokrass. Introduced by Gertrude Niesen in the film Start Cheering
- "My Own" w. Harold Adamson m. Jimmy McHugh from the film That Certain Age
- "My Reverie" w.m. Larry Clinton
- "Nice People" w.m. Nat Mills & Fred Malcolm
- "Nightmare" m. Artie Shaw
- "Now it Can Be Told" w.m. Irving Berlin
- "Oh! Ma-Ma!" w. (Eng) Lew Brown & Rudy Vallée m. Paolo Citorello
- "One Day When We Were Young" w. Oscar Hammerstein II m. Johann Strauss II arr. Tiomkin
- "The One I Love Will Come Along Some Day" w. Gus Kahn m. Bronislaw Kaper & Walter Jurmann. Introduced by Allan Jones in the film Everybody Sing
- "Paradise In The Moonlight" w.m. Gene Autry & Fred Rose from the film Western Jamboree
- "Penny Serenade" w. Hal Halifax m. Melle Weersma
- "Please Be Kind" w.m. Sammy Cahn & Saul Chaplin
- "Ride, Tenderfoot, Ride" w. Johnny Mercer m. Richard A. Whiting
- "Rockin' The Town" w. Ted Koehler m. Johnny Green from the film Start Cheering
- "San Antonio Rose" m. Bob Wills
- "Says My Heart" w. Frank Loesser m. Burton Lane. Introduced by Harriet Hilliard with Harry Owens & his Orchestra in the film Cocoanut Grove
- "Sent for You Yesterday, and Here You Come Today" w.m. Count Basie, Eddie Durham & Jimmy Rushing
- "September Song" w. Maxwell Anderson m. Kurt Weill
- "Shadows on the Moon" w. Gus Kahn m. Sigmund Romberg from the film The Girl Of The Golden West
- "Sing for Your Supper" w. Lorenz Hart m. Richard Rodgers. Introduced by Marcy Westcott, Muriel Angelus and Wynn Murray in the musical The Boys from Syracuse. Performed in the 1940 film by Martha Raye.
- "Small Fry" w. Frank Loesser m. Hoagy Carmichael. Introduced by Bing Crosby, Fred MacMurray and Donald O'Connor in the film Sing You Sinners.
- "Sold American" m. Glenn Miller & Chummy MacGregor
- "Spring Is Here" w. Lorenz Hart m. Richard Rodgers. Introduced by Dennis King and Vivienne Segal in the musical I Married an Angel
- "Start Cheering" w. Milton Drake m. Ben Oakland. Introduced by Gertrude Niesen in the film Start Cheering.
- "The Stately Homes Of England" w.m. Noël Coward
- "Thanks for the Memory" w. Leo Robin m. Ralph Rainger
- "That Certain Age" w. Harold Adamson m. Jimmy McHugh from the film That Certain Age
- "This Can't Be Love" w. Lorenz Hart m. Richard Rodgers
- "This Is My Night To Dream" w. Johnny Burke m. James V. Monaco
- "Ti-Pi-Tin" w. (English) Raymond Leveen, w. (Spanish) María Grever, m. María Grever
- "Two Sleepy People" w. Frank Loesser m. Hoagy Carmichael
- "The Umbrella Man" w. James Cavanaugh m. Vincent Rose & Larry Stock
- "Undecided" w. Sid Robin m. Charlie Shavers
- "We're Off to See the Wizard" w. E. Y. Harburg m. Harold Arlen
- "When I Strut Away In My Cutaway" w.m. Jimmy Durante from the film Start Cheering
- "Where Are the Songs We Sung?" w.m. Noël Coward
- "Where the Dog Sits on the Tuckerbox" w.m. Jack O'Hagan
- "While a Cigarette Was Burning" w.m. Charles Kenny & Nick Kenny
- "Who Are We to Say? (Obey Your Heart)" w. Gus Kahn m. Sigmund Romberg from the film The Girl Of The Golden West
- "You Couldn't Be Cuter" w. Dorothy Fields m. Jerome Kern Introduced by Irene Dunne in the film Joy of Living
- "You Go To My Head" w. Haven Gillespie m. J. Fred Coots
- "You Leave Me Breathless" w. Ralph Freed m. Friedrich Hollaender. Introduced by Fred MacMurray in the film Cocoanut Grove.
- "You Must Have Been A Beautiful Baby" w. Johnny Mercer m. Harry Warren
- "You're A Sweet Little Headache" w. Leo Robin m. Ralph Rainger
- "You're As Pretty As A Picture" w. Harold Adamson m. Jimmy McHughfrom the film That Certain Age
- "You're What's The Matter With Me" w.m. Jimmy Kennedy and Michael Carr. Introduced by Harry Richman and Evelyn Dall in the film Kicking the Moon Around.

== Classical music ==
=== Premieres ===
Composer	Composition	Date	Location	Performers
Barber, Samuel	Adagio for Strings	1938-11-05	New York City	NBC Symphony – Toscanini
Britten, Benjamin	Piano Concerto	1938-08-18	London (BBC Proms)	Britten / BBC Symphony – Wood
Bush, Alan	Piano Concerto, with baritone and chorus	1938-03-04	London	Bush, Noble / BBC Symphony – Boult
Copland, Aaron	An Outdoor Overture	1938-12-16	New York City	High School of Music & Art Orchestra, Alexander Richter (conductor)
Copland, Aaron	Signature	1938-02-23	New York City	High-Low Chamber Orchestra – Karman
Dallapiccola, Luigi	Sei cori di Michelangelo Buonarroti il giovane	1938-04-26	Prague	[unknown ensemble] – Kabelác
Enescu, George	Piano Sonata No. 3	1938-12-06	Salle Gaveau, Paris	Marcel Ciampi
Ginastera, Alberto	Cantos del Tucumán	1938-07-26	Buenos Aires	Frías de López Buchardo, [unknown ensemble]
Jolivet, André	Ouverture Rondeau for four ondes Martenot, two pianos and percussion	1938-06-02	Paris	Lesur, Steytler, Berthier, Breitner, Stein, Chapiro, Carasso – Evrard
Jolivet, André	Poèmes pour le enfant	1938-05-12	Paris	Croiza / [unknown ensemble] – Désormière
Jolivet, André	Suite for String Trio	1938-11-24	Paris	Trio Pasquier
Krenek, Ernst	Piano Concerto No. 2	1938-03-17	Amsterdam	Krenek / Concertgebouw Orchestra – Walter
Piston, Walter	Symphony No. 1	1938-04-08	Boston	Boston Symphony – Piston
Revultas, Silvestre	Sensemayá	1938-12-15	Mexico City	[unknown orchestra] – Revueltas
Rubbra, Edmund	Symphony No. 2	1938-12-16	London	BBC Symphony – Rubbra
Schoenberg, Arnold	Orchestration of Johannes Brahms' Piano Quartet	1938-05-07	Los Angeles	Los Angeles Philharmonic – Klemperer
Shostakovich, Dmitri	String Quartet No. 1	1938-10-10	Leningrad	Glazunov Quartet
Shostakovich, Dmitri	Suite for Jazz Orchestra No. 2	1938-11-28	Moscow	USSR State Jazz Band
Stravinsky, Igor	Dumbarton Oaks Concerto	1938-05-08	Washington DC	[unknown ensemble] – Boulanger
Tippett, Michael	Piano Sonata No. 1	1938-11-11	London	Sellick
Webern, Anton	Das Augenlicht	1938-06-17	London (ISCM 38)	BBC Symphony Orchestra and Chorus – Scherchen

=== Compositions ===
- Jean Absil – Concerto for Piano and Orchestra No. 1
- Alan Bush – Piano Concerto, Op. 18, with baritone and male choir in last movement
- Aaron Copland – Billy the Kid (ballet)
- Hanns Eisler – Roman Cantata
- George Enescu – Orchestral Suite No. 3 "Villageoise" in D major, Op. 27
- Hamilton Harty – The Children of Lir
- Roy Harris – Symphony No. 3
- Herbert Howells – Hymnus Paradisi
- Janis Ivanovs – Symphony No. 3
- Frank Martin – Sonata da chiesa
- Carl Orff – Carmina Burana
- Walter Piston – Symphony No. 1
- Silvestre Revueltas – Sensemayá (Canto para matar una culebra [Chant for the Killing of a Snake])
- Dmitri Shostakovich – String Quartet No. 1
- Ernst Toch – Cantata of Bitter Herbs
- Heitor Villa-Lobos – String Quartet No. 6 (Quarteto brasileiro no. 2)
- Leó Weiner – Divertimento for Strings No. 2

== Opera ==
- Jenő Ádám – Mária Veronika
- Paul Frederic Bowles – Denmark Vesey
- Paul Hindemith – Mathis der Maler
- Dmitri Kabalevsky – Colas Breugnon
- Jeronimas Kacinskas – Nonet
- Ernst Krenek – Karl V (composed 1931–33), Neues Deutsches Theater in Prague, 22 June 1938
- Mark Lothar – Tailor Wibbel
- Douglas Stuart Moore – The Devil and Daniel Webster

== Film ==
- George Gershwin – The Goldwyn Follies
- Erich Korngold – The Adventures of Robin Hood
- Sergei Prokofiev – Alexander Nevsky (film)

== Musical theatre ==
- The Boys from Syracuse (Richard Rodgers and Lorenz Hart) – Broadway production opened at the Alvin Theatre on November 23 and ran for 235 performances
- Great Lady Broadway production opened at the Majestic Theatre on December 1 and ran for only 20 performances
- Maritza aka Countess Maritza, London production opened at the Palace Theatre on July 6
- The Fleet's Lit Up, London opened at the London Hippodrome and ran for 191 performances
- Hellzapoppin', Broadway revue opened at the 46th Street Theatre on September 22 and ran for 1404 performances
- I Married an Angel, Broadway production opened at the Sam S. Shubert Theatre on May 11 and ran for 338 performances
- Knickerbocker Holiday, Broadway production opened at the Ethel Barrymore Theatre on October 19 and ran for 168 performances
- Leave It to Me!, Broadway production opened at the Imperial Theatre on November 9 and ran for 291 performances
- Nine Sharp, London production opened at The Little Theatre on January 26 and ran for 405 performances
- Operette, London production opened at His Majesty's Theatre on March 16
- Right This Way, Broadway production opened at the 46th Street Theatre on January 5 and ran for 14 performances
- Sing Out The News, Broadway revue opened at the Music Box Theatre on September 24 and ran for 105 performances
- These Foolish Things London revue opened at the Palladium on September 29
- You Never Know, Broadway production opened at the Winter Garden Theatre on September 21 and ran for 78 performances

== Musical films ==
- The Big Broadcast of 1938, starring W. C. Fields, Bob Hope, Dorothy Lamour and Martha Raye
- Carefree, starring Fred Astaire and Ginger Rogers
- Champagnegaloppen, starring Svend Methling and Valdemar Møller.
- Cocoanut Grove, starring Fred MacMurray, Harriet Hilliard, Ben Blue and Eve Arden.
- Cowboy from Brooklyn, starring Dick Powell and Priscilla Lane
- Doctor Rhythm, starring Bing Crosby, Mary Carlisle and Beatrice Lillie.
- Dos amigos y un amor, directed by Lucas Demare
- Es leuchten die Sterne, starring Ernst Fritz Fürbringer and Fridtjof Mjøen
- Freshman Year, starring Constance Moore, William Lundigan and Dixie Dunbar. Directed by Frank McDonald.
- The Girl Of The Golden West, starring Jeanette MacDonald and Nelson Eddy
- Going Places, starring Dick Powell, Anita Louise, Allen Jenkins and Ronald Reagan and featuring Louis Armstrong and Maxine Sullivan
- Gold Diggers in Paris, starring Rudy Vallée, Rosemary Lane, Hugh Herbert and Allen Jenkins. Directed by Ray Enright.
- The Great Waltz, released November 4 starring Luise Rainer and Miliza Korjus. Oscar Hammerstein II contributed new English lyrics to the music of Johann Strauss II
- Happy Landing, starring Sonja Henie, Don Ameche and Ethel Merman and featuring the Raymond Scott Quintet
- Hold That Co-ed, starring John Barrymore, George Murphy and Joan Davis
- Honeysuckle, starring Hugo del Carril and Libertad Lamarque
- It's in the Air, starring George Formby, Polly Ward and Jack Hobbs. Directed by Anthony Kimmins.
- Jettatore, starring Tito Lusiardo, directed by Luis Bayon Herrera
- Joy of Living, starring Irene Dunne and Douglas Fairbanks Jr.
- Kicking the Moon Around, starring Bert Ambrose, Evelyn Dall, Harry Richman and Florence Desmond.
- Kilómetro 111, starring Delia Garcés and Pepe Arias, directed by Mario Soffici
- La Route Enchantée, starring Charles Trenet, directed by Pierre Caron
- La Valentina starring Jorge Negrete and Esperanza Baur
- Love Finds Andy Hardy starring Mickey Rooney and Judy Garland
- Mad About Music, starring Deanna Durbin. Directed by Norman Taurog.
- My Irish Molly, directed by Alex Bryce, starring Binkie Stuart, Tom Burke and Maureen O'Hara
- My Lucky Star, starring Sonja Henie, Richard Greene, Joan Davis and Art Jarrett
- Napoli d'altri tempi, starring Vittorio De Sica, Emma Gramatica and Elisa Cegani.
- Outside of Paradise, starring Phil Regan and Penny Singleton
- Radio City Revels, released February 11, starring Bob Burns, Jack Oakie and Kenny Baker and featuring Jane Froman performing with Hal Kemp's orchestra.
- Romance in the Dark, starring Gladys Swarthout, John Boles, John Barrymore and Claire Dodd. Directed by H. C. Potter.
- Sally, Irene and Mary, starring Alice Faye, Tony Martin, Fred Allen, Jimmy Durante, Joan Davis and Marjorie Weaver
- Sing You Sinners, starring Bing Crosby, Fred MacMurray and Donald O'Connor.
- The Singing Cop, starring Keith Falkner, Marta Labarr, Ivy St Helier and Bobbie Comber
- Start Cheering, released March 3, starring Jimmy Durante, Gertrude Niesen and the Three Stooges.
- Sweethearts, starring Jeanette MacDonald and Nelson Eddy
- That Certain Age, released October 7, starring Deanna Durbin. Songs by (lyrics) Harold Adamson and (music) Jimmy McHugh
- Tropic Holiday, released July 1, starring Bob Burns, Dorothy Lamour, Ray Milland and Martha Raye
- Volga-Volga, starring Lyubov Orlova, directed by Grigori Aleksandrov
- We're Going to Be Rich starring Gracie Fields, Victor McLaglen and Brian Donlevy

== Births ==
- January 6 – Adriano Celentano, singer-songwriter
- January 8 – Yevgeny Nesterenko, opera singer and educator (died 2021)
- January 11 – Narvel Felts, country singer
- January 13
  - Daevid Allen, Australian musician (died 2015)
  - Paavo Heininen, Finnish composer
  - Shivkumar Sharma, santoor player
- January 14
  - Jack Jones, singer
  - Allen Toussaint, songwriter and record producer (died 2015)
- January 18 – Hargus "Pig" Robbins, session piano player
- January 21 – Wolfman Jack, DJ (died 1995)
- January 25
  - Etta James, blues singer (died 2012)
  - Vladimir Vysotsky, singer, songwriter, poet and actor (died 1980)
- February 11
  - Edith Mathis, Swiss operatic soprano (died 2025)
  - Bobby "Boris" Pickett, singer ("Monster Mash") (died 2007)
- February 16 – John Corigliano, composer
- February 22 – Bobby Hendricks, R&B singer (The Drifters) (died 2022)
- February 27
  - Margaret Curphey, British soprano (died 2024)
  - Mobarak Hossain Khan, surbahar player and musicologist (died 2019)
  - Jake Thackray, singer-songwriter (died 2002)
- March 2
  - Simon Estes, operatic bass
  - Lawrence Payton, Motown tenor (The Four Tops) (died 1997)
- March 3 – Douglas Leedy, composer (died 2015)
- March 9 – Lill-Babs, pop singer (died 2018)
- March 12 – Dimitri Terzakis, composer
- March 13
  - Hans-Joachim Hespos, composer (died 2022)
  - Jean-Claude Risset, composer (died 2016)
- March 18 – Charley Pride, country singer (died 2020)
- March 25 – Hoyt Axton, country singer-songwriter and actor (died 1999)
- April 2 – Booker Little, jazz trumpeter and composer (died 1961)
- April 3 – Jeff Barry, songwriter
- April 4 – Declan Mulligan, rock guitarist (The Beau Brummels) (died 2021)
- April 7
  - Spencer Dryden, rock drummer (Jefferson Airplane, The Dinosaurs) (died 2005)
  - Freddie Hubbard, jazz trumpeter (died 2008)
- April 13 – Frederic Rzewski, composer (died 2021)
- April 19 – Jonathan Tunick, composer
- April 26
  - Duane Eddy, rock guitarist (died 2024)
  - Maurice Williams, doo-wop vocalist (Maurice Williams and the Zodiacs)
- April 29 – Klaus Voormann, rock guitarist, producer and sleeve designer (Manfred Mann)
- May 4 – Tyrone Davis, singer (died 2005)
- May 10
  - Henry Fambrough, R&B vocalist (The Spinners)
  - Maxim Shostakovich, orchestral conductor
- May 11 – Bruce Langhorne, folk guitarist (died 2017)
- May 13 – Lucille Starr, French-Canadian singer (died 2020)
- May 15 – Lenny Welch, pop singer
- May 19 – Herbie Flowers, bass player (died 2024)
- May 26 – Teresa Stratas, operatic soprano
- May 27 – Elizabeth Harwood, operatic soprano (died 1990)
- May 28 – Prince Buster, ska musician (died 2016)
- June 9 – Charles Wuorinen, composer (died 2020)
- June 13 – Gwynne Howell, opera singer
- June 14 – Julie Felix, folk singer (died 2020)
- June 15 – Jean-Claude Éloy, composer (died 2025)
- June 20 – Mickie Most, record producer (died 2003)
- June 23 – Alan Vega, American rock singer, musician (Suicide (band)) (died 2016)
- June 24 – Edoardo Vianello, Italian singer and composer
- June 26 – Billy Davis Jr., pop singer (The 5th Dimension)
- July 1 – Pandit Hariprasad Chaurasia, bansuri player
- July 4 – Bill Withers, singer-songwriter (died 2020)
- July 5 – Ronnie Self, American singer-songwriter (died 1981)
- July 9 – Paul Chihara, American composer
- July 14 – Tommy Vig, Hungarian composer, arranger and vibraphonist
- July 27 – Isabelle Aubret, singer
- July 28 – George Cummings, rock guitarist and songwriter (Dr. Hook & The Medicine Show)
- July 31 – Bonnie Brown, country singer (The Browns) (died 2016)
- August 8 – Jacques Hétu, composer (died 2010)
- August 13 – Dave "Baby" Cortez, pop keyboard player
- August 21 – Kenny Rogers, country singer (died 2020)
- August 23 – Roger Greenaway, singer-songwriter (David & Jonathan)
- August 24
  - David Freiberg, rock musician (Quicksilver Messenger Service)
  - Mason Williams, guitarist and composer
- August 26 – Jet Black, punk rock/new wave drummer (The Stranglers) (died 2022)
- September 3 – Larry Grossman, composer of Broadway musicals
- September 6 – Joan Tower, composer and singer
- September 19 – Zygmunt Krauze, pianist and composer
- September 21
  - Atli Heimir Sveinsson, composer (died 2019)
  - Yuji Takahashi, composer
- September 28 – Ben E. King, singer (died 2015)
- October 3 – Eddie Cochran, singer (died 1960)
- October 15
  - Marv Johnson, singer (died 1993)
  - Fela Kuti, Afrobeat multi-instrumentalist (died 1997)
- October 16 – Nico, singer-songwriter, actress and model (died 1988)
- October 18 – Ronnie Bright, The Coasters (died 2015)
- November 2 – Jay Black (Jay and the Americans) (died 2021)
- November 4 – Harry Elston (Friends Of Distinction)
- November 6
  - Jim Pike (The Lettermen) (died 2019)
  - P. J. Proby, singer
- November 7 – Dee Clark, soul singer (died 1990)
- November 16 – Troy Seals, singer, songwriter
- November 17 – Gordon Lightfoot, singer-songwriter (died 2023)
- November 19 – Hank Medress, doo-wop vocalist and producer (The Tokens) (died 2007)
- December 1 – Sandy Nelson, drummer (died 2022)
- December 5 – J. J. Cale, singer-songwriter (died 2013)
- December 8 – Bernie Krause, bioacoustician
- December 10 – Yuri Temirkanov, conductor (died 2023)
- December 11 – McCoy Tyner, jazz pianist (died 2020)
- December 12 – Connie Francis, singer
- December 15 – Fela Kuti, Afrobeat pioneer (died 1997)
- December 18 – Chas Chandler, musician, record producer and manager (died 1996)
- December 20 – John Harris Harbison, composer
- December 24 – Mesías Maiguashca, composer
- December 28 – Charles Neville (The Neville Brothers) (died 2018)
- date unknown
  - Fanta Damba, jalimosolu singer
  - Abdul Jabbar, singer (died 2017)
  - Atli Heimir Sveinsson, composer (died 2019)

== Deaths ==
- January 19 – Rosa Mayreder, feminist writer, artist and musician, 79
- January 20 – Nikolai Zhilyayev, musicologist, 56
- January 29 – Carl Venth, violinist and composer, 77
- February 4 – Dominique Heckmes, composer and music critic, 59
- February 25 – Růžena Maturová, operatic contralto, 68
- February 27 – Gianni Bettini, phonograph maker (born 1860)
- March 2 – Ben Harney, ragtime composer & entertainer, 65
- March 12 – Lyda Roberti, actress and singer, 31 (heart attack)
- March 18 – Cyril Rootham, composer, 62
- April 5 – Reine Davies, actress and singer, 51 (heart attack)
- April 8 – Joe "King" Oliver, jazz trumpeter & band leader, 52
- April 12 – Feodor Chaliapin, operatic bass, 65
- April 18 – Richard Runciman Terry, musicologist, 72
- May 7 – Papa Charlie Jackson, American blues musician, 50
- June 26 – James Weldon Johnson, US songwriter, author, diplomat and educationalist, 67
- July 9 – H. Benne Henton, American ragtime and early jazz saxophonist songwriter, 60
- July 24 – Anatole Friedland, American composer and songwriter, 57
- July 27 – James Thornton, English-born US songwriter and vaudeville comedian, 76
- August 14 – Landon Ronald, pianist and composer, 65
- August 16 – Robert Johnson, blues musician, 27 (suspected strychnine poisoning)
- August 30 – James Scott, ragtime composer, 53
- September 2 – Fleta Jan Brown Spencer, songwriter, composer, pianist, and singer, 56
- September 4 – Oreste Candi, violin-maker, 72
- September 8 – Agustín Magaldi, tango singer, 39
- September 12 – Mary Elizabeth Turner Salter, American soprano singer and composer, 82
- September 28 – Con Conrad, songwriter, 47
- October 22 – May Irwin, vaudeville star, 76
- October 23 – Fred Barnes, music hall entertainer, 53 (Tuberculosis)
- October 27
  - Alma Gluck, soprano, 54 (liver failure)
  - Khadija Gayibova, Azerbaijani pianist, 45 (executed)
- November 21 – Leopold Godowsky, pianist and composer, 68
- December 10 – Mario Pilati, composer, 35
- December 21 – James Milton Black, hymn-writer and choir-master, 82
- date unknown
  - Minnie Egener, operatic mezzo-soprano (born 1881)
  - Attilio Salvaneschi, operatic tenor (born 1873)
- probable – Oskar Böhme, trumpeter and composer (born 1870)
