= You're as Pretty as a Picture =

Song by Deanna Durbin
- Released: 1973
- Composer(s): Jimmy McHugh
- Lyricist(s): Harold Adamson

"You're as Pretty as a Picture" is a popular song composed by Jimmy McHugh and written by Harold Adamson. It was first performed by Deanna Durbin in the 1938 musical film That Certain Age.

The song was also recorded by Gene Krupa and His Orchestra with Irene Daye on the vocals, and Geraldo and His Orchestra with vocalist Al Bowlly (1938).

== See also ==
- 1938 in music
