= Love Walked In =

1930 jazz song

"Love Walked In" is a song composed by George Gershwin, with lyrics by Ira Gershwin. The tune was composed in 1930, but the lyric was not written until 1937, for the movie musical The Goldwyn Follies (1938), where it was sung by Danny Beecher (Kenny Baker). Hit versions include Sammy Kaye (1938), The Hilltoppers (1953), Ella Fitzgerald (1959), The Flamingos (1959), and Dinah Washington (1960). Artie Shaw recorded the song in the early 1940s.

== Recorded versions ==
- Louis Armstrong and his orchestra (recorded May 18, 1938, released by Decca Records as catalog number 1842A, with the flip side "Something Tells Me")
- Kenny Baker and Harry Sosnik's orchestra (recorded April 22, 1938, released by Decca Records as catalog number 1795A, with the flip side "Lost and Found")
- George Benson, along with George Duvivier, Al Harewood, and Mickey Tucker – Jazz On A Sunday Afternoon Vol. III (1982)
- Bing Crosby – was recorded November 12, 1947, and released by Decca Records as catalog number 24542, with the flip side "Summertime". The recording was included in the album Bing Crosby Sings Songs by George Gershwin.
- Jimmy Dorsey and his orchestra (recorded March 16, 1938, released by Decca Records as catalog number 1724B, with the flip side "At a Perfume Counter")
- Ferrante & Teicher recorded this on the album The Keys To Her Apartment (2011)
- Ella Fitzgerald – Ella Fitzgerald Sings the George and Ira Gershwin Songbook (1959)
- The Hilltoppers (released by Dot Records as catalog number 15105, with the flip side "To Be Alone")
- Gene Kardos and his Orchestra (vocal by Pat Henry), recorded January 13, 1938, released by Melotone Records as catalog number 8-03-05, with the flip side "Love Is Here to Stay")
- Sammy Kaye and his Orchestra (recorded March 20, 1938, released by Vocalion Records as catalog number 4017, with the flip side "Moments Like This")
- Teddi King – Bidin' My Time (1956)
- Felix Knight – recorded February 11, 1938, by Leo Reisman, released on Victor 27626 and included in the 78rpm album "Leo Reisman Rhythms"
- Joe Loss and his orchestra (recorded November 1, 1954, in London, released by EMI on the His Master's Voice label as catalog number BD 6184)
- Allen Roth Orchestra (vocal by Lawrence Brooks, released by Silvertone Records as catalog number 18A, with the flip side "Make Believe")
- Artie Shaw and his orchestra (recorded June 6, 1945, released by RCA Victor Records as catalog number 20-1745, with the flip side "Dancing on the Ceiling"; later recorded January 6, 1950, released by Decca Records as catalog number 24869, with the flip side "I Get a Kick out of You" and as catalog number 27213, with the flip side "Don't Worry 'Bout Me")
- Dinah Shore (released by RCA Victor Records as catalog number 20-1651, with the flip side "Someone to Watch Over Me")
