= Jane Hamilton (actress) =

American actress (1915–2004)

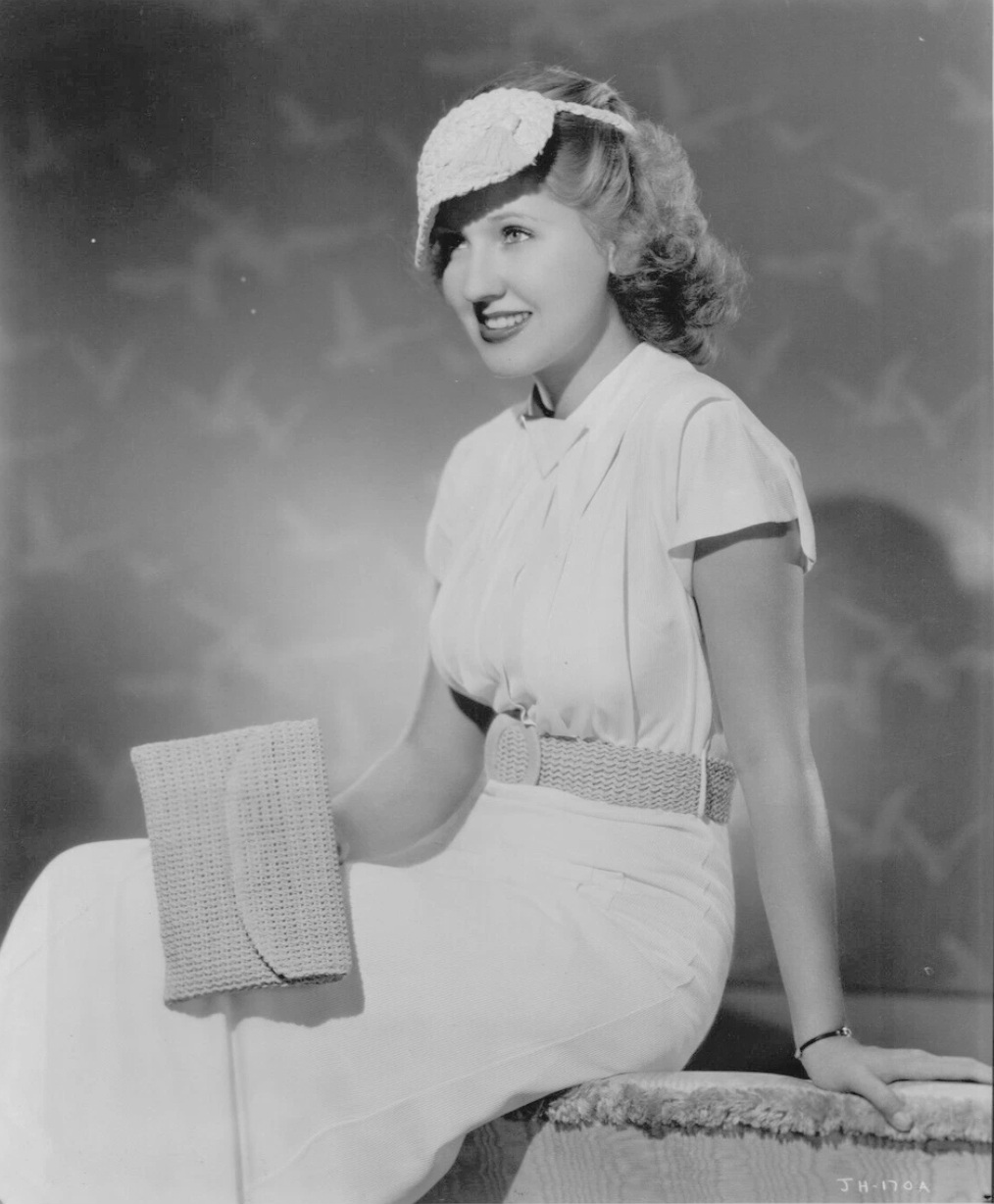
- Hamilton in 1936
- Born: November 7, 1915; Baltimore, Maryland, U.S.
- Died: February 9, 2004 (aged 88); Malibu, California, U.S.
- Occupation: Actress
- Years active: 1933–1949
- Spouse(s): William Hollingsworth; Edward G. Wormhoudt
- Children: 2

Jane Hamilton (November 7, 1915 – February 9, 2004) was an American film actress. She appeared in over 20 films between 1933 and 1949.

== Biography ==
Jane Hamilton was born on November 7, 1915, in Baltimore, Maryland. She began her film career in the early 1930s, initially appearing as a dancer in musical productions. One of her earliest screen roles was as part of the chorus in Roman Scandals (1933), followed by an appearance as a mannequin in Roberta (1935), which led to her being placed under contract with RKO-Radio Pictures.

By her early twenties, Hamilton had gained attention for her striking appearance and poise. She was frequently cast in elaborate dance sequences and musical numbers, experiences that reportedly taught her valuable camera technique. Her classical blonde looks, described at the time as "almost perfect," contributed to her reputation as one of Hollywood's most beautiful young actresses.

Hamilton received formal screen training through a Hollywood studio acting program for young talent, where she was coached in performance technique and on-camera presence. She continued to receive studio backing and by 1936 had her contract with RKO renewed, with plans announced for her to appear opposite William Powell in a film tentatively titled One to Two.

That same year, she was named by painter and illustrator Duncan Gleason as one of five actresses in Hollywood with the most beautiful legs, alongside Marlene Dietrich, Ginger Rogers, and Ruby Keeler. Gleason reportedly reviewed over a thousand studio photographs and observed numerous productions before selecting Hamilton as part of this elite group, praising her physical elegance and modeling experience.

Although Hamilton never became a major star, she amassed a number of film credits throughout the 1930s and 1940s, often appearing in comedies and musical features. She is perhaps best known today for her appearances in the early Three Stooges short Three Missing Links, and with Jimmy Durante in Start Cheering.

Hamilton died in Malibu, California in 2004.

== Filmography ==
Year	Title	Role	Notes
1933	Roman Scandals	Chorus Dancer	Uncredited
1934	Bottoms Up	Goldwyn Girl	Uncredited
1934	Kid Millions	Chorus Member	Uncredited
1934	The Mighty Barnum	Chorus Girl	Uncredited
1935	Roberta	Mannequin	Uncredited
1935	A Night at the Biltmore Bowl	Dancer	Uncredited
1935	Old Man Rhythm	College Girl	Uncredited
1936	Follow the Fleet	Chorine	Uncredited
1936	The Farmer in the Dell	Unknown	
1936	Wanted: Jane Turner	Secretary	Uncredited
1937	Shall We Dance	Woman on Ship	Uncredited
1937	Paid to Dance	Unknown	
1938	The Goldwyn Follies	Unknown	
1938	Who Killed Gail Preston?	Unknown	
1938	Women in Prison	Unknown	
1938	Start Cheering	College Student	
1938	When G-Men Step In	Unknown	
1938	Extortion	Unknown	
1938	The Main Event	Unknown	
1938	Three Missing Links	Mirabel Mirabel	Three Stooges short
1947	That Hagen Girl	Unknown	
1949	Everybody Does It	Unknown	Final film appearance
