= Chaz Chase =

Russian-born American vaudeville entertainer

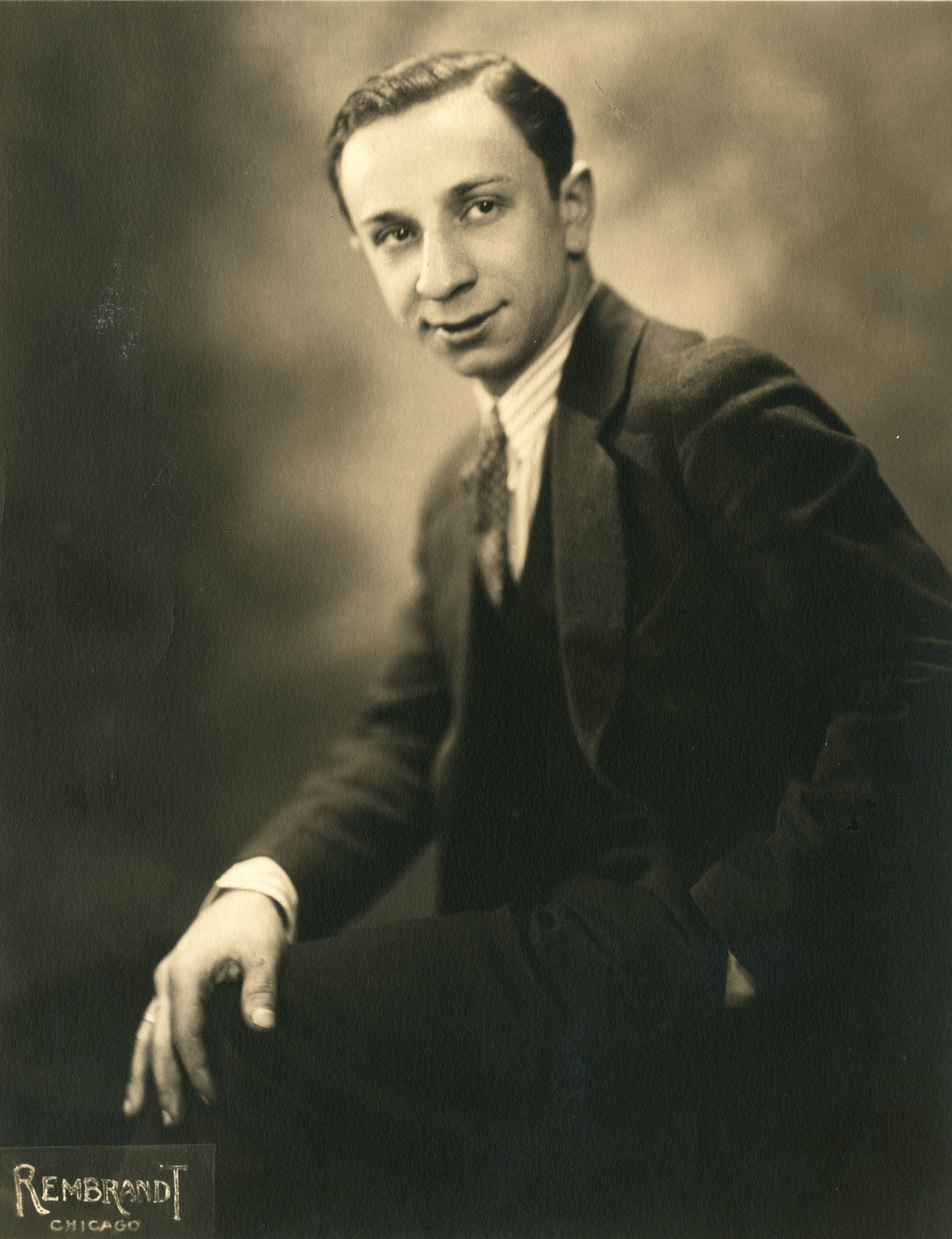
- 1925 publicity photo
- Born: Max Oskye; March 6, 1901; Kiev, Russian Empire
- Died: August 4, 1983 (aged 82); Los Angeles, California, U.S.
- Other names: Charles Chase
- Occupation: Vaudeville entertainer
- Years active: c. 1920–1982

Charles "Chaz" Chase (March 6, 1901 – August 4, 1983) was a Russian-born American vaudeville entertainer.

== Life and career ==
He was born in Kiev, then part of the Russian Empire; the 1910 US census indicates that his birth name was Max Oskye. As a child he moved to the United States with his mother and sisters. He grew up in Chicago, and initially trained as a ballet dancer before turning to vaudeville as an "eccentric comedian", inspired by the entertainer Joe Frisco. His speciality was to eat (or, according to some sources, appear to eat) a wide variety of non-edible objects such as cardboard, paper flowers, and lit matches, cigars and cigarettes. On stage he would wear baggy clothes, sometimes walk in a circle, crouching ever closer to the ground, and on occasions would end his act with a comic striptease.

He was popular in vaudeville shows in the 1920s and 1930s. In 1928 he featured in his own short film, Chaz Chase, the Unique Comedian. He appeared on Broadway in several shows including Ballyhoo of 1930 (1930), Saluta (1934), and High Kickers (1941). He also featured in cameo roles in several movies, including West of Zanzibar, which starred Lon Chaney (1928): Aventure à Paris (1936); Start Cheering (1938); and The Man on the Eiffel Tower (1948). He had longstanding engagements in cabaret shows in Paris, at clubs including Le Crazy Horse, and also undertook global tours with Bob Hope and others as part of the USO.

After a period of relative obscurity he re-emerged in the 1950s. He made occasional appearances on television variety shows until shortly before his death, including programs hosted by Ed Sullivan, Johnny Carson and David Letterman in the United States, Rudi Carrell in Germany, and Tommy Cooper in Britain, where he also appeared on The Good Old Days in 1979. His last stage appearances in 1982 were in the show Sugar Babies.

He died in Los Angeles in 1983, at the age of 82.
