= Harold Adamson =

American lyricist (1906–1980)

Background information
- Born: Harold Campbell Adamson; December 10, 1906; Greenville, New Jersey, U.S.
- Died: August 17, 1980 (aged 73) Beverly Hills, California, U.S.
- Occupation: Lyricist
- Years active: 1930s–1960s

Harold Campbell Adamson (December 10, 1906 – August 17, 1980) was an American lyricist from the 1930s through the 1960s.

== Biography ==
=== Early life ===
Adamson, the son of building contractor Harold Adamson and Marion "Minnie" Campbell Adamson, was born in Greenville, New Jersey, United States. He was raised in Brooklyn, New York, where he went to public schools. He later attended the Hackley prep school in Tarrytown, New York.

Adamson suffered from polio as a child which limited the use of his right hand. Initially, Adamson was interested in acting, but he began writing songs and poetry as a teenager.

He went on to study acting at the University of Kansas and Harvard, where he wrote the book and lyrics for Close-Up, the first musical produced by the Harvard Dramatic Club.

=== Career ===
Vincent Youmans had noticed Adamson's work at Harvard and, after Adamson graduated, recruited him to write lyrics for his 1930 Broadway musical Smiles. Adamson then began working with composer Burton Lane, contributing the song "Say the Word" to The Third Little Show and "Crazy Street" to Singin' the Blues, and writing the songs for Earl Carroll's Vanities, all in 1931. In the same year, Adamson, with lyricist Mack Gordon and composer Harry Revel, also placed "(I'm) All Wrapped Up in You" in the revue Everybody's Welcome and "Where's My Happy Ending?" in Revel and Gordon's musical Fast and Furious. In 1932 Adamson collaborated with Revel and Gordon on "Do Say You Do" for their musical Smiling Faces.

Adamson and Lane both entered into songwriting contracts with MGM in 1933. Their first film was Dancing Lady, for which they wrote the hit song "Everything I Have Is Yours". Adamson went on to write lyrics for original songs for more than 60 films. After Lane he worked with Walter Donaldson, then, on many films, with Jimmy McHugh, and later with Jule Styne, Hoagy Carmichael, Harry Warren, Sammy Fain and others.

Later in his career, Adamson periodically returned to Broadway, writing lyrics for Banjo Eyes (1941) and As the Girls Go (1948). In 1963 he added words to Victor Young's music for the 1956 film Around the World in 80 Days (he had written lyrics for the film's theme, "Around the World", though they were not used in the film), and also wrote new songs with Sammy Fain, for a stage adaptation presented at the Jones Beach Theater in Wantagh, New York. His shows Hi Ya, Gentlemen, with Johnny Green (1940), and Strip for Action, with Jimmy McHugh (1956), closed out of town.

In 1941 Adamson collaborated with Pierce Norman and baseball's Joe DiMaggio to write "In the Beauty of Tahoe", published by Larry Spier, Inc.

Adamson also occasionally worked in television. In 1953 he added lyrics to Eliot Daniel's theme for the sitcom I Love Lucy. He and Harry Warren wrote the themes for two Western series: The Life and Legend of Wyatt Earp, which aired from 1955 to 1961, and The Californians, which aired from 1957 to 1959.

Adamson was adept at adding lyrics to previously written melodies. In addition to "Around the World" and the I Love Lucy theme, in 1942 he added lyrics to Louis Alter's "Manhattan Serenade" and to "Mardi Gras" from Ferde Grofé's 1926 Mississippi Suite, which became "Daybreak". Both adaptations were commercial successes. He also wrote "The Woodpecker Song" to Eldo Di Lazzaro's music for "Reginella campagnola" and "Ferry-Boat Serenade" to Di Lazzaro's "La piccinina", both hits in 1940.

His last projects, along with Around the World in 80 Days, were the films A Ticklish Affair and Island of Love in 1963 and The Incredible Mr. Limpet in 1964.

=== Personal life ===
Adamson married Judy Crisfeld in 1935. They had a daughter, Eve, who later founded the Jean Cocteau Repertory in New York City. Harold and Judy divorced in 1941. In 1947 he married Gretchen Davidson, a Broadway actress.

== Awards and nominations ==
Five of Adamson's songs written for films were nominated for Academy Award for Best Song (see Notable songs).

He was inducted into the Songwriters Hall of Fame in 1972.

In 2007, ASCAP and Adamson's heirs established the annual Harold Adamson Lyric Award, given to aspiring lyricists who "demonstrate talent and an intelligent and sensitive use of language". In 2024, ASCAP awarded the first Harold Adamson Prize for Mid-Career Concert Music Composers and Performers.

== Films ==
Harold Adamson wrote several original songs for each of these films:

- Dancing Lady (1933, music by Burton Lane)
- Bottoms Up (1934, music by Burton Lane)
- Reckless (1935, with Edwin Knopf, music by Burton Lane and Jack King)
- Here Comes the Band (1935, music by Burton Lane and Walter Donaldson)
- The Great Ziegfeld (1936, music by Walter Donaldson)
- Banjo on My Knee (1936, music by Jimmy McHugh)
- Hitting a New High (1937, music by Jimmy McHugh)
- You're a Sweetheart (1937, music by Jimmy McHugh)
- Top of the Town (1937, music by Jimmy McHugh)
- Merry-Go-Round of 1938 (1937, music by Jimmy McHugh)
- Mad About Music (1938, music by Jimmy McHugh)
- The Road to Reno (1938, music by Jimmy McHugh)
- That Certain Age (1938, music by Jimmy McHugh)
- Around the World (1943, music by Jimmy McHugh)
- Higher and Higher (1943, music by Jimmy McHugh)
- Hit Parade of 1943 (1943, music by Jule Styne)
- Four Jills in a Jeep (1944, music by Jimmy McHugh)
- Something for the Boys (1944, music by Jimmy McHugh)
- Bring On the Girls (film) (1945, music by Jimmy McHugh)
- Doll Face (1945, music by Jimmy McHugh)
- Nob Hill (1945, music by Jimmy McHugh)
- Calendar Girl (1947, music by Jimmy McHugh)
- Hit Parade of 1947 (1947, music by Jimmy McHugh)
- Smash-Up, the Story of a Woman (1947, music by Jimmy McHugh)
- If You Knew Susie (1948, music by Jimmy McHugh)
- Jupiter's Darling (1955, music by Burton Lane)
- An Affair to Remember (1957, music by Harry Warren)
- The Incredible Mr. Limpet (1964, music by Sammy Fain)

He contributed original songs to many other films.

== Notable songs ==
- "Time on My Hands". With Mack Gordon. Music by Vincent Youmans. From the 1930 musical Smiles.
- "Everything I Have Is Yours". Music by Burton Lane. From the 1933 film Dancing Lady.
- "Your Head on My Shoulder". Music by Burton Lane. From the 1934 film Kid Millions.
- "Did I Remember". Music by Walter Donaldson. From the 1936 film Suzy. Nominated for an Academy Award for Best Song.
- "There's Something in the Air". Music by Jimmy McHugh. From the 1936 film Banjo on My Knee.
- "Where the Lazy River Goes By". Music by Jimmy McHugh. From the 1936 film Banjo on My Knee.
- "Where Are You?". Music by Jimmy McHugh. From the 1937 film Top of the Town.
- "You're a Sweetheart". Music by Jimmy McHugh. From the 1937 film of the same name.
- "My Own". Music by Jimmy McHugh. From the 1938 film That Certain Age. Nominated for an Academy Award for Best Song.
- "You're as Pretty as a Picture". Music by Jimmy McHugh. From the 1938 film That Certain Age.
- "It's a Wonderful World". Music by Jan Savitt and John K. Watson. 1939.
- "Ferry-Boat Serenade". Music by Eldo Di Lazzaro. 1940.
- "The Woodpecker Song". Music by Eldo Di Lazzaro. 1940.
- "Manhattan Serenade". Music by Louis Alter. 1942.
- "Daybreak". Music by Ferde Grofé. 1942.
- "Comin' in on a Wing and a Prayer". Music by Jimmy McHugh. 1943.
- "Change of Heart". Music by Jule Styne. From the 1943 film Hit Parade of 1943. Nominated for an Academy Award for Best Song.
- "A Lovely Way to Spend an Evening". Music by Jimmy McHugh. 1943.
- "I Couldn't Sleep a Wink Last Night". Music by Jimmy McHugh. From the 1944 film Higher and Higher. Nominated for an Academy Award for Best Song.
- "Dig You Later (A Hubba-Hubba-Hubba)". Music by Jimmy McHugh. From the 1945 film Doll Face.
- "It's a Most Unusual Day". Music by Jimmy McHugh. From the 1948 film A Date with Judy.
- "You Say the Nicest Things, Baby". Music by Jimmy McHugh. From the 1948 musical As the Girls Go.
- "My Resistance Is Low". Music by Hoagy Carmichael. From the 1952 film The Las Vegas Story (film).
- "Around the World". Music by Victor Young. 1956.
- "I Just Found Out About Love". Music by Jimmy McHugh. From the 1956 musical Strip for Action.
- "An Affair to Remember (Our Love Affair)". With Leo McCarey. Music by Harry Warren. From the 1957 film An Affair to Remember. Nominated for an Academy Award for Best Song.

See also Songs with lyrics by Harold Adamson and Films with songs by Harold Adamson.
