= Three Missing Links =

1938 American short film by Jules White

- Directed by: Jules White
- Written by: Searle Kramer
- Produced by: Jules White
- Starring: Moe Howard; Larry Fine; Curly Howard; James C. Morton; Monte Collins; Jane Hamilton; John Lester Johnson; Ray "Crash" Corrigan; Tanner the Lion
- Cinematography: Henry Freulich
- Edited by: Charles Nelson
- Distributed by: Columbia Pictures
- Release date: July 29, 1938 (U.S.)
- Running time: 18:04
- Country: United States
- Language: English

Three Missing Links is a 1938 short subject directed by Jules White starring American slapstick comedy team The Three Stooges (Moe Howard, Larry Fine and Curly Howard). It is the 33rd entry in the series released by Columbia Pictures starring the comedians, who appearing in 190 shorts for the studio between 1934 and 1959.

== Plot ==
The Stooges are employed as janitors at Super Terrific Productions, a Hollywood movie studio. Their mundane responsibilities take an unexpected turn when their penchant for violent and uncouth behavior catches the attention of studio president B. O. Botswaddle, the studio president, who is reviewing the script for the forthcoming film Jilted in the Jungle. Before production can begin, Botswaddle must find an actor who is sufficiently ape-like to play the part of a gorilla, and he realizes that Curly is perfect for the part – the embodiment of a primeval archetype, colloquially known as the "missing link". He also judges Moe and Larry to be ideal for the roles of prehistoric Neanderthals.

The trio journeys to Africa, where the filming is to take place. Amidst the intricacies of setting up camp, Curly meets a purveyor of unconventional remedies, and purchases "love candy" in a bid to win the affections of the leading lady, Mirabel Mirabel. The Stooges' day is spent in inept efforts to pitch a tent, and the tranquility of their night is punctuated by a curious lion's foray into their encampment, which prompts a hasty retreat by the Stooges.

The following day descends into chaos as a genuine gorilla native to the jungle wanders onto the film set and is initially mistaken for Curly in simian costume. Curlly belatedly arrives on the set and becomes embroiled in a confrontation with the gorilla. In an attempt to soothe the agitated creature, Curly offers it the "love candy", and ingests some himself to encourage the gorilla. As a result, Curly becomes enamored with the creature, which flees in terror from Curly's advances.

== Cast ==
=== Credited ===
- Moe Howard as Moe
- Larry Fine as Larry
- Curly Howard as Curly
- Monte Collins as Herbert Herringbone
- Jane Hamilton as Mirabel Mirabel
- Ray "Crash" Corrigan as Naba the gorilla

=== Uncredited ===
- James C. Morton as B. O. Botswaddle
- John Lester Johnson as Dr. Ba Loni Sulami
- Tanner the Lion as Lion

== Production notes ==
Three Missing Links was filmed from April 7 to April 12, 1938. It is the fourth of sixteen Stooge shorts to use the word "three" in the title and the first entry directed by Columbia Pictures Short Subject head Jules White.

The clip of the Stooges arguing in B. O. Botswaddle's office was featured prominently in the 1989 film Lethal Weapon 2.

Tanner the Lion appears before the final act of the film, having previously appeared in Wee Wee Monsieur from the same year, and Movie Maniacs from 2 years prior.

== Quotes ==
- Moe: "We're terrific!"
- Larry: "We're colossal!"
- Curly: "We're even mediocre!"
