= 1938 in country music =

This is a list of notable events in country music that took place in the year 1938.

== Top Hillbilly-Folk (Country) Recordings 1938 ==
The following songs were extracted from records included in Joel Whitburn's Pop Memories 1890-1954, record sales reported on the "Discography of American Historical Recordings" website, and other sources as specified. Numerical rankings are approximate, they are only used as a frame of reference.

Rank	Artist	Title	Label	Recorded	Released	Chart Positions
1	Roy Acuff and the Crazy Tennesseans	"Wabash Cannon Ball"	Vocalion 4466	October 21, 1936	November 1938	US BB 1938 #223, US #12 for 1 week, 2 total weeks, US Hillbilly 1938 #1, 1,000,000 sales, National Recording Registry 2005
2	Cliff Bruner's Texas Wanderers	"It Makes No Difference Now"	Decca 5604	September 13, 1938	September 30, 1938	US Hillbilly 1938 #2
3	Shelton Brothers	"Aura Lee"	Decca 5533	February 17, 1937	June 1938	US Hillbilly 1938 #3 (this melody was used for Elvis Presley's "Love Me Tender")
4	Hoosier Hot Shots	"The Man with the Whiskers"	Vocalion 4502	October 28, 1938	December 1938	US BB 1938 #207, US #11 for 1 week, 2 total weeks, US Hillbilly 1938 #4
5	Roy Acuff with The Crazy Tennesseans	"Great Speckled Bird"	Melotone 70159	October 20, 1936	January 1937	US BB 1938 #236, US #13 for 1 week, 3 total weeks, US Hillbilly 1938 #5
6	Bob Wills and His Texas Playboys	"Steel Guitar Stomp"	Vocalion 3997	June 7, 1937	February 1938	US Hillbilly 1938 #6
7	Gene Autry	"Take Me Back to My Boots and Saddle"	Vocalion 4172	October 18, 1937	June 1938	US Hillbilly 1938 #7
8	Claude Casey's Pinestate Playboys	"Pine State Honky Tonk"	Bluebird 7883	September 27, 1938	October 19, 1938	US Hillbilly 1938 #8
9	Roy Acuff and the Crazy Tennesseans	"Freight Train Blues"	Vocalion 4466	October 21, 1936	November 1938	US Hillbilly 1938 #9
10	Jimmie Rodgers with Lani McIntire's Hawaiians	"The One Rose That's Left in My Heart"	Bluebird B-7280	July 7, 1930	December 1, 1937	US Hillbilly 1938 #10
11	Roy Rogers	"Hi-Ho Silver"	Vocalion 4190	June 15, 1938	July 1938	US BB 1938 #250, US #13 for 1 week, 2 total weeks, US Hillbilly 1938 #10
12	Jimmie Davis with Charles Mitchell	"Meet Me Tonight in Dreamland"	Decca 5616	September 22, 1938	November 1938	US BB 1938 #253, US #13 for 1 week, 12 total weeks, US Hillbilly 1938 #11
13	Light Crust Doughboys	"Beautiful Ohio"	Vocalion 4158	May 14, 1938	June 1938	US BB 1938 #18, US #2 for 1 week, 8 total weeks
14	Hoosier Hot Shots	"Red Hot Fannie"	Vocalion 4289	June 6, 1938	August 1938	US Hillbilly 1938 #13
15	Girls of the Golden West	"Ragtime Cowboy Joe"	Vocalion 4292	February 28, 1938	August 1938	US Hillbilly 1938 #14
16	Jimmie Revard And His Oklahoma Playboys	"Tulsa Waltz"	Bluebird 7371	February 26, 1937	January 19, 1938	US Hillbilly 1938 #15
17	Joe Werner's Ramblers	"Running Around"	Bluebird 4994	April 1, 1938	April 20, 1938	US Hillbilly 1938 #16
18	Bob Wills and His Texas Playboys	"The Maiden's Prayer"	Vocalion 3924	September 23, 1935	February 1938	US Hillbilly 1938 #17
19	W Lee O'Daniel and His Hillbilly Boys	"Beautiful Texas"	Vocalion 4185	May 15, 1938	July 1938	US Hillbilly 1938 #18
20	Cliff Bruner's Texas Wanderers	"Girl Of My Dreams"	Decca 5560	December 8, 1937	July 1938	US Hillbilly 1938 #19
21	Gene Autry	"End of My Round-Up Days"	Vocalion 4146	October 15, 1937	May 1938	US Hillbilly 1938 #20

== Births ==
- January 30 – Norma Jean, female singer of the 1960s and regular on The Porter Wagoner Show from 1961 to 1967.
- March 12 – Lew DeWitt, songwriter and former member of The Statler Brothers (he sang tenor) (died 1990).
- March 18 – Charley Pride, the most successful African-American country music performer, active since the mid-1960s (died 2020).
- April 4 – Norro Wilson, prominent songwriter and record producer (died 2017).
- August 18 – Allen Reynolds, prominent record producer, best known for his association with Garth Brooks.
- August 21 – Kenny Rogers, pop-styled country crooner who has enjoyed hits since the late 1960s (died 2020).
