= Start Cheering =

1938 film by Albert S. Rogell

- Directed by: Albert S. Rogell
- Written by: Eugene Solow; Richard Wormser; Philip Rapp; Corey Ford
- Produced by: Nat Perrin
- Starring: Jimmy Durante; Charles Starrett; Joan Perry; Walter Connolly; Broderick Crawford; Professor Quiz; The Three Stooges; Louis Prima; Chaz Chase; Hal Le Roy
- Cinematography: Joseph Walker
- Edited by: Gene Havlick
- Music by: Morris Stoloff
- Production company: Columbia Pictures
- Distributed by: Columbia Pictures
- Release date: March 3, 1938
- Running time: 78 minutes
- Country: United States
- Language: English

Start Cheering is a 1938 American musical film directed by Albert S. Rogell and starring Jimmy Durante, Charles Starrett, Joan Perry, and Walter Connolly. It is best remembered today for guest appearances throughout the film by The Three Stooges (Curly Howard, Moe Howard, and Larry Fine), who were Columbia Pictures' short subject headliners at the time, as campus firemen. The film's choreography was by Danny Dare.

== Plot ==
Film star Ted Crosley is fed up with Hollywood and quits the movies to enroll in college under an assumed name. While Ted struggles to fit in on campus and tries out for the football team, his frustrated manager Sam Lewis and Lewis's sidekick Willie Gumbatz try to have him expelled from the college so he can resume his Hollywood career. Radio's Professor Quiz is teaching a special course on campus, giving Lewis the idea to promote Crosley's campus activities on network radio. Bandleader Johnny Green is also on campus, lending musical accompaniment to the many songs.

== Cast ==
- Jimmy Durante as Willie Gumbatz
- Charles Starrett as Ted Crosley
- Joan Perry as Jean Worthington
- Walter Connolly as Sam Lewis
- Craig E. Earle as Professor Quiz (billed as Professor Quiz)
- Gertrude Niesen as Sarah
- Raymond Walburn as Dean Worthington
- Broderick Crawford as Biff Gordon
- The Three Stooges as themselves
- Hal Le Roy as Tarzan Biddle, quiz contestant and dancer
- Ernest Truex as Blodgett, Crosley's butler
- Johnny Green as himself, bandleader
- Chaz Chase as Shorty
- Vernon Dent as Empire Studios executive and soda jerk Pops
- Gene Morgan as Coach Burns
- Arthur Hoyt as librarian
- Claire Rochelle as student
- Edward LeSaint as first board overseer
- Lew Davis as team doctor and candy butcher
- Minerva Urecal as Miss Grimley, dean of women
- Lucille Lund as Flossie
- Eddie Fetherston as man at water fountain and man setting up microphone
- Jane Hamilton as student
- Claire Rochelle as student
- Robert Paige (singing voice for Charles Starrett)

== Production ==
Production began in October 1937 under the title Freshman Follies. One of the original songs, "Start Cheering," became the new film title. Many members of Columbia's stock company played incidental roles, and some of them appear twice in different roles and costumes.

Charles Starrett was established as Columbia's cowboy star, and petitioned his employers to cast him in modern-day stories. Start Cheering was Starrett's only opportunity along these lines; Columbia returned him to westerns, and he remained with Columbia until his retirement in 1952.

The ingenue in Start Cheering, Joan Perry, made such an impression on Columbia president Harry Cohn that he proposed marriage to her. They were wed until Cohn's death in 1958.

Specialty performer Chaz Chase does his vaudeville act periodically during the film: he eats everything on his person: pages from books, flowers, buttons, etc.

== See also ==
- List of American films of 1938
- The Three Stooges filmography
