= Gertrude Niesen =

American actress (1911–1975)

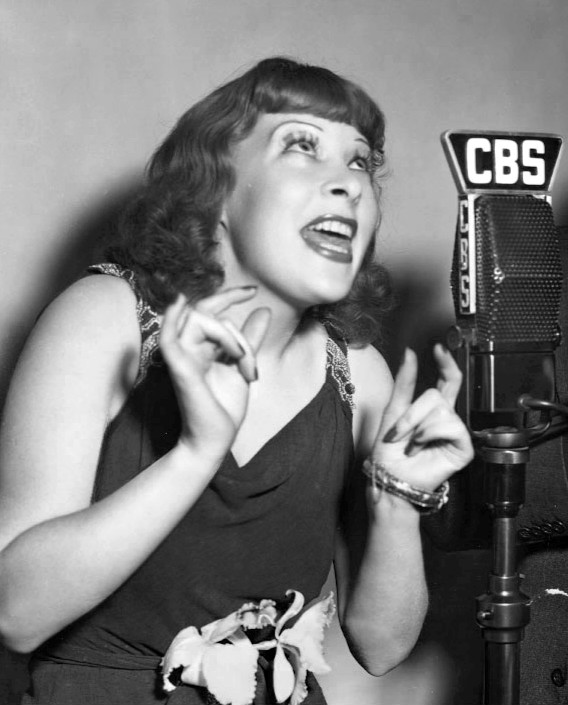
- Niesen on Duffy's Tavern (1940)
- Born: July 8, 1911; New York City, U.S.
- Died: March 27, 1975 (aged 63); Hollywood, California, U.S.
- Other name: Gertrude Nissen
- Occupations: Singer; songwriter; actress
- Years active: 1934–1975
- Spouse: Al Greenfield (m. 1943)

Gertrude Niesen (July 8, 1911 – March 27, 1975) was an American torch singer, actress, comedian, and songwriter who achieved popular success in musicals and films in the 1930s and 1940s.

== Early years ==
Niesen was born aboard ship as her Swedish father and Russian mother returned from a vacation in Europe. As a child, she hoped for a career on stage and began performing in vaudeville. She attended Brooklyn Heights Seminary, where she found and developed an interest in music.

== Career ==
Niesen began singing as a career in the early 1930s, performing on radio and in night clubs. She first appeared on film (credited as Gertrude Nissen) with Roger Wolfe Kahn and His Orchestra and Artie Shaw in a Vitaphone short film, Yacht Party (1932).

On old-time radio, Niesen was the featured singer on The Ex-Lax Big Show on CBS and host of The Show Shop (1942), on NBC-Blue. She left The Ex-Lax Big Show in the summer of 1935 to sing leads in musical productions of the St. Louis Municipal Opera Theatre.

She recorded for Victor, Columbia, and Brunswick in the 1930s, and in 1933 was the first to record the song "Smoke Gets in Your Eyes", by Jerome Kern and Otto Harbach.

She appeared in the Broadway musical Calling All Stars in 1934 and in the Ziegfeld Follies of 1936. Her Broadway credits also include Follow the Girls (1944) and Take a Chance (1932).

Niesen's singing at a cafe in Hollywood led to her signing a contract with Universal. She also began to appear regularly in movies, including Top of the Town (1937), in which she sang four songs, Start Cheering (1938), and A Night at Earl Carroll's (1940), in which she sang a song that she co-wrote, "I Want to Make with the Happy Times". Her other films included Rookies on Parade (1941), This Is the Army (1943), He's My Guy (1943), and The Babe Ruth Story (1948). She co-starred with Jackie Gleason in the 1944 stage musical Follow the Girls, in which she sang "I Want to Get Married", one of her better-known songs. She recorded for Decca Records throughout the 1940s, and released a self-titled LP for the label in 1951. She also appeared on many radio shows and on TV in the early 1950s.

== Personal life and death ==
Niesen married Chicago nightclub owner Al Greenfield in Las Vegas on July 19, 1943. The couple divorced but remarried in 1954, remaining married until Niesen's death in Kaiser Permanente Hospital in Hollywood, California in 1975, aged 63, after a long illness.

== Selected filmography ==
- Start Cheering (1938)
- Rookies on Parade (1941)
- This Is the Army (1943)
- Russian Revels (1943)
- Thumbs Up (1943)
- The Babe Ruth Story (1948)
