= Dominique Heckmes =

Luxembourgish composer and music critic

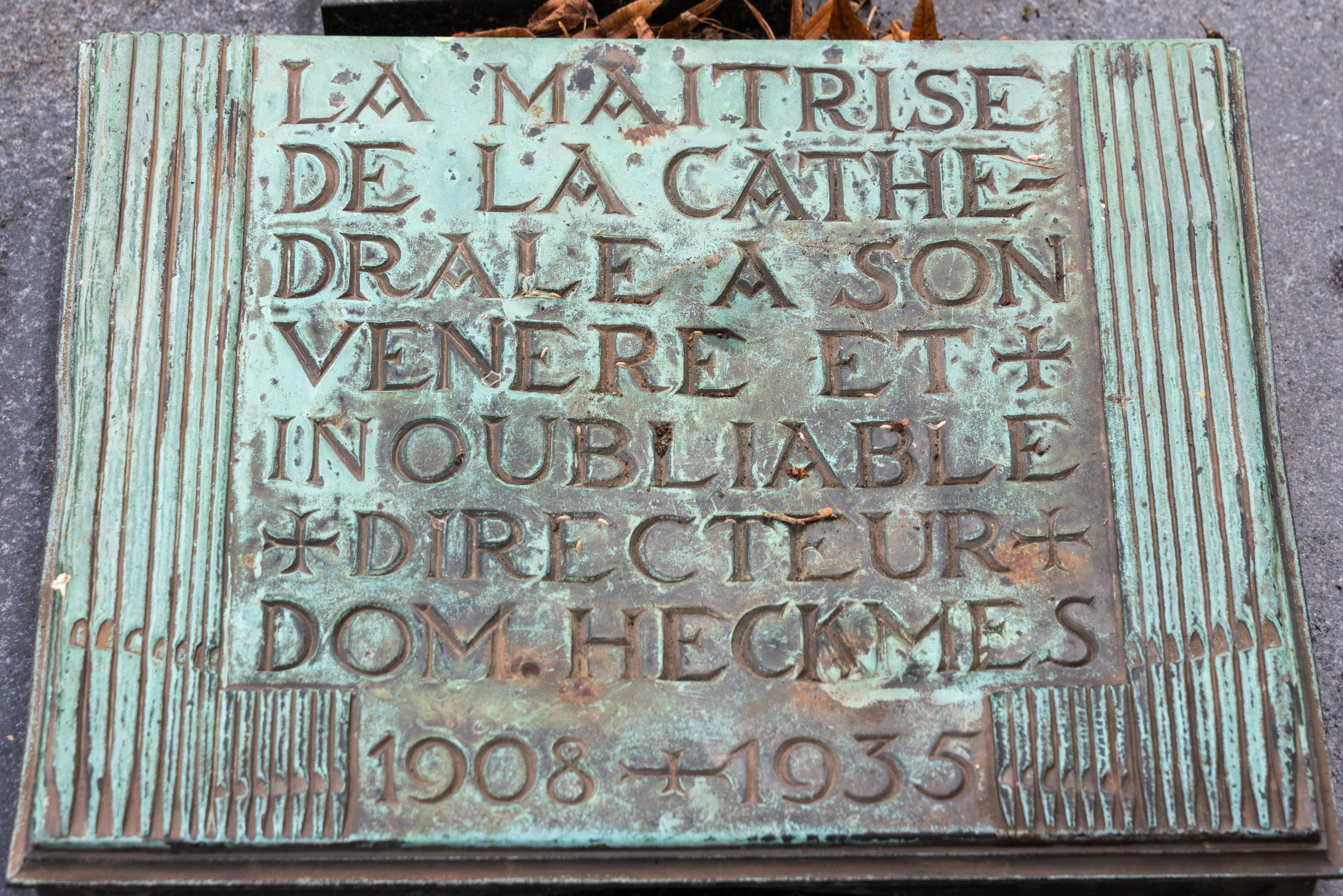
Dominique Heckmes is buried at the Cimetière Notre-Dame, Limpertsberg

Dominique Heckmes (1 September 1878 – 4 February 1938) was a Luxembourgish composer and music critic.
