= That Certain Age =

1938 film by Edward Ludwig

- Theatrical release poster
- Directed by: Edward Ludwig
- Screenplay by: Bruce Manning; Charles Brackett (uncredited); Billy Wilder (uncredited); F. Hugh Herbert (uncredited); Aleen Leslie (Wetstein) (uncredited)
- Story by: F. Hugh Herbert
- Produced by: Joe Pasternak
- Starring: Deanna Durbin; Melvyn Douglas
- Cinematography: Joseph A. Valentine
- Edited by: Bernard W. Burton
- Music by: Frank Skinner (uncredited)
- Production company: Universal Pictures
- Distributed by: Universal Pictures
- Release date: October 7, 1938 (US)
- Running time: 95 minutes
- Country: United States
- Language: English
- Budget: $1 million
- Box office: $2 million (U.S. and Canada rentals)

That Certain Age is a 1938 American musical film directed by Edward Ludwig and starring Deanna Durbin and Melvyn Douglas. Based on a story by Aleen Leslie (Wetstein) that was adapted by F. Hugh Herbert, the film is about a dashing reporter who returns from covering the Spanish Civil War and is invited to spend time at his publisher's home, where his adolescent daughter develops a crush on him. The family does their best to sway the young girl's feelings away from the reporter, but it is a challenge, as she is at "that certain age". Distributed by Universal Pictures, the film received Academy Award nominations for Best Music and Best Sound Recording.

== Plot ==
Alice Fullerton (Durbin) is the 15-year-old daughter of newspaper publisher Bill. She becomes involved with a group of boy scouts, who is led by Ken Warren (Cooper). Ken wants to put on a show to raise money in order to go to scout camp. Alice helps him out with giving him permission to use the family home to rehearse. She is very helpful to them and is eventually given permission to be a part of the act. Meanwhile, Bill offers the house to reporter Vince Bullit, who intends on finishing an article in peace and quiet. Alice fears for her new friends being kicked out of the house and decides to try to scare Vincent away.

She tries to scare Vincent by pretending the house is haunted by evil ghosts. However, Vincent sees through the hoax and confronts Alice. She tells him the whole truth. Vincent sympathizes with them and decides to leave the house, but Bill doesn't want him to. Alice changes her mind when she discovers Vincent is ill. She takes care of him and develops a crush. Ken, who has a crush on Alice, becomes jealous and tries to infuriate her by replacing her with singer Mary Lee.

When an upcoming party is announced, Alice is determined to buy Vincent an expensive gift. She sells some of her stuff and buys a cigarette lighter. At the night of the party, she secretly borrows a dress from her mother to look older. She demands her to take her dress off. Enraged, Alice refuses to talk to anyone. Ken tells Vincent and Alice's parents that she is in love with Vincent. Alice's mother tries to discourage Alice, but she is determined to marry him.

At the night of the party, Alice's mother tells a lie to discourage her daughter. She tells Alice Vincent is married to a reporter called Grace Bristow. Alice finally gives up her crush and is allowed to take over the part in the show when Mary Lee becomes ill.

== Cast ==
- Deanna Durbin as Alice Fullerton
- Melvyn Douglas as Vincent Bullitt
- Jackie Cooper as Kenneth 'Ken' Warren
- Irene Rich as Dorothy Fullerton
- Nancy Carroll as Grace Bristow
- John Halliday as Gilbert Fullerton
- Jackie Searl as Tony
- Juanita Quigley as The Pest (Butch)
- Charles Coleman as Stevens
- Peggy Stewart as Mary Lee

== Production ==
Deanna Durbin made the film when she was fifteen. Her character had a chaste romance in her previous film, Mad About Music. Universal said prior to filming that "there will be a very slight romance for Deanna" in the film. "There will be two boys instead of one and Miss Durbin will indicate a preference for one of them, a good, substantial lad instead of the wealthy, somewhat spoiled youngster. The studio will not allow, naturally, anything resembling a mature romance for the star, one reason being that her vast audience of children over the country do not like it, being prone to smack their lips in derision at the screen."

Jackie Cooper was cast in May; under the deal he agreed to do two more films for Universal.

Word got out that the plot would include Deanna eloping and having a screen kiss. Universal were deluged with protests and these elements were removed.

Filming stated on 15 May 1938. Outdoor scenes were shot on an estate in Pasadena.

== Awards ==
The film was nominated for two Academy Awards:

- Best Original Song (Jimmy McHugh, Harold Adamson, for the song "My Own")
- Best Sound Recording (Bernard B. Brown)
