= 125 Jazz Breaks for Trombone =

1927 trombone songbook

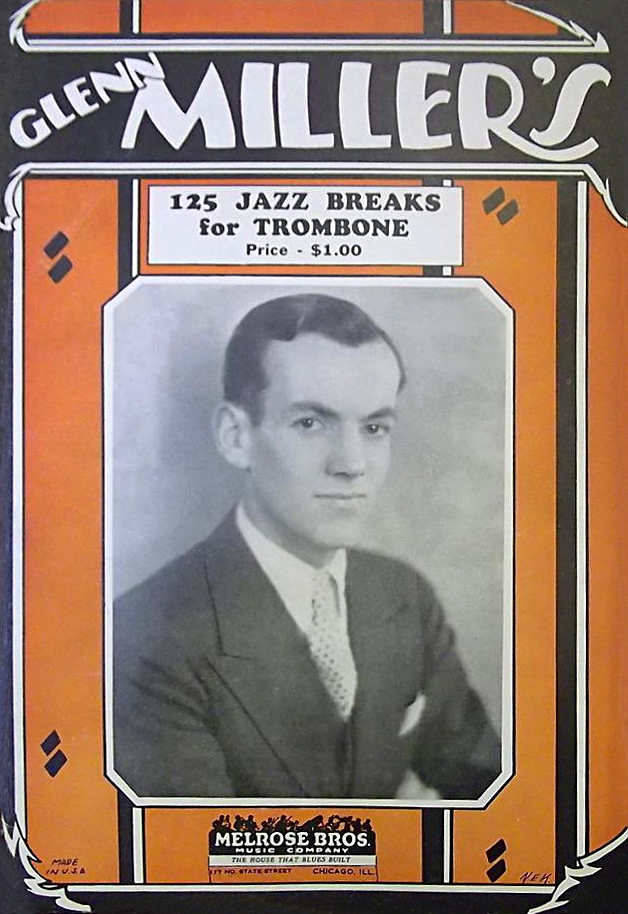
1927 folio or songbook cover. Melrose Bros. Music, Inc., Chicago.

125 Jazz Breaks for Trombone is a 1927 folio or songbook of compositions for trombone by Glenn Miller. The jazz breaks were included in a songbook published by the Melrose Brothers in Chicago and a UK edition by Herman Darewski.

== Background ==
The songbook was copyrighted in 1927 as Glenn Miller's 125 Jazz Breaks for Trombone by the Melrose Brothers Music Company: The House That Blues Built, 177 North State Street, Chicago, Illinois. The score was published in the UK in London by Herman Darewski Music Publishing Co., in 1941, established by the Polish-born composer and conductor. The songbook was softcover and measured 6 3/4 X 10 inches. It consisted of 22 pages. Glenn Miller is pictured on the cover in a black and white photograph. The cover illustration is signed with the initials N.E.K. The rear cover has ads for other Melrose Brothers Music Company publications including ones for Dixieland, Book of Blues, Benny Goodman, Louis Armstrong, and Jelly Roll Morton.

In the publisher's forward it discussed the art of playing jazz, mentioning "Glenn Miller, feature trombonist of Ben Pollack's Victor Recording Orchestra, and author of this book, is recognized everywhere as a finished artist." The back cover contained the description: "Glenn Miller is a feature trombonist with Ben Pollack's Victor Recording Orchestra. Professional musicians everywhere recommend this book. Price: $1.00." The sheet music was advertised in the 1928 Billboard, Volume 40, Page 202. "The Jazz Breaks are works of recognized Jazz artists who have made national reputations. JAZZ BREAKS. Benny Goodman's 125 Jazz Breaks for Sax and Clarinet. $1.00. GLENN MILLER'S 125 Jazz Breaks for Trombone. $1.00." An ad for the sheet music also appeared in the 1928 Metronome, Volume 44, Page 42.

The songbook contained the sheet music for 125 jazz breaks or improvisations for trombone with piano accompaniment in different keys.

The Melrose Bros. Music Company was founded by Walter Melrose and Lester Melrose. Melrose Music also published Louis Armstrong's 125 Jazz Breaks for Cornet and Benny Goodman's 125 Jazz Breaks for the Saxophone and Clarinet in 1928. These folios were also republished by Herman Darewski in the UK.

== Recordings ==
There are no recordings of the trombone solos.

UK edition, Herman Darewski, London.

== Sources ==
- Flower, John (1972). Moonlight Serenade: a bio-discography of the Glenn Miller Civilian Band. New Rochelle, NY: Arlington House. ISBN 0-87000-161-2.
- Miller, Glenn (1943). Glenn Miller's Method for Orchestral Arranging. New York: Mutual Music Society. ASIN: B0007DMEDQ
- Simon, George Thomas (1980). Glenn Miller and His Orchestra. New York: Da Capo paperback. ISBN 0-306-80129-9.
- Simon, George Thomas (1971). Simon Says. New York: Galahad. ISBN 0-88365-001-0.
- Schuller, Gunther (1991). The Swing Era: The Development of Jazz, 1930–1945, Vol. 2. New York: Oxford University Press. ISBN 0-19-507140-9.
- Sudhalter, Richard (1999). Lost Chords. New York: Oxford University Press. ISBN 0-19-514838-X
