= Lawrence Correctional Center =

Prison in Illinois, U.S.

Coordinates: 38.728393°N 87.905946°W

- Interactive map of Lawrence Correctional Center
- Location: 10930 Lawrence Road Sumner, Illinois
- Status: Open
- Security class: Maximum
- Capacity: 2458
- Opened: 2001
- Managed by: Illinois Department of Corrections

The Lawrence Correctional Center is a maximum security adult male prison of the Illinois Department of Corrections in Sumner, Illinois, approximately 65 miles (105 km) north of Evansville, Indiana. The prison opened in November 2001 and has an operational capacity of 2,458 prisoners.

In July 2026, two guards at the prison pleaded guilty to federal charges of conspiring to violate an incarcerated person's civil rights. A press release issued by the U.S. Attorney's Office in the Southern District of Illinois reported that the unnamed prisoner was shackled to a chair and was struck in the face, head, and body by guards. His injuries were extensive and later required reconstructive surgery. U.S. Attorney Steven D. Weinhoeft said that "By their own admissions, these two officers crossed the line into vigilantism." The previous year, a guard had been sentenced to local jail after pleading guilty to bringing drugs into the prison.

In August 2026, about two dozen men went on hunger strike at the prison to protest poor conditions. They claimed that prison staff had failed to provide them with adequate mental health care or out-of-cell time. A Chicago-based civil rights lawyer who had recently visited the prison told the press, "I was talking to one individual today who was placed in a cell in restrictive housing, and there was writing on the wall in someone else’s feces."

== Notable inmates ==
| Inmate Name | Register Number | Status | Details |
|---|---|---|---|
| Jeffrey S. Pelo | R73018 | Ex-police sergeant serving 440 years for raping 4 women. | Jury convicted the 17-year police veteran of 35 counts, including 25 counts of aggravated sexual assault in 2008 - in custody since 2006. |
| Diego Uribe | Y54915 | Serving a life sentence without parole. | Main perpetrator of the 2016 Gage Park murders in which Uribe murdered six of his relatives. |
| Nicholas Sheley | K77192 | Serving a life sentence without parole. | Murdered eight people in Illinois and Missouri in 2008. |
| Alphanso Talley | Y38853 | Being held before trial. | Accused in the 2026 Chicago Endeavor Swedish Hospital shooting. |
