= Copenhagen (song) =

1924 jazz standard composed by Charlie Davis

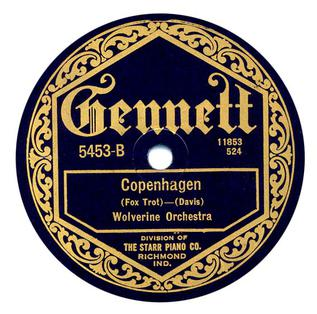
1924 Gennett release by the Wolverine Orchestra featuring Bix Beiderbecke

"Copenhagen" is a jazz standard composed in 1924 by bandleader Charlie Davis and first recorded in that year by the Wolverine Orchestra featuring Bix Beiderbecke in a foxtrot tempo. The title refers to Copenhagen tobacco, favored by Davis's bass player. Lyrics were added by Walter Melrose to the tune, which is a blues in B-flat.

== History ==
On April 5, 1924, Davis's jazz band began an engagement at the Ohio Theater in Indianapolis, Indiana, and performed the song "Copenhagen." That evening, members of The Wolverines, including cornetist Bix Beiderbecke, heard the performance and asked Davis to be allowed to perform the tune in their own engagement. Davis agreed. The Wolverines subsequently worked out their own arrangement in the course of engagements at Indiana University and elsewhere over the following weeks.

The Wolverines recorded it at Gennett Studios in Richmond, Indiana on May 6, 1924. The single was released by Gennett Records as 5453-B and also by Claxtonola Records as 40336-B as by the Jazz Harmonizers. The A side was "Oh Baby", recorded at the same session. "Copenhagen" was published in the same year (in the Wolverines' arrangement) by the Melrose Bros. Music Company of Chicago, Illinois. At least nine other recordings of the song were released in 1924 alone. The Wolverines' recording features a brief cornet solo by Beiderbecke. Fletcher Henderson and His Orchestra recorded "Copenhagen" on October 30, 1924, five months after the Beiderbecke version. The recording by Fletcher Henderson and His Orchestra, arranged by Don Redman, features a solo by Louis Armstrong.

== Personnel ==
The personnel on the session were: Bix Beiderbecke (c); Jimmy Hartwell (cl); George Johnson (ts); Dick Voynow (p); Bob Gillette (bj/g); Min Leibrook (tu); and Vic Moore (dm).

The solos and the number of bars are indicated: Jimmy Hartwell (12) – George Johnson (12) – Bix Beiderbecke (6+8) – Jimmy Hartwell (2) – Min Leibrook (4+4) – Bob Gillette, g (2).

== Notable recordings ==
"Copenhagen"
Recorded on May 6, 1924 by Bix Beiderbecke and the Wolverines, released as Gennett 5453B and Claxtonola 40336B, duration is 2:31

- Bix Beiderbecke and the Wolverines 1924–1925. Timeless, 1993. CD Release 2008.
- Fletcher Henderson and Louis Armstrong 1924–1925. Timeless, 1991. CD Release 2008.
- Essence of Swing: Glen Gray & the Casa Loma Orchestra. Drive Archive, 1997. CD Release 2007.
- The Complete Tommy Dorsey Volume 7. Hallmark, 2010.
- The Benson Orchestra under the direction of Don Bestor, 1924.
- Sammy Stewart. 9/24
- Al Turk. 10/24
- Oriole Orchestra. 10/18/24
- Varsity Eight. 10/22/24
- New Orleans Jazz Band. 10/23/24
- California Ramblers. 10/23/24
- Arkansas Travellers. 11/19/24
- Savoy Orpheons. 1/21/25
- Alex Hyde. 6/25
- Julian Fuhs Follies Band. 6/25
- Sidney Bechet
- Bud Freeman
- Earl Hines
- Kid Ory
- Artie Shaw
- Dorsey Brothers Orchestra
- Theresa Brewer. 1949

== Sources ==
- Crawford, Richard, and Magee, Jeffrey. Jazz Standards on Record, 1900–1942: A Core Repertory. Chicago: Center for Black Music Research, 1992.
- Evans, Phil. Interview with Fritz Morris, n.d. Accessed May 30, 2013.
- Haim, Albert. "Copyin' Bix: Cornet Solos From Bix Beiderbecke's First Three Recording Sessions." Accessed May 30, 2013.
- Magee, Jeffrey. "Revisiting Fletcher Henderson's 'Copenhagen'" Journal of the American Musicological Society, Vol. 48, No. 1 (Spring, 1995), pp. 42–66.
- Rust, Brian. Jazz Records, 1897–1942. Chigwell, Essex: Storyville Publications, 1982.
- Schuller, Gunther. Early Jazz: Its Roots and Musical Development. Oxford University Press, U.S., 1986.
