= Lee Martin (writer) =

American author

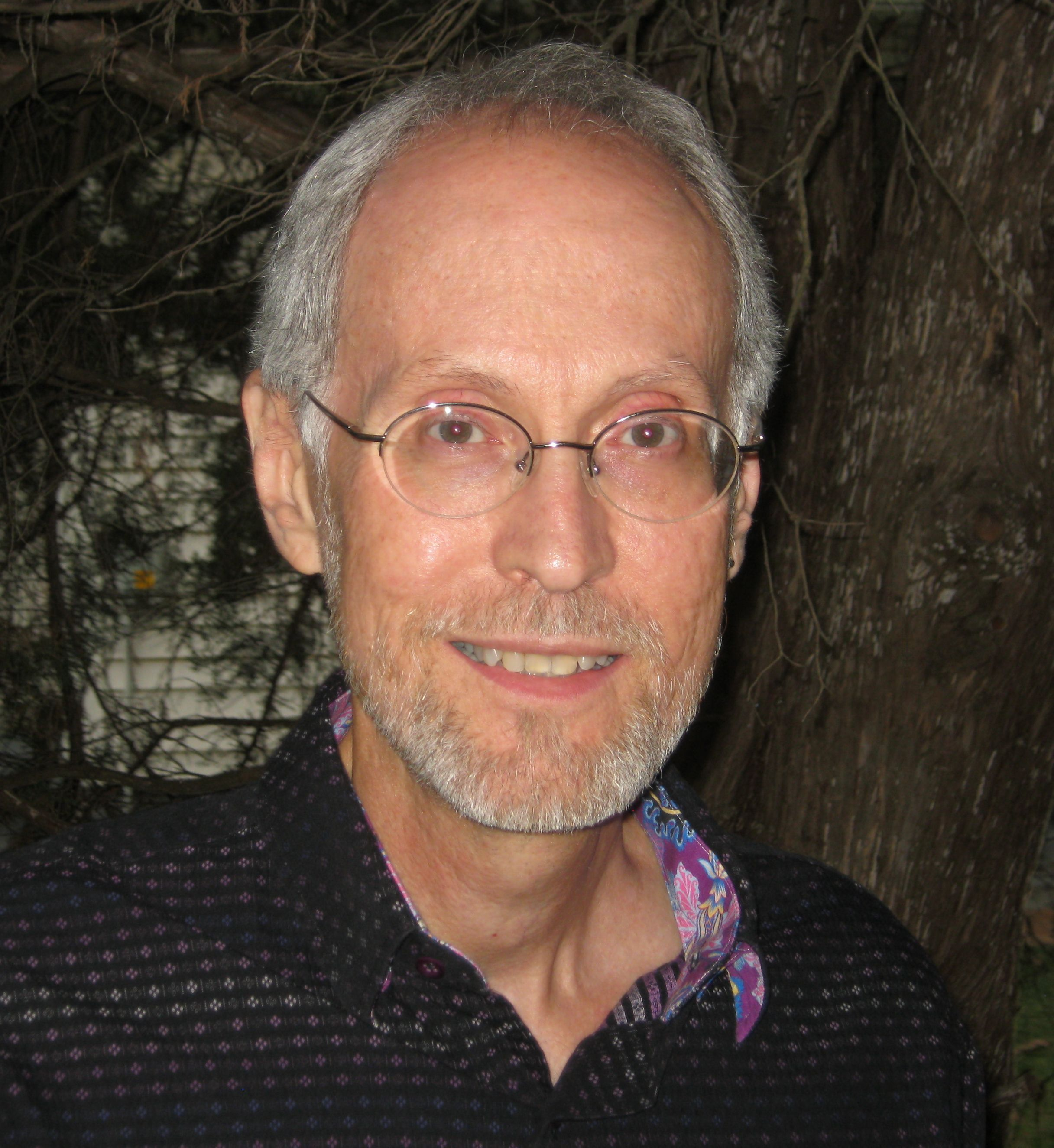
Lee Martin Book Jacket Photo from Late One Night.

Lee Martin is an American author. Born in Illinois, he lived on a farm ten miles from Sumner, which he regards as his home town. He lived in Oak Forest, Illinois, and attended Kimberly Heights Elementary School, where his mother worked as a teacher, and Arbor Park Middle School from 1963 to 1969. Martin was nominated for the Pulitzer Prize for Fiction in 2006 for his novel The Bright Forever and has published five novels, three memoirs, two story collections, and a craft book. He teaches in Ohio State University's creative writing program and lives in Columbus, Ohio with his wife, Cathy, and Stella the Cat. He earned his B.A. at Eastern Illinois University, an MFA at the University of Arkansas and a PhD at the University of Nebraska–Lincoln.

== Books ==
- Traps (1989)
- The Least You Need to Know: Stories (1996)
- Quakertown (2002)
- Turning Bones (2003)
- The Bright Forever (2005)
- River of Heaven: A Novel (2009)
- From Our House: A Memoir (2009)
- Such a Life (American Lives) (2012)
- Break the Skin: A Novel (2012)
- Late One Night: A Novel (2016)
- Telling Stories (2017)
- The Mutual UFO Network (2018)
- Yours, Jean (2020)
- Gone the Hard Road (2021)
- The Glassmaker's Wife (2022)
- The Evening Shades (2025)
