= Rock Falls, Illinois =

City in Whiteside County, Illinois, US

Rock Falls
- City
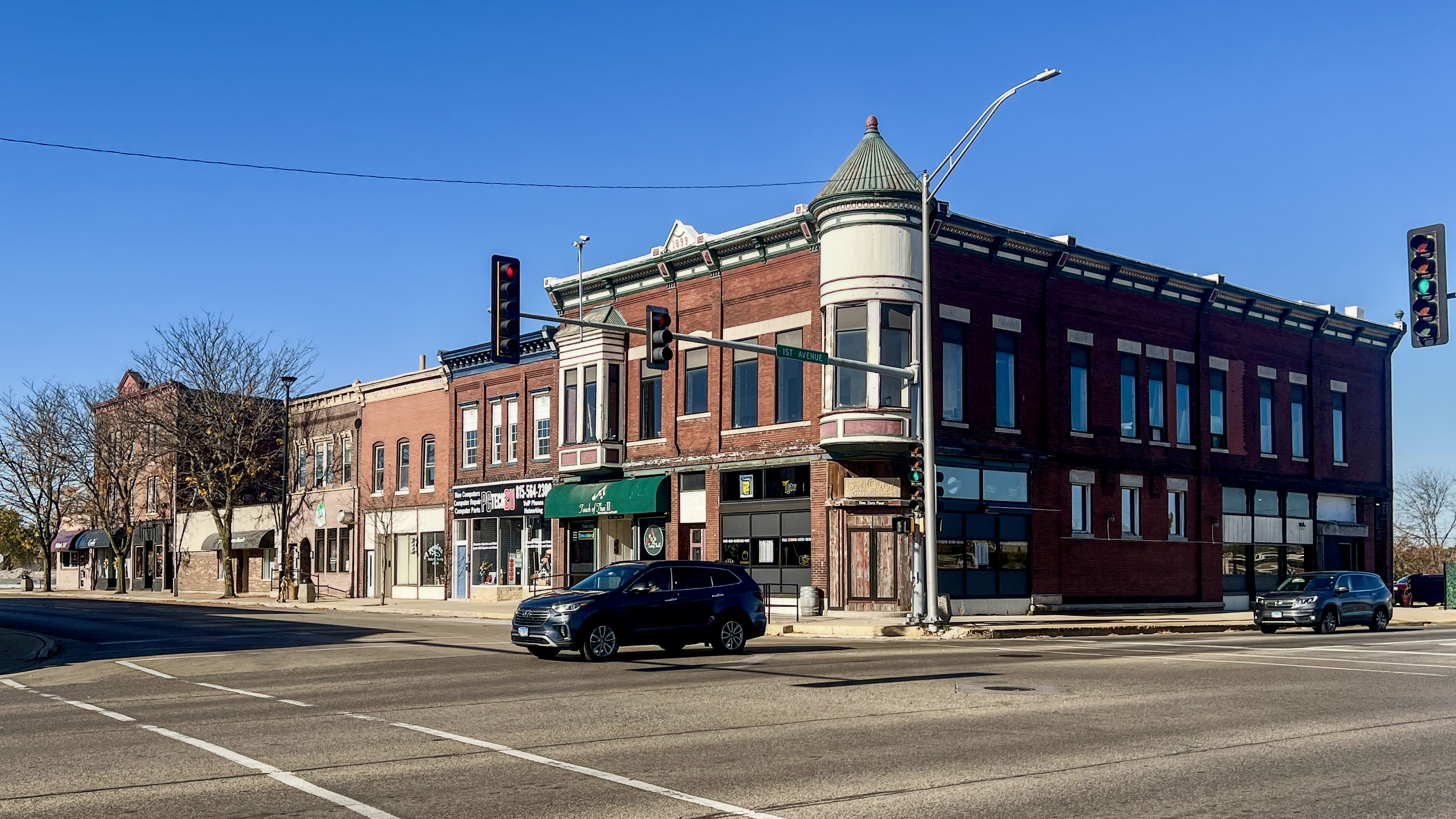
- View of downtown buildings in Rock Falls, IL

- Location of Rock Falls in Whiteside County, Illinois.
- Coordinates: 41°46′21″N 89°41′34″W
- Country: United States
- State: Illinois
- County: Whiteside
- Founder: A.P. Smith

Government
  - Type: Mayor-council
  - Mayor: Rodney Kleckler

Area
  - Total: 4.12 sq mi (10.68 km^{2})
  - Land: 3.98 sq mi (10.32 km^{2})
  - Water: 0.14 sq mi (0.36 km^{2})
- Elevation: 646 ft (197 m)

Population (2020)
  - Total: 8,789
  - Density: 2,206.7/sq mi (852.02/km^{2})
- Time zone: UTC−6 (CST)
  - Summer (DST): UTC−5 (CDT)
- ZIP code: 61071
- Area code: 815
- FIPS code: 17-64928
- GNIS feature ID: 2396397
- Website: rockfalls61071.net

Rock Falls is a city in Whiteside County, Illinois, United States. The recorded population was 8,606 at the 2020 census, down 7.12% from 9,266 in 2010. The city is located on the Rock River, directly opposite its twin city of Sterling.

== History ==
Rock Falls was initially part of the Town of Sterling, created in 1838. In 1867, Augustus P. Smith purchased the rights to use the Rock River's hydroelectric power on the south bank, along with 65 acres of land on the river. Smith hired John Arey to survey the land, who soon platted the town in 1868. Rock Falls was incorporated into a village on January 26, 1869, and then incorporated into a city on April 16, 1889.

Due to low water levels in the Hennepin Canal, Illinois planners constructed a feeder canal with its mouth on the south bank of the Rock River. Initially, Dixon was proposed to be the location of the mouth, but surveyor Frank E. Andrews argued that the canal would be 11 miles shorter if the mouth were to be in Rock Falls, which was soon accepted. The canal officially opened on October 24, 1907, with an accompanying ceremony of almost 25,000 attendants, a 2 ½ mile long street parade, and a large aquatic parade to commemorate the opening, with Governor Charles S. Deneen in attendance.

In 1927, debate began on merging the City of Rock Falls with the neighboring City of Sterling. Supporters of the merge cited the severe lack of public services such as a library and hospital, while opponents argued that the merge would result in higher taxes for the residents of Rock Falls. On November 22, 1927, Rock Falls voted in a referendum on whether or not to merge with the City of Sterling, with the referendum failing with 69.7% of residents voting against.

Due to industrial decline throughout the Rust Belt of the United States beginning in the 1970s, Manufacturing industries in the city began declining, along with the population. Heavily reliant on Sterling's industry, Rock Falls suffered in the 2000s following the closure of Northwestern Steel and Wire in 2001, RB&W in 2003, Lawrence Brothers Manufacturing in 2006, and National MFG Co. in 2010. Due to the Great Recession, more businesses in the region closed, with the poverty rate of Rock Falls reaching 19.6% which continued to increase.

== Geography ==
Rock Falls is separated from its twin city, Sterling, to the North by the Rock River.

According to the 2010 census, Rock Falls has a total area of 3.795 square miles (9.83 km^{2}), of which 3.66 square miles (9.48 km^{2}) (or 96.44%) is land and 0.135 square miles (0.35 km^{2}) (or 3.56%) is water.

== Demographics ==
Historical population
Census	Pop.	Note	%±
1870	471		—
1880	894		89.8%
1890	1,900		112.5%
1900	2,176		14.5%
1910	2,657		22.1%
1920	2,927		10.2%
1930	3,893		33.0%
1940	4,987		28.1%
1950	7,983		60.1%
1960	10,261		28.5%
1970	10,287		0.3%
1980	10,633		3.4%
1990	9,654		−9.2%
2000	9,580		−0.8%
2010	9,266		−3.3%
2020	8,789		−5.1%
U.S. Decennial Census

=== Racial and ethnic composition ===
Rock Falls city, Illinois – Racial and ethnic composition Note: the US Census treats Hispanic/Latino as an ethnic category. This table excludes Latinos from the racial categories and assigns them to a separate category. Hispanics/Latinos may be of any race.
Race / Ethnicity (NH = Non-Hispanic)	2020	2010	2000	1990	1980
White alone (NH)	74.4% (6,542)	81.4% (7,541)	86.2% (8,258)	88.6% (8,557)	88.9% (9,456)
Black alone (NH)	1.9% (169)	1.3% (122)	0.7% (71)	0.8% (76)	0.2% (25)
American Indian alone (NH)	0.2% (18)	0.2% (19)	0.4% (34)	0.2% (21)	0.1% (15)
Asian alone (NH)	0.4% (34)	0.3% (26)	0.2% (23)	0.4% (34)	1.1% (121)
Pacific Islander alone (NH)	0% (2)	0% (0)	0% (0)		
Other race alone (NH)	0.4% (33)	0% (2)	0% (3)	0% (2)	0.1% (7)
Multiracial (NH)	5.3% (468)	1.7% (161)	0.9% (85)	—	—
Hispanic/Latino (any race)	17.3% (1,523)	15.1% (1,395)	11.5% (1,106)	10% (964)	9.5% (1,009)

=== 2020 census ===
As of the 2020 census, Rock Falls had a population of 8,789. The median age was 42.3 years. 22.9% of residents were under the age of 18 and 19.7% of residents were 65 years of age or older. For every 100 females there were 94.4 males, and for every 100 females age 18 and over there were 92.2 males age 18 and over.

99.6% of residents lived in urban areas, while 0.4% lived in rural areas.

There were 3,821 households in Rock Falls, of which 27.1% had children under the age of 18 living in them. Of all households, 34.5% were married-couple households, 22.4% were households with a male householder and no spouse or partner present, and 33.3% were households with a female householder and no spouse or partner present. About 35.9% of all households were made up of individuals and 16.1% had someone living alone who was 65 years of age or older.

There were 4,244 housing units, of which 10.0% were vacant. The homeowner vacancy rate was 2.2% and the rental vacancy rate was 10.8%.

The most reported ancestries in 2020 were:

- German (21.8%)
- English (15.9%)
- Mexican (15%)
- Irish (14.1%)
- Italian (3.4%)
- African American (2.6%)
- Dutch (2.1%)
- Scottish (1.8%)
- Swedish (1.8%)
- French (1.5%)

=== 2000 census ===
At the 2000 census there were 9,580 people, 3,895 households, and 2,559 families living in the city. The population density was 2,888.0 inhabitants per square mile (1,115.1/km^{2}). There were 4,098 housing units at an average density of 1,235.4 per square mile (477.0/km^{2}). The racial makeup of the city was 91.78% White, 0.88% African American, 0.45% Native American, 0.26% Asian, 4.71% from other races, and 1.92% from two or more races. Hispanic or Latino of any race were 11.54%.

Of the 3,895 households 30.7% had children under the age of 18 living with them, 47.5% were married couples living together, 13.7% had a female householder with no husband present, and 34.3% were non-families. 29.4% of households were one person and 13.9% were one person aged 65 or older. The average household size was 2.43 and the average family size was 2.99.

The age distribution was 25.5% under the age of 18, 9.0% from 18 to 24, 27.6% from 25 to 44, 21.9% from 45 to 64, and 15.9% 65 or older. The median age was 36 years. For every 100 females, there were 90.8 males. For every 100 females age 18 and over, there were 87.5 males.

The median household income was $34,442 and the median family income was $41,803. Males had a median income of $32,733 versus $21,092 for females. The per capita income for the city was $16,524. About 10.3% of families and 11.5% of the population were below the poverty line, including 14.8% of those under age 18 and 6.8% of those age 65 or over.

== Education ==
Rock Falls has four school districts. Most of Rock Falls is in Rock Falls Elementary School District 13, while portions in the east are in East Coloma-Nelson Consolidated Elementary School District 20, and a very small portion of the municipal limits is in Montmorency Community Consolidated School District 145. All of Rock Falls is in Rock Falls Township High School District 301.

Rock Falls Elementary School District #13 consists of Riverdale Preschool Center, Dillon Elementary School, Merrill Intermediate School, and Rock Falls Middle School. East Coloma-Nelson CESD #20 operates East Coloma-Nelson grade school. Montmorency CCSD #145 operates Montmorency grade school. Thome School serves as the town's special needs institution.

The Roman Catholic Diocese of Rockford runs one school in the city: St. Andrew's School, serving as both grade school and middle school. This school serves a local parish, St. Andrew Catholic Church.

== Arts and culture ==
The City of Rock Falls hosts many annual events each year. Some of the most popular events are: Percussion-Paloosa (February), Rock Falls Spring Challenge (May), Bass Pro Shop's Big Cat Quest Catfish Tournament (June), Summer Splash (June), River Chase Boat Races (June), Pink Heals Tour (July), Whiteside County Barn Tour (July), Touch a Truck (August), Fiesta Days (September), Bridge the Communities 5K/10K race (September), The Hennepin Hundred 100k Ultra race (October) and Hometown Holidays (November).

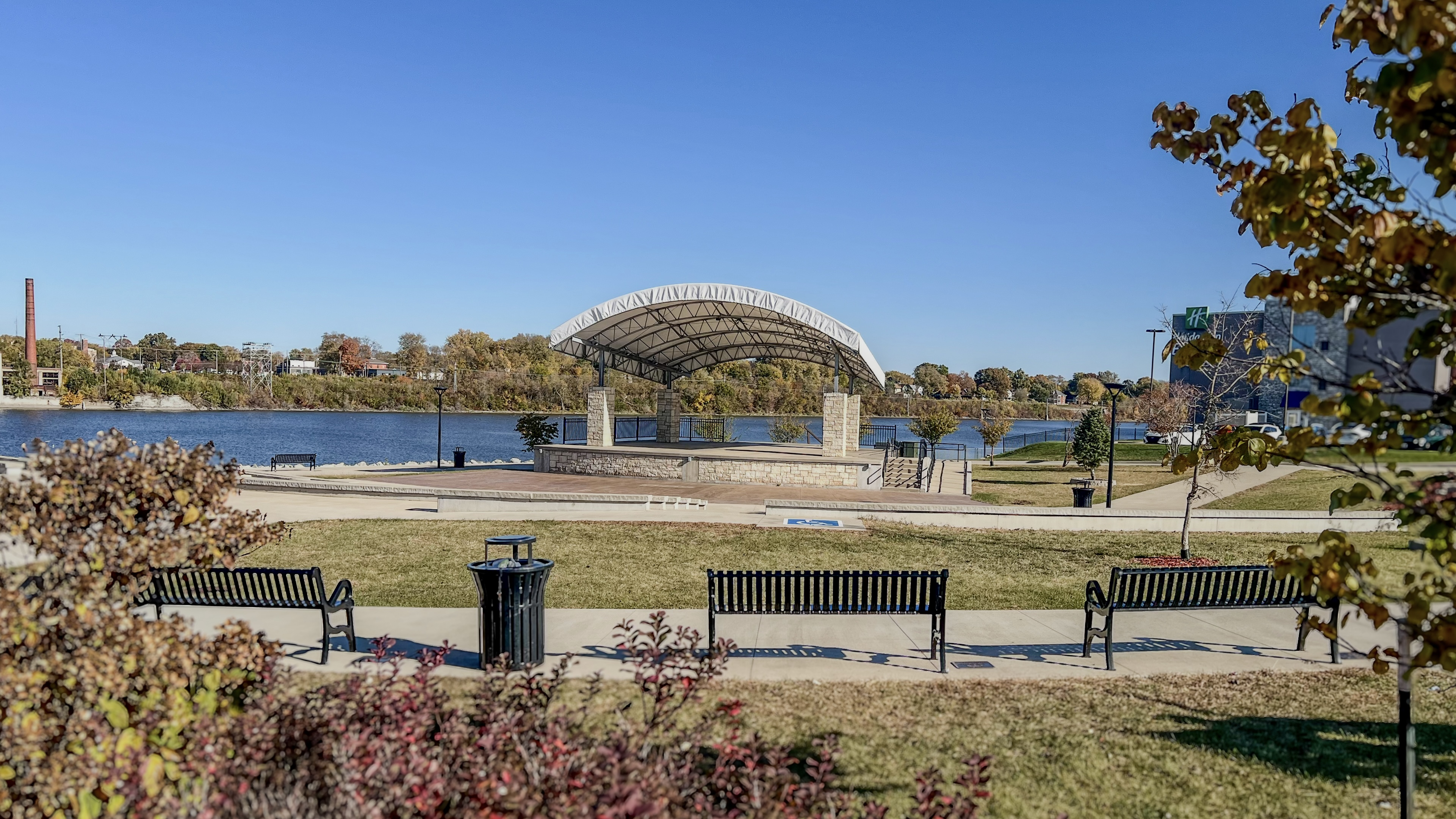
View of riverfront bandshell in Rock Falls, IL

== Parks and recreation ==
The City of Rock Falls and Township of Coloma have 16 parks spanning over 100 acres (40 ha) in which one can use baseball diamonds, basketball courts, tennis courts, disc golf, open fields, playground equipment, pavilions, picnic areas, or a bandshell. Also, with the close proximity of the Rock River, the Hennepin Canal, and a lake in Centennial Park where one can use boats ramps, canoes, paddle boats, or engage in fishing.

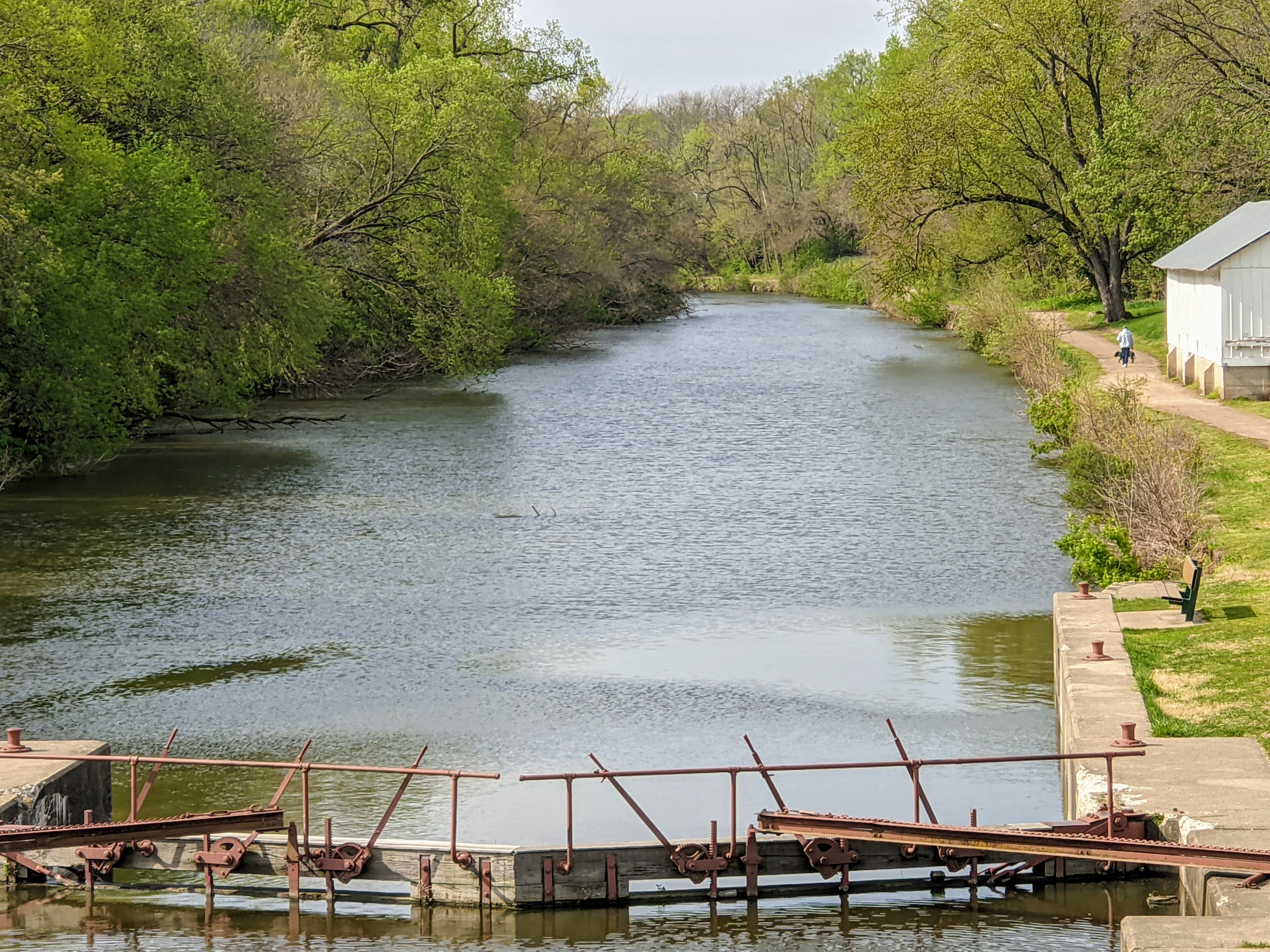
Hennepin Canal, looking south from its origin on the Rock River in Rock Falls, Illinois.

Two eighteen-hole mid-range disc golf courses are located in Rock Falls: Nims Park and Joshua Park.

== Infrastructure ==
=== Airport ===
The Whiteside County Airport is located about 2 mi (3.2 km) south of the city.

=== Major highways ===
Major highways in Rock Falls include:

- Interstate 88
- U.S. Route 30
- Illinois Route 40
- Illinois Route 110

=== Electric utility ===
Rock Falls has a municipal electrical system, which generates its own power using a 2 megawatt low-head hydro-electric plant on the Rock River. Current electric rate is 67% higher than Com Ed. Water and sewer minimum charge is now up to $71.85.

== Notable people ==
- Louie Bellson (1924–2009), drummer, creator of the double bass drumkit
- Seth Blair (born 1989), minor league baseball player for the Boston Red Sox
- Frank Harts (born 1979), actor
- Cal Howe (1924–2008), professional baseball player for the Chicago Cubs
- Jake Junis (born 1992), professional baseball player for several teams
- Otis Adelbert Kline (1891–1946), songwriter and adventure novelist
- Gary Kolb (1940–2019), professional baseball player for several teams
- Zelma O'Neal (1903–1989), actress and singer
- Nicholas Sheley (born 1979), murderer, raised in Rock Falls.
- Mariya Takeuchi (born 1955), singer and songwriter
- David Turk, 21st United States deputy secretary of energy
