= Nicholas Troy Sheley =

American spree killer (born 1979)

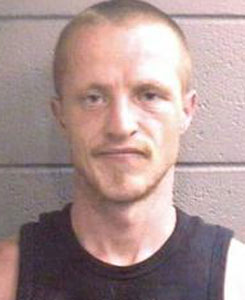
- Born: July 31, 1979 (age 47); Sterling, Illinois, U.S.
- Spouse: Holly Sheley (m. 2008; div. 2013)
- Status: Incarcerated
- Conviction: First degree murder (8 counts)
- Penalty: Life imprisonment without the possibility of parole

Details
- Date: June 23–30, 2008
- Locations: Illinois and Missouri, United States
- Killed: 8
- Weapon: Hammer
- Imprisoned at: Lawrence Correctional Center

Nicholas Troy Sheley (born July 31, 1979) is an American spree killer. He is serving life in prison for six murders in Illinois and two other murders in Missouri. He was arrested on July 1, 2008, in Granite City, Illinois. A $25,000 reward was offered for information leading to his arrest. Federal authorities charged him with unlawful flight to avoid prosecution.

== Early life ==
Sheley, of Rock Falls, Illinois, had been arrested frequently since adolescence for crimes ranging from marijuana possession to domestic battery. He and his ex-wife Holly married on May 10, 2008. The couple had been dating since 2004. They later divorced in December 2013 after his arrest.

== Murder spree ==
Sheley's murder spree began on June 23, 2008, when he killed 93-year-old Russell Reed in his hometown, Sterling. Police say Sheley was looking for money to buy cocaine and bludgeoned Reed. Reed's body was found in the trunk of his car three days later.

On June 28, Sheley encountered 65-year-old Ronald Randall at a car wash in Galesburg, Illinois, where Randall had gone to clean his truck; Sheley murdered him and stole his truck, hiding his body behind a grocery store before leaving town. That same night, Sheley drove Randall's truck to Rock Falls and murdered Kenny Ulve, 25, Brock Branson, 29, his fiancée, Kilynna Blake, 20, and her son Dayan, 2, in an apartment. All four victims had been bludgeoned with a hammer. Sheley's DNA was found in the apartment, and he was seen wearing some of the victims' clothing the next day. Holly Sheley testified that she and her husband had sex the night of the murders by a canal, not in the truck, and that the truck's cab was covered in blood. The bodies of Ronald Randall and the four victims in Rock Falls were not discovered until two days later, on June 30.

Sheley fled to Festus, Missouri, after the Rock Falls murders and on June 29 allegedly committed his last two murders. The victims were Tom and Jill Estes, both 54, of Sherwood, Arkansas. They had attended a graduation party and were allegedly attacked by Sheley outside the hotel where they were staying. Sheley put their bodies in Randall's truck and hid them behind a gas station.

== Arrest and legal proceedings ==
The night before his arrest, Sheley was seen outside of a St. Louis Cardinals game, where he asked to use a tailgater's cell phone. Sheley also requested that the man delete the phone numbers. However, police were able to trace the call back to a drug house in the Kirkwood area. On July 1, Sheley was arrested outside of a bar in Granite City, Illinois, after bar patrons recognized him from news reports and contacted the local police. He surrendered peacefully.

Sheley was convicted of the first-degree murder of Randall in Knox County, Illinois, on September 29, 2011. His trial for the murder of Reed began in Whiteside County, Illinois, on October 22, 2012. He was found guilty on November 6 of charges of first-degree murder, home invasion, and residential burglary and was sentenced on January 16, 2013, to life imprisonment for the murder, as well as 30 years for home invasion and 15 years for residential burglary. He was an inmate at Pontiac Correctional Center, in Pontiac, Illinois.

Sheley was also found guilty of first-degree murder in a Rock Island County court on May 29, 2014, for the four murders in Rock Falls. He was sentenced on August 11, 2014. His wife, Holly Sheley, testified against him in exchange for immunity. Prosecutors have said that Sheley killed the four victims in Rock Falls after finding out that his wife was having an affair with Brock Branson.

In February 2015, Sheley was extradited to Jefferson County, Missouri, to stand trial for the murders of the Estes. Prosecutors sought the death penalty. Unlike Missouri, Illinois does not have a death penalty.

In January 2016, Sheley appeared in court represented by public defenders, asking that the trial be moved to another town to secure an unbiased jury. The judge advised that he would rule later in the week. The judge denied both the change of venue request and a motion for a new judge.

In January 2017, a trial date was set in Missouri. The jury selection was scheduled for January 4–5, 2018, followed by a two-week trial starting on January 8. Later in October 2017, Sheley pleaded guilty to the two murders in Missouri to avoid a possible death sentence. He is now serving his sentence at Lawrence Correctional Center in Illinois.

== Victims ==
=== Confirmed ===
Name	Age	Location	Date
Russell Reed	93	Sterling, Illinois	June 23, 2008
Ronald Randall	65	Galesburg, Illinois	June 28, 2008
Brock Branson	29	Rock Falls, Illinois	June 29, 2008
Kilynna Blake	20	Rock Falls, Illinois	June 29, 2008
Dayan Blake	2	Rock Falls, Illinois	June 29, 2008
Kenneth Ulve	25	Rock Falls, Illinois	June 29, 2008
Jill Estes	54	Festus, Missouri	June 30, 2008
Tom Estes	54	Festus, Missouri	June 30, 2008

== See also ==
- List of rampage killers in the United States
