= Whiteside County Airport =

Airport in Rock Falls, Illinois, US

Whiteside County Airport Joseph H. Bittorf Field
- IATA: SQI; ICAO: KSQI

Summary
- Airport type: Public
- Serves: Rock Falls, Illinois
- Time zone: UTC−06:00 (-6)
  - Summer (DST): UTC−05:00 (-5)
- Elevation AMSL: 648 ft / 198 m
- Coordinates: 41°44′25″N 089°40′51″W
- Website: http://www.whitesidecountyairport.org
- Interactive map of Whiteside County Airport

Runways
| Direction | Length | | Surface |
| Direction | ft | m | Surface |
|---|---|---|---|
| 7/25 | 6,500 | 1,981 | Asphalt |
| 18/36 | 3,900 | 1,189 | Asphalt |

Statistics (2021)
- Aircraft operations: 33,000
- Based aircraft: 42

The Whiteside County Airport (IATA: SQI, ICAO: KSQI), also known as Joseph H. Bittorf Field, is a public-use airport serving Rock Falls, Illinois, United States, as well as the Sauk Valley and Dixon area.

== Facilities and aircraft ==
The airport has two runways. Runway 7/25 measures 6499 x 150 ft (1981 x 46 m) and is friction. This length makes the runway capable of serving aircraft from the Boeing 737 and Airbus A320 families.

The other runway, 18/36, is 3900 x 100 ft (1189 x 30 m) and is also asphalt.

The airport's FBO is Sauk Valley Aviation. The airport offers fueling and parking services in addition to aircraft rental and flight training; aircraft maintenance, modifications, cleaning, and parts; and pilot services like a courtesy car, lounge, and WiFi.

Based on the 12-month period ending March 31, 2021, the airport averages 90 aircraft operations per day, or roughly 33,000 per year, consisting of 98% general aviation, 2% air taxi, and <1% military. For that same time period, there are 42 aircraft based on the field: 40 single-engine and 2 multi-engine airplanes.

== Accidents and incidents ==
- On July 27, 2006, a Beechcraft Baron executed a forced landing at Whiteside County Airport. The aircraft had been in a holding pattern following a missed approach at the airport when an engine failed. Instrument Meteorological Conditions prevailed at the time. The pilot received serious injuries. The probable cause of the accident was determined to be fuel exhaustion due to the pilot's failure to ensure an adequate supply of fuel for the flight.
- On July 23, 2021, a Cessna 150 flown by aviation YouTube personality Dan Gryder crashed while flying at the Whiteside County Airshow near the airport. The aircraft performed an off-airport emergency landing and flipped onto its top. Neither Gryder nor his passenger were injured, and both refused medical treatment. The cause of the crash is under investigation.

== See also ==
- List of airports in Illinois
