= Unlisted Owner =

- Directed by: Jed Brian
- Written by: Jed Brian; Tyler Landers
- Story by: Jed Brian
- Produced by: Jed Brian; Gavin Groves; Tyler Landers; Brent Perrott
- Starring: Jed Brian; Chris Ash; Levi Atkins; Chloe Benedict; Haidee Corona
- Cinematography: Brent Perrott
- Edited by: Jed Brian; Brent Perrott
- Production company: Lawford County Productions
- Distributed by: Tomcat Films/Summer Hill Films
- Release date: November 23, 2013
- Running time: 74 minutes
- Country: United States
- Language: English

Unlisted Owner is a 2013 American found footage thriller horror film written and directed by Jed Brian and co-written by Tyler Landers and produced by Lawford County Productions. Unlisted Owner has been edited as crime scene video evidence, with law enforcement placards showing the date time and whose camera was filming in the next sequence. Lawford County Productions signed a distribution agreement for Unlisted Owner with Tom Cat Films in October 2016.

== Plot ==
The film takes place in a small Illinois community in fictional Lawford County that has been shaken to the core by the murders of the Roth family who had recently purchased a house with a dark history unaware to many. A radio broadcast of the deaths is heard by a group of friends Gavin Landers (Gavin Groves), Griffin Potts (Griffin Groves), Tyler Brian (Tyler Landers), Jed Groves (Jed Brian), Andrea Mills (Andrea Potts), and Haidee Summers (Haidee Corona), who realize the murders are only a mile away from where they are going camping this weekend. Since the campsite is so close to the murder scene, the group of friends decide to go back and investigate themselves, leading to an eventful night they can only hope they will survive.

== Cast ==
- Jed Brian as Jed Groves
- Chris Ash as Chris Martin
- Levi Atkins as "The Owner"
- Chloe Benedict as Chloe Roth
- Haidee Corona as Haidee Summers
- Gavin Groves as Gavin Landers
- Griffin Groves as Griffin Potts
- Tanner Hoke as Tanner Lweis
- Tyler Landers as Tyler Brian
- Mark Nation-Ellis as Mark Roth
- Amber Newlin as Amber Roth
- Andrea Potts as Andrea Mills
- Graycie Sapp as Graycie Roth
- Travis Trainner as Officer Travis Diggs
- Trenton Wilkinson as Trenton Roth
- Kyle Lafreniere as Clint Buckler (Uncredited)

== Production ==
Production began in July 2011 and completed May 2013. His directorial debut, Brian spent two years shooting and editing the film. It was filmed in and around Sumner, Illinois.

== Release ==
The film premiered to a focus group in Vincennes, Indiana on June 14 and 15, 2013, and screened again November 24, 2013 in Evansville, before screening at festivals such as American Film Market in November 2015. Unlisted Owner was released on Amazon.com on November 14, 2017.

== Reception ==
The Horror Syndicate said, "I give UNLISTED OWNER a score of 6.1/10. It’s not perfect, certainly, and the score would be much higher if more of the movie was like the last half hour, but if you like found footage flicks, or slashers, I would recommend giving this a watch."
