= 2026 Chicago Endeavor Swedish Hospital shooting =

Shooting of two police officers in Chicago, Illinois

- Location: 41.97538°N 87.69933°W; Endeavor Swedish Hospital, Chicago, Illinois, US
- Date: April 25, 2026 c. 10:50 a.m.
- Weapon: 10mm Glock pistol
- Deaths: 1
- Injuries: 1
- Accused: Alphanso Talley

On April 25, 2026, two police officers with the Chicago Police Department (CPD) were shot at the Endeavor Swedish Hospital in Chicago, Illinois. One officer was killed, and another was critically injured.

== Shooting ==
The suspect allegedly was arrested earlier in the day for robbery, and was receiving medical treatment at the Endeavor Swedish Hospital. He was being transported in the Albany Park community area by two municipal police officers. He hid a 10mm Glock pistol under a blanket, then shot the officers who were transporting him, killing one and injuring another, then escaped into nearby homes. The suspect was captured by a Chicago Police SWAT team.

== Victims ==
John Bartholomew, a 38-year-old who had been with the Chicago Police Department for ten years, was killed, and another officer was critically injured.

== Accused ==
Alphanso Talley, a 26-year-old convicted felon, was charged with the murder of Bartholomew and the attempted murder of a second police officer. Talley had been arrested earlier the day of the shooting for robbing a convenience store and pistol-whipping a clerk. He had previously been arrested for armed robbery and carjacking in April 2025, and was released on electronic monitoring.

An Indiana woman was also charged in relation to the incident, for making false statements about purchasing the gun used in the shooting.
