= Lester Melrose =

American producer of Chicago blues records (1891–1968)

- Born: Lester Franklin Melrose; December 14, 1891; Sumner, Illinois, U.S.
- Died: April 12, 1968 (aged 76) Lake, Florida, U.S.
- Genres: Chicago blues
- Occupations: Record producer; songwriter; arranger; talent scout; record store owner; publishing house owner
- Years active: 1918 – late 1950s
- Labels: RCA Victor; Bluebird Records; Columbia Records; Okeh Records

Lester Franklin Melrose (December 14, 1891 – April 12, 1968) was a talent scout who was one of the first American producers of Chicago blues records.

== Career ==
Lester Franklin Melrose was born in Sumner, Illinois, the second of six children of Frank and Mollie Melrose, who owned a small farm. He relocated to Chicago around 1914 and tried out unsuccessfully as a catcher for the Chicago White Sox baseball team before starting work as a grocery salesman.

In 1918 (though some sources state 1922), he joined forces with his elder brother Walter and Marty Bloom (born Martin Blumenthal, 1893-1974) to form the Melrose Brothers Music Company, a publishing house and music store on the South Side of Chicago. In May 1923, he met Jelly Roll Morton at the store, and Morton became the company's chief songwriter and arranger. By the end of 1923, Walter Melrose moved the music publishing business downtown, while Lester continued for a while to operate the music store with a new partner.

In 1925, Lester Melrose sold his share of the store and became a freelance A&R man, combining the roles of talent scout and record producer. He started to promote many blues artists who became popular, recording them mainly in Chicago.

He worked for several record labels simultaneously in the 1930s, including RCA Victor and its subsidiary Bluebird. He also worked for Columbia and its Okeh subsidiary. Among the artists he recorded and brought to the world's attention were Joe "King" Oliver, Big Bill Broonzy, Sonny Boy Williamson, Memphis Minnie, Roosevelt Sykes, Memphis Slim, Lonnie Johnson, Big Joe Williams, Bukka White, Washboard Sam, Champion Jack Dupree, Jazz Gillum, Arthur Crudup, Victoria Spivey and Leroy Carr.

In many ways Melrose can be considered a founder of the Chicago blues, although he favored acoustic over electric performances. Most of his recordings were made with a small group of session musicians and had a similar sound overall. Muddy Waters, who was rejected when he auditioned for Melrose, called it "sweet jazz". The music was a mixture of black blues and vaudeville styles and material with newer swing rhythms. Melrose's chief contribution was to establish a sound with full band arrangements, ensemble playing and a rhythm section, which appealed to the increasingly urbanised black record-buying audience and prefigured the electric blues and R&B of the late 1940s and the small group sound that became dominant in rock and roll.

The Melrose sound dominated Chicago blues before World War II, but the arrival of large numbers of Southern African Americans in Chicago during and after the war brought Melrose's dominance to an end as a harder, deeper blues sound proved more popular with the new audience. However, Melrose continued to work into the 1950s. He then retired to Lake, Florida, and died there in April 1968.

Although he could not play or sing a note of music, he owned the copyright to over three thousand songs, mostly blues. As was the widespread custom at the time (and not just in blues music), Melrose often assigned composer credit and performance rights of the artists' songs to himself, paying the artists only for the recording session. His name appeared on "Reefer Head Woman", recorded by Jazz Gillum, and featuring 16-year-old electric guitarist George Barnes (the song was later recorded by Aerosmith), and "Me and My Chauffeur", recorded by Memphis Minnie (and later by Jefferson Airplane). His name also appeared on three Arthur Crudup songs recorded by Elvis Presley.

Melrose is a member of the Blues Hall of Fame.

== Family members ==
His older brother Walter Melrose (1889–1973) was a music publisher who received songwriter credit for several songs identified with the Original Dixieland Jass Band, including the standards "High Society" and "Tin Roof Blues", both of which were hits as late as the 1950s.

A third brother, Franklyn Melrose (1907–1941), was a jazz pianist who also used stage names of Kansas City Frank and Broadway Rastus. He died after a fight in a club.
