= Sumner, Illinois =

Sumner
- City
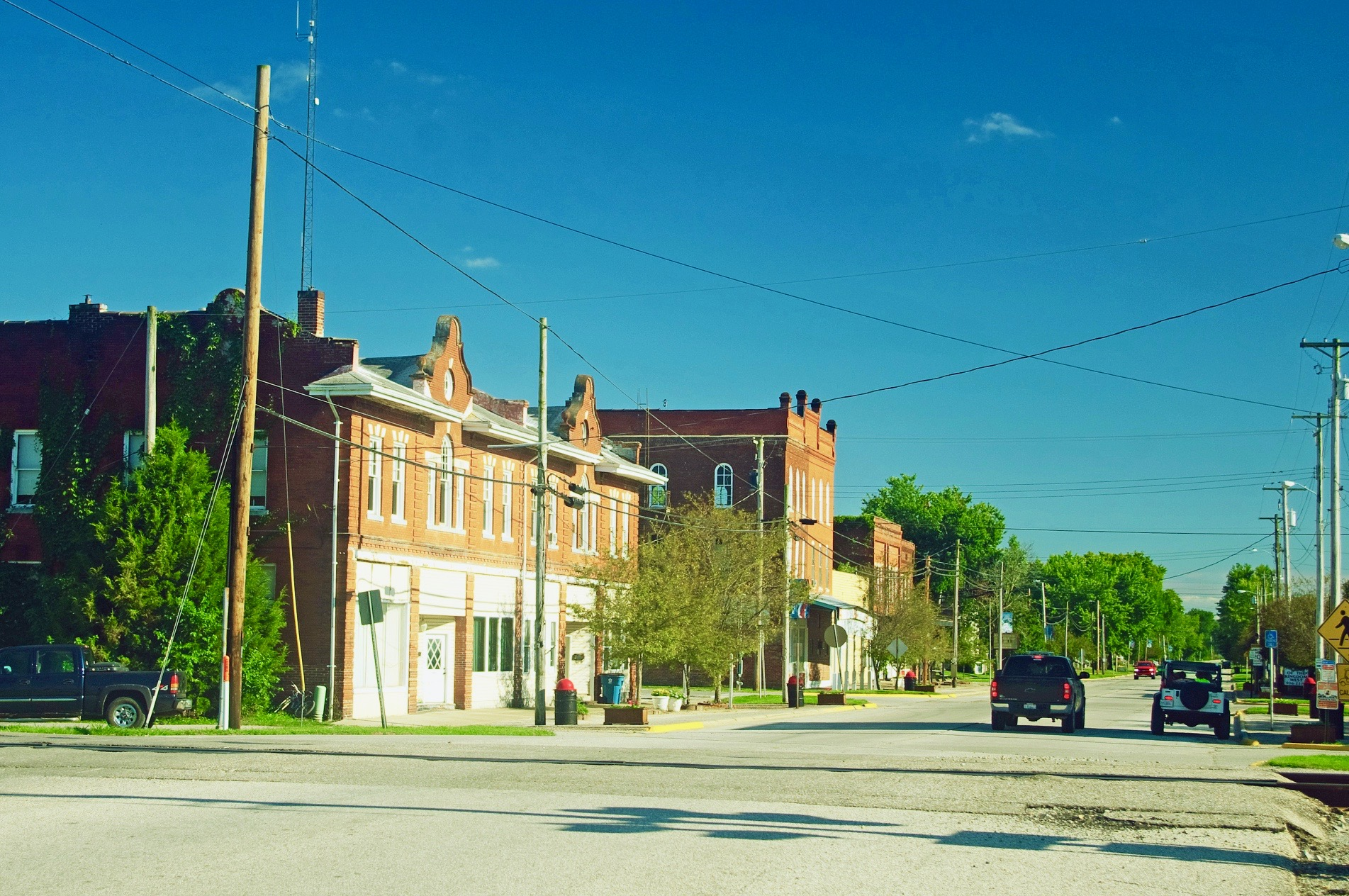
- Christy Ave

- Location of Sumner in Lawrence County, Illinois.
- Coordinates: 38°43′17″N 87°53′05″W
- Country: United States
- State: Illinois
- County: Lawrence
- Founded: 1855
- incorporated: 1887

Area
  - Total: 1.40 sq mi (3.62 km^{2})
  - Land: 1.40 sq mi (3.62 km^{2})
  - Water: 0 sq mi (0.00 km^{2})
- Elevation: 453 ft (138 m)

Population (2020)
  - Total: 2,631
  - Density: 1,881.9/sq mi (726.62/km^{2})
- Time zone: UTC-6 (CST)
  - Summer (DST): UTC-5 (CDT)
- ZIP code: 62466
- Area code: 618
- FIPS code: 17-73703
- GNIS feature ID: 2396003
- Website: http://sumnerillinois.com/

Sumner is a city in Lawrence County, Illinois, United States. As of the 2020 census, Sumner had a population of 2,631. Approximately 2,000 of that population were inmates at the Lawrence Correctional Center.

== History ==
Sumner was established as a stop along the Ohio and Mississippi Railway in the early 1850s. Initially known as "Black Jack" when a post office was opened in 1852, the city was renamed for Benjamin Sumner, an early settler, in 1855. Sumner incorporated in 1887.

== Geography ==
Sumner lies along Illinois State Route 250, just south of its junction with U.S. Route 50 to the north. Red Hills State Park is located just to the northeast.

According to the 2021 census gazetteer files, Sumner has a total area of 1.40 square miles (3.63 km^{2}), all land.

== Demographics ==
Historical population
Census	Pop.	Note	%±
1870	672		—
1880	1,021		51.9%
1890	1,037		1.6%
1900	1,268		22.3%
1910	1,413		11.4%
1920	1,029		−27.2%
1930	967		−6.0%
1940	1,070		10.7%
1950	1,170		9.3%
1960	1,035		−11.5%
1970	1,201		16.0%
1980	1,238		3.1%
1990	1,083		−12.5%
2000	1,022		−5.6%
2010	3,174		210.6%
2020	2,631		−17.1%
U.S. Decennial Census

=== Racial and ethnic composition ===
Sumner city, Illinois – Racial and ethnic composition Note: the US Census treats Hispanic/Latino as an ethnic category. This table excludes Latinos from the racial categories and assigns them to a separate category. Hispanics/Latinos may be of any race.
Race / Ethnicity (NH = Non-Hispanic)	Pop 2000	Pop 2010	Pop 2020	% 2000	% 2010	% 2020
White alone (NH)	992	1,283	1,016	97.06%	40.42%	38.62%
Black or African American alone (NH)	20	1,468	1,267	1.96%	46.25%	48.16%
Native American or Alaska Native alone (NH)	0	3	0	0.00%	0.09%	0.00%
Asian alone (NH)	0	9	11	0.00%	0.28%	0.42%
Native Hawaiian or Pacific Islander alone (NH)	0	1	0	0.00%	0.03%	0.00%
Other race alone (NH)	0	1	5	0.00%	0.03%	0.19%
Mixed race or Multiracial (NH)	3	6	23	0.29%	0.19%	0.87%
Hispanic or Latino (any race)	7	403	309	0.68%	12.70%	11.74%
Total	1,022	3,174	2,631	100.00%	100.00%	100.00%

=== 2020 census ===
As of the 2020 census, Sumner had a population of 2,631. There were 280 households and 218 families residing in the city. The population density was 1,881.97 inhabitants per square mile (726.63/km^{2}). There were 331 housing units at an average density of 236.77 per square mile (91.42/km^{2}).

The median age was 36.4 years. 6.2% of residents were under the age of 18 and 7.3% of residents were 65 years of age or older. For every 100 females there were 643.2 males, and for every 100 females age 18 and over there were 831.3 males age 18 and over.

0.0% of residents lived in urban areas, while 100.0% lived in rural areas.

Of the 280 households, 30.7% had children under the age of 18 living in them. Of all households, 39.3% were married-couple households, 21.1% were households with a male householder and no spouse or partner present, and 28.2% were households with a female householder and no spouse or partner present. About 30.7% of all households were made up of individuals and 14.7% had someone living alone who was 65 years of age or older.

There were 331 housing units, of which 15.4% were vacant. The homeowner vacancy rate was 2.0% and the rental vacancy rate was 14.6%.

Racial composition as of the 2020 census
Race	Number	Percent
White	1,036	39.4%
Black or African American	1,280	48.7%
American Indian and Alaska Native	0	0.0%
Asian	11	0.4%
Native Hawaiian and Other Pacific Islander	0	0.0%
Some other race	278	10.6%
Two or more races	26	1.0%

=== Income and poverty ===
The median income for a household in the city was $36,298, and the median income for a family was $37,174. Males had a median income of $37,438 versus $21,111 for females. The per capita income for the city was $7,303. About 28.9% of families and 26.0% of the population were below the poverty line, including 31.7% of those under age 18 and 18.9% of those age 65 or over.

=== Demographic estimates ===
Sumner is sometimes reported as the American town with the highest male-to-female ratio. Males represent about 90 percent of the population when the figures include the Lawrence Correctional Center.

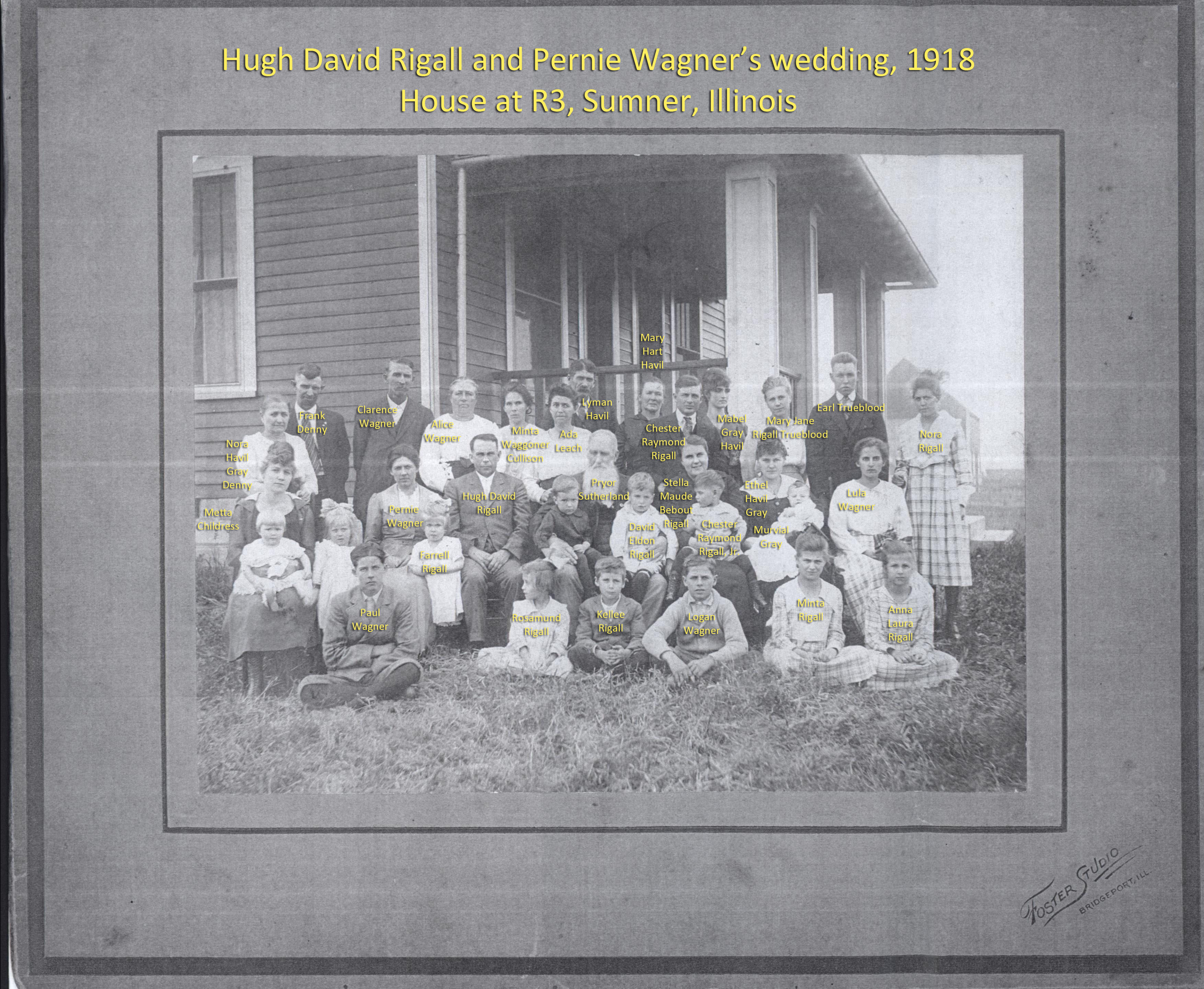
Hugh David Rigall and Pernie Wagner's wedding, Sumner, Illinois, 1918

== In the arts ==
In 2011–2013, the "found footage" horror film Unlisted Owner was filmed in and around Sumner by Jed Brian's production company Lawford County Productions. The film received a distribution agreement from Tom Cat Films in October 2016.

== Notable people ==
- Lee Martin, author of several books, most notably The Bright Forever.
- Lester and Walter Melrose, music producers, born in Sumner
