= Walter Melrose =

American music publisher (1889–1973)

- Born: Walter Melrose; October 26, 1889; Sumner, Illinois, United States
- Died: May 30, 1973 (aged 83); Lake Barrington, Illinois, United States
- Occupations: Music publisher and lyricist
- Relatives: Lester Melrose (brother)

Walter Melrose (October 26, 1889 – May 30, 1973) was an American music publisher and lyricist in the 1920s and 1930s.

== Background ==
He was born in Sumner, Illinois, and was the brother of Lester Melrose, with whom he established a music store in Chicago. This became successful after the Tivoli Theatre opened in the same street, greatly increasing the amount of passing trade. Melrose branched into music publishing when Jelly Roll Morton turned up in his store, and hits such as Wolverine Blues and King Porter Stomp became highly successful for the company. In 1926 he arranged a series of recordings for Victor Records by Morton's Red Hot Peppers, which have come to be regarded as landmarks of early jazz. He later parted company with Morton acrimoniously, and stopped paying him royalties for his compositions.

== Major publications ==
He and his brother published the jazz standard "Tin Roof Blues" composed by the New Orleans Rhythm Kings in 1923. He also wrote the lyrics to that song.

Melrose added lyrics to many existing jazz compositions that his company published, such as "Copenhagen". He established one of the major publishing companies with his brother, known as Melrose Brothers Music: The House That Blues Built.

== Other publications ==
Melrose Music also published Glenn Miller's 125 Jazz Breaks for Trombone, Louis Armstrong's 125 Jazz Breaks for Cornet, and Benny Goodman's 24 Hot Breaks for Clarinet in 1928.
