= Nat King Cole discography =

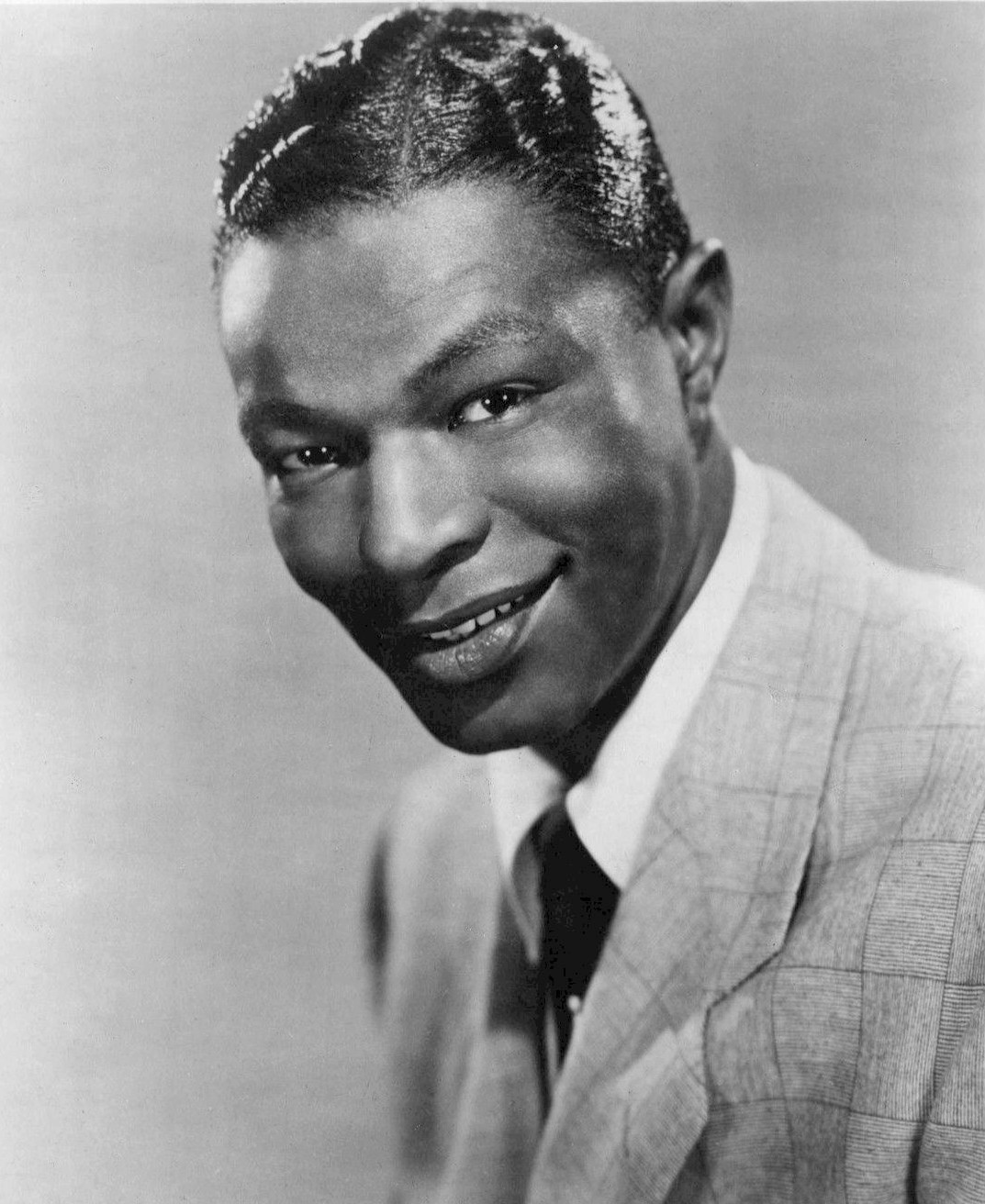
- Cole in 1958
- Studio albums: 28 (12")
- Live albums: 1

American singer and jazz pianist Nat King Cole released 28 studio albums and 1 live album. His career spanned almost three decades where he found success and recorded over 100 songs that became hits on the pop charts. Cole started his career as a jazz pianist in the late 1930s, when he formed the King Cole Trio, which became the top-selling group (and the only black act) on Capitol Records in the 1940s. Cole's trio was the model for small jazz ensembles that followed. Starting in 1950, he transitioned to become a solo singer billed as Nat King Cole.

Some of Cole's most notable singles include "Unforgettable", "Smile", "L-O-V-E", "Nature Boy", "When I Fall in Love", "Let There Be Love", "Mona Lisa", "Autumn Leaves", "Stardust", "Straighten Up and Fly Right", "The Very Thought of You", "For Sentimental Reasons", "Embraceable You" and "Almost Like Being in Love". His 1960 Christmas album The Magic of Christmas (also known as The Christmas Song), is the best-selling Christmas album released in the 1960s; and was ranked as one of the 40 essential Christmas albums (2019) by Rolling Stone. In 2022, Cole's recording of "The Christmas Song", broke the record for the longest journey to the top ten on the Billboard Hot 100, when it peaked at number nine, 62 years after it debuted on the chart; and was selected by the Library of Congress for preservation in the United States National Recording Registry.

== Capitol 78-rpm albums ==
Volumes 1–4 released as separate booklets in 10" format. Booklet Volumes 1 and 2 contain 4 shellac records. Booklet Volumes 3 and 4 contain 3 shellac records. Volume 4 is also issued in a box set of three 45-rpm records.

- 1945 – The King Cole Trio
- 1946 – The King Cole Trio, Volume 2
- 1947 – The King Cole Trio, Volume 3
- 1949 – The King Cole Trio, Volume 4

== Capitol 10" albums ==
- 1950 – Nat King Cole at the Piano
- 1950 – Harvest of Hits
- 1951 – King Cole for Kids
- 1952 – Penthouse Serenade
- 1952 – Top Pops
- 1953 – Nat King Cole Sings for Two in Love
- 1954 – Unforgettable (RIAA: Platinum)

== Capitol 12" albums ==
- 1955 – Penthouse Serenade
- 1955 – Nat King Cole Sings for Two In Love
- 1955 – The Piano Style of Nat King Cole
- 1957 – Love Is the Thing (RIAA: Platinum)
- 1957 – After Midnight
- 1957 – Just One of Those Things
- 1958 – Cole Español
- 1958 – St. Louis Blues
- 1958 – The Very Thought of You
- 1958 – To Whom It May Concern
- 1959 – Welcome to the Club
- 1959 – A Mis Amigos
- 1960 – Tell Me All About Yourself
- 1960 – Every Time I Feel the Spirit
- 1960 – Wild Is Love
- 1960 – The Magic of Christmas (reissued in 1963 as The Christmas Song, substituting his 1961 recording of "The Christmas Song" for "God Rest Ye Merry Gentlemen") (RIAA: 6× Platinum)
- 1961 – The Nat King Cole Story
- 1961 – The Touch of Your Lips
- 1962 – Nat King Cole Sings/George Shearing Plays
- 1962 – Ramblin' Rose (RIAA: Platinum)
- 1962 – Dear Lonely Hearts
- 1962 – More Cole Español
- 1963 – Those Lazy-Hazy-Crazy Days of Summer
- 1963 – Where Did Everyone Go?
- 1964 – Let's Face the Music! (Recorded 1961)
- 1964 – I Don't Want to Be Hurt Anymore
- 1964 – Nat King Cole Sings My Fair Lady (Recorded 1963)
- 1965 – L-O-V-E
- 1966 – Nat King Cole at the Sands (recorded live, reached No. 74 in the US)

== Original compilation albums ==
- 1955 – 10th Anniversary Album
- 1956 – Ballads of the Day
- 1957 – This Is Nat King Cole
- 1965 – Sings Songs from Cat Ballou & Other Motion Pictures (No. 77 US)
- 1965 – Sings Hymns & Spirituals

== Other compilation albums ==
- 1965 – Unforgettable (No. 30 US)
- 1965 – Looking Back (No. 360 US)
- 1965 – Nat King Cole Trio: The Vintage Years
- 1965 – Nature Boy
- 1966 – Longines Symphonette Society Presents the Unforgettable Nat King Cole (box set)
- 1966 – The Unforgettable Nat King Cole Sings the Great Songs (No. 145 US)
- 1966 – Sincerely
- 1967 – Stay as Sweet as You Are
- 1967 – The Beautiful Ballads
- 1967 – Thank You, Pretty Baby
- 1968 – Best of Nat King Cole (No. 187 US) (RIAA: Platinum)
- 1969 – Close-Up (No. 197 US)
- 1970 – The Magic of Christmas with Children (Safeway Supermarket promo LP)
- 1972 – The Greatest of Nat King Cole (2-album set sold by Dynamic House)
- 1973 – Nature Boy
- 1974 – Love Is Here to Stay
- 1974 – Love is a Many Splendored Thing
- 1977 – 20 Golden Greats (BPI: Platinum, AUS: Platinum)
- 1979 – Reader's Digest Presents: The Great Nat King Cole (box set)
- 1982 – Greatest Love Songs (BPI: Platinum)
- 1983 – Unforgettable (Australia)
- 1990 – Hit That Jive, Jack
- 1990 – Jumpin' at Capitol
- 1990 – Capitol Collectors' Series (RIAA: Gold)
- 1990 – Cole, Christmas, & Kids
- 1990 – 12 Historical Recordings (Conquistador; CONQ 009)
- 1990 – 12 More Historical Recordings (Conquistador; CONQ 016)
- 1991 – The Complete Capitol Recordings of the Nat King Cole Trio (box set, Mosaic Records)
- 1991 – The Unforgettable Nat King Cole (RIAA: Gold, BPI: Silver)
- 1992 – Nat King Cole at the Movies
- 1992 – Christmas Favorites
- 1992 – The Best of the Nat King Cole Trio: The Instrumental Classics
- 1993 – The Billy May Sessions
- 1993 – Mis Mejores Canciones: 19 Super Exitos
- 1994 – Let's Face the Music & Dance
- 1994 – Greatest Hits (RIAA: Platinum)
- 1996 – Sincerely/The Beautiful Ballads
- 1997 – For Sentimental Reasons
- 1997 – Retro
- 1997 – A Touch of Class
- 1997 – Tell Me All About Yourself/The Touch of Your Lips
- 1998 – The Frim Fram Sauce
- 1998 – Dear Lonely Hearts/I Don't Want to Be Hurt Anymore
- 1999 – Where Did Everyone Go?/Looking Back
- 1999 – Live at the Circle Room
- 1999 – The Christmas Song
- 2000 – Coast to Coast Live (1963 concert at Riverside Inn, Fresno, Calif., 1962 WNEW radio show)
- 2000 – Route 66
- 2000 – Christmas for Kids: From One to Ninety-Two
- 2001 – Golden Greats
- 2001 – The King Swings
- 2001 – Try Not to Cry
- 2001 – Night Lights (radio recordings from 1956, most tracks previously unreleased)
- 2002 – Sings the Great Songs/Thank You, Pretty Baby
- 2003 – Stepping Out of a Dream
- 2003 – The Classic Singles (4-CD book)
- 2003 – 20 Golden Greats
- 2003 – The Best Of...
- 2003 – Love Songs (BPI: Silver)
- 2003 – The Nat King Cole Trio (with famous guests)
- 2003 – The One and Only Nat King Cole
- 2004 – Those Lazy, Hazy, Crazy Days of Summer/My Fair Lady
- 2005 – The World of Nat King Cole (bonus DVD added 2006) (BPI: Silver)
- 2006 – The Very Best of Nat King Cole
- 2006 – Stardust: The Complete Capitol Recordings, 1955–1959
- 2006 – L-O-V-E: The Complete Capitol Recordings, 1960–1964
- 2008 – Holiday Collection 2008: NBC Sounds of the Season
- 2009 – Re:Generations
- 2014 – The Extraordinary Nat King Cole
- 2015 – The Platinum Collection: 75 Original Classics
- 2019 - Hittin' the Ramp: the Early Years (1936-1943)
- 2019 – Ultimate Nat King Cole
- 2021 – A Sentimental Christmas with Nat "King" Cole and Friends: Cole Classics Reimagined
- 2022 – From The Capitol Vaults (Vol. 1)
- 2022 – From The Capitol Vaults (Vol. 2)
- 2023 – From The Capitol Vaults (Vol. 3)
- 2023 – From The Capitol Vaults (Vol. 4)
- 2024 – From The Capitol Vaults (Vol. 5)
- 2024 – Live at the Blue Note Chicago

== Chart singles ==
Year	Single	Chart positions			Certifications
Year	Single	US Pop	US R&B	UK	Certifications
1942	"That Ain't Right"	—	1	—	
1943	"All for You"	18	1	—	
1944	"Straighten Up and Fly Right" / "I Can't See for Lookin'"	9; 28	1; 2	—	
1944	"Gee, Baby, Ain't I Good to You?" / "I Realize Now"	15 —	1; 9	—	
1944	"I'm Lost"	—	4	—	
1944	"It's Only a Paper Moon"	—	5	—	
1945	"If You Can't Smile and Say Yes"	—	3	—	
1945	"I'm a Shy Guy"	—	2	—	
1946	"Come to Baby, Do!" / "The Frim Fram Sauce"	— 19	3 —	—	
1946	"(Get Your Kicks on) Route 66"	11	3	—	
1946	"You Call It Madness (But I Call it Love)"	10	—	—	
1946	"(I Love You) For Sentimental Reasons" / "The Best Man"	1; 14	3 —	—	
1946	"The Christmas Song (Merry Christmas to You)"	3	3	—	
1947	"You Don't Learn That in School" / "Meet Me at No Special Place (and I'll Be There at No Particular Time)"	22 —	— 3	—	
1947	"Save the Bones for Henry Jones" / "Harmony"	12; 12	— —	—	
1947	"Those Things Money Can't Buy"	22	9	—	
1947	"The Christmas Song (Merry Christmas to You)" (re-entry)	23	—	—	
1948	"What'll I Do"	22	8	—	
1948	"Nature Boy" / "Lost April"	1; 20	2 —	—	
1948	"A Boy from Texas"	24	—	—	
1948	"Put 'em in a Box, Tie 'em with a Ribbon (and Throw 'em in the Deep Blue Sea)"	30	—	—	
1948	"Don't Blame Me"	21	—	—	
1948	"Little Girl"	25	—	—	
1948	"Lillette"	—	12	—	
1949	"The Christmas Song (Merry Christmas to You)" (re-entry)	24	—	—	
1949	"Kee-Mo Ky-Mo (The Magic Song)"	—	10	—	
1949	"Flo and Joe"	—	7	—	
1949	"My Mother Told Me" / "Exactly Like You"	— —	6; 9	—	
1950	"For You My Love" (with Nellie Lutcher)	—	8	—	
1950	"I Almost Lost My Mind"	26	7	—	
1950	"Mona Lisa"	1	1	—	
1950	"Home"	22	—	—	
1950	"Orange Colored Sky"	5	—	—	
1951	"Frosty the Snowman"	9	—	—	
1951	"Jet"	20	8	—	
1951	"Always You"	28	—	—	
1951	"Too Young"	1	3	—	
1951	"Red Sails in the Sunset"	24	—	—	
1951	"Because of Rain"	17	—	—	
1951	"Unforgettable"	12	—	—	BPI: Silver
1952	"Walkin'"	—	5	—	
1952	"Somewhere Along the Way"	8	—	3	
1952	"Walkin' My Baby Back Home" / "Funny (Not Much)"	8; 26	— —	— —	
1952	"Because You're Mine" / "I'm Never Satisfied"	16; 22	— —	6 —	
1952	"The Ruby and the Pearl" / "Faith Can Move Mountains"	23; 24	— —	— 10	
1953	"The Christmas Song (Merry Christmas to You)" (re-entry)	30	—	—	
1953	"Strange"	20	—	—	
1953	"Pretend" / "Don't Let Your Eyes Go Shopping (For Your Heart)"	2; 23	10 —	2 —	
1953	"Can't I?"	16	7	6	
1953	"Mother Nature and Father Time"	—	—	7	
1953	"I Am in Love"	19	—	—	
1953	"Return to Paradise"	15	—	—	
1953	"A Fool Was I" / "If Love Is Good to Me"	17; 28	— —	— —	
1953	"Lover, Come Back to Me!"	16	—	—	
1954	"Answer Me, My Love" / "Why"	6; 27	— —	— —	
1954	"Tenderly"	—	—	10	
1954	"It Happens to Be Me" / "Alone Too Long"	16; 25	— —	— —	
1954	"Make Her Mine"	19	—	11	
1954	"Smile"	10	—	2	
1954	"Unbelievable" / "Hajji Baba (Persian Lament)"	26; 14	— —	— —	
1954	"The Christmas Song (Merry Christmas to You)" (new version)	29	—	—	
1955	"Darling, Je Vous Aime Beaucoup" (Moods in Song, EP) / "The Sand and the Sea" (Moods in Song, EP)	7; 23	— —	— —	
1955	"A Blossom Fell" (Moods in Song, EP) / "If I May" (Moods in Song, EP)	2; 8	— —	3 —	
1955	"My One Sin"	24	—	17	
1955	"Someone You Love" / "Forgive My Heart"	13; 13	— —	— —	
1956	"Take Me Back to Toyland" / "I'm Gonna Laugh You Right Out of My Life"	47; 57	— —	— —	
1956	"Dreams Can Tell a Lie"	—	—	10	
1956	"Ask Me" / "Nothing Ever Changes My Love for You"	18; 72	— —	— —	
1956	"Too Young to Go Steady" / "Never Let Me Go"	21; 79	— —	8 —	
1956	"That's All There Is to That" / "My Dream Sonata"	16; 59	15 —	— —	
1956	"Love Me as If There Were No Tomorrow"	—	—	11	
1956	"Night Lights" / "To the Ends of the Earth"	11; 25	— —	— —	
1957	"Ballerina" / "You Are My First Love"	18; 65	— —	— —	
1957	"When I Fall in Love"	—	—	2	
1957	"When Rock and Roll Come to Trinidad"	48	—	28	
1957	"Stardust"	79	—	24	
1957	"Send for Me" / "My Personal Possession"	6; 21	1 flip	— 21	
1957	"With You on My Mind"	30	—	—	
1958	"Angel Smile"	33	—	—	
1958	"Looking Back" / "Do I Like It"	5; 67	2 —	— —	
1958	"Come Closer to Me (Acercate Mas)" / "Nothing in the World"	38; 99	— —	— —	
1958	"Non Dimenticar (Don't Forget)"	45	—	—	
1959	"Give Me Your Love" / "Madrid"	82; 85	—	—	
1959	"You Made Me Love You" / "I Must Be Dreaming"	45; 69	— —	22 —	
1959	"Midnight Flyer" / "Sweet Bird of Youth"	51; 96	12 —	23 —	
1960	"Time and the River" / "Whatcha' Gonna Do"	30; 92	27; 15	23 —	
1960	"My Love"	47	12	—	
1960	"That's You"	101	—	10	
1960	"Just as Much as Ever"	—	—	18	
1960	"The Christmas Song (Merry Christmas to You)" (reissue of 1954 version)	80	—	—	
1960	"If I Knew"	86	—	—	
1961	"Illusion"	108	—	—	
1961	"Take a Fool's Advice"	71	—	—	
1961	"The World in My Arms"	—	—	36	
1961	"Let True Love Begin" / "Cappuccina"	73; 115	—	29	
1962	"Brazilian Love Song"	—	—	34	
1962	"Step Right up (And Say You Love Me)"	106	—	—	
1962	"The Right Thing to Say"	110	—	42	
1962	"Let There Be Love"	—	—	11	
1962	"Ramblin' Rose"	2	7	5	
1962	"Dear Lonely Hearts"	13	15	37	
1962	"The Christmas Song (Merry Christmas to You)" (third version)	65	—	—	
1963	"All Over the World" / "Nothing Goes Up (Without Coming Down)"	42; 87	— —	— —	
1963	"Those Lazy-Hazy-Crazy Days of Summer"	6	11	—	
1963	"That Sunday, That Summer" / "Mr. Wishing Well"	12; 92	19 —	—	
1964	"My True Carrie, Love"	49	n/a	—	
1964	"I Don't Want to Be Hurt Anymore" / "People"	22; 100	n/a	—	
1964	"I Don't Want to See Tomorrow" / "L-O-V-E"	34; 81	n/a	—	BPI: Gold
1964	"More and More of Your Amor"	102	—	—	
1966	"Looking Back"	123	—	—	
1966	"Let Me Tell You, Babe"	90	—	—	
1987	"When I Fall in Love" (reissue)	—	—	4	
1991	"Unforgettable" (with Natalie Cole)	14	10	19	
1991	"The Christmas Song (Merry Christmas to You)" (reissue)	—	—	69	
1994	"Let's Face the Music and Dance"	—	—	30	
2007	"The Christmas Song (Merry Christmas to You)" (re-entry)	—	—	51	
2013	"The Christmas Song (Merry Christmas to You)" (re-entry)	45	—	—	
2015	"The Christmas Song (Merry Christmas to You)" (re-entry)	38	—	—	
2016	"The Christmas Song (Merry Christmas to You)" (re-entry)	47	—	77	
2017	"The Christmas Song (Merry Christmas to You)" (re-entry)	37	—	66	
2018	"The Christmas Song (Merry Christmas to You)" (re-entry)	11	—	56	BPI: Silver
2019	"The Christmas Song (Merry Christmas to You)" (re-entry)	16	—	51	
2020	"The Christmas Song (Merry Christmas to You)" (re-entry)	11	—	56	
2020	"Deck the Halls"	43	—	—	BPI: Gold
2021	"The Christmas Song (Merry Christmas to You)" (re-entry)	11	—	54	BPI: Gold
2021	"Deck the Halls" (re-entry)	46	—	—	
2022	"The Christmas Song (Merry Christmas to You)" (re-entry)	9	—	35	BPI: Platinum
2022	"Deck the Halls" (re-entry)	16	—	84	BPI: Silver
2023	"The Christmas Song (Merry Christmas to You)" (re-entry)	11	—	34	
2023	"Deck the Halls" (re-entry)	17	—	67	
2024	"The Christmas Song (Merry Christmas to You)" (re-entry)	10	—	32	
2024	"Deck the Halls" (re-entry)	20	—	50	
2025	"The Christmas Song (Merry Christmas to You)" (re-entry)	6	—	21	
2025	"Deck the Halls" (re-entry)	20	—	71	

== Holiday 100 chart entries ==
Since many radio stations in the US adopt a format change to Christmas music each December, many holiday hits have an annual spike in popularity during the last few weeks of the year and are retired once the season is over. In December 2011, Billboard began a Holiday Songs chart with 50 positions that monitors the last five weeks of each year to "rank the top holiday hits of all eras using the same methodology as the Hot 100, blending streaming, airplay, and sales data", and in 2013 the number of positions on the chart was doubled, resulting in the Holiday 100. A handful of Cole recordings have made appearances on the Holiday 100 and are noted below according to the holiday season in which they charted there.

Title	Holiday season peak chart positions															Album
Title	2011	2012	2013	2014	2015	2016	2017	2018	2019	2020	2021	2022	2023	2024	2025	Album
"Caroling, Caroling"	—	—	—	79	—	—	—	—	—	—	92	98	95	—	99	The Magic of Christmas
"The Christmas Song (Merry Christmas to You)"	3	3	2	4	3	5	3	5	7	6	9	7	10	10	6	The Christmas Song
"Deck the Halls"	—	—	—	—	—	—	—	52	25	22	29	13	15	18	19	The Magic of Christmas
"I Saw Three Ships"	—	—	—	—	—	—	—	—	98	—	—	—	—	—	—	The Magic of Christmas
"Joy to the World"	—	—	—	—	—	—	—	91	74	71	77	80	73	78	75	The Magic of Christmas
"The Little Christmas Tree"	—	—	—	—	57	—	—	—	—	—	—	—	—	—	—	Christmas for Kids: From One to Ninety-Two
"O Come All Ye Faithful"	—	—	—	—	—	—	—	43	44	38	45	48	47	53	56	The Magic of Christmas
"O Holy Night"	—	—	—	—	—	—	—	—	—	—	99	—	—	—	—	The Magic of Christmas

== Sources ==
- "Both Sides Now" discographies at bsnpubs.com
- Friedwald, Will (2006). Liner notes. In Cole, Nat King. Stardust: The Complete Capitol Recordings 1955–1959. Bear Family Records.
- Friedwald, Will (2006). Liner notes. In Cole, Nat King. L-O-V-E: The Complete Capitol Recordings 1960–1964. Bear Family Records.
