= Wild Is Love =

Studio album by Nat King Cole
- Released: 1960
- Recorded: March 1–2, 1960
- Studio: Capitol (Hollywood)
- Genre: Jazz
- Length: 35:50
- Label: Capitol
- Producer: James Ritz

Nat King Cole chronology
Every Time I Feel the Spirit (1959)	Wild Is Love (1960)	The Magic of Christmas (1960)

Professional ratings
Review scores
Source	Rating
Allmusic	3.5/5 stars

Wild Is Love is a 1960 concept album by the American singer and pianist Nat King Cole, arranged by Nelson Riddle. The album chronicles a narrator's attempts to pick up various women before he finds love at the conclusion of the album. The album formed the basis for an unsuccessful musical, I'm With You, that starred Cole and was intended as a potential Broadway vehicle for him. A television special also called Wild Is Love resulted from the album, and was shown in Canada in late 1961. The television special was not shown in the United States until 1964 due to the brief presence of physical contact between the African American Cole and a performer of Canadian European descent, Larry Kert, that was seen as offensive by commercial sponsors.

The album was released at the advent of the sexual revolution, Cole's biographer Daniel Mark Epstein would subsequently write of the album that "The lyrics tell the story of a man's search for romantic love-its excitements and frustrations, joys and sorrows-with a forward, blunt emphasis on carnal lust, and an edge of cynicism that would have been wholly offensive only a few years earlier".

Wild Is Love was one of six albums nominated for the Grammy Award for Album of the Year at the 3rd Annual Grammy Awards in 1961, where it lost to Bob Newhart's The Button-Down Mind of Bob Newhart.

The string background to Cole's narration on the album was written by Ralph Carmichael, and marked the start of Carmichael's association with Cole as his work with Riddle waned. Cole had felt some rivalry with his fellow Capitol Records artist Frank Sinatra whose albums increasingly dominated Riddle's creative output. One of Nat's most successful recordings, it reached #4 on the Billboard Best Selling Stereophonic LP's chart.

== Track listing ==
1. Introduction – 0:44
2. "Wild Is Love" – 2:03
3. "Hundreds and Thousands of Girls" – 2:38
4. "It's a Beautiful Evening" – 3:15
5. "Tell Her in the Morning" – 3:01
6. "Are You Disenchanted?" – 3:26
7. "Pick-Up" – 2:42
8. "Beggar for the Blues" – 3:31
9. "World of No Return" – 2:50
10. "In Love Again" – 2:48
11. "Stay with It" – 2:17
12. "Wouldn't You Know (Her Name Is Mary)" – 2:28
13. "He Who Hesitates" – 3:21
14. "Wild Is Love (Finale)" – 0:46

All songs written by Ray Rasch and Dotty Wayne.

== Personnel ==
- Nat King Cole – lead vocals
- Nelson Riddle – arranger, conductor
- Ralph Carmichael - background string arrangements on Cole's narration

String Section

- Violins: Victor Arno (4, 6, 9–10, 12–13), James Getzoff (4, 6, 9–10, 12–13), Benny Gill (4, 6, 9–10, 12–13), Carl LaMagna (4, 6, 9–10, 12–13), Joe Livoti (4, 6, 9–10, 12–13), Dan Lube (2-3, 5, 7–8, 11, 14), Mischa Russell (2-3, 5, 7–8, 11, 14), Marshall Sosson (2-3, 5, 7–8, 11, 14), Jerry Vinci (4, 6, 9–10, 12–13), Victor Bay, Alex Beller, Jack Gasselin, Nat Ross
- Violas: Cecil Figelski (4, 6, 9–10, 12–13), Paul Robyn, Barbara Simons
- Cellos: Eleanor Slatkin (4, 6, 9–10, 12–13), Ossip Giskin (2-3, 5, 7–8, 11, 14), Victor Gottlieb (4, 6, 9–10, 12–13), Ray Kramer (2-3, 5, 7–8, 11, 14), David Pratt (4, 6, 9–10, 12–13), Joseph Saxon (2-3, 5, 7–8, 11, 14)

Other Orchestra Members

- Harry Klee - reeds (4, 6, 9–10, 12–13), additional saxophone (2-3, 5, 7–8, 11, 14)
- Lou Levy - piano
- Lee Young - drums

On 2–3, 5, 7–8, 11, 14

- Alto Saxophones: Benny Carter
- Tenor Saxophones: Plas Johnson
- Additional Saxophones: Joe Koch, Buck Skalak
- Trumpets: Pete Candoli, Conrad Gozzo, Shorty Sherock, Irving Bush, Cappy Lewis
- Valve trombone: Juan Tizol
- Additional Trombones: Tommy Pederson, Tommy Shepard, Russ Brown
- Tuba: Red Callender
- Percussion: Emil Richards

On 4, 6, 9–10, 12-13

- Reeds: Paul Horn, Ronnie Lang, Champ Webb
- French Horns: John Graas, Willard Culley, Arthur Maebe, Jim McGee
- Harp: Verlye Brilhart
- Percussion: Frank Flynn
