= Wesley Prince =

American jazz musician

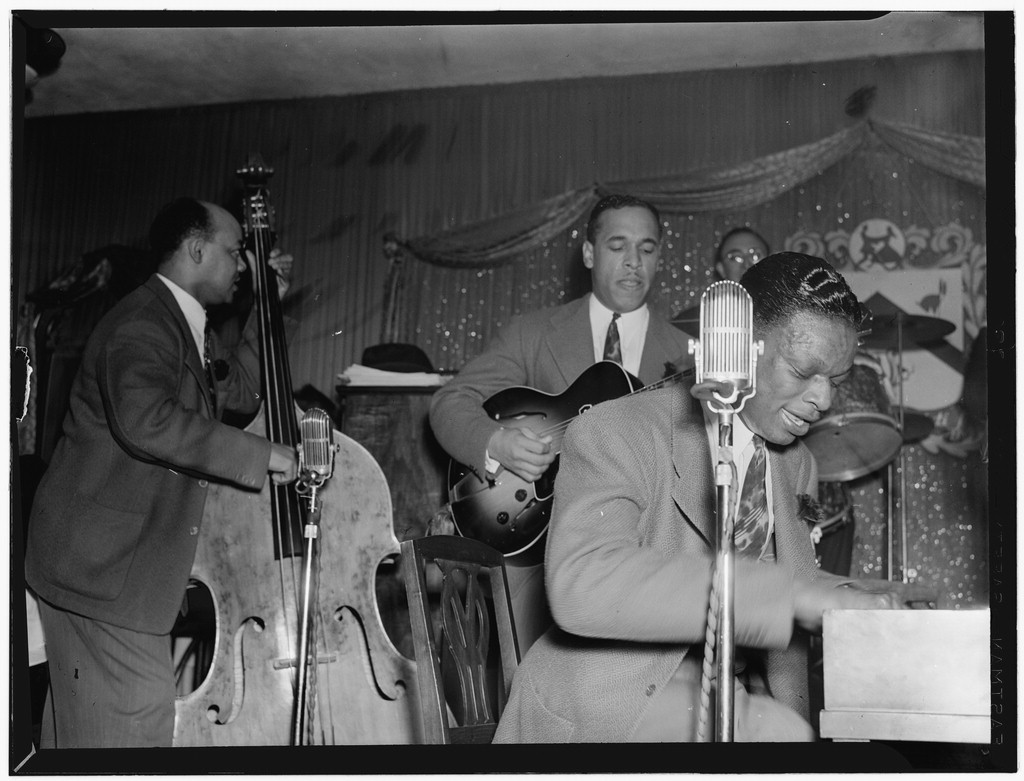
Nat Cole with Oscar Moore and Wesley Prince (right) 1946. Photo: William P. Gottlieb

Clarence Wesley Prince (April 8, 1907 - 30 October 1980) was an American jazz and R&B musician. He played the double bass.

== Life and work ==
Prince was born in Pasadena, California. His father was a preacher; his brother was the jazz musician Henry Prince (who played in Les Hite's band), and he was a cousin of the R&B musician Peppy Prince.

Between 1938 and 1941, he played in a trio with pianist and singer Nat King Cole and guitarist Oscar Moore. In addition, he participated in recordings by Louis Armstrong (1936) and King Perry (1946). Under his own name, he played on several tracks for Excelsior Records. He participated in 29 recording sessions from 1936 to 1946.

For Nat Cole in 1940, he wrote the song "Gone with the Draft" (the title is a play on the popular Hollywood film Gone with the Wind as well as an allusion to the fact that Cole escaped military service because of his flat feet). In August 1942, Prince was drafted for military service In later years, he worked in the aviation industry. Prince never recorded as a session leader.
