= Harvest of Hits =

Greatest hits album by Nat King Cole
- Released: 1950
- Recorded: November 30, 1943, May 1, 1946, March 14, 1946, March 29, 1949, August 15, 1947, November 30, 1943, October 11, 1945, August 22, 1947
- Label: Capitol

Nat King Cole chronology
Nat King Cole at the Piano (1950)	Harvest of Hits (1950)	King Cole for Kids (1951)

Harvest Of Hits is an original jazz compilation by Nat King Cole released by Capitol Records in 1950. Both a 10-inch (33 1/3 rpm) LP version containing 8 tracks, and a 6-track boxed set of three 7-inch (45 rpm) discs was released. The album features Oscar Moore on guitar, Johnny Miller on bass and Lee Young on drums.

== Track listing ==
10-inch LP version
LP side A

1. "Straighten Up and Fly Right" (Cole, Mills)
2. "You Call It Madness (But I Call It Love)" (Conrad, Columbo, DuBois, Gregory)
3. "(Get Your Kicks On) Route 66" (Troup)
4. "Lush Life" (Strayhorn)

LP side B

5. "Kee-mo Ky-mo (The Magic Song)" (Alfred, Hilliard)
6. "Gee Baby, Ain't I Good to You" (Razaf, Redman)
7. "The Frim Fram Sauce" (Ricardel, Evans)
8. "Nature Boy" (ahbez)

Three 7" discs version
Disc 1

1. "Straighten Up and Fly Right"
2. "You Call It Madness (But I Call It Love)"

Disc 2

1. "(Get Your Kicks On) Route 66"
2. "Gee Baby, Ain't I Good To You?"

Disc 3

1. "The Frim Fram Sauce"
2. "Nature Boy"
