= To Whom It May Concern (Nat King Cole album) =

Studio album by Nat King Cole
- Released: May 1959
- Recorded: June 20, August 11, 18, November 11, 12, 1958
- Studio: Capitol (Hollywood)
- Genre: Vocal jazz, pop
- Length: 47:52
- Label: Capitol
- Producer: Lee Gillette

Nat King Cole chronology
The Very Thought of You (1958)	To Whom It May Concern (1959)	Welcome to the Club (1959)

Professional ratings
Review scores
Source	Rating
Allmusic	3/5 stars

To Whom It May Concern is a 1959 album by Nat King Cole, arranged by Nelson Riddle. It reached No. 45 on the Billboard Best-Selling Monophonic LP's chart.

== Track listing ==
1. "To Whom It May Concern" (Nat "King" Cole, Charlotte Hawkins) – 2:58
2. "Love-Wise" (Kenward Elmslie, Marvin Fisher) – 3:56
3. "Too Much" (Bill Baker, Dok Stanford) – 3:20
4. "In the Heart of Jane Doe" (James Cavanaugh, Larry Stock) – 3:02
5. "A Thousand Thoughts of You" (Sammy Gallop, Ulpio Minucci) – 2:58
6. "You're Bringing Out the Dreamer in Me" (Johnny Burke) – 3:09
7. "My Heart's Treasure" (Ray Rasch, Dotty Wayne) – 2:56
8. "If You Said No" (Sammy Cahn, Paul Weston) – 2:56
9. "Can't Help It" (Fisher, Jack Segal) – 3:39
10. "Lovesville" (Ralph Freed, Harry Beasley Smith) – 2:39
11. "Unfair" (Phil Belmonte, Cliff Lee) – 1:54
12. "This Morning It Was Summer" (Bob Haymes) – 3:58

Bonus Tracks included on CD reissue

13. "Give Me Your Love" (Mayme Watts) – 2:10
14. "Coo Coo Roo Coo Coo Paloma" – 3:04
15. "Non Dimenticar" (Michele Galdieri, Shelly Dobbins, P. G. Redi) – 2:50
16. "Bend A Little My Way" (Jack Wolf, Noel Sherman) – 2:23

== Personnel ==
- Jerry Bock Composer
- Nat King Cole – Liner Notes, Primary Artist
- Nelson Riddle – Conductor, Arranger

Tracks 1, 2, 4, 6, 7,

11-August-1958 (Monday) - Hollywood. Capitol Tower

Dick Noel, Tommy Pederson (tbn); Juan Tizol (v-tbn); Russ Brown (b-tbn); Jerome Kasper, Harry Klee, Ronnie Lang (wwd); Israel Baker, Victor Bay, Alex Beller, Dan Lube, Alfred Lustgarten, Lisa Minghetti, Erno Neufeld, Nat Ross, Mischa Russell (vln); Stan Harris, Ralph Lane (via); Edgar Lustgarten, Eleanor Slatkin (vlc); Jimmy Rowles (p/cel); John Collins (g); Joe Comfort (b); Lee Young (d); Nelson Riddle (arr/cond).

Tracks 3, 9, 10,

20-June-1958 (Friday) - Hollywood. Capitol Tower

Pete Candoli, Harry Edison, Mickey Mangano, Shorty Sherock (tpt); Dick Noel, Tommy Pederson (tbn), Juan Tizol (v-tbn); George Roberts (b-tbn); Ronnie Lang, Willie Smith, Buddy Collette, Buck Skalak, Joe Koch (wwd); Joseph DiFiore, Cecil Figelski, Stan Harris, Lou Kievman, Sol Klein, Alex Neiman, Sven Reher, Barbara Simons, Milton Thomas (via); John Williams (p); John Collins (g); Charlie Harris (b); Lee Young (d); Frank Flynn (perc); Nelson Riddle (arr/cond).

Tracks 5, 12,

18-August-1958 (Monday) - Hollywood. Capitol Tower

Huntington Burdick, Richard Perissi (fr-h); John Hacker (wwd); Victor Bay, Alex Beller, Lou Klass, Alfred Lustgarten, Lisa Minghetti, Erno Neufeld, Nat Ross, Paul Shure, Felix Slatkin (vln); Alvin Dinkin, Stan Harris, Ralph Lane, Dave Sterkin (via); Kurt Reher, Eleanor Slatkin (vlc); Jimmie Rowles (p/cel); John Collins (g); Joe Comfort (b); Lee Young (d); Nelson Riddle (arr/cond).

Track 8,

11-November-1958 (Tuesday) - New York. Capitol Studios Studio A

John Collins (g); Charlie Harris (b); Lee Young (d); Nelson Riddle (arr/cond).

Track 11,

12-November-1958 (Wednesday) - New York. Capitol Studios Studio A

John Collins (g); Charlie Harris (b); Lee Young (d); Nelson Riddle (arr/cond).
