= Penthouse Serenade =

Studio album by Nat King Cole
- Released: September 1952
- Recorded: 1951–1952
- Genre: Jazz
- Length: 23:05 (10" LP Release - 1952) 33:38 (12" LP Release - 1955) 50:13 (CD Release - 1998)
- Label: Capitol
- Producer: Lee Gillette

Nat King Cole chronology
King Cole for Kids (1951)	Penthouse Serenade (1952)	Top Pops (1952)

Professional ratings
Review scores
Source	Rating
AllMusic	4.5/5 stars

Penthouse Serenade is an instrumental jazz quartet album by Nat King Cole. It was released initially as a 10-inch LP in September 1952 on Capitol Records. An expanded 12-track version was reissued in 1955 and a 19-track version (13-19 being vocal tracks) was reissued in 1998. The album reached No. 10 on the Billboard Best-Selling Popular Record Albums chart in the issue dated October 17, 1952.

== Track listing ==
Original 1952 10-inch LP album release

1. "Penthouse Serenade (When We're Alone)" (Val Burton, Will Jason) – 3:06
2. "Somebody Loves Me" (Buddy DeSylva, George Gershwin, Ballard MacDonald) – 3:03
3. "Laura" (Johnny Mercer, David Raksin) – 2:43
4. "Once in a Blue Moon" (Anne Caldwell, Jerome Kern based on Rubenstein's Melody In F) – 2:55
5. "Polka Dots and Moonbeams" (Johnny Burke, Jimmy Van Heusen) – 3:03
6. "Down by the Old Mill Stream" (Tell Taylor) – 2:18
7. "If I Should Lose You" (Ralph Rainger, Leo Robin) – 3:11
8. "Rose Room" (Art Hickman, Harry Williams) – 2:46

4 tracks added for the 1955 12-inch LP re-issue

9. "I Surrender Dear" (Harry Barris, Gordon Clifford) – 2:57
10. "It Could Happen to You" (Burke, Van Heusen) – 2:46
11. "Don't Blame Me" (Dorothy Fields, Jimmy McHugh) – 3:02
12. "Little Girl" (Francis Henry, Madeline Hyde) – 1:48

Additional bonus tracks added to later 1998 CD release

13. "I Surrender Dear" (Barris, Clifford) (alt. take) – 3:00
14. "Walkin' My Baby Back Home" (Fred E. Ahlert, Roy Turk) – 2:11
15. "Too Marvelous for Words" (Johnny Mercer, Richard Whiting) – 1:53
16. "Too Young" (Sylvia Dee, Sidney Lippman) – 2:32
17. "That's My Girl" (Ray Ellington, Barbara Tobias) – 1:45
18. "It's Only a Paper Moon" (Harold Arlen, Yip Harburg, Billy Rose) – 2:09
19. "Unforgettable" (Irving Gordon) – 3:05

== Personnel ==
- Nat King Cole – piano, vocals
- John Collins – guitar
- Jack Costanzo – bongos, congas
- Charlie Harris – bass
- Norris "Bunny" Shawker – drums
- Lee Young – drums

Production

- Lee Gillette – producer
- Michael Cuscuna – reissue producer
- Will Friedwald – liner notes
