= The King Cole Trio (album) =

Studio album by Nat King Cole
- Released: 1944–49
- Recorded: Volume 1: December 15, 1943, January 17th 1944, March 6th 1944, Volume 2: 1943–1946, Volume 3: July 2nd, August 6th–8th 1947, November 6th, 24th 1947, Volume 4: 1949
- Studio: C.P. MacGregor (Hollywood); Radio Recorders (Hollywood)
- Genre: Jazz
- Length: 89:57
- Label: Capitol

Nat King Cole chronology
The King Cole Trio (1944)	Nat King Cole at the Piano (1950)

The King Cole Trio, Vol. 2

The King Cole Trio, Volume 3

The King Cole Trio, Vol. 4

Professional ratings
Review scores
Source	Rating
Allmusic	3/5 stars

The King Cole Trio is a series of albums by jazz pianist Nat King Cole's King Cole Trio released by the Capitol Records label. These were Cole's debut commercial recordings.

Originally recorded and released in sets of 78 r.p.m. records between 1944–49, they were reissued in 1950 on 10-inch LPs. The original releases of Volume 3 (as 78 r.p.m. record album) and Volume 4 (as 78 r.p.m record album and as 45 r.p.m. record box set) only contained 6 songs (3 records per set).

The album is the first ever No. 1 on the Billboard album chart first released on March 24, 1945.

== Track listing ==
The King Cole Trio

1. "Sweet Lorraine" (Mitchell Parish, Cliff Burwell) – 3:10
2. "Embraceable You" (George Gershwin, Ira Gershwin) – 3:20
3. "The Man I Love" (G. Gershwin, I. Gershwin) – 3:21
4. "Body and Soul" (Frank Eyton, Johnny Green, Edward Heyman, Robert Sour) – 3:21
5. "Prelude In 'C' Sharp Minor" (Sergey Rachmaninov) – 2:57
6. "What Is This Thing Called Love?" (Cole Porter) – 2:58
7. "It's Only a Paper Moon" (Harold Arlen, Yip Harburg, Billy Rose) – 2:56
8. "Easy Listening Blues" (Nadine Robinson) – 3:11

King Cole Trio, Vol. 2

1. "What Can I Say After I Say I'm Sorry" (Walter Donaldson, Abe Lyman) – 2:58
2. "This Way Out" (Nat "King" Cole) – 2:32
3. "I Don't Know Why (I Just Do)" (Fred E. Ahlert, Roy Turk) – 2:47
4. "I Know That You Know" – 2:23
5. "I'm in the Mood for Love" (Jimmy McHugh, Dorothy Fields) – 2:58
6. "To a Wild Rose" – 3:14
7. "Look What You've Done to Me" – 3:03
8. "I'm Thru with Love" (Gus Kahn, Fud Livingston, Matty Malneck) – 2:54

King Cole Trio, Volume 3

1. "Makin' Whoopee" (Walter Donaldson, Gus Kahn) – 2:32
2. "Too Marvelous for Words" (Richard A. Whiting, Johnny Mercer) – 2:34
3. "This Is My Night to Dream" – (James V. Monaco, Johnny Burke) - 2:23
4. "Rhumba Azul" – 2:34
5. "I'll String Along with You" (Harry Warren, Al Dubin) – 3:13
6. "Honeysuckle Rose" (Fats Waller, Andy Razaf) – 2:39
7. "If I Had You" (Jimmy Campbell, Reginald Connelly, Ted Shapiro) – 3:03
8. "I've Got a Way with Women" (Roy Alfred, Abner Silver, Fred Wise) – 2:46

King Cole Trio, Volume 4

1. "Yes Sir, That's My Baby" (Donaldson, Kahn) – 2:31
2. "For All We Know" (Sam M. Lewis, J. Fred Coots) – 3:04
3. "Bop-Kick" (Cole) – 2:37
4. "Laugh! Cool Clown" (Ruggero Leoncavallo) – 3:21
5. "Little Girl" (Madeline Hyde, Francis Henry) – 2:26
6. "'Tis Autumn" (Henry Nemo) – 3:08
7. "I Used to Love You (But It's All Over Now)" – 3:01
8. "If I Had You" – 3:03

== Personnel ==
Volumes 1, 2, 3

- Nat King Cole – piano, vocals, arranger
- Oscar Moore – guitar
- Johnny Miller – double bass

Volume 4

- Nat King Cole – piano, vocals, arranger
- Irving Ashby – guitar
- Joe Comfort – double bass
- Jack Costanzo – bongos
