= Nat King Cole at the Piano =

1950 studio album by Nat King Cole

Studio album by Nat King Cole
- Released: 1950
- Recorded: August 13, 1947
- Genre: Jazz
- Length: 22:00
- Label: Capitol

Nat King Cole chronology
The King Cole Trio (1944)	Nat King Cole at the Piano (1950)	Harvest of Hits (1950)

Nat King Cole at the Piano is a studio album by jazz pianist Nat King Cole, released by Capitol in 1950.

This album was recorded on August 13, 1947, released in a 78 r.p.m. record in 1949, and reissued in 1950 on a 10-inch LP.

== Track listing ==
1. "Three Little Words" (Bert Kalmar, Harry Ruby) – 2:39
2. "Moonlight In Vermont" (John Blackburn, Karl Suessdorf) – 3:13
3. "Poor Butterfly" (Raymond Hubbell) – 2:34
4. "How High the Moon" (Nancy Hamilton, Morgan Lewis) – 2:41
5. "I'll Never Be The Same" (Matty Malneck, Frank Signorelli) – 2:50
6. "These Foolish Things (Remind Me of You)" (Holt Marvell, Strachey, Harry Link) – 3:14
7. "Cole Capers" (Nat King Cole) – 1:56
8. "Blues In My Shower" (Cole) – 2:53

== Personnel ==
- Nat King Cole – piano, arranger
- Oscar Moore – guitar
- Johnny Miller – double bass
