= Nat King Cole Sings for Two in Love =

Studio album by Nat King Cole
- Released: 1953 (10" LP), 1955 (12" LP)
- Recorded: January 27, 28, 1953 and August 23, 25, 1955
- Studios: Capitol, 5515 Melrose Ave, Hollywood
- Genre: Jazz
- Length: 22:43 (34:24 = 1955 12 inch release)
- Label: Capitol
- Producer: Lee Gillette

Nat King Cole chronology
Harvest Of Hits (1952)	Nat King Cole; Sings for Two in Love (1953)	Unforgettable (1954)

Professional ratings
Review scores
Source	Rating
AllMusic	4.5/5 stars

Nat King Cole Sings for Two in Love is a 1953 album by Nat King Cole, arranged by Nelson Riddle. It was expanded and re-released for the larger 12-inch format in 1955, adding four songs.

The album reached No. 8 on the Billboard Best Selling Popular LP's chart.

The title may be referred to as Sings for Two in Love or just Two in Love.

== Track listing ==
1. "Love Is Here to Stay" (George Gershwin, Ira Gershwin) – 2:49
2. "A Handful of Stars" (Jack Lawrence, Ted Shapiro) – 3:26
3. "This Can't Be Love" (Lorenz Hart, Richard Rodgers) – 2:30
4. "A Little Street Where Old Friends Meet" (Gus Kahn, Harry Woods) – 3:18
5. "Autumn Leaves" (Joseph Kosma, Jacques Prévert, Johnny Mercer) – 2:40
6. "Let's Fall in Love" (Harold Arlen, Ted Koehler) – 2:48
7. "There Goes My Heart" (Benny Davis, Abner Silver) – 2:53
8. "Dinner for One, Please James" (Michael Carr) – 2:57
9. "Almost Like Being in Love" (Alan Jay Lerner, Frederick Loewe) – 1:53
10. "Tenderly" (Walter Lloyd Gross, Lawrence) – 2:57
11. "You Stepped Out of a Dream" (Nacio Herb Brown, Kahn) – 2:35
12. "There Will Never Be Another You" (Mack Gordon, Harry Warren) – 3:38

Original 1953 10 inch LP has eight tracks (tracks 5, 6, 11 & 12 not included).

== Personnel ==
- Nat King Cole – vocal
- Nelson Riddle – arranger, conductor
