= A Mis Amigos =

Studio album by Nat King Cole
- Released: 1959
- Recorded: April 13–16, 1959
- Genre: Vocal jazz
- Length: 28:20
- Label: Capitol
- Producer: Lee Gillette

Nat King Cole chronology
Welcome to the Club (1959)	A Mis Amigos (1959)	Tell Me All About Yourself (1960)

A Mis Amigos is a 1959 studio album by Nat King Cole to the Latin market, arranged by Dave Cavanaugh and recorded in Rio de Janeiro, during his Brazilian tour.

This was Cole's second album of Spanish themed music (despite that it also features three songs in Portuguese, "Suas Mãos", "Caboclo Do Rio" and "Não Tenho Lágrimas"), following Cole Español (1958) and preceding More Cole Español (1962).

== Reception ==
Professional ratings
Review scores
Source	Rating
AllMusic	3.5/5 stars
The Rolling Stone Jazz Record Guide	1/5 stars

The AllMusic review by William Ruhlmann awarded the album three-and-a-half stars, and said that Cole "still didn't have much feeling for Spanish."

This album was a big hit in Brazil during the 60s where it became Cole's most recognized work.

== Track listing ==
1. "Ay, Cosita Linda" (Galan) – 2:16
2. "Aquellos Ojos Verdes" (Menendez) – 2:13
3. "Suas Mãos" (Maria, Pernambuco) – 2:21
4. "Capullito De Aleli" (Hernandez) – 2:28
5. "Caboclo Do Rio" (DeOliveira) – 1:54
6. "Fantastico" (Keller, Sherman) – 1:55
7. "Ninguém Me Ama" (Lobo, Maria) – 2:33
8. "Yo Vendo Unos Ojos Negros" (Osvaldo Silva) – 2:22
9. "Perfidia" (Alberto Domínguez) – 2:20
10. "El choclo" (Villoldo, Discépolo, Marambio Catán) – 2:13
11. "Ansiedad" (Jose Enrique Sarabia) – 3:27
12. "Não Tenho Lágrimas" (Bulhoes, DeOliveira) – 2:18

== Personnel ==
- Nat King Cole – vocals (2–4, 6, 9–12, lead on 1, 5, 7–8)
- Sylvia Telles – additional lead vocals (5, 7)
- Irakitan Trio – background vocals (1, 5, 8)
- Dave Cavanaugh – arranger, conductor
- John Collins – guitar
- Charles P. Harris – bass
- Lee Young – drums
