= Top Pops =

Studio album LP by Nat King Cole
- Released: 1952
- Recorded: 1951–54
- Genre: Jazz
- Length: 45:59
- Label: Capitol

Nat King Cole chronology
Penthouse Serenade (1952)	Top Pops (1952)	Unforgettable (1954)

Alternative cover / title
- 12-inch LP release

Alternative cover / title
- later LP and CD re-issues

Top Pops is an original jazz compilation by Nat King Cole. It was released initially as 8 Top Pops in the 10-inch Capitol Records' LP format in 1952. An expanded (12-track) version was reissued in 1955 in a 12-inch LP format as Top Pops. Four additional "bonus" tracks were added to later CD reissues.

== Track listing ==
=== 10-inch LP (1952) ===
1. "Somewhere Along the Way" (Kurt Adams, Sammy Gallop) - 2:52
2. "Walkin' My Baby Back Home" (Fred E. Ahlert, Roy Turk) - 2:38
3. "Faith Can Move Mountains" (Ben Raleigh, Guy Wood) - 3:12
4. "Because You're Mine" (Sammy Cahn, Nicholas Brodszky) - 3:10
5. "Funny (Not Much)" (Philip Broughton, Bob Merrill, Marcia Neil, Hughie Prince) - 2:57
6. "I'm Never Satisfied" - 2:11
7. "The Ruby And The Pearl" (Jay Livingston, Ray Evans) - 3:12
8. "A Weaver of Dreams" (Jack Elliott, Victor Young) - 2:45

=== 12-inch LP (1955) ===
1. "Somewhere Along the Way" (Kurt Adams, Sammy Gallop) - 2:52
2. "Walkin' My Baby Back Home" (Fred E. Ahlert, Roy Turk) - 2:38
3. "Faith Can Move Mountains" (Ben Raleigh, Guy Wood) - 3:12
4. "Funny (Not Much)" (Philip Broughton, Bob Merrill, Marcia Neil, Hughie Price) - 2:57
5. "Hold My Hand" - 3:03
6. "Teach Me Tonight" (Sammy Cahn, Gene DePaul) - 3:09
7. "I'm Never Satisfied" - 2:11
8. "Because You're Mine" (Sammy Cahn, Nicholas Brodszky) - 3:10
9. "The Ruby And The Pearl" (Jay Livingston, Ray Evans) - 3:12
10. "A Weaver of Dreams" (Jack Elliott, Victor Young) - 2:45
11. "Papa Loves Mambo" (Al Hoffman, Dick Manning, Bickley S. Reichmer) - 2:39
12. "If I Give My Heart To You" (Jimmy Brewster, Jimmy Crane, Al Jacobs) - 2:58

Bonus tracks on later CD re-issue:

13. "You Will Never Grow Old" - 2:49
14. "How (How Do I Go About It?)" - 2:45
15. "When I'm Alone" - 2:49
16. "A Fool Was I" (Roy Alfred) - 2:50
