= King Cole for Kids =

Studio album by Nat King Cole
- Released: 1951
- Recorded: August 15, 22 and 27, 1947
- Genre: Jazz
- Label: Capitol

Nat King Cole chronology
Harvest of Hits (1950)	King Cole for Kids (1951)	Penthouse Serenade (1952)

King Cole for Kids is an album by jazz pianist Nat King Cole, released by the Capitol Records label.

The album was recorded on August 15, 22 and 27, 1947, released as a 78 r.p.m. record in 1947, and reissued in 1951 on a 10-inch LP.

== Track listing ==
=== 78 r.p.m. album (1947) ===
1. "Ke-Mo-Ki-Mo (The Magic Song)"
2. "Old MacDonald Had a Farm"
3. "(Go To Sleep) My Sleepy Head"
4. "Nursery Rhymes"
5. "The Three Trees"
6. "There's a Train Out for Dreamland"

=== 10 inch LP (1951) ===
1. "Ke-Mo-Ki-Mo (The Magic Song)"
2. "Old MacDonald Had a Farm"
3. "(Go To Sleep) My Sleepy Head"
4. "Nursery Rhymes"
5. "The Three Trees"
6. "There's a Train Out for Dreamland"
7. "Three Blind Mice"
8. "I Wanna Be a Friend of Yours"

== Personnel ==
- Nat King Cole – piano, arranger, celesta
- Oscar Moore – guitar
- Johnny Miller – double bass
- Pinto Colvig – sound effects
- Frank DeVol – arranger on tracks 3 and 6 on the 78 r.p.m. album (1947)
