= 10th Anniversary Album (Nat King Cole album) =

Studio album by Nat King Cole
- Released: 1953 (10") 1955 (12")
- Recorded: 1948–1953
- Genre: Jazz
- Length: 43:44
- Label: Capitol

Nat King Cole chronology
Unforgettable (1954)	10th Anniversary Album (1953)	The Piano Style of Nat King Cole (1955)

10th Anniversary Album is an original jazz compilation by Nat King Cole. It was released in 1955. The album reached No. 7 on the US Billboard Best Selling Popular Albums chart, in July, 1954.

== Track listing ==
LP side A:

1. "Dream a Little Dream of Me" (Wilbur Schwandt, Fabian Andre, Gus Kahn) – 2:54
2. "There I've Said It Again" (David Mann, Redd Evans) – 3:11
3. "Lulubelle" (Nat "King" Cole) – 2:15
4. "I'm an Errand Boy for Rhythm" (Cole) – 2:20
5. "The Love Nest" (Otto Harbach, Louis Hirsch) – 2:35
6. "But All I've Got Is Me" (Cole, Don George) – 2:51
7. "Peaches" (Terry Gibbs) – 2:40
8. "I Can't Be Bothered" (Gene Austin) – 2:45

LP side B:

1. "Too Soon" – 2:41
2. "Rough Ridin'" (Ella Fitzgerald, Ollie Jones, William Tennyson) – 2:51
3. "The Story of My Wife" – 2:37
4. "Sleeping Beauty" – 2:36
5. "Lovelight" – 3:15
6. "Where Were You?" – 2:18
7. "Mother Nature and Father Time" (Kay Twomey, Ben Weisman, Fred Wise) – 3:11
8. "Wish I Were Somebody Else" (Jimmy Van Heusen) – 2:44

== Personnel ==
- Nat King Cole – vocals
