= Somewhere Along the Way =

1952 popular music song

Single by Nat King Cole
- A-side: "What Does It Take"
- Published: 1952
- Released: April 1952
- Recorded: January 10, 1952
- Genre: Traditional pop
- Length: 2:49
- Label: Capitol
- Composer: Jimmy Van Heusen
- Lyricist: Sammy Gallop
- Producer: Lee Gillette

"Somewhere Along the Way" is a popular song. The music was written by Jimmy Van Heusen, under the pseudonym Kurt Adams, with lyrics by Sammy Gallop. The sheet music was published in 1952.

The original recording by Nat King Cole was released by Capitol Records as catalog number 2069. It first reached the Billboard Best Seller chart on May 23, 1952 and lasted 22 weeks on the chart, peaking at number 8.

It appeared on the first UK singles chart in November 1952 at number 3, its peak position.

The song became the opening track to Cole's 1952 album 8 Top Pops. He subsequently re-recorded the song in stereo for his album The Nat King Cole Story (1961).

== Other versions ==
- Gene Ammons on a 1952 single (Decca 9-28222).
- Tony Bennett recorded the song for his 1955 album Alone at Last with Tony Bennett.
- Cliff Richard on the album Cliff Sings (1959).
- Frank Sinatra in 1961 with Axel Stordahl arranging and conducting for his final Capitol album, Point Of No Return, released in 1962.
- John Gary on his album Catch a Rising Star (1963).
- Doris Troy on her 1963 album Sings Just One Look & Other Memorable Selections.
- The Platters - The New Soul of the Platters - Campus Style (1964)
- Sam Fletcher on his 1964 album I Believe in You.
- Bobby Vinton on his 1964 album Tell Me Why.
- Jack Jones - My Kind of Town (1965).
- Alex Chilton on his 1993 album Clichés.
- The song was performed by Bette Midler in the 1997 film That Old Feeling, accompanied by a grand piano and double bass.
- Natalie Cole - Still Unforgettable (2008)
- Charles Aznavour covered the song in French as "Quelque part dans la nuit" (1954).
- Bob Dylan - Triplicate (2017)
