= Straighten Up and Fly Right =

1944 single by The King Cole Trio

Single by the King Cole Trio
- Released: April 14, 1944
- Recorded: November 30, 1943
- Studio: C.P. MacGregor, Hollywood
- Label: Capitol 154
- Songwriters: Nat King Cole; Irving Mills
- Producer: Johnny Mercer

The King Cole Trio singles chronology
"All for You" (1943)	"Straighten Up and Fly Right" (1944)	"Gee, Baby, Ain't I Good to You" (1944)

"Straighten Up and Fly Right" is a 1943 song written by Nat King Cole and Irving Mills and one of the first vocal hits for the King Cole Trio. It was the trio's most popular single, reaching number one on the Harlem Hit Parade for ten nonconsecutive weeks. The single also peaked at number nine on the pop charts. "Straighten Up and Fly Right" also reached number one for six nonconsecutive weeks on the Most Played Jukebox Hillbilly Records.

== Background ==
The song was based on a Black folk tale that Cole's father had used as a theme for one of his sermons. In the tale, a buzzard takes different animals for a joy ride. When he gets hungry, he throws them off on a dive and eats them for dinner. A monkey who had observed this trick goes for a ride; he wraps his tail around the buzzard's neck and gives the buzzard a big surprise by nearly choking him to death.

The song's harmonic structure is based on that of the George and Ira Gershwin's song, "I Got Rhythm".

The King Cole Trio recorded the song, along with "Gee, Baby, Ain't I Good to You", "If You Can’t Smile and Say Yes" and "Jumpin' at Capitol", for Capitol Records during a three-hour recording session at C.P. MacGregor Studios in Hollywood on November 30, 1943, with Johnny Mercer producing and John Palladino engineering the session.

Cole sold his share of the publishing rights to the song for $50 before it was a hit. He later sued to try to regain the rights, but was unsuccessful.

== Cover versions ==
- The Andrews Sisters' version of the song reached number 8 on the charts in 1944.
- In 1958, The DeJohn Sisters recorded the song, which peaked at number 73 on the pop chart.
- Bob Wills & His Texas Playboys, KGO radio in San Francisco recorded at the Fairmont Hotel. Tiffany Transcriptions 01 (late 1940s)
- Sammy Davis Jr., The Nat King Cole Songbook (1965)
- Marvin Gaye, A Tribute to the Great Nat King Cole (1965)
- Carmen McRae, Velvet Soul (1972)
- Buddy Tate, Just Jazz (1984)
- Linda Ronstadt, For Sentimental Reasons (1986)
- Natalie Cole, Unforgettable... with Love (1991)
- Norman Foote recorded a cover on his JUNO-nominated album If the Shoe Fits (1992).
- Diana Krall, Stepping Out (1993)
- Sharon, Lois & Bram's version of the song was featured on their 1995 album Let's Dance. The trio also performed the song numerous times on tour.
- Oscar Brown Jr., Sin & Soul ...and then some (track recorded 1960, album released 1996)
- Acoustix, Jazz, Jazz, Jazz (1998)
- Neal McCoy, The Life of the Party (1999)
- Nnenna Freelon (with Take 6), Soulcall (2000)
- Robbie Williams, Swing When You're Winning (2001)
- Lyle Lovett, Smile: Songs from the Movies (2003)
- Suzy Bogguss, Swing (2003)
- Vocal Point, Standing Room Only (2004)
- Dianne Reeves, Good Night, and Good Luck (2005)
- Imre Saarna "Estonian Idol - Eesti Otsib Superstaar Lilleball concerti" (2010)
- King's Singers, Swimming Over London (2010)
- Caravan Palace sampled four lines for the track "Human Leather Shoes for Crocodile Dandies" on their 2015 album <I°_°I>
- Jeff Goldblum and Imelda May on his 2018 debut album The Capitol Studios Sessions

== In popular culture ==
- The song was a part of the score of the 1943 film Here Comes Elmer.
- The song was used in the 1983 film The Right Stuff. John Glenn (played by Ed Harris) correctly guesses the song on the show Name That Tune. Jeff Goldblum, who recorded a version of the song in 2018, plays one of the NASA recruiters (along with Harry Shearer) who immediately guess the correct song while watching Glenn on television.
- The song was used in the 1995 HBO historical war drama The Tuskegee Airmen and the title was quoted by the pilots when going into battle.
- The Andrews Sisters' version is featured in the 2010 video game Mafia II as one of the in-game radio songs and was used in the trailer for the Power Armor Edition of Fallout 76, in addition to being in the in-game radio.
- The song was used in the season 4 episode of Tales from the Crypt, "Split Personality".
- The song was used in NBC's drama series This Is Us, "The best washing machine in the whole world". Rebecca Pearson (played by Mandy Moore) sang the song during rehearsal.
- The song was most recently (2019) used in episode 1 of George Clooney's re-tooling of Catch 22 as a miniseries for Hulu, the U.S.-based subscription video on demand service.
- The Nat King Cole's version of the song was quoted by Maya Angelou in her bestseller I Know Why The Caged Bird Sings
- The Perseverance rover executed a "Straighten Up and Fly Right" maneuver during its descent towards the Mars surface.
- Aardman's 2000 film Chicken Run originally used "Straighten Up and Fly Right" in the flight school scene on the workprint 2.0, but the song was eventually cut from the final product.
