= The Very Thought of You =

1934 song by Ray Noble

- 1934 release by Ray Noble with Al Bowlly on vocals on Victor Records

Single by Ray Noble and His Orchestra, vocal Al Bowlly
- B-side: "I'll Be Good Because of You"
- Published: April 16, 1934 by Campbell, Connelly & Co., Ltd., London, UK
- Released: June 20, 1934
- Recorded: April 21, 1934
- Studio: Abbey Road Studios, Studio 1, London, UK
- Genre: Pop standard, British dance band
- Length: 3:28
- Label: Victor 24657
- Songwriter: Ray Noble

Music video
- Al Bowlly "The Very Thought of You" on YouTube

"The Very Thought of You" is a pop standard that was recorded and published in 1934 with music and lyrics by Ray Noble. The song was first recorded by Ray Noble and His Orchestra with Al Bowlly on vocals for His Master's Voice in England in April 1934. This record was then released in the United States by Victor, and it reached number one for five weeks on the pop music charts.

The song was the subject of litigation in 1962. In 1934, Noble assigned the copyright to British publisher Campbell, Connelly & Company. Before the copyright was renewed, however, Noble assigned the United States copyright to M. Witmark & Sons. A suit was brought by Campbell, Connelly against Noble, stating that the assignment covered all rights, including rights in the US. A British High Court judge ruled in favor of Campbell, Connelly.

== Charting cover versions ==
- In 1946, Luis Russell recorded the song, which went to number three on the Most-Played Juke Box Race Records charts.
- Nat King Cole recorded the song for his 1958 album of the same name.
- A rhythm and blues version by Little Willie John reached number 61 on the US Billboard Hot 100 in 1961.
- Three years later Rick Nelson's rock and roll version reached No. 26 on the Billboard chart, lasting 7 weeks in the Hot 100, and crossing to No. 11 on the Billboard magazine Easy Listening chart.
- Natalie Cole reached No. 34 on the U.S. Adult Contemporary chart in the spring of 1992 with her version from her LP Unforgettable... with Love (1991). In Canada, her version spent two weeks at No. 19 Adult Contemporary.
