= All for You (1943 song) =

Single by The King Cole Trio
- Released: 1943
- Recorded: 11 October 1942
- Studio: C.P. MacGregor (Hollywood)
- Genre: Jazz
- Label: Excelsior
- Songwriter(s): Robert Scherman

"All for You" is a 1943 single by The King Cole Trio, written by Robert Scherman.

The single, originally released on the Excelsior label was the trio's second number one (after "That Ain't Right") on the Harlem Hit Parade and became their first single to crossover to the U.S. pop chart, peaking at number nineteen.

== Covers ==
Ray Charles recorded a cover of "All for You" on his 1967 album, Ray Charles Invites You to Listen.
