= The Very Thought of You (Nat King Cole album) =

Studio album by Nat King Cole
- Released: November 1958
- Recorded: May 2, 6, 8, 1958
- Studio: Capitol (New York)
- Genre: Traditional pop
- Length: 49:37
- Label: Capitol
- Producer: Lee Gillette

Nat King Cole chronology
St. Louis Blues (1958)	The Very Thought of You (1958)	To Whom It May Concern (1958)

Professional ratings
Review scores
Source	Rating
AllMusic	4/5 stars
The Encyclopedia of Popular Music	4/5 stars
The Rolling Stone Album Guide	4/5 stars

The Very Thought of You is a 1958 album by Nat King Cole, arranged by Gordon Jenkins. The album peaked at #17 on Billboard Magazine's Top LP chart.

== Track listing ==
LP side A:

No.	Title	Writer(s)	Length
1.	"The Very Thought of You"	Ray Noble	3:52
2.	"But Beautiful"	Johnny Burke; Jimmy Van Heusen	3:30
3.	"Impossible"	Steve Allen	3:12
4.	"I Wish I Knew (Notorious)"	C.A. Rossi; Al Stillman	3:16
5.	"I Found a Million Dollar Baby (in a Five and Ten Cent Store)"	Mort Dixon; Billy Rose; Harry Warren	2:53
6.	"Magnificent Obsession"	Fred Karger; Frankie Laine	3:56
7.	"My Heart Tells Me (Should I Believe My Heart?)"	Mack Gordon; Warren	4:16

LP side B:

No.	Title	Writer(s)	Length
8.	"Paradise"	Nacio Herb Brown; Gordon Clifford	3:17
9.	"This Is All I Ask"	Gordon Jenkins	4:34
10.	"Cherie, I Love You"	Lillian Rosedale Goodman	3:34
11.	"Making Believe You're Here"	Sammy Cahn; Van Heusen	3:42
12.	"Cherchez La Femme"	Bob Marcus; Lorenzo Pack	2:44
13.	"For All We Know"	J. Fred Coots; Sam M. Lewis	3:19
14.	"The More I See You"	Gordon; Warren	3:32
Total length:			49:37

Bonus tracks added to Capitol Record's CD re-issue:

No.	Title	Writer(s)	Length
15.	"Don't Blame Me"	Jimmy McHugh; Dorothy Fields	3:56
16.	"There Is No Greater Love"	Isham Jones; Marty Symes	3:03
Total length:			56:36

Bonus tracks added to the Collectors' Choice Music CD re-issue, recorded in 1962:

No.	Title	Writer(s)	Length
17.	"Farewell to Arms"	Allie Wrubel; Abner Silver	2:51
18.	"Happy New Year"	Gordon Jenkins	3:09
Total length:			62:36

The "bonus" tracks "Don't Blame Me" and "There Is No Greater Love" were part of the original recording session, and were added to Capitol Records' 1987 and 1997 CD re-issues. In 2007 Collectors' Choice Music also re-issued "The Very Thought of You" on CD and included the tracks "Happy New Year" and "Farewell To Arms" from a 1962 recording session.

== Personnel ==
=== Performance ===
- Nat King Cole – vocal
- Gordon Jenkins – arranger, conductor
