= Welcome to the Club (Nat King Cole album) =

Studio album by Nat King Cole
- Released: February 1959
- Recorded: June 30, July 1–2, 1958
- Studio: Capitol (Hollywood)
- Genre: Vocal jazz
- Length: 28:07
- Label: Capitol W1120
- Producer: Lee Gillette

Nat King Cole chronology
To Whom It May Concern (1958)	Welcome to the Club (1959)	A Mis Amigos (1959)

Professional ratings
Review scores
Source	Rating
Allmusic	4/5 stars

Welcome to the Club is a 1959 album by Nat King Cole, arranged by Dave Cavanaugh. Cole is accompanied by an uncredited Count Basie Orchestra, without Count Basie himself.

Welcome to the Club was chosen as one of Billboard magazine's 'Spotlight Winners of the Week' upon its release in February 1959. Billboard commented that "Cole works out on a group of swinging, jazz-oriented offerings with interesting backings by Dave Cavanaugh...Cole himself, as usual, is fine and somewhat reminiscent of his earlier swinging efforts." The review also noted the similarity of the album's arrangements to Count Basie's, and praised Cole's efforts on the blues tracks, "I Want a Little Girl" and "Wee Baby Blues".

== Track listing ==
1. "Welcome to the Club" (Noel Sherman, Dick Wolf) – 2:44
2. "Anytime, Anyday, Anywhere" (Ned Washington, Lee Wiley, Victor Young) – 2:19
3. "The Blues Don't Care" (Vic Abrams) – 2:10
4. "Mood Indigo" (Barney Bigard, Duke Ellington, Irving Mills) – 3:21
5. "Baby Won't You Please Come Home" (Charles Warfield, Clarence Williams) – 2:11
6. "The Late, Late Show" (Roy Alfred, Murray Berlin) – 2:32
7. "Avalon" (Buddy DeSylva, Al Jolson, Billy Rose) – 1:45
8. "She's Funny That Way" (Neil Moret, Richard Whiting) – 3:02
9. "I Want a Little Girl" (Murray Mencher, Billy Moll) – 2:49
10. "Wee Baby Blues" (Pete Johnson, Big Joe Turner) – 3:16
11. "Look Out for Love" (Danny Meehan, Colin Romoff) – 1:58

== Personnel ==
- Nat King Cole – vocal
- Dave Cavanaugh – arranger, conductor
- The Count Basie Orchestra

consisting of:

- Marshall Royal – alto saxophone
- Frank Wess – alto saxophone
- Frank Foster – tenor saxophone
- Billy Mitchell – tenor saxophone
- Charlie Fowlkes – baritone saxophone
- John Anderson – trumpet
- Joe Newman – trumpet
- Wendell Culley – trumpet
- Thad Jones – trumpet
- Snooky Young – trumpet
- Henry Coker – trombone
- Benny Powell – trombone
- Al Grey – trombone
- Gerald Wiggins – piano
- Freddie Green – guitar
- Eddie Jones – bass
- Sonny Payne – drums
