= L-O-V-E (album) =

Studio album by Nat King Cole
- Released: 1965
- Recorded: June 3, December 1–3, 1964
- Studios: Capitol (Hollywood); Coast Recorders (San Francisco)
- Genre: Jazz
- Length: 29:40
- Label: Capitol 2195
- Producer: Lee Gillette

Nat King Cole chronology
Nat King Cole Sings My Fair Lady (1964)	L-O-V-E (1965)

Singles from L-O-V-E
- 1. "L-O-V-E" Released: September 1964

Professional ratings
Review scores
Source	Rating
Allmusic	3.5/5 stars
The Encyclopedia of Popular Music	3/5 stars

L-O-V-E is the final studio album by the American singer Nat King Cole. It was arranged by Ralph Carmichael. L-O-V-E was Cole's last album, and was released shortly before his death in February 1965. The songs "The Girl from Ipanema", "My Kind of Girl" and "More (Theme From Mondo Cane)" were recorded December 1–3, 1964, shortly after Cole's diagnosis with lung cancer, and were the last recordings he made. The album peaked at #4 on the Billboard Top LP's chart in the spring of 1965.

The initial Billboard magazine review from January 30, 1965 commented that it was "One of the finest Nat Cole albums to date! He's in great form as he breathes new life into some fine standard material...The title tune is a Cole classic!".

== Track listing ==
1. "L-O-V-E" (Milt Gabler, Bert Kampfert) – 2:30
2. "The Girl from Ipanema" (Antônio Carlos Jobim, Norman Gimbel, Vinícius de Moraes) – 2:56
3. "Three Little Words" (Harry Ruby, Burt Kalmar) – 2:16
4. "There's Love" (George David Weiss, Joe Sherman) – 3:10
5. "My Kind of Girl" (Leslie Bricusse) – 3:11
6. "Thanks to You" (Bob Marcus) – 3:24
7. "Your Love" - (Incorrectly listed as "You're Love" on the original album sleeve) - (Ralph Carmichael, Wayne Dunstan) – 2:14
8. "More (Theme From Mondo Cane)" (Riz Ortolani, Nino Oliviero, Marcello Ciorciolini, Norman Newell) – 2:09
9. "Coquette" (Johnny Green, Gus Kahn, Carmen Lombardo) – 2:55
10. "How I'd Love to Love You" (Joe Bailey) – 2:19
11. "Swiss Retreat" (Jerry Tobias, Milt Rogers) – 2:14

== Recording sessions data ==
- "L-O-V-E" (in English language) was recorded at Capitol Studios in Hollywood on June 3, 1964 (session number AA-19/11848), from 2:00 PM to 6:00 PM.
- On August 18, 1964 Cole overdubbed in Las Vegas the versions of L-O-V-E in French, Spanish, Italian, German and Japanese languages (session number AA-52).
- "Coquette" and "How I'd Love to Love You" were recorded at Coast Recorders in San Francisco on December 1, 1964 (session number AA-22/12165), from 1:00 PM to 4:30 PM.
- "There's Love", "My Kind Of Girl", "Thanks To You", "Your Love", "More" and "Swiss Retreat" were recorded at Coast Recorders in San Francisco on December 2, 1964 (session number AA-23/12166), from 1:00 PM to 5:00 PM.
- "The Girl From Ipanema", "More" and "Three Little Words" were recorded at Coast Recorders in San Francisco on December 3, 1964 (session number AA-24/12167), from 11:30 AM to 2:30 PM. This was the final recording session of Cole.

== Personnel ==
=== Performance ===
- Nat King Cole – vocal
- Ralph Carmichael – arranger, conductor
- Trumpet: Bobby Bryant (trumpet solos), Don Fagerquist, Uan Rasey, Shorty Sherock, Tony Terran, Renauld Jones, Larry McGuire, Al Porcino, Ray Triscari
- Trombone: Kent Larson, Murray McEachern, George Roberts, Tommy Shepard, Robert Knight, Fred Mergy, Wilbur Sudmeier, Bob Fitzpatrick, Ernie Tack
- Saxophone and other reeds: Buddy Collette, Paul Horn, Jack Nimitz, Bill Perkins, Bud Shank, Wayne Dunstan, Charlie Kennedy, Dan Patiris, Modesto Brieno, Jr.
- Violin: Victor Arno, Emil Briano, Harold Dicterow, Dave Frisina, Alex Murray, Erno Neufeld, Stanley Plummer, Jerome Reisler, Isadore Roman, Albert Steinberg, Joseph Stepansky, Sheryl Coltrane, Jimmy Getzoff, Leo Kailin, Lou Klass, Alexander Koltun, Robert Konrad, Mischa Myers
- Viola: Joe DiFiore, Ray Menhennick, Gary Nuttycombe, Robert Ostrowsky, Stanley Harris, Harry Hyams, Rocco Curcio
- Cello: Margaret Aue, Edgar Lustgarten, Emmet Sergeant, William VandenBerg, Paul Bergstrom, Anne Goodman
- Piano: Paul T. Smith, Ken Hildebrand, Jimmy Rowles
- Guitar: Bob Bain, John Collins, Eddie Duran, Paul Milier, Juvenal Amaral
- Bass guitar: Joe Comfort, George Butterfield
- Drums: Irving Cottler, Leon Petties
