= Ramblin' Rose (album) =

Studio album by Nat King Cole
- Released: 1962
- Studio: Capitol (Hollywood)
- Genres: Country, Folk
- Length: 30:38
- Label: Capitol
- Producer: Lee Gillette

Nat King Cole chronology
Nat King Cole Sings/George Shearing Plays (1962)	Ramblin' Rose (1962)	Dear Lonely Hearts (1962)

Professional ratings
Review scores
Source	Rating
New Record Mirror	5/5 stars
The Encyclopedia of Popular Music	3/5 stars

Ramblin' Rose is a Nat King Cole album released by Capitol Records in 1962 and features the popular title track. The LP peaked at number three on the Billboard albums chart and remained on the chart for over 3 years. It was Cole's second gold album.

== Track listing ==
1. "Ramblin' Rose" (Noel Sherman, Joe Sherman) – 2:46
2. "Wolverton Mountain" (Merle Kilgore, Claude King) – 3:03
3. "Twilight on the Trail" (Sidney D. Mitchell, Louis Alter) – 2:51
4. "I Don't Want it that Way" (Noel Sherman, Joe Sherman) – 1:57
5. "He'll Have to Go" (Joe Allison, Audrey Allison) – 2:25
6. "When You're Smiling" (Larry Shay, Mark Fisher, Joe Goodwin) – 2:42
7. "Goodnight, Irene, Goodnight" (Huddie Ledbetter, John Lomax) – 3:08
8. "Your Cheatin' Heart" (Hank Williams) – 2:25
9. "One Has My Name The Other Has My Heart" (Eddie Dean, Hal Blair, Dearst Dean) – 2:18
10. "Skip to My Lou" (Traditional) – 2:00
11. "The Good Times" (Ron Miller) - 2:44
12. "Sing Another Song (And We'll All Go Home)" (Johnny Burke, Colin Romoff) - 2:19

== Personnel ==
- Nat King Cole – vocal
- Belford Hendricks – arranger, conductor

== Certifications ==
Certifications and sales for Ramblin' Rose
Region	Certification	Certified units/sales
United States (RIAA)	Platinum	1,000,000^{^}
^{^} Shipments figures based on certification alone.
