= Dear Lonely Hearts =

1962 studio album by Nat King Cole

Studio album by Nat King Cole
- Released: December 1962
- Recorded: June 19, November 12, 13, 1962
- Studio: Capitol (New York)
- Genre: Country pop
- Length: 29:08
- Label: Capitol
- Producer: Lee Gillette

Nat King Cole chronology
| Ramblin' Rose (1962) | Dear Lonely Hearts (1962) | More Cole Español (1962) |

Professional ratings
Review scores
| Source | Rating |
|---|---|
| AllMusic | 3/5 stars |
| Gaslight Records | 3/10 stars |
| The Encyclopedia of Popular Music | 3/5 stars |

Dear Lonely Hearts is a 1962 studio album by Nat King Cole, arranged by Belford Hendricks. The LP peaked at number 24 on the Billboard albums chart. The title track reached number two for two weeks on the Easy Listening charts and number 13 on the Hot 100 singles chart.

== Track listing ==
1. "Dear Lonely Hearts" (Bob Halley, E.J. Anton) – 3:08
2. "Miss You" (Charles Tobias, Harry Tobias) – 2:32
3. "Why Should I Cry Over You?" (Chester Conn, Nathan "Ned" Miller) – 2:26
4. "Near You" (Francis Craig, Kermit Goell) – 2:16
5. "Yearning (Just for You)" (Benny Davis, Joe Burke) – 2:30
6. "My First and Only Lover" (Artie Kaplan, Paul Kaufman, Jack Keller) – 2:25
7. "All Over the World" (Al Frisch, C. Tobias) – 2:25
8. "Oh, How I Miss You Tonight" (Davis, Joe Burke, Mark Fisher) – 2:24
9. "Lonesome and Sorry" (Con Conrad, Davis) – 2:23
10. "All by Myself" (Irving Berlin) – 2:15
11. "Who's Next in Line?" (Clyde Otis, Rose Marie McCoy) – 2:21
12. "It's a Lonesome Old Town" (Charles Kisco, C. Tobias) – 2:03

== Personnel ==
- Nat King Cole – vocal
- Belford Hendricks – arranger, conductor
