= Unforgettable (Nat King Cole album) =

Compilation album by Nat King Cole
- Released: 1952 (10" LP), 1954 (12" LP)
- Recorded: 1946–1954
- Genre: Jazz
- Length: 36:31
- Label: Capitol
- Producer: Lee Gillette

Nat King Cole chronology
Nat King Cole Sings for Two In Love (1953)	Unforgettable (1952)	10th Anniversary Album (1955)

1954 release
- 12 inch LP with 4 additional tracks

Later re-issue(s)
- LP and CD re-issue cover

Singles from Unforgettable
- 1. "Unforgettable" Released: October 1951

Professional ratings
Review scores
Source	Rating
AllMusic	4/5 stars

Unforgettable is an original jazz compilation by Nat King Cole. It was initially released on a 10-inch LP in 1952, and it was reissued on a 12-inch LP in 1954.

== Track listing ==
1. "Unforgettable" (Irving Gordon) - 3:13
2. "A Portrait of Jennie" (Gordon Burdge, J. Russell Robinson) - 3:09
3. "What'll I Do?" (Irving Berlin) - 3:05
4. "Lost April" (Eddie DeLange, Emil Newman, Herbert W. Spencer) - 2:58
5. "Answer Me, My Love" (Fred Rauch, Carl Sigman, Gerhard Winkler) - 2:38
6. "Hajji Baba (Persian Lament)" (Dimitri Tiomkin, Ned Washington) - 3:07
7. "Too Young" (Sylvia Dee, Sidney Lippman) - 3:13
8. "Mona Lisa" (Jay Livingston, Ray Evans) - 3:16
9. "(I Love You) For Sentimental Reasons" (William Best, Deek Watson) - 2:54
10. "Red Sails in the Sunset" (Jimmy Kennedy, Hugh Williams) - 3:17
11. "Pretend" (Dan Belloc, Lew Douglass, Frank LaVere, Cliff Parman) - 2:44
12. "Make Her Mine" (Chester Conn, Sammy Gallop) - 2:57

tracks 5, 6, 11 and 12 were not part of the original 10-inch LP release but were added to the 1954 (and later) releases.

== Personnel ==
- Nat King Cole – vocals
- The Nat King Cole Trio – on "I Love You for Sentimental Reasons," "What'll I Do?" and "Lost April"
- The Carlyle Hall Strings – on "Lost April" and "A Portrait of Jennie"
- Les Baxter's Orchestra – on "Mona Lisa" and "Too Young"
- Pete Rugolo's Orchestra – on "Red Sails in the Sunset"
- Nelson Riddle's Orchestra – on "Unforgettable," "Pretend," "Answer Me My Love," "Make Her Mine" and "Hajji Baba"
- Lee Gillette – producer

== Charts ==
Chart performance for Unforgettable
Chart (2026)	Peak position
US Top Jazz Albums (Billboard)	22

== Certifications ==
Region	Certification	Certified units/sales
Australia (ARIA)	Gold	35,000^{^}
United States (RIAA)	Platinum	1,000,000^{^}
^{^} Shipments figures based on certification alone.
