= That Ain't Right =

1942 single by The King Cole Trio

Single by The King Cole Trio
- B-side: "Hit That Jive Jack"
- Released: 1942
- Genre: Traditional pop
- Length: 3:11
- Label: Decca
- Songwriters: Nat King Cole; Irving Mills

"That Ain't Right" was the 1942 debut single by The King Cole Trio. It was written by Nat King Cole and publisher, lyricist, and promotor Irving Mills. "That Ain't Right" hit number one on Billboard magazine's Harlem Hit Parade chart for one week. Although the song was the King Cole Trio's first successful single, it would be their final release for Decca, as the contract with the company expired before "That Ain't Right" became a hit.

== Cover versions ==
- Frankie Laine recorded a version of the song and included it on his album Rockin' in 1957.

== In popular culture ==
The song is featured in the musical film Stormy Weather (1943), sung by Ada Brown and Fats Waller.
