= Lee Young =

American jazz musician

Leonidas Raymond Young (March 7, 1914 – July 31, 2008) was an American jazz drummer and singer. His musical family included his father Willis Young and his older brother, saxophonist Lester Young. In 1944 he played with Norman Granz's first "Jazz at the Philharmonic" concert.

== Early life and education ==
Young was born in 1914 in New Orleans, Louisiana, to Willis Young and Lizetta Teresa Johnson. His father was a musician, as were other relatives. His older brother Lester Young became a noted saxophonist. Lee began playing from an early age and the family had a band for several years.

== Career ==
In 1944 Lee Young was the drummer at Norman Granz's first "Jazz at the Philharmonic" concert, which also featured guitarist Les Paul, trombonist J.J. Johnson, and saxophonist Jean-Baptiste "Illinois" Jacquet.

Young played with such jazz and swing music notables as Mutt Carey, Fats Waller, Les Hite, Benny Goodman, and Lionel Hampton. In the 1950s Young played with Nat King Cole's trio. From the 1960s on, he worked as an artist & repertory man for such record labels as Vee-Jay and Motown. Lee Young never recorded as a session leader. He also collaborated with multiple Belgian jazz artists in the late 1970s, most noticeable: Papa Wemba, Marc Moulin and Luzolo Tulunga.

== Personal life ==
Young was married to Louise Franklin and they had a son together.

== Discography ==
- Nat King Cole, Penthouse Serenade (Capitol, 1955)
- Nat King Cole, After Midnight (Capitol, 1956)
- Nat King Cole, The Piano Style of Nat King Cole (Capitol, 1956)
- Nat King Cole, At the Sands (Capitol, 1966)
- Benny Goodman, Mostly Sextets (Capitol, 1950)
- Lionel Hampton, Lionel Hampton with the Just Jazz All Stars (GNP, 1955)
- Oscar Moore, Jazz 1940 Era (Tampa, 1956)
- Andre Previn, Previn at Sunset (Black Lion, 1972)
- Dinah Washington, Mellow Mama (Delmark, 1992)
