= Raymond Rasch =

- Also known as: Ray Rasch
- Born: March 1, 1917; Toledo, Ohio, United States
- Died: December 23, 1964 (aged 47)
- Occupations: Pianist, arranger
- Instrument: Piano
- Years active: 1950s–1964

Raymond Rasch (March 1, 1917 – December 23, 1964) was a pianist and arranger on the Hollywood scene in the 1950s and 1960s.

Rasch was born in Toledo, Ohio. He won a posthumous Oscar in 1972 for Best Original Music Score for Chaplin's 1952 film Limelight (along with Charlie Chaplin and Larry Russell).
