= Oscar Moore =

American jazz guitarist

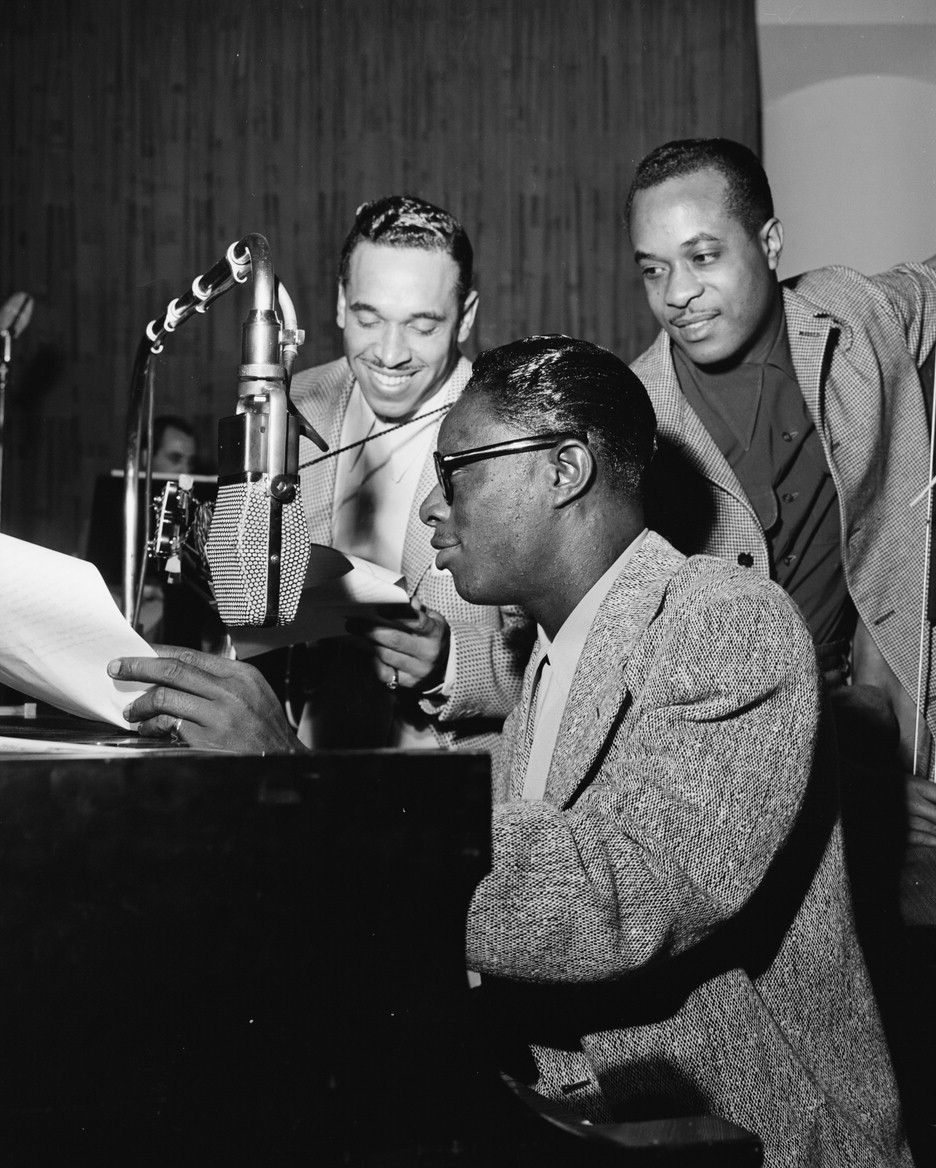
- Oscar Moore (left) with Nat King Cole and Johnny Miller, c. June 1946; Photo: William P. Gottlieb

Background information
- Born: Oscar Frederic Moore; December 25, 1916; Austin, Texas, U.S.
- Died: October 8, 1981 (aged 64) Clark, Nevada, U.S.
- Genre: Jazz
- Occupation: Musician
- Instrument: Guitar

Oscar Frederic Moore (December 25, 1916 – October 8, 1981) was an American jazz guitarist with the Nat King Cole Trio.

== Career ==
The son of a blacksmith, Moore was born in Austin, Texas, United States. The Moore family moved to Phoenix, Arizona, where he began performing with his older brother Johnny, who played both trombone and guitar also had another older brother by the name of Frank Moore,a brother Will Moore as well as Two sisters Annie Moore and Helen Moore.

After moving to Los Angeles, he participated in his first recording session for Decca as part of the Jones Boys Sing Band led and arranged by Leon René. The group attracted local attention on radio and in two short films for MGM directed by Buster Keaton. Soon after, Moore accompanied pianist Nat King Cole at the Swanee Inn in North La Brea, Hollywood. He spent ten years with Cole in the piano-guitar-bass trio format, that influenced Art Tatum, Oscar Peterson, Ahmad Jamal.

Moore placed or topped polls in DownBeat, Metronome, and Esquire magazines from 1943 through 1948. Art Tatum professed his admiration for Moore in a 1944 magazine interview.

After he left the King Cole Trio in October 1947, he joined his brother in Johnny Moore's Three Blazers as a member of that group into the early 1950s. Moore formed his own trio in 1952 and was active in Los Angeles. He recorded sessions as a leader and as a sideman throughout the 1950s, but left the industry at the end of the decade. He returned to the recording studio in 1965 to record a tribute to Cole and again in the 1970s, briefly backing Helen Humes. Moore died of a heart attack in Clark, Nevada, in 1981.

== Discography ==
=== As leader ===
- Oscar Moore Trio (Skylark, 1954) also released as Galivantin' Guitar
- Oscar Moore Quartet (Tampa, 1955) also released as The Fabulous Oscar Moore Guitar
- Swing Guitars with Barney Kessel, Tal Farlow (Norgran, 1955)
- Presenting Oscar Moore with Leroy Vinnegar (Omegatape, 1956)
- Have You Met Inez Jones? (featuring Oscar Moore) (Riverside, 1957)
- In Guitar (Charlie Parker, 1962) reissue of The Fabulous Oscar Moore Guitar
- We'll Remember You, Nat (Surrey, 1966)

=== As sideman ===
- Illinois Jacquet, Collates (Clef/Mercury, 1952) [10" LP]
- Charles Brown, Drifting Blues (Score/Aladdin, 1957)
- The Complete Capitol Recordings of the Nat King Cole Trio (Mosaic, 1991)
- Nat King Cole, Hittin' the Ramp: The Early Years (Resonance, 2019)
- Lester Young & Buddy Rich, The Lester Young Buddy Rich Trio (Verve, 1958) with Nat King Cole
