= Israel Baker =

American jazz musician (1919–2011)

Israel Baker (February 11, 1919 – December 25, 2011) was an American violinist and concertmaster. Through a long and varied career, he played with many of the greatest figures in the worlds of classical music, jazz and pop.

He appeared on hundreds of recordings by artists as diverse as Igor Stravinsky, Ella Fitzgerald, and Tom Waits, and appeared on many film scores including Psycho and Jonathan Livingstone Seagull. Baker was the concertmaster on The Dameans' Beginning Today album from 1973.

== Biography ==
Born in Chicago, he was the youngest of four children of Russian immigrants. He showed great talent as a violinist from an early age, appearing on national radio at the age of six. By the age of 22 Baker was concertmaster of Leopold Stokowski’s All-American Youth Orchestra. Later, he was a member of Arturo Toscanini’s NBC Symphony Orchestra. During World War II, he served as a violinist with the Army Air Forces in Atlantic City, NJ, playing requests to entertain wounded comrades.

After the war, Baker increasingly gravitated towards the West Coast and session work, including work with the famed "Wrecking Crew", although he continued to be a presence in concert halls across the United States. He formed a duo with pianist Yaltah Menuhin; they made their New York debut in 1951. In 1961, he played alongside violinist Jascha Heifetz and cellist Gregor Piatigorsky in a series of chamber concerts, and in 1964, he recorded Arnold Schoenberg's "Fantasy for Violin & Piano" with Glenn Gould. He recorded many of Stravinsky's scores for CBS with Stravinsky himself conducting. He then went on to lead the Los Angeles Chamber Orchestra. Away from the concert hall, he led the West Coast version of the CBS Symphony.

He died at his home in Studio City, California on December 25, 2011, following a stroke.

== Personal life ==
Baker was married twice: to Caroline, who died in 1974, and then to Imelda Corrigan from Dublin Ireland. They were married for over 30 years until his death. He had three children from his first marriage.

He is the grandfather to Vulfpeck bass player, Joe Dart.

== Discography ==
With The 5th Dimension

- Living Together, Growing Together (Bell, 1973)

With Air Supply

- The Christmas Album (Arista, 1987)

With Chet Atkins

- Chet Atkins in Hollywood (RCA, 1959)

With Tony Bennett

- Long Ago and Far Away (Columbia, 1958)

With The Beach Boys

- Summer Days (And Summer Nights!!) (Capitol, 1965)

With June Christy

- This Time of Year (Capitol, 1961)

With Rosemary Clooney

- Love (Reprise, 1961)

With Nat King Cole

- Love Is the Thing (Capitol, 1957)
- To Whom It May Concern (Capitol, 1959)
- Wild Is Love (Capitol, 1960)
- The Magic Of Christmas (Capitol, 1960)
- The Touch of Your Lips (Capitol, 1961)
- Nat King Cole Sings/George Shearing Plays (Capitol, 1962)
- Where Did Everyone Go? (Capitol, 1963)
- Those Lazy-Hazy-Crazy Days of Summer (Capitol, 1963)
- I Don't Want to Be Hurt Anymore (Capitol, 1964)
- Let's Face the Music! (Capitol, 1964)

With Natalie Cole

- Unforgettable... with Love (Elektra, 1991)

With Sam Cooke

- Mr. Soul (RCA, 1963)
- Ain't That Good News (RCA, 1964)

With Bobby Darin

- Love Swings (Atco, 1961)
- Bobby Darin Sings The Shadow of Your Smile (Atlantic, 1966)

With Neil Diamond

- Tap Root Manuscript (Uni, 1970)
- Jonathan Livingston Seagull (Columbia, 1973)
- Serenade (Columbia, 1974)

With Lamont Dozier

- Out Here on My Own (ABC Records, 1973)

With Don Ellis

- Haiku (MPS, 1973)

With The Emotions

- Rejoice (Columbia, 1977)

With Ella Fitzgerald

- Ella Fitzgerald Sings the George and Ira Gershwin Song Book (Verve, 1959)
- Ella Fitzgerald Sings the Jerome Kern Song Book (Verve, 1963)

With Judy Garland

- The Letter (Capitol, 1959)

With Quincy Jones

- Sounds...and Stuff Like That!! (A&M, 1978)

With Stan Kenton

- Lush Interlude (Capitol, 1958)
- The Kenton Touch (Capitol, 1959)

With Peggy Lee

- Make It with You (Capitol, 1970)

With Dean Martin

- A Winter Romance (Capitol, 1959)
- Dino: Italian Love Songs (Capitol, 1962)

With Johnny Mathis and Deniece Williams

- That's What Friends Are For (A&M, 1978)

With Michael Nesmith

- The Wichita Train Whistle Sings (Dot, 1968)

With Harry Nilsson

- Harry (RCA, 1969)
- ...That's the Way It Is (RCA, 1976)

With Van Dyke Parks

- Discover America (Warner Bros., 1972)
- Tokyo Rose (Warner Bros., 1989)

With Lalo Schifrin

- Enter the Dragon (soundtrack) (Warner Bros., 1973)

With Bola Sete

- Goin' to Rio (Columbia, 1973)

With Bud Shank

- Windmills of Your Mind (Pacific Jazz, 1969)

With Frank Sinatra

- Frank Sinatra Conducts Tone Poems of Color (Capitol, 1956)
- Sings for Only the Lonely (Capitol, 1958)
- Sinatra Swings (Reprise, 1961)
- Point of No Return (Capitol, 1962)
- All Alone (Reprise, 1962)
- Sinatra and Strings (Reprise, 1962)
- The Concert Sinatra (Reprise, 1963)
- Sinatra's Sinatra (Reprise, 1963)
- Sinatra Sings Days of Wine and Roses, Moon River, and Other Academy Award Winners (Reprise, 1964)
- It Might as Well Be Swing (Reprise, 1964)
- 12 Songs of Christmas (Reprise, 1964)
- Softly, as I Leave You (Reprise, 1964)
- My Kind of Broadway (Reprise, 1965)
- September of My Years (Reprise, 1965)
- Sinatra '65: The Singer Today (Reprise, 1965)
- Moonlight Sinatra (Reprise, 1966)
- Strangers in the Night (Reprise, 1966)
- That's Life (Reprise, 1966)
- Francis Albert Sinatra & Antônio Carlos Jobim (Reprise, 1967)
- The World We Knew (Reprise, 1967)
- Cycles (Reprise, 1968)
- My Way (Reprise, 1969)
- A Man Alone (Reprise, 1969)
- Sinatra & Company (Reprise, 1971)
- Ol' Blue Eyes Is Back (Reprise, 1973)
- Some Nice Things I've Missed (Reprise, 1974)
- Trilogy: Past Present Future (Reprise, 1980)

With Mel Tormé

- Broadway, Right Now! (Verve, 1960)
- Mel Tormé Sings Sunday in New York & Other Songs About New York (Atlantic, 1963)

With Tom Waits

- Small Change (Asylum, 1976)

With Mason Williams

- The Mason Williams Phonograph Record (Warner Bros., 1968)
