= Cole Español =

Studio album by Nat King Cole
- Released: August 1958
- Recorded: February 17, 18, 20 (Havana), June 11, 30, 1958 (Capitol)
- Studio: Capitol (Hollywood); Havana, Cuba
- Genre: Vocal jazz
- Length: 29:16
- Label: Capitol
- Producer: Lee Gillette

Nat King Cole chronology
Love Is the Thing (1957)	Cole Español (1958)	St. Louis Blues (1958)

Professional ratings
Review scores
Source	Rating
Allmusic	3.5/5 stars
The Rolling Stone Jazz Record Guide	1/5 stars

Cole Español is a 1958 studio album by Nat King Cole to the Latin market, arranged by Nelson Riddle. One of three Spanish themed albums that Cole recorded, it was followed by A Mis Amigos (1959) and by More Cole Español in 1962. The orchestral music was recorded in Havana, Cuba, and Cole added his vocals in June in Los Angeles, California. However the song "Tú, mi delirio" is instrumental; Cole overdubbed piano, rather than vocals to this track. The album was later reissued as Español and More, Vol. 1. The album was inducted into the Latin Grammy Hall of Fame in 2007. The album reached #12 on the Billboard magazine LP chart.

== Track listing ==
1. "Cachito" (Consuelo Velázquez) – 2:50
2. "María Elena" (Lorenzo Barcelata, Bob Russell) – 2:42
3. "Quizás, quizás, quizás (Perhaps, Perhaps, Perhaps)" (Osvaldo Farrés, Joe Davis) – 2:46
4. "Las mañanitas" (traditional) – 2:57
5. "Acércate más (Come Closer to Me)" (Osvaldo Farrés, Al Stewart) – 2:49
6. "El bodeguero (Grocer's Cha-Cha)" (Richard Egües) – 2:25
7. "Arrivederci Roma" (Renato Rascel, Pietro Garinei, Sandro Giovannini, Carl Sigman) – 2:46
8. "Noche de ronda" (Agustín Lara) – 2:34
9. "Tú, mi delirio" (César Portillo de la Luz) – 2:36
10. "Te quiero, dijiste (Magic Is the Moonlight)" (María Grever, Charles Pasquale) – 2:41
11. "Adelita" (traditional) – 2:10

== Personnel ==
=== Performance ===
- Nat King Cole – vocal, piano on "Tú, mi delirio"
- Nelson Riddle – arranger, conductor
- Armando Romeu Jr. – arranger, conductor
- Armando de Sequeira Romeu – drums
- Cuarteto Rivero - backing vocals on "Acércate Más"

== Certifications ==
Region	Certification	Certified units/sales
Brazil	—	300,000
Spain (Promusicae)	Gold	500,000
