= Those Lazy-Hazy-Crazy Days =

Those Lazy-Hazy-Crazy Days may refer to:

- Those Lazy-Hazy-Crazy Days of Summer (album), a 1963 album by Nat King Cole
- "Those Lazy-Hazy-Crazy Days of Summer", the title song of the Nat King Cole album
- "Those Lazy-Hazy-Crazy Days" (episode), an episode of the TV series Gilmore Girls
