= Satchmo In Style =

Satchmo in Style

Studio album by Louis Armstrong
- Released: May 14, 1959
- Recorded: 1949–1954
- Genre: Jazz
- Length: 56:27
- Label: Decca
- Producer: Milt Gabler

Louis Armstrong chronology
Porgy and Bess (1958)	Satchmo in Style (1959)	Bing & Satchmo (1960)

Satchmo in Style is a 1959 studio album by Louis Armstrong, arranged by Gordon Jenkins.

== Reception ==
Professional ratings
Review scores
Source	Rating
AllMusic	2/5 stars

The AllMusic review by Ken Dryden awarded the album two stars and said that "the jazz content is minimal and the music is plagued by the rather dated charts and a rather nauseating choir on over half of the tracks. Likewise, the strings (when present) are overbearing and haven't stood the test of time as well as Armstrong's warm vocals and still potent trumpet, though he isn't featured as a trumpeter all that much." Dryden praised Armstrong's duet with Velma Middleton on "You're Just In Love", and "I Want a Butter and Eggman".

== Track listing ==
1. "Blueberry Hill" (Vincent Rose, Al Lewis, Larry Stock) – 2:54
2. "It's All In the Game" (Carl Sigman, Charles Dawes) – 3:24
3. "Jeannine (I Dream of Lilac Time)" (Nathaniel Shilkret, L. Wolfe Gilbert) – 3:24
4. "Chloe" (Gus Kahn, Neil Moret) – 3:06
5. "Indian Love Call" (Rudolf Friml, Herbert Stothart, Oscar Hammerstein II, Otto Harbach) – 3:12
6. "Listen to the Mocking Bird" (Septimus Winner, Richard Milburn) – 3:06
7. "That Lucky Old Sun (Just Rolls Around Heaven All Day)" (Beasley Smith, Haven Gillespie) – 3:06
8. "The Whiffenpoof Song (Baa! Baa! Baa!)" (Tod Galloway, Meade Minnigerode, George S Pomeroy) – 2:59
9. "Trees" (Oscar Rasbach, Joyce Kilmer) – 3:06
10. "Bye and Bye" (Traditional) – 3:20
11. "Spooks!" (Matt Dubey, Harold Karr) – 2:37
12. "When It's Sleepy Time Down South" (Clarence Muse, Leon Renè, Otis Renè) – 3:14
13. "You're Just in Love" (Irving Berlin) – 2:43 (with Velma Middleton)
14. "If" (Stanley Damerell, Tolchard Evans) – 3:23
15. "I Want a Big Butter and Eggman" (Louis Armstrong, Percy Venable) – 3:17
16. "When It's Sleepy Time Down South" (alternative lyrics) – 3:14

== Personnel ==
- Louis Armstrong – trumpet, vocals
- Hollis King – art direction
- Sherniece Smith – art producer
- Jack Lesberg – double bass
- Arvell Shaw
- Phil Stephens
- Bob McCracken – clarinet:
- Isabelle Wong – design
- Johnny Blowers – drums
- Cozy Cole
- Nick Fatool
- Romeo Penque – flute, woodwind
- Carl Kress – guitar
- Allan Reuss
- Art Ryerson
- Philip Bailey – liner notes
- Kevin Reeves – mastering
- Peter Keepnews – notes editing
- Burt Korall – original liner notes
- Milt Gabler – producer
- Cynthia Sesso – photo research
- Charlie LaVere – piano
- Bernie Leighton
- Marty Napoleon
- Bryan Koniarz – production supervisor
- Ben Young – reissue producer
- Carlos Kase – research
- Wayne E. Songer – alto saxophone
- Milt Yaner
- Art Drelinger – tenor saxophone
- Dent Eckels
- Eddie Miller
- Thomas Parshley
- Red Ballard – trombone
- Will Bradley
- Billy Butterfield – trumpet
- Charles Gifford
- Chris Griffin
- Bruce Hudson
- Yank Lawson
- Carl Poole
- George Thow
- Velma Middleton – vocals
- George Berg – woodwind
- Gordon Jenkins – arranger, conductor
