= The Mancini Touch =

Studio album by Henry Mancini
- Released: 1960
- Recorded: August 10–14, 1959
- Studio: RCA Victor's Music Center of the World, Hollywood, Los Angeles
- Genre: Traditional pop
- Length: 39:14
- Label: RCA Victor LPM-2101

Henry Mancini chronology
More Music from Peter Gunn (1959)	The Mancini Touch (1960)	The Blues and the Beat (1960)

The Mancini Touch is a 1960 album by American composer and arranger Henry Mancini.

== Reception ==
Professional ratings
Review scores
Source	Rating
Allmusic	3/5 stars

Greg Adams reviewed the album for Allmusic and wrote that "The result is a carefully arranged album on which the soloists occasionally improvise". "Free and Easy" written for the Sal Mineo film Rock, Pretty Baby "...speaks to his popular focus in spite of the jazz trappings" and "Bijou" anticipates "the sound of "Baby Elephant Walk" and "The Pink Panther Theme"" Adams felt that the depiction of Mancini on the cover of the album as a "puppeteer controlling dancers", anticipated the "development of Muzak in the late '60s" with the "belief in the power of music to manipulate mood and action".

The initial Billboard magazine review from January 25, 1960 commented that "Henry Mancini proves on this fine new album that he can do more than the music for "Peter Gun" with this very attractive big band waxing that could turn into another best-seller. The outstanding Mancini arrangements are played by the 35-piece ork with a sharpness and precision that is a pleasure to hear…The stereo sound is excellent”.

== Track listing ==
1. "Bijou" (Ralph Burns) – 3:11
2. "Mostly for Lovers" (Henry Mancini, Paul Francis Webster) – 3:04
3. "Like Young" (Andre Previn) – 3:15
4. "My One and Only Love" (Robert Mellin, Guy Wood) – 3:16
5. "Politely" (Mancini) – 3:18
6. "Trav'lin' Light" (Johnny Mercer, Jimmy Mundy, Trummy Young) – 3:03
7. "Let's Walk" (Mancini) – 3:06
8. "Snowfall" (Claude Thornhill) – 3:40
9. "A Cool Shade of Blue" (Mancini) – 3:47
10. "Robbin's Nest" (Illinois Jacquet, Bob Russell, Sir Charles Thompson) – 3:40
11. "Free and Easy" (Mancini) – 2:47
12. "That's All" (Alan Brandt, Bob Haymes) – 3:07

== Personnel ==
- Henry Mancini – arranger, conductor
- Armand Karpoff, Raphael Kramer, Edgar Lustgarten, Kurt Reher – cello
- Shelly Manne – drums
- John Cave, Vincent DeRosa, John Graas, Richard Perissi, Claude Sherry – flugelhorn
- Bob Bain – guitar
- John Williams – piano
- Harry Klee, Ronnie Lang, Ted Nash – saxophone
- Karl de Karske, Johnny Halliburton, Richard Taylor "Dick" Nash, Jimmy Priddy – trombone
- Victor Feldman – vibraphone
- Stanley Harris, Harry Hyams, Millton Thomas – viola
- Samuel Cytron, Sam Freed, David Frisina, Benny Gill, Danny Guglielmi, Mort Herbert, Sarah Kreindler, Dan Lube, William Miller, Erno Neufeld, Lou Raderman, Ambrose Russo, Felix Slatkin – violin

Production

- Al Schmitt – engineer
- Hal Levy – liner notes
- Dick Peirce – producer
