= Alka-Seltzer Time =

Radio series

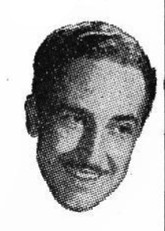
Curt Massey, c. 1945

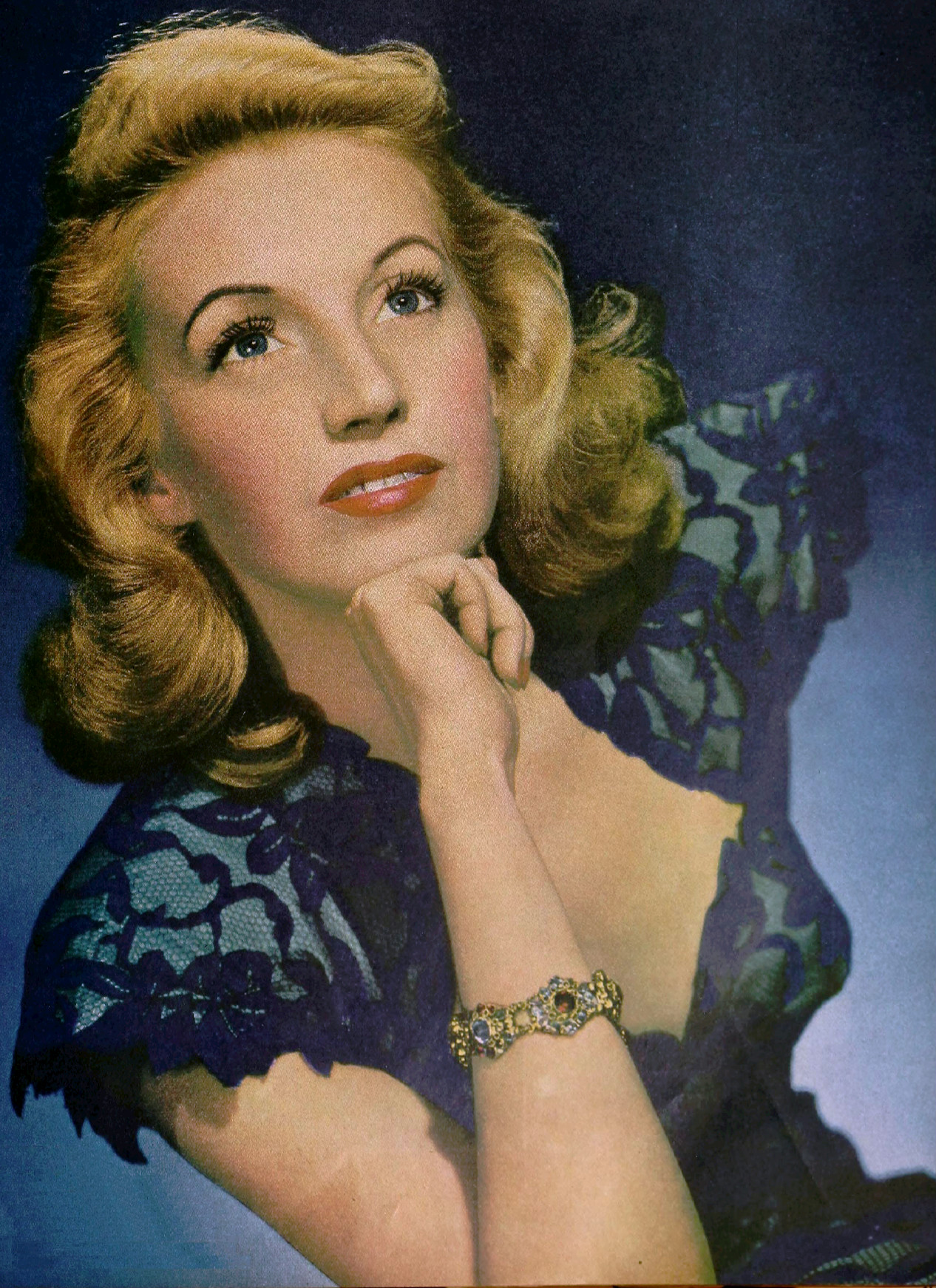
Martha Tilton on cover of April 1946 issue of Radio Mirror

Alka-Seltzer Time (aka The Alka-Seltzer Show) was a 15-minute radio series broadcast weekdays on both CBS Radio and the Mutual Broadcasting System (not to be confused with an earlier Alka-Seltzer Time that was renamed Herb Shriner Time).

Baritone Curt Massey starred with Martha Tilton when the program, sponsored by Alka-Seltzer, began in 1949 as Curt Massey Time (sometimes advertised as Curt Massey Time with Martha Tilton) with a title change to highlight the sponsor's product by 1952. The announcer was Ford Pearson.

Beginning on June 18, 1951, Alka-Seltzer Time ran on Mutual at noon while the CBS broadcasts continued at 6:30 pm. By 1953, the series was heard on Mutual (at noon, Eastern Time) and later that same day on CBS (at 5:45 pm, ET). Advertisements described the show as "informal song sessions" by vocalists Massey and Tilton, who was often billed as "the liltin' Martha Tilton". The two singers, both Texas-born, performed with Country Washburne and His Orchestra, featuring Charles LaVere on piano.

Songs included such tunes as "Honey, I'm in Love with You", "A Gambler's Guitar", "Just to Be with You", "Moonlight", "When Love Goes Wrong", "Choo Choo Train", "I've Got Spurs that Jingle Jangle Jingle", "Put on a Bonnet", "Collegiate", "On the Sunny Side of the Street", "Papaya Mama" and "Istanbul, Not Constantinople". There were some theme shows, such as "Go West", music from "Old Phonograph Records" and "Salute to Hawaii".

The broadcasts on Mutual ended on April 30, 1954, and those on CBS concluded on October 8, 1954. However, Massey and Tilton continued to appear together during the late 1950s, including having the Curt Massey-Martha Tilton Show on KRCA-TV in Los Angeles, beginning on October 29, 1956. They also performed on such shows as Guest Star and Stars for Defense. They also teamed up to record an album, We Sing the Old Songs (1957). CD collections of Alka-Seltzer Time usually identify shows by the first performed song of each program. Today, Massey is best remembered as the composer (with Paul Henning) and singer of the Petticoat Junction TV show theme song.
