= Kreindler =

Kreindler may refer to:

- Kreindler & Kreindler LLP, American law firm
- Arthur Kreindler (1900–1988), Romanian academic
- Doris Barsky Kreindler (1901–1974), American artist
- Eléna Wexler-Kreindler (1931-1992), Romanian mathematician
- Graig Kreindler (born 1980), American painter and illustrator
- Sarah Kreindler (1912–1993), American violinist
