= Charlie LaVere =

American jazz musician (1910–1983)

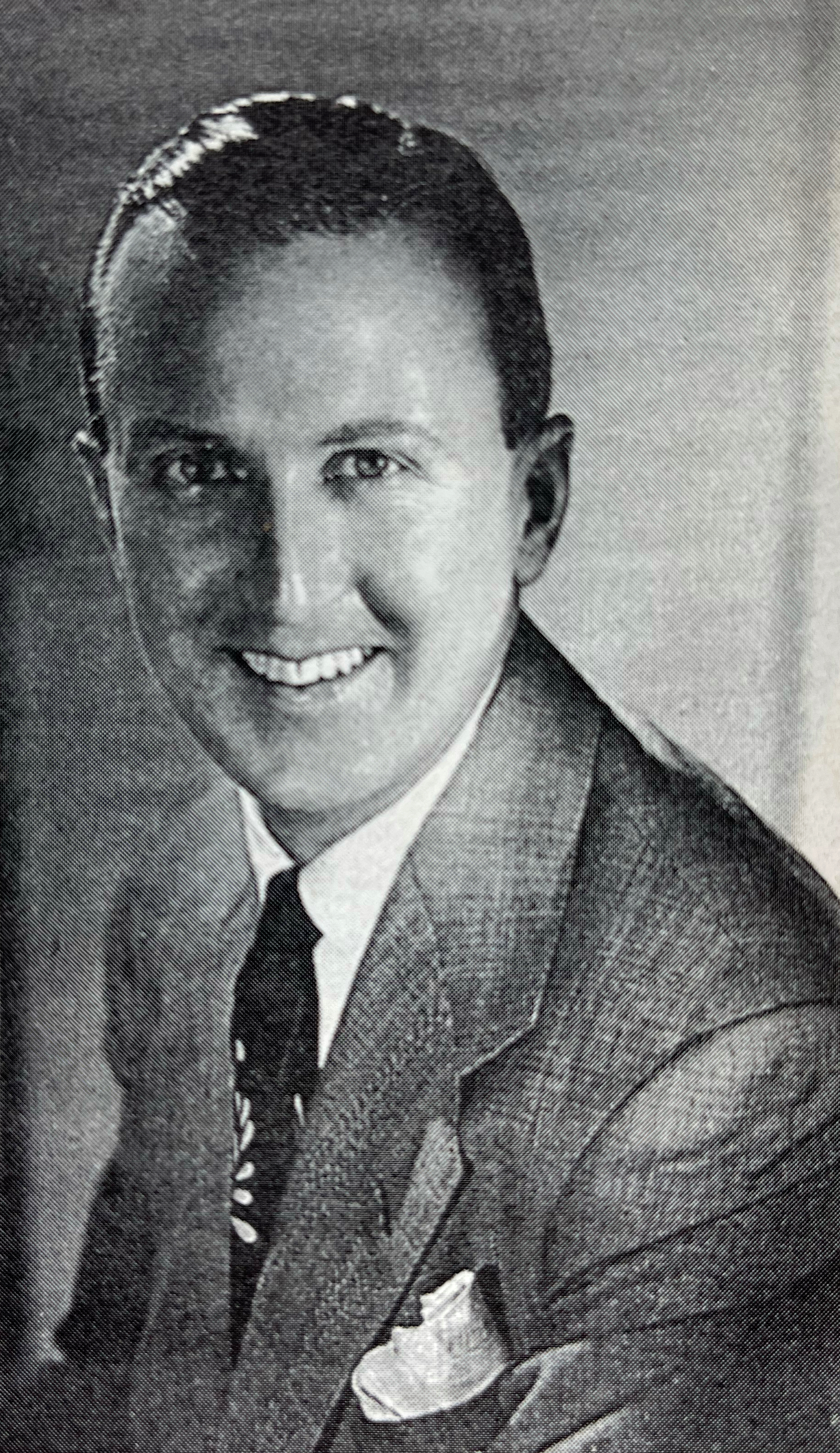
Charlie LaVere, 1949

Charles LaVere Johnson, better known as Charlie LaVere (July 18, 1910, Salina, Kansas – April 28, 1983, Ramona, California) was an American jazz pianist, vocalist, bandleader, and composer. He is best known for his extensive work with arranger Gordon Jenkins, including the 1 million seller “Maybe You’ll Be There”, his own dixie jazz group LaVere's Chicago Loopers, and his later work for Disneyland's Golden Horseshoe Revue, for which he composed the music and led the band performances from 1955 to 1959, and which would go on to become the longest running stage show in the history of show business, running for over 31 years and over 39,000 performances.

== Early life ==
LaVere's Father, a blacksmith for the Union Pacific Railroad, spent time working in Kansas City, where LaVere first acquired an interest in music. His first musical instrument was a cornet, though he later acquired an upright baritone horn, on which he learned to play many popular songs of the day. LaVere began studying piano in the 4th grade, which would prove to be his instrument of choice for the bulk of his career. At the age of twelve, LaVere attended a concert in Salina featuring Willard Robison and his Deep River Orchestra, and described the event as having a profound impact on his interest in jazz. LaVere studied piano throughout high school and performed in various recitals and assemblies. At the age of eighteen, LaVere visited Oklahoma City, where he was introduced to a number of like minded musicians, including Jack Teagarden and his brother Charlie Teagarden. LaVere studied music at the University of Oklahoma at Norman. He performed with Frank William's Oklahomans on campus and in local venues. The Oklahomans toured in the summer of 1929, performing in ballrooms and amusement parks throughout Iowa, Wisconsin, Illinois, Indiana, and Ohio. In the fall of 1929, Charlie Teagarden and LaVere found standing work at the Fort Pitt Hotel in Pittsburgh, followed by brief stints in New York at The Knickerbocker Hotel and Commodore Club Hotel during the Wall Street crash of 1929. After brief stints playing in various bands and venues around Pittsburgh and New York City, LaVere returned to Oklahoma City, where he formed a band with Wingy Manone, Harry Wynn, Les Jenkins, and LaVere's younger brother Ron, playing Abe Hale's Nightclub and Restaurant. In January 1931, LaVere performed with the Sam Robbins Band on the SS Empress of Bermuda, which ran six day round trips from New York City to Hamilton, Bermuda. At the Coliseum in Tulsa, Oklahoma, LaVere played a "Battle of Music" with Louis Armstrong, performing "Rockin' Chair" as a duet. LaVere would later describe the event as the greatest thrill of his music career.

== Music career ==
=== Chicago years (1932–1936) ===
LaVere relocated to Chicago in late 1932, where he shared an apartment with the Teagarden's and their spouses in the North end of the city. He began playing regularly with local artists, including Joe and Marty Marsala, Floyd Towne, Jim Barnes, Ray Biondi, Shorty Cherock, Larry Russel, Clark Galehouse, Carl Bean, Wingy Manone, and was awarded standing work with Wingy Manone and Jack Teagarden at The Brewery, near the World's Fair in the Spring and summer of 1933. He would perform his first recorded sessions in support of Manone and Teagarden the same year, in addition to leading his own bands.

After touring Texas and the mid-west with Eddie Neibauer and Dell Coon in 1934, LaVere returned to local Chicago venues, working regularly with Joe Marsala at the Cass Hotel. In the spring of 1935, LaVere assembled a multiracial group of musicians, dubbed Charles LaVere & His Chicagoans. LaVere met and befriended writer and jazz critic Helen Oakley, who was instrumental in gathering label interest to the band's work. The band recorded for Brunswick Records and Columbia Records, including the songs: "All Too Well," "Ubangi Man”, "Smiles", and "Boogaboo Blues”. The latter featured Jabbo Smith and LaVere sharing lead vocals on LaVere's composition and arrangement, an early example of inter-racial blues recording.

LaVere then found steady work in radio, performing on the Fibber McGee and Molly show for NBC, conducted by Rico Marcelli, recorded at the Merchandise Mart. LaVere also sang and arranged songs for a vocal group on WBBM's Milk Foundation Program featuring Lois Still. LaVere also performed regularly on The Johnson Wax Show. Head writer for the Johnson Wax Show, Don Quinn, encouraged LaVere to begin performing under his middle name to avoid confusion with the shows title. During this time, LaVere joined Henry Busse's band at the Chez Paree, for which LaVere created the band charts, performed on piano, and provided vocals, working shifts from 8pm to 3am over 6 week stints. After Busse departed the Chez Paree, LaVere briefly relocated to Fort Worth, Texas, performing in Paul Whiteman's group at the Frontier Fiesta, and later touring throughout Texas, Oklahoma, and Kansas, before heading West.

=== Hollywood years and Walt Disney (1937–1959) ===
Whiteman's band performed throughout Los Angeles, opening at the Ambassador Hotel on Christmas Eve of 1937. LaVere had quickly grown fond of Southern California's climate, and tendered his resignation to Whiteman soon after closing their tour, remaining behind while the group continued on to New York. After several idle months pending his transfer through the musicians union, LaVere joined Frank Trumbaure band for steady work at the Biltmore Bowl. In the fall of 1938, LaVere received a call to join Skinnay Ennis in the supporting band for Bob Hope's first radio show, The Pepsodent Show. As was typical for shows of the era, the broadcast ran for 39 weeks, through the winter of 1938–39, followed by a thirteen-week break in the summer. Over the summer break, Skinnay booked the band to perform in Beverly Hills at the Victor Hugo Restaurant. In Fall of 1939, LaVere was asked to support Bing Crosby Kraft Music Hall by John Scott Trotter. The show was performed year round, with two performances on Thursdays (one for the East Coast and a second for the West), a practice which Crosby favored even after the availability taping eliminated the need for it. The Kraft Music Hall was considered highly prestigious and known to feature some of the best talent in the business, and LaVere would remain with the show through 1947. LaVere continued working as a recording artist during this period of time, working for Decca Records at their studios on Melrose Avenue. There he recorded with The Andrews Sisters, Victor Young, John Scott Trotter, and Gordon Jenkins, in addition to recording under his own name. LaVere also regularly performed as a solo artist for private parties at the homes of Hollywood stars of the day, including Armand Deutsch, Jack Benny, George Burns, Cole Porter, Gary Cooper, Edgar Bergen, Jimmy Cagney, Robert Montgomery, John Wayne, and Emily Kimbrough. LaVere also composed during this period; his song "Cuban Boogie Woogie" was recorded by Charlie Barnet and Andy Kirk among others. Beginning in December 1942, LaVere had his own late night, fifteen minute radio broadcast show on the NBC Pacific Coast Network, broadcasting to California, Arizona, Nevada, Oregon, Utah, and Washington. The show was operated on a relatively meager budget, requiring only LaVere, the sound engineer, and the broadcast announcer. Each show consisted of four songs, with LaVere performing piano and vocals. The show ran until July 1942, when the 1942–1944 musician's strike halted broadcast recording, instigated by James C Petrillo. The strike had a significant impact on the union band dominated musical scene in America and is attributed with the decline of the Big Band era and the rise of vocalists.

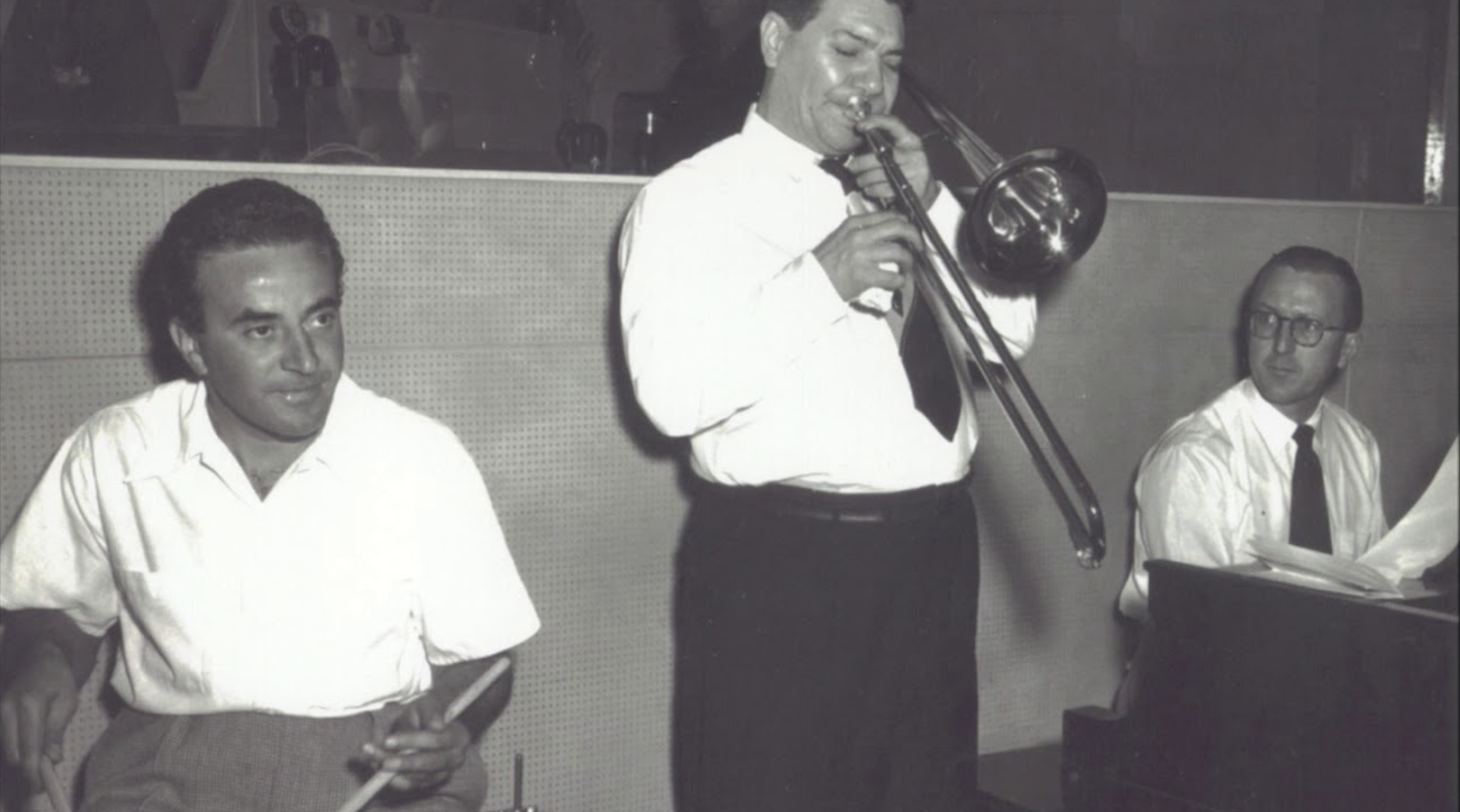
Nick Fatool, Jack Teagarden, Charles LaVere – February 1950

In response to the rising number of labels being formed as a result of the strike, LaVere formed the LaVere's Chicago Loopers in July 1944. The band featured Billy May, Artie Shapiro, Floyd O'Brien, Joe Venuti, Matty Matlock, Nick Fatool, and George Van Eps. The band recorded on various dates over 1944, 1945, 1948, and 1950 with some variations in members. Songs were recorded largely without written music, and included LaVere's original compositions "Very 8'n Boogie", "Love Lies", and "It's All In Your Mind", the latter featuring Jack Teagarden on vocals. LaVere contributed lead vocal to Gordon Jenkins' "Maybe You'll Be There", which was released on June 11, 1948. The recording was highly successful and spent 30 weeks on the charts, peaking at #3, and selling over a million records. The song would go on to become a pop standard, recorded by many artists, from Frank Sinatra to Bob Dylan. LaVere's Chicago Loopers performed live at the Dixieland Jubilee in October 1949 at the Shrine Auditorium. The event also featured performances by Castle Jazz Band, Kid Ory's Creole Band, Pete Dailey's Chicagoans, The Firehouse Five, Red Nichols Pennies. The performance was recorded and released on Decca Records. In March 1950, LaVere performed as part of Gordon Jenkins' Orchestra for Billie Holiday's final recordings with Decca Records. In 1951, LaVere once again joined Jenkins' to record a number of dates with Louis Armstrong. Songs recorded include "When It’s Sleepy Time Down South", "It’s All in the Game", "You’re Just In Love / If", "Big Butter and Egg Man", "You’re the Apple of My Eye", "Jeannine (I Dream of Lilac Time)", and "Indian Love Call".

LaVere also performed as a pianist and vocalist on the Alka-Seltzer Time radio show, with Curt Massey and Martha Tilton.

In the spring of 1955, Donald Novis contacted LaVere with the opportunity to audition a group for Walt Disney's Disneyland, which was scheduled to open later that year. Disney hired the group, which included Jerry King (drums), Frank Wylie, lyricist Tom Adair and LaVere on piano. Adair and LaVere set about composing four original songs to be performed at the Golden Horseshoe Revue, which were performed for Walt Disney in the 3 months leading up to the opening, with Disney offering notes and feedback. The finished show included opener "Hello Everybody, "Bill Bailey Won't You Please Come Home", "Dear Old Donegal", "Leprechaun Lullaby", "Beautiful Dreamer" by Stephen Foster, "A Lady Has to Mind Her P’s and Q’s" or "Riverboat Blues", and the finale "Pecos Bill", and debuted on July 18 of 1955, LaVere's 45th birthday, and featured vocal performances by Donald Novis, Wally Boag, and Judy Marsh. LaVere led the band performances at the Golden Horseshoe from 1955 to 1959. On December 19 and 28 of 1956, as part of Gordon Jenkins' Orchestra, LaVere recorded Nat King Cole's Love Is the Thing. LaVere joined Gordon Jenkins once again on Judy Garland's 1959 album, The Letter, which featured LaVere on vocals for "Charley's Blues".

=== Las Vegas years (1959–1963) ===
LaVere was introduced to George Burns at a party, and was recruited to perform in Burns' show at the Sahara Las Vegas and Harrah's Lake Taheo in 1959 with Bobby Darin, with The Chordettes added to the roster in 1960. During a brief stint with his own sextet in New York City in 1960, LaVere created an original composition "Misery and The Blues" which he provided to Jack Teagarden, who recorded and released the song on his 1961 release Mis'ry and The Blues, in addition to a newly recorded version of LaVere's "It's All in Your Mind". LaVere played solo piano in clubs and also worked with Bob Crosby to arrange his Bob-Cats 1961–1962. LaVere then reunited with and Wingy Manone in 1963, in addition to performing with Danny Sherrett.

=== Late career (1964–1983) ===
As rock music became more popular, LaVere's work became more sporadic. In 1964, LaVere accepted a position as assistant conductor at the Melodyland Theater. He also performed piano and accordion on cruise ships running between California and Australia. In Las Vegas, LaVere arranged and performed with Russ Morgan in 1967. LaVere continued to work with Gordon Jenkins, performing on Harry Nilsson's album of jazz standards, A Little Touch of Schmilsson in the Night in 1973. From the 1960s onward he ran his own piano repair shop in the San Diego area, in addition to performing solo residencies at resorts in California, Oregon, and Colorado.

== Discography ==
Year	Artists	Title(s)	Role	Release
1930	Jack Teagarden & His Orchestra	I've Got "It"; Shake Your Hips; Somebody Stole Gabriel's Horn; I Would If I Could But I Can't	Piano	Columbia Records
1935	Charles LaVere & His Chicagoans	All Too Well; Smiles; Boogaboo Blues (w/Jabbo Smith); Ubangi Man	Lead Vocal	Recorded for Okeh Records, featured on compilations for Tax Records & Columbia Records.
1937	Ben Pollack's "Pick a Rib" Boys	California Here I Come	Piano	Decca Records
1938	Hoagy Carmichael & Ella Logan	Two Sleepy People	Piano	Brunswick Records
1942	John Scott Trotter and his Orchestra	Kitten on the Keys; Maple Leaf Rag	Piano	Decca Records
1942	Johnny Mercer	My Sugar is So Refined; Sugar Blues	Piano	Capitol Records
1944	LaVere's Chicago Loopers	Sunday; Baby Won't You Please Come Home; Subdivided in F; I'm Coming Virginia; Lazy River; If I Had You; Very 8-'N Boogie; Exactly Like You; Carolina in the Morning; Royal Reserve Blues; Blue Lou; Can't We Talk It Over; It's All In Your Mind; Lover; Love Lies; A Monday Date	Piano; Composer ("It's All in Your Mind")	Jump Records
1947	Gordon Jenkins Orchestra	My Funny Valentine	Lead Vocal	Decca Records
1947	Gordon Jenkins Orchestra	Write Me a Letter	Lead Vocal	Decca Records
1947	Gordon Jenkins Orchestra	Linda	Lead Vocal	Decca Records
1948	Gordon Jenkins Orchestra	Maybe You'll Be There	Lead Vocal	Decca Records
1949	Charles LaVere & 4 Hits and a Miss with Gordon Jenkins Orchestra	A Dreamer with a Penny; Have a Little Sympathy	Lead Vocal	Decca Records
1949	Charlie LaVere's Chicago Loopers	Dixieland Jubilee: Who's Sorry Now	Piano	Decca Records
1950	Charles LaVere	You Wish Me All the Luck in the World; I Don't Want to Be President	Lead Vocal	Decca Records
1950	Gordon Jenkins Orchestra	Don't Do Something to Someone Else (That You Wouldn't Want Done to You)	Lead Vocal	Decca Records
1950	Billie Holiday	God Bless the Child; This is Heaven to Me	Piano (w/Gordon Jenkins Orchestra)	Decca Records
1951	Gordon Jenkins Orchestra	I Wish Someone Knew I Was Lonesome	Lead Vocal	Decca Records
1951	Louis Armstrong	Jeannine (I Dream of Lilac Time); When It's Sleepy Time Down South; Indian Love Call; Big Butter and Eggman; Basin Street Blues, Pts. 1& 2; If; It's All in the Game; You're Just in Love	Piano	Decca Records
1951	Sextette from Hunger	Moon Over Muncie; A Yokel from Yonkers	Piano; Co-composer ("Moon Over Muncie")	Unissued
1953	Gordon Jenkins Orchestra	One Wild Oat; When They Speak of You	Lead Vocal	Decca Records
1953	Gordon Jenkins Orchestra & Charlie LaVere	Gomen-Nasai; The Ties That Bind	Lead Vocal	Decca Records
1955	Gordon Jenkins Orchestra	My Love Came Back to Me	Lead Vocal	Decca Records
1957	Golden Horseshoe Revue	Overture; Opening: "Hello Everybody"; Bill Bailey; Dear Old Donegal; Leprechaun Lullaby; Beautiful Dreamer; A Lady Has to Mind Her P's and G's; Pecos Bill; Offenbach's & Can-Can; What Have We Here (Wally Boag's Fun and Hi Jinks)	Music Composer ("Hello Everybody", "A Lady Has to Mind Her P's and Q's", "What Have We Here", "Riverboat Blues"); Arranger; Band Leader; Piano	Disneyland Records
1957	Nat King Cole	Love is the Thing Recording Sessions: Love Letters; Maybe It's Because I Love You Too Much; Stardust; It's All in the Game; When I Fall in Love; Ain't Misbehavin' (I'm Savin' My Love For You); When Sunny Gets Blue; Love is the Thing; At Last; Stay as Sweet as You Are; I Thought About Marie; Where Can I Go Without You?	Piano (w/Gordon Jenkins Orchestra)	Capitol Records
1959	Judy Garland	The Letter: Charley's Blues	Lead Vocal	Capitol Records
1964	Gordon Jenkins Orchestra	What Can I Say (After I Say I'm Sorry)	Lead Vocal	Kapp Records
1973	Harry Nilsson	A Little Touch of Schmilsson in the Night	Piano; Arrangements	RCA Records
