= Mis'ry and the Blues =

Studio album by Jack Teagarden
- Released: 1961
- Recorded: June 1961
- Studio: Chicago, IL
- Genre: Jazz
- Length: 39:22
- Label: Verve; V/V6 8416
- Producer: Creed Taylor

Jack Teagarden chronology
The Dixie Sound of Jack Teagarden (1961)	Mis'ry and the Blues (1961)	Chicago and All That Jazz! (1962)

Mis'ry and the Blues is an album by trombonist/vocalist Jack Teagarden recorded in Chicago in 1961 and released by the Verve label.

== Reception ==
Professional ratings
Review scores
Source	Rating
Allmusic	4/5 stars
The Penguin Guide to Jazz Recordings	3.5/4 stars

Allmusic awarded the album 4 stars with Scott Yanow stating "Trombonist Jack Teagarden's Verve recordings, his last batch of studio sides, have tended to be underrated. Teagarden was actually still in prime form up until the time of his unexpected death in early 1964. Whether taking trombone solos or singing, Teagarden sounds inspired by the fresh material throughout".

== Track listing ==
1. "Don't Tell a Man About His Woman" (Willard Robison) – 2:57
2. "Basin Street Blues" (Spencer Williams) – 5:11
3. "Froggie Moore" (Jelly Roll Morton, Reb Spikes, John Spikes) – 2:53
4. "I Don't Want to Miss Mississippi" (Seger Ellis) – 4:18
5. "It's All in Your Mind" (Charlie LaVere) – 4:34
6. "Mis'ry and the Blues" (Charlie LaVere) – 5:22
7. "Original Dixieland One-Step" (Original Dixieland Jazz Band) – 5:00
8. "Love Lies" (Terry Shand) – 3:26
9. "Afternoon in August" (Bill Stegmeyer) – 3:25
10. "Peaceful Valley" (Robison) – 2:44

== Personnel ==
- Jack Teagarden – trombone, vocals
- Don Goldie – trumpet
- Henry Cuesta – clarinet
- Don Ewell – piano
- Stan Puls – bass
- Ronnie Greb – drums
- Charlie LaVere (tracks 1, 5, 6 & 8), Sid Feller (track 4), Bill Stegmeyer (track 9) – arranger
- Shay Torrent – organ (track 8)
