= Let's Face the Music! =

Studio album by Nat King Cole
- Released: February 3 1964
- Recorded: November 20–22, 1961
- Genre: Vocal jazz
- Length: 31:38
- Label: Capitol
- Producer: Lee Gillette

Nat King Cole chronology
Where Did Everyone Go? (1963)	Let's Face the Music! (1964)	I Don't Want to Be Hurt Anymore (1964)

Let's Face the Music! is a 1964 studio album by Nat King Cole, arranged by Billy May. It was recorded in November 1961, and released three years later.

== Reception ==
Professional ratings
Review scores
Source	Rating
AllMusic	3.5/5 stars
Record Mirror	3/5 stars

The Billboard review from February 29, 1964 commented that "The fine blend of Cole singing is beautifully melded with the smart, witty and swinging backing supplied by Billy May...The tempos are mostly in that grand, finger-poppin middle tempo that is just May's cup of tea'".

== Track listing ==
1. "Day In, Day Out" (Rube Bloom, Johnny Mercer) – 2:25
2. "Bidin' My Time" (George Gershwin, Ira Gershwin) – 2:27
3. "When My Sugar Walks Down the Street" (Gene Austin, Jimmy McHugh, Irving Mills) – 2:10
4. "Warm and Willing" (Ray Evans, Jay Livingston, McHugh) – 3:01 **
5. "I'm Gonna Sit Right Down and Write Myself a Letter" (Fred E. Ahlert, Joe Young) – 2:37
6. "Cold, Cold Heart" (Hank Williams) – 3:45 **
7. "Something Makes Me Want to Dance with You" (Colin Romoff, Danny Meehan) – 2:09
8. "Moon Love" (Mack David, André Kostelanetz) – 2:11 **
9. "The Rules of the Road" (Cy Coleman, Carolyn Leigh) – 2:45
10. "Ebony Rhapsody" (Sam Coslow, Arthur Johnston) – 3:04
11. "Too Little, Too Late" (Arthur Kent, Jerry Grant) – 2:59
12. "Let's Face the Music and Dance" (Irving Berlin) – 2:25

== Personnel ==
- Nat King Cole – vocals, Hammond organ
- Billy May – arranger, conductor
- Jimmy Rowles - piano
- **Heinie Beau – arranger
