= Gordon Jenkins =

American arranger, composer, and pianist (1910–1984)

Background information
- Born: Gordon Hill Jenkins; May 12, 1910; Webster Groves, Missouri, U.S.
- Died: May 1, 1984 (aged 73) Malibu, California, U.S.
- Genre: Popular music
- Occupations: Composer, arranger, conductor, musician
- Instrument: Piano
- Years active: 1930s–1980s

Gordon Hill Jenkins (May 12, 1910 – May 1, 1984) was an American arranger, composer, and pianist who was influential in popular music in the 1940s and 1950s. Jenkins worked with The Andrews Sisters, Johnny Cash, The Weavers, Frank Sinatra, Louis Armstrong, Judy Garland, Nat King Cole, Billie Holiday, Harry Nilsson, Peggy Lee and Ella Fitzgerald.

== Biography ==
=== Career ===
Gordon Jenkins was born in Webster Groves, Missouri. He began his career writing arrangements for a radio Station in St. Louis. He was hired by Isham Jones, the director of a dance band known for its ensemble playing, which gave Jenkins the opportunity to develop his skills in melodic scoring. He also conducted The Show Is On on Broadway.

After the Jones band broke up in 1936, Jenkins worked as a freelance arranger and songwriter, contributing to sessions by Isham Jones, Paul Whiteman, Benny Goodman, Andre Kostelanetz, Lennie Hayton, and others. In 1938, Jenkins moved to Hollywood and worked for Paramount Pictures and NBC, and then became Dick Haymes' arranger for four years. In 1944, Jenkins had a hit song with "San Fernando Valley". In the 1940s, he was music director for the radio version of the program Mayor of the Town, and his orchestra provided the music for Ransom Sherman's program on CBS.

In 1945, Jenkins joined Decca Records. In 1947, he had his first million-seller with "Maybe You'll Be There" featuring vocalist Charles LaVere and, in 1949, had a hit with Victor Young's film theme "My Foolish Heart", which was also a success for Billy Eckstine. At the same time, he regularly arranged for and conducted the orchestra for various Decca artists, including Dick Haymes ("Little White Lies", 1947), Ella Fitzgerald ("Happy Talk", 1949, "Black Coffee", 1949, "Baby", 1954), Billie Holiday ("Crazy He Calls Me", "You're My Thrill", "Please Tell Me Now", "Somebody's on My Mind", 1949, and conducted and produced her last Decca session with "God Bless the Child", "This Is Heaven to Me", 1950), Patty Andrews of the Andrews Sisters ("I Can Dream, Can't I", 1949) and Louis Armstrong ("Blueberry Hill", 1949 and "When It's Sleepy Time Down South", 1951).

Jenkins wrote the score for the Broadway revue Along Fifth Avenue, starring Nancy Walker and Jackie Gleason, which ran for 180 performances in 1949.

The liner notes to Verve Records' 2001 reissue of one of Jenkins' albums with Armstrong, Satchmo In Style, quote Decca's A & R director Milt Gabler, saying that Jenkins "stood up on his little podium so that all the performers could see him conduct. But before he gave a downbeat, Gordon made a speech about how much he loved Louis and how this was the greatest moment in his life. And then he cried."

During this time, Jenkins also began recording and performing under his own name. One of his enduring works while at Decca was a pair of Broadway-style musical vignettes, Manhattan Tower and "California" which saw release several times (78s, 45s, and LP) in the 1940s and 1950s. The two were paired on a very early Decca LP in 1949, and Jenkins was given the Key to New York City by its mayor when Jenkins's orchestra performed the 16-minute suite on The Ed Sullivan Show in the early 1950s. Manhattan Tower was also a Patti Page LP album, issued by Mercury Records as catalog number MG-20226 in 1956. It is her version of Gordon Jenkins' popular 1948/1956 Manhattan Tower suite and the album charted at No. 18 on the Billboard charts. The album was reissued, combined with the 1956 Patti Page album You Go to My Head, in compact disc format, by Sepia Records on September 4, 2007. Jenkins also made a rare excursion into film work in 1952 when he scored the action film Bwana Devil, the first 3-D movie shot in color.

His Seven Dreams released in 1953 included "Crescent City Blues", which was the source for Johnny Cash's popular recording, "Folsom Prison Blues". In 1956, he expanded Manhattan Tower to almost three times its length, released it (this time on Capitol Records), and performed it on an hour-long television show. (Both versions of "Manhattan Tower" are currently available on CD.) His final long-form work was The Future, which made up the entire third disk of Frank Sinatra's 1980 Grammy-nominated Trilogy album. Although the piece was savaged by critics, Sinatra reportedly loved the semi-biographical work and felt that Jenkins was treated unfairly by the media.

Jenkins headlined New York's Capitol Theater between 1949 and 1951 and the Paramount Theater in 1952. He appeared in Las Vegas in 1953 and many times thereafter. He worked for NBC as a TV producer from 1955 to 1957, and performed at the Hollywood Bowl in 1964. By 1949, Jenkins was musical director at Decca, and he signed – despite resistance from Decca's management – the Weavers, a Greenwich Village folk ensemble that included Pete Seeger among its members. The combination of the Weavers' folk music with Jenkins' orchestral arrangements became popular. Their most notable collaboration was a version of Lead Belly's "Goodnight Irene" (1950) backed by Jenkins' adaptation of the Israeli folk song, "Tzena, Tzena, Tzena". Other notable songs they recorded together are "The Roving Kind", "On Top of Old Smoky" (1951), and "Wimoweh" (1952).

Also while at Decca Records Jenkins arranged and conducted several songs for Peggy Lee including her 1952 major hit recording of Rodgers and Hart's "Lover", which she also performed in the Warner Bros. remake of The Jazz Singer (1952 film). Lee also had chart successes with the Jenkins-arranged "Be Anything (But Be Mine)" and "Just One of Those Things".

After a brief stint with RCA's "X" Records which produced the album Gordon Jenkins' Almanac in 1956, Jenkins was hired by Capitol, where he worked with Frank Sinatra, notably on the albums Where Are You? (1957) and No One Cares (1959), and Nat King Cole, with whom he had his greatest successes; Jenkins was responsible for the lush arrangements on the 1957 album Love Is the Thing (Capitol's first stereo release, which included "When I Fall in Love", and "Star Dust" two of Cole's best-known recordings), as well as the albums The Very Thought of You (1958) and Where Did Everyone Go? (1963). Jenkins also wrote the music and lyrics for Judy Garland's 1959 album The Letter which also featured vocalist Charles LaVere, and conducted several of Garland's London concerts in the early 1960s.

Whilst most of Jenkins' arrangements at Capitol were in his distinctive string-laden style, he continued to demonstrate more versatility when required, particularly on albums such as A Jolly Christmas From Frank Sinatra (1957), which opens with a swinging version of "Jingle Bells", and Nat King Cole's album of spirituals, Every Time I Feel The Spirit (1960), which includes several tracks with a pronounced $\textstyle\frac{2}{4}$ beat that might almost be described as rock. He also produced a diverse set of charts for his critically acclaimed 1960 album Gordon Jenkins Presents Marshal Royal, a jazz-pop crossover project with Count Basie's alto saxophonist which included both strings and a swinging rhythm section.

However, as rock and roll gained ascendancy in the 1960s, Jenkins' lush string arrangements fell out of favor and he worked only sporadically. However, Sinatra, who had left Capitol to start his own label, Reprise Records, continued to call upon the arranger's services at various intervals over the next two decades, on albums such as All Alone (1962), September of My Years (1965), for which Jenkins won a Grammy Award, Ol' Blue Eyes Is Back (1973), and She Shot Me Down (1981). Jenkins also worked with Harry Nilsson, arranging and conducting A Little Touch of Schmilsson in the Night (1973), an album of jazz standards. The Nilsson sessions, with Jenkins conducting, were recorded on video and later broadcast as a television special by the BBC.

Although best known as an arranger, Jenkins also wrote several well-known songs, including "P.S. I Love You", "Goodbye" (Benny Goodman's sign-off tune), "Blue Prelude" (with Joe Bishop), "This Is All I Ask", and "When a Woman Loves a Man". Jenkins also composed both the "Future" suite and the entire "Future" section of Sinatra's 1980 concept album Trilogy: Past Present Future, and scored the music for the 1980 film The First Deadly Sin, which starred Sinatra in his last major film role.

=== Personal life ===
Jenkins married high school sweetheart Nancy Harkey in 1931 and had three children: Gordon Jr., Susan, and Page. In 1946, he divorced Harkey and married Beverly Mahr, one of the singers in his band. They had a son, Bruce. Jenkins also recorded an album with Beverly Jenkins for Impulse! in 1964, entitled Gordon Jenkins Presents My Wife The Blues Singer.

Toward the end of his life, he was in a near-fatal automobile accident, which left him debilitated. Nonetheless, he conducted a full orchestra for a recording session in spite of his pain.

Jenkins died of Lou Gehrig's disease in Malibu, California, eleven days shy of his 74th birthday.

His son, sports writer Bruce Jenkins, wrote a biography on his late father in 2005, titled 'Goodbye: In search of Gordon Jenkins' including a rare interview with Frank Sinatra among others for insights into Jenkins' process.

Jenkins' granddaughter, singer/songwriter Ella Dawn Jenkins, known as EllaHarp, is a career musician in San Francisco.

== Awards ==
In 1966, Jenkins received a Grammy Award for Best Instrumental Arrangement Accompanying Vocalist(s) for Frank Sinatra's rendition of the song "It Was a Very Good Year".

== Discography ==
- 1953 Seven Dreams (Decca Records)
- 1956 Manhattan Tower (Capitol Records)
- 1956 Gordon Jenkins' Almanac (Vik Records)
- 1957 Night Dreams with the Ralph Brewster Singers (Capitol Records)
- 1957 Stolen Hours (Capitol Records)
- 1958 In the Still of the Night (Mellow Music with a Latin Touch) (Decca Records)
- 1962 The Magic World of Gordon Jenkins (Columbia Records)
- 1962 Soul of a People (Mainstream Records)
- 1964 Paris I Wish You Love (Time Records)
- 1964 The Great Movie Themes of the 30's, 40's & 50's (Vee-Jay Records)
- 1966 Soft Soul (Dot Records)
- 1967 Blue Prelude (Sunset Records)

=== Orchestrations for Nat King Cole ===
- 1957 Love Is the Thing (Capitol Records)
- 1958 The Very Thought of You (Capitol Records)
- 1959 Every Time I Feel the Spirit (Capitol Records)
- 1963 Where Did Everyone Go? (Capitol Records)

=== Orchestrations for Frank Sinatra ===
==== Capitol albums ====
- 1957 A Jolly Christmas From Frank Sinatra
- 1957 Where Are You?
- 1959 No One Cares

==== Reprise albums ====
- 1962 All Alone
- 1965 September of My Years
- 1973 Ol' Blue Eyes Is Back
- 1974 Some Nice Things I've Missed
- 1980 "Future" suite – Trilogy: Past Present Future
- 1981 She Shot Me Down

=== Orchestrations for others ===
- 1951 Hoagy Carmichael – My Resistance Is Low
- 1951 The Andrews Sisters – The Windmill Song
- 1951 The Weavers – Wimoweh
- 1955 Ella Fitzgerald – Miss Ella Fitzgerald & Mr Gordon Jenkins Invite You to Listen and Relax
- 1957 Judy Garland – Alone
- 1958 Danny Kaye "Mommy, Gimme A Drinka Water" (Capitol Records)
- 1959 Judy Garland – The Letter
- 1964 Robert Goulet Manhattan Tower
- 1964 Beverly Jenkins – Gordon Jenkins Presents My Wife The Blues Singer
- 1965 Jimmy Durante – Jimmy Durante's Way of Life...
- 1967 Charles Aznavour - His Kind of Love Songs (Reprise Records)
- 1973 Harry Nilsson – A Little Touch of Schmilsson in the Night
