= Those Lazy-Hazy-Crazy Days of Summer =

Studio album by Nat King Cole
- Released: May 1963
- Recorded: April 11, May 15, 16, 1963
- Studio: Capitol (Hollywood)
- Genre: Jazz; Pop
- Length: 26:50
- Label: Capitol
- Producer: Lee Gillette

Nat King Cole chronology
More Cole Español (1962)	Those Lazy-Hazy-Crazy Days of Summer (1963)	Where Did Everyone Go? (1963)

Professional ratings
Review scores
Source	Rating
Allmusic	3.5/5 stars
New Record Mirror	4/5 stars
The Encyclopedia of Popular Music	3/5 stars

Those Lazy-Hazy-Crazy Days of Summer is a 1963 album by Nat King Cole, arranged by Ralph Carmichael. The album reached #14 on Billboard's LP chart.

== Track listing ==
1. "Those Lazy-Hazy-Crazy Days of Summer" (Hans Carste, Charles Tobias) – 2:25
2. "Get Out and Get Under the Moon" (William Jerome, Larry Shay, Tobias) – 2:09
3. "There is a Tavern in the Town" (Nat King Cole, Traditional) – 1:36
4. "On a Bicycle Built for Two" (Cole, Steve Gillette) – 1:46
5. "That Sunday, That Summer" (Joe Sherman, George David Weiss) – 3:10
6. "On the Sidewalks of New York" (Edith Bergdahl, Cole) – 2:17
7. "Our Old Home Town" (Haven Gillespie, Shay) – 1:40
8. "After the Ball" (Charles K. Harris) – 2:02
9. "You Tell Me Your Dream" (Cole) – 2:18
10. "That's What They Meant (By the Good Old Summertime)" (Al Frisch, Tobias) – 2:35
11. "Don't Forget" (Sherman, Weiss) – 2:00
12. "In the Good Old Summer Time" (Cole, George "Honey Boy" Evans, Ren Shields) – 1:30
13. "Those Lazy-Hazy-Crazy Days of Summer (Reprise)" – 1:22

== Personnel ==
=== Performance ===
- Nat King Cole – vocal
- Ralph Carmichael – arranger, conductor, choir

=== 1st session: April 11, 1963 ===
- Piano: Jimmy Rowles
- Guitar: Laurindo Almeida, Bobby Gibbons, Al Hendrickson
- Bass guitar: Joe Comfort
- Drums: Frank Carlson
- Percussion: Larry Bunker
- Strings: Alex Borisoff, Emil Briano, Arthur Brown, Harold Dicterow, Jesse Ehrlich, Cecil Figelski, Elliott Fisher, Hyman Gold, Allan Harshman, Lou Klass, Sarah Kreindler, William Kurasch, Alfred Lustgarten, Emmanuel Moss, Alexander Murray, Gareth Nuttycombe, Lou Raderman, Isadore Roman, Nathan Ross, William Vandenburg

=== 2nd session: May 15, 1963 ===
- Piano: Milton Raskin
- Guitar: Bobby Gibbons, Al Hendrickson
- Bass guitar: Joe Comfort
- Drums: Frank Carlson
- Percussion: Larry Bunker
- Strings: Victor Arno, Arnold Belnick, Emil Briano, Jimmy Getzoff, Nathan Ross, Sid Sharp (concertmaster), Paul Shure, Gerald Vinci
- Tuba: Tommy Johnson
- Other: Alvino Rey

=== 3rd session: May 16, 1963 ===
- Piano: Milton Raskin
- Guitar: Bobby Gibbons, Al Hendrickson
- Bass guitar: Joe Comfort
- Drums: Irving Cottler
- Percussion: Larry Bunker
- Strings: Victor Arno, Israel Baker, Harold Dicterow, Elliott Fisher, David Frisina, Jimmy Getzoff, Paul Shure, Gerald Vinci
- Tuba: Tommy Johnson
- Other: Alvino Rey
