= Those Lazy-Hazy-Crazy Days of Summer (song) =

Single by Nat King Cole

from the album Those Lazy-Hazy-Crazy Days of Summer
- B-side: "In The Cool Of The Day"
- Released: May 1963
- Studio: Capitol (Hollywood)
- Genre: Easy listening
- Length: 2:22
- Label: Capitol
- Songwriter(s): Hans Carste; Charles Tobias
- Producer(s): Lee Gillette

Nat King Cole singles chronology
"All Over the World" (1963)	"Those Lazy-Hazy-Crazy Days of Summer" (1963)	"That Sunday, That Summer" (1963)

"Those Lazy-Hazy-Crazy Days of Summer" is a popular song composed by Hans Carste. It was originally written as "Du spielst 'ne tolle Rolle", with German lyrics by Hans Bradtke (de), and was first recorded under that title in 1962 by Willy Hagara.

== Nat King Cole recording ==
In 1963, it was recorded by Nat King Cole, with English lyrics written by Charles Tobias on a theme of nostalgia. Cole's version, arranged by Ralph Carmichael and produced by Lee Gillette, reached number 6 on the US Hot 100. On the US Middle-Road Singles chart, "Those Lazy-Hazy-Crazy Days of Summer" reached number 3. It was the opening track of Cole's 1963 album of the same name.

=== Chart performance ===
Chart (1963)	Peak position
US Billboard Middle-Road Singles	3
US Billboard Hot 100	6
US Billboard Hot R&B Singles	11

== Copyrights ==
=== Original copyrights ===
Catalog of Copyright Entries, Third Series, Music, Library of Congress, Copyright Office

1. Vol. 17; Part 5, No. 2, July–December 1963 (1964). "Du spielst 'ne tolle Rolle". © Edition Primus Rolf Budde KG; 13 Feb 1962; EP28432. p. 1314.
2. Vol. 17; Part 5, No. 1, January–June 1963 (1964). "Those Lazy-Hazy-Crazy Days of Summer". © on English lyrics & new version; Comet Music Corp.; 6 May 1963; EP175569. p. 598.
