= More Cole Español =

Studio album by Nat King Cole
- Released: 1962
- Recorded: March 6–9, 1962
- Studio: Musart (Mexico City)
- Genre: Vocal jazz
- Length: 29:04
- Label: Capitol
- Producer: Lee Gillette

Nat King Cole chronology
Dear Lonely Hearts (1962)	More Cole Español (1962)	Those Lazy-Hazy-Crazy Days of Summer (1963)

More Cole Español is a 1962 studio album by Nat King Cole, arranged by Ralph Carmichael and recorded in Mexico City.

This was Cole's third and last album of Spanish themed music, following Cole Español (1958) and A Mis Amigos (1959).

== Reception ==
Professional ratings
Review scores
Source	Rating
AllMusic	3.5/5 stars
New Record Mirror	4/5 stars
The Rolling Stone Jazz Record Guide	1/5 stars

The AllMusic review by William Ruhlmann awarded the album three and a half stars, and said that compared to his two other Spanish albums Cole "still didn't sound like he always knew what he was singing, and he still seemed to be working on his pronunciation, but on More Cole Español he was clearly having a lot more fun."

== Track listing ==
1. "La Feria de Las Flores" - 1:49
2. "Guadalajara" - 2:02
3. "La Golondrina (The Swallow)" - 2:57
4. "Tres Palabras (Without You)" (Osvaldo Farres) - 2:07
5. "Piel Canela" - 2:09
6. "Solamente Una Vez (You Belong to My Heart)" (Agustín Lara) - 2:47
7. "Las Chiapanecas (While There's Music, There's Romance)" (Alberto De Campo) - 2:35
8. "Vaya con Dios (May God Be With You)" - 2:32
9. "Adiós Mariquita Linda (Adios and Farewell)" - 2:53
10. "No Me Platiques" - 3:02
11. "Aquí Se Habla en Amor (Love Is Spoken Here)" - 2:01
12. "A Media Luz (When Lights Are Soft and Low)" - 2:10

== Personnel ==
- Nat King Cole - vocals
- Ralph Carmichael - arranger
