= Cachito (Nat King Cole song) =

Single by Nat King Cole

from the album Cole Español
- Language: Spanish
- Released: 1958
- Recorded: June 9, 1957
- Studio: Panart Studios, Havana; Capitol Studios, Los Angeles
- Genre: Canción
- Label: Capitol
- Songwriter(s): Consuelo Velázquez

"Cachito" is song composed by Mexican songwriter Consuelo Velázquez in 1957. It was popularized in a 1958 recording by Nat King Cole. Cole included the track as first track on the Capitol Records LP Cole Español. Capitol also released "Cachito" as a single in Spain and Latin America. In Colombia, it was popularized by Matilde Díaz.

== Composition ==
Consuelo Velázquez wrote the music and lyrics of the song in 1957. It was dedicated to her second son, Mariano Rivera Velázquez, whom she had with Mariano Rivera Conde, director of RCA Victor Mexico. Previously, she had dedicated the song "Chiqui" to her first son Sergio.

Despite the gentle nature of the lyrics ("Cachito mío", meaning "my little thing", in reference to Consuelo's baby), the song was banned from airplay in Spain by the Francoist regime, together with other canciones such as "Bésame Mucho", Velázquez's biggest hit.
