= Henry Cuesta =

American clarinetist (1931–2003)

Henry Falcon Cuesta, Sr.
- Born: December 23, 1931; McAllen, Texas, US
- Died: December 17, 2003 (aged 71); Sherman Oaks, California, US
- Resting place: Woodlawn Memorial Cemetery in Santa Monica, California
- Education: Del Mar College
- Occupation: Woodwind musician
- Spouse: Janette Cuesta
- Children: 3

Henry Falcon Cuesta, Sr. (December 23, 1931 – December 17, 2003), was an American woodwind musician who was a cast member of The Lawrence Welk Show. His primary instrument was the clarinet, but he also played saxophone. At an early age, Cuesta began studying classical violin and then switched to woodwinds. He proved himself gifted and was selected to play while he was still in high school with the Corpus Christi Symphony Orchestra in Corpus Christi, Texas.

== Biography ==
Before being drafted into the United States Army in 1952, he graduated from Del Mar College, a community college in Corpus Christi, at which he majored in music. In the Army Special Services, he was involved in entertaining troops in Europe and England, which included a "Tribute to Gershwin" concert with the Stuttgart Symphony Orchestra in Germany.

After his Army duty, Cuesta toured the United States and Canada and developed his own highly personal style. While living in Toronto, Cuesta and his group became popular for visiting musicians, including Benny Goodman on one occasion. He later toured in the working band of the legendary trombonist, Jack Teagarden. Bobby Hackett advised him to get in touch with Lawrence Welk, and after listening to his recordings, Welk hired him immediately.

Cuesta made countless personal appearances performing and conducting in jazz festivals, state and county fairs, conventions, supper clubs, and symphony pops concerts. He appeared as a soloist with Jack Teagarden, Bob Crosby, Mel Tormé, in a Bobby Vinton television special, on The Tonight Show Starring Johnny Carson, and ten years on The Lawrence Welk Show. He also made several appearances to the Colorado Springs Invitational Jazz Party in Colorado Springs, Colorado, and performed with numerous international jazz musicians.

== Personal life and death ==
Cuesta died the age of seventy-one at his home in Sherman Oaks, California, after a bout with cancer just six days before his 72nd birthday.

His only son, Henry, Jr., was shot and killed in a robbery at the age of seventeen while he was working in 1987 at a movie theater on Wilshire Boulevard in Santa Monica, California.

== Discography ==
With Jack Teagarden

- Mis'ry and the Blues (Verve, 1961)
