= Stan Puls =

American double-bassist (1916-1998)

Stan Puls (January 26, 1916 – April 20, 1998) was an American double-bassist.

Puls started on piano at age 11 but switched to bass soon after. At the age of 19 he won a national competition; this allowed him to study with Vaclav Jiskra, who was then the first bassist of the Civic Orchestra of Chicago. Puls played in this orchestra from 1936 to 1941, while also working in jazz bands, including those of Roy Eldridge, Jack Teagarden and Benny Carter.

He moved to Los Angeles in 1941, where he played with Benny Strong and Spade Cooley as well as being part of the Burbank Symphony Orchestra. In the 1950s he played with Bill Baker and Jack Teagarden; his tenure with Teagarden lasted from 1958 to 1963 and includes many of Teagarden's recordings on Capitol Records and all his releases on Roulette Records. Puls freelanced after leaving Teagarden, and died at age 82 in 1998.

== Discography ==
With Jack Teagarden

- Mis'ry and the Blues (Verve, 1961)
- A Tribute to Jack Teagarden

With Jimmy Wakely

- Tribute to the Music of Bob Wills and the Texas Playboys

Others

- When the Saints Go Marching In
