= Get Out and Get Under the Moon =

"Get Out And Get Under The Moon" is a popular song.

The music was written by Larry Shay, the lyrics by Charles Tobias and William Jerome. The song was published in 1928.

Popular recordings of the song in 1928 were by Helen Kane, by Van and Schenck and by Paul Whiteman (with a vocal group including Bing Crosby).

== Other recordings ==
The song is now a standard, and has been recorded by many artists over the years, including:

- Doris Day for her album Cuttin' Capers (1959)
- Nat King Cole for his album Those Lazy-Hazy-Crazy Days of Summer (1963)
- Michael Feinstein for his album The Michael Feinstein Anthology (2002)

== Popular culture ==
- "Get Out and Get Under the Moon" was used in commercials for the American Apollo Program in 1968.
