= Jabbo Smith =

American jazz trumpeter (1908–1991)

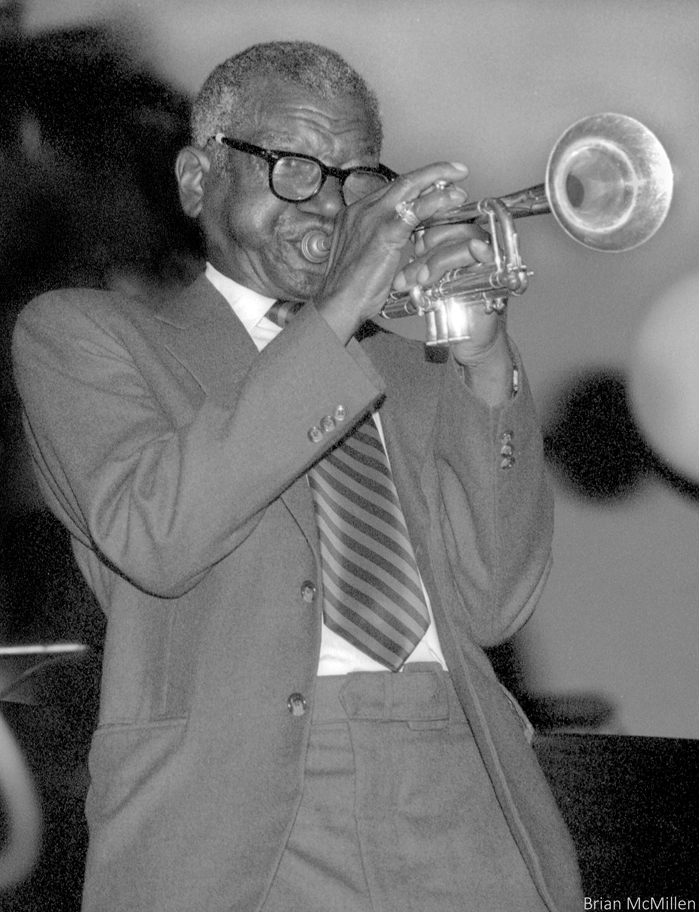
- Cladys "Jabbo" Smith at Turk Murphy's Earthquake McGoon's, San Francisco CA, 1981

Background information
- Born: Cladys Smith; December 24, 1908; Pembroke, Georgia, United States
- Died: January 16, 1991 (aged 82)
- Genres: Jazz
- Occupation: Musician
- Instrument: Trumpet

Jabbo Smith (born Cladys Smith; December 24, 1908 – January 16, 1991) was an American jazz musician, known for his virtuoso playing on the trumpet.

== Biography ==
Smith was born in Pembroke, Georgia, United States. At the age of six he went into the Jenkins Orphanage in Charleston, South Carolina where he learned trumpet and trombone, and by the age of 10 was touring with the Jenkins Band. At the age of 16 he had left the Orphanage to become a professional musician, at first playing in bands in Philadelphia, Pennsylvania, and Atlantic City, New Jersey, before making his base in Manhattan, New York City, from about 1925 through 1928, where he made the first of his well regarded recordings.

From February to May 1928, Smith was featured in the band along with Fats Waller and James P. Johnson in the Waller/Andy Razaf Broadway musical and dance revue Keep Shufflin' which ran for 104 performances.

Later on in 1928 he toured with James P. Johnson's Orchestra, when their show broke up in Chicago, Illinois, where Smith stayed for a few years. His series of 20 recordings for Brunswick Records in 1929 are his most famous (19 were issued), and Smith was billed as a rival to Louis Armstrong. Most of these records did not sell well enough for Brunswick to extend his contract.

In March 1935, in Chicago, Smith was featured in a recording session produced by Helen Oakley under the name of Charles LaVere & His Chicagoans, which included a vocal by both Smith and LaVere on LaVere's composition and arrangement of "Boogaboo Blues". It is an early example of inter-racial blues recordings, although far from the first as such had been made at least since about 1921.

In the 1930s, Smith moved to Milwaukee, Wisconsin, which would be his main base for many years, alternating with returns to New York. In Milwaukee he collaborated with saxophonist Bill Johnson. Subsequently, Smith dropped out of the public eye, playing music part-time in Milwaukee with a regular job at an automobile hire company.

Smith made a comeback starting in the late 1960s, successfully playing with bands and shows in New York, New Orleans, Louisiana, London, and France through the 1970s and into the 1980s. He was one of the musicians in the musical One Mo’ Time about an African-American vaudeville in the 1920s. A recording with the original cast including Jabbo Smith was produced (Warner Bros Records WB 56850).

Concerts in France, Italy, Switzerland and Netherlands took place with Smith and the Hot Antic Jazz Band. They were recorded in concert in 1982, and the live album, Jabbo Smith and the Hot Antic Jazz Band: European Concerts, was released.

In January 1991, Jabbo Smith died in New York City, at the age of 82.
