= Hal Grayson =

Harold Wesley (Hal) Grayson (May 31, 1908–October 30, 1959) was an American band leader from the big band era.

== Career ==
Grayson, known as The Melody Master, started Hal Grayson's Band in 1932, and played a number of popular venues, such as the Blossom Room of the Hollywood Roosevelt Hotel, the Santa Catalina Casino. the St. Francis Hotel in San Francisco, and the Waldorf-Astoria in New York.

Grayson and his band appeared in several Warner Brothers movies.

Among others, Stan Kenton played with Grayson's band, and Betty Grable, Martha Tilton, and Shirley Ross sang.

Grayson's band disbanded in the late 1940s.

== Personal ==
Grayson was born in Los Angeles on May 31, 1980. He graduated from Los Angeles High School, and attended the University of Southern California. "In 1938 he married Phyllis McMullen in Salt Lake City, but they were soon divorced. In 1940 Grayson married Frances Bowe Slaugh, the daughter of Harry H. Slaugh, vice president of the Santa Catalina Island Co." The couple were divorced in 1943 in Las Vegas. Grayson died on October 30, 1959 in the Wilcox Hotel in Los Angeles. His body was discovered by a maintenance man

"Grayson had a long record of arrests for drunkenness. In 1953 he was committed to a state hospital as an alcoholic." He was frequently arrested for drunkenness from the 1940s, and at one point had sunk to washing cars for a living. In 1948 he was sentenced to 255 days in jail for drunkenness.
