= Martha Tilton =

American singer (1915–2006)

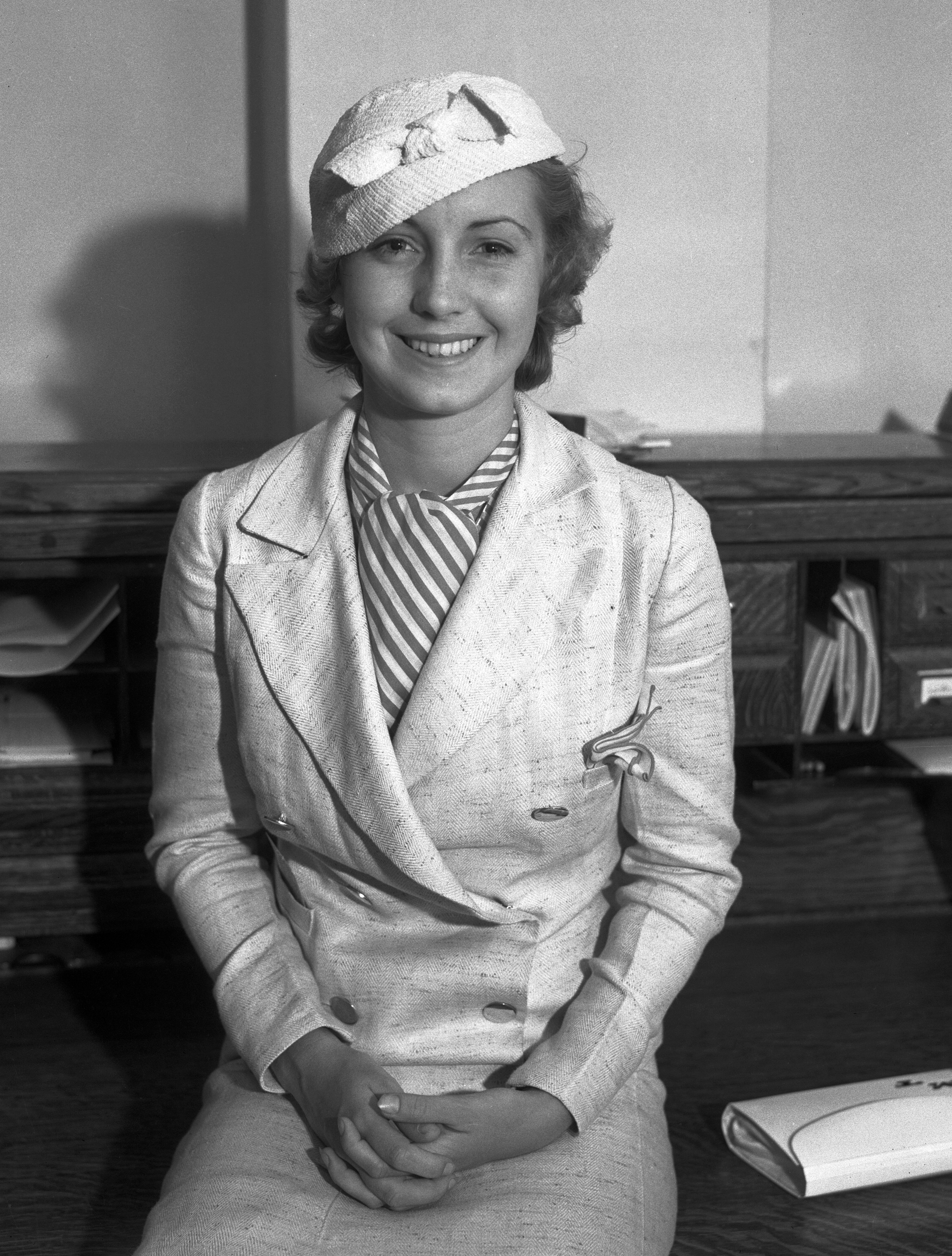
- Tilton in 1933

Background information
- Also known as: The Liltin' Miss Tilton
- Born: Martha Ellen Tilton; November 14, 1915; Corpus Christi, Texas, U.S.
- Died: December 8, 2006 (aged 91) Brentwood, Los Angeles, California, U.S.
- Genres: Swing; Jazz; Traditional pop
- Occupations: Singer, actress
- Years active: 1930s–1990s
- Labels: Capitol, Coral, Tops
- Formerly of: Three Hits and a Miss
- Website: marthatilton.com

Martha Tilton (November 14, 1915 – December 8, 2006) was an American popular singer during America's swing era and traditional pop period. She is best known for her 1939 recording of "And the Angels Sing" with Benny Goodman.

Tilton was born in Corpus Christi, Texas, United States. Her family moved to Edna, Kansas, when she was three months old. They relocated to Los Angeles when she was seven years old. While attending Fairfax High School in Los Angeles, she was singing on a small radio station when she was heard by an agent who signed her and began booking her with larger stations.

She then dropped out of school in the eleventh grade to join Hal Grayson's band. After singing with the quartet Three Hits and a Miss, she joined the Myer Alexander Chorus on Benny Goodman's radio show, Camel Caravan. Goodman hired Tilton as a vocalist with his band in August 1937. She was with Goodman in January 1938, when the band performed at Carnegie Hall. She continued to appear as Goodman's star vocalist until the end of 1939. She had a No. 1 hit with Benny Goodman's recording of "And the Angels Sing" in 1939.

== Recordings ==
Tilton had a major success from 1942 to 1949 as one of the first artists to record for Capitol Records. Her first recording for Capitol was "Moon Dreams", Capitol 138, with Orchestra and The Mellowaires, composed by Johnny Mercer and Glenn Miller pianist Chummy MacGregor in 1942. "Moon Dreams" would be recorded by Glenn Miller in 1944 and by Miles Davis in 1950.

Among her biggest hits as a solo artist were "I'll Walk Alone", a wartime ballad which rose to No. 4 on the charts in 1944; "I Should Care" and "A Stranger in Town," which both peaked at No. 10 in 1945; and three in 1947: "How Are Things in Glocca Morra" from Finian's Rainbow, which climbed to No. 8; "That's My Desire", which hit No. 10; and "I Wonder, I Wonder, I Wonder", which reached No. 9. After she left Capitol, Tilton recorded for other labels, including Coral and Tops. Among her later albums was We Sing the Old Songs (1957, Tops), a mix of older songs and recent standards, recorded with baritone Curt Massey.

Reviewing the two-CD set, The Liltin' Miss Tilton, (Capitol, 2000), critic Don Heckman wrote:

There are those who would say that Martha Tilton wasn't a jazz singer at all. But swing-era fans won't have any doubts, remembering her for a rocking version of "Loch Lomond" at Benny Goodman's 1938 Carnegie Hall concert.

== Radio ==
In 1941, Tilton sang on Fibber McGee and Molly and starred on Campana Serenade, a program of popular music on first NBC and then CBS in 1942–1944. (Tilton sang on the later CBS version, with the Lud Gluskin Orchestra.) A contemporary newspaper article called Tilton's role on Fibber McGee and Molly "a milestone in her personal history ... Martha's biggest transcontinental [broadcast] since her days as soloist with Benny Goodman."

In the early 1940s, she also sang on Ransom Sherman's program on CBS. Massey and Tilton starred in Alka-Seltzer Time, a 15-minute radio series broadcast weekdays on both CBS and Mutual. Sponsored by Alka-Seltzer, this show began in 1949 as Curt Massey Time (sometimes advertised as Curt Massey Time with Martha Tilton) with a title change to highlight the sponsor's product by 1952. Prior to that, Tilton had co-starred on The Jack Smith Show, another 15-minute radio musical program.

By 1953, the series was heard simultaneously on Mutual (at noon) and later that same day on CBS (at 5:45pm). Ads described the show as "informal song sessions" by vocalists Massey and Tilton, who was often billed as "The liltin' Martha Tilton". The two Texan singers performed with Country Washburne and His Orchestra, featuring Charles LaVere on piano. The series ended November 6, 1953. However, Massey and Tilton continued to appear together during the late 1950s on such shows as Guest Star and Stars for Defense.

== Films ==
Her movies include Sunny (1941), Strictly in the Groove (1942), Swing Hostess (1944), Crime, Inc. (1945), and The Benny Goodman Story (1956). Her last film appearance was as the band vocalist in the TV movie Queen of the Stardust Ballroom (1975). Tilton's singing voice was used for other actresses including Barbara Stanwyck, Martha O'Driscoll, and Anne Gwynne.

She appeared in several Soundies musical films of the 1940s.

== Television ==
Tilton once again worked with Massey in the late 1950s and early 1960s—this time on KRCA-TV in Los Angeles. They were reunited on that station's Curt Massey Show. In 1960, Tilton won a Southland Emmy Award as outstanding female personality for her work on KRCA. In 1961, Tilton repeated as outstanding female personality, and the program won the Most Outstanding Musical or Variety Show award. Tilton also appeared as a guest star on The Jack Benny Program, on February 26, 1963 (Season 13, Episode 21) where they reminisce about their work entertaining soldiers for the USO.

== Personal life ==
Tilton's first marriage she eloped with a young Canadian musician named Dave Thomas when she was 18 years old and gave birth to their son, Gerald, in 1936. Tilton later married Benny Goodman's manager Leonard Vannerson, and they had two sons. She married James Brooks, a test pilot, in 1948. They had a daughter.

Tilton was a Republican.

On December 8, 2006, Tilton died of natural causes at her Brentwood home.

== Singles ==
=== With Benny Goodman ===
Year	Single	US Chart
1937	"Bob White"	15
1937	"Can't Teach My Old Heart New Tricks"	14
1937	"Loch Lomond"	12
1938	"You Took the Words Right Out of My Heart"	9
1938	"Bei Mir Bist Du Schoen"	4
1938	"'S Wonderful"	7
1938	"Please Be Kind"	14
1938	"I Let a Song Go Out of My Heart"	1
1938	"Feelin' High and Happy"	11
1938	"Why'd Ya Make Me Fall in Love?"	12
1938	"The Flat Foot Floogee"	7
1938	"(I've Been) Savin' Myself for You"	12
1938	"What Goes On Here in My Heart"	3
1938	"A Little Kiss at Twilight"	7
1938	"I've Got a Date with a Dream"	4
1938	"Could You Pass in Love?"	20
1938	"When I Go A-Dreamin'"	11
1938	"Is That the Way to Treat a Sweetheart?"	15
1938	"What Have You Got That Gets Me?"	6
1938	"This Can't Be Love"	2
1938	"I Have Eyes"	6
1938	"You're a Sweet Little Headache"	6
1938	"I Must See Annie Tonight"	13
1939	"And the Angels Sing"	1

With Benny Goodman

- The Complete RCA Victor Small Group Recordings (RCA Victor, 1935–39 [1997])

=== Solo ===
Year	Single	US Chart
1944	"I'll Walk Alone"	4
1944	"Texas Polka"	24
1945	"Stranger in Town"	10
1945	"I Should Care"	10
1947	"How Are Things in Glocca Morra?"	8
1947	"I Wonder, I Wonder, I Wonder"	9
1947	"That's My Desire"	10
1948	"That's Gratitude"	22
1950	"I'll Always Love You"	23
