= Hans Carste =

German composer and conductor

Hans Friedrich August Carste (5 September 1909 in Frankenthal – 11 May 1971 in Bad Wiessee) was a German composer and conductor. He arrived in Berlin in 1931 after working in Vienna and Breslau. He composed film music and as well as songs for the stage. Electrola offered him and his orchestra an exclusive recording contract and he recorded many high quality sides for them. Hans Carste joined the NSDAP in 1933.

In 1937, when Ludwig Rüth, the Jewish band leader, emigrated to South Africa, Hans Carste took up the baton. For some time the orchestra was still known as the Ludwig (Lewis) Rüth Orchester but acknowledged that Carste was the conductor. Within a short time it became known as the Hans Carste Orchester.

In 1942, Carste was drafted and sent to the Eastern Front. He was badly injured and captured by the Red Army. Released in 1948, he returned to Germany, becoming one of the musical directors at Rundfunk im amerikanischen Sektor (RIAS) radio station in Berlin, and once again working for the stage and movies. In 1957, he became president of the Bureau International de l'Edition Mecanique (BIEM) in Paris. He withdrew from all activities in 1967 due to illness.

One of his best-known compositions is the opening tune of the "Tagesschau" - the TV news broadcast. He also composed the music for the song "Du spielst 'ne tolle Rolle", which was recorded by the Andrews Sisters and Nat King Cole, with English lyrics by Charles Tobias, as "Those Lazy-Hazy-Crazy Days of Summer".

== Musical works ==
- Polonaise Aus "Eugen Onegin"/Pomp and Circumstance (1962)
- Zwischen Tag Und Traum Folge 1 bis Folge 5
- Walzer-Synkopen (1956)
- Liedertexte aus der Operette Lump mit Herz (1952)
- Lüg' nicht, Baby! (1932)

== Audio recordings of songs ==
1956– John Serry Sr. recorded Carste's song Hawaiian Night on accordion with his ensemble for Dot Records (See Squeeze Play (album)).
