= All Alone (Frank Sinatra album) =

Studio album by Frank Sinatra
- Released: October 1962
- Recorded: January 15–17, 1962 (Los Angeles)
- Genre: Vocal jazz; traditional pop
- Length: 37:28
- Label: Reprise; FS 1007

Frank Sinatra chronology
| Sinatra Sings of Love and Things (1962) | All Alone (1962) | Sinatra Sings Great Songs from Great Britain (1962) |

All Alone is the twenty-seventh studio album by American singer Frank Sinatra, released in October 1962.

Originally, All Alone was going to be titled Come Waltz with Me. Although the title and the accompanying specially written title song were dropped before the album's release, the album remained a stately collection of waltzes, arranged and conducted by Gordon Jenkins. The original title track is included as a bonus track on the 1992 compact disc release of the album. This was the first studio album from Sinatra not to make the U.S. Top Twenty since 1950.

All of the tracks on the album are torch songs, hence the lonely name of the album. Five of the tracks were written by Irving Berlin.

The cover is a trimmed portion of a painting that hung in Sinatra's Palm Springs home.

Professional ratings
Review scores
| Source | Rating |
|---|---|
| Allmusic | 2.5/5 stars |
| Encyclopedia of Popular Music | 5/5 stars |
| New Record Mirror | 4/5 stars |

== Track listing ==
Side 1:

1. "All Alone" (Irving Berlin) – 2:42
2. "The Girl Next Door" (Hugh Martin, Ralph Blane) – 3:18
3. "Are You Lonesome Tonight?" (Roy Turk, Lou Handman) – 3:31
4. "Charmaine" (Erno Rapee, Lew Pollack) – 3:17
5. "What'll I Do" (Berlin) – 3:15
6. "When I Lost You" (Berlin) – 3:43

Side 2:

1. "Oh, How I Miss You Tonight" (Benny Davis, Joe Burke, Mark Fisher) – 3:21
2. "Indiscreet" (Sammy Cahn, Jimmy Van Heusen) – 3:52
3. "Remember" (Berlin) – 3:23
4. "Together" (B.G. DeSylva, Lew Brown, Ray Henderson, Stephen Ballantine) – 3:21
5. "The Song is Ended (But The Melody Lingers On)" (Berlin) – 3:25

CD reissue bonus tracks not included on the original 1962 release:

1. "Come Waltz With Me" (Cahn, Van Heusen) – 2:53

== Personnel ==
- Frank Sinatra - vocals
- Gordon Jenkins - arranger, conductor
