= The Letter (Judy Garland album) =

Studio album by Judy Garland
- Released: May 4, 1959
- Recorded: January 15–16, 1959
- Length: 57:14
- Label: Capitol

Judy Garland chronology
Garland at the Grove (1959)	The Letter (1959)	That's Entertainment! (1960)

Singles from The Letter
- 1. "The Red Balloon" Released: 1959; 2. "The Worst Kind of Man" Released: 1959; 3. "Beautiful Trouble" Released: 1959; 4. "That's All There Is (There Isn't Any More)" Released: 1959

The Letter is a studio album by Judy Garland released on May 4, 1959, by Capitol Records. Conceived as a concept album, it was arranged by Gordon Jenkins and presents a narrative of a troubled romance through spoken passages and musical performances.

Upon its release, the album received generally favorable reviews.

== Album details and release ==
The album is a concept album, with Jenkins unfolding a story about a man attempting to rekindle a broken romance. The actor John Ireland provides spoken narration through a letter, while Garland expresses the emotions through her musical performance. The Ralph Brewster Singers and soloists contribute effectively to the atmosphere.

In 1963, after a series of commercial successes with some of Garland's records (such as Judy at Carnegie Hall, 1961), the album was re-released under the title Our Love Letter.

The album was re-released in compact disc format in 2007 through DRG Records. The CD tracks were digitally remixed and remastered in 24-bit, directly from the original multi-track stereo session tapes, by David McEowen at Capitol Mastering in Hollywood and was produced by Scott Schechter. The CD features four bonus tracks, rare single versions of songs meant for radio play in 1959, and a booklet that includes rare artwork and detailed liner notes by Schechter.

== Critical reception ==
Professional ratings
Review scores
Source	Rating
AllMusic	3/5 stars

Billboard compared the album to Jenkins' Manhattan Towers (1956) and praised it as "a moving set enhanced by wonderful sound and attractive packaging". Cash Box noted that the album "displays Judy Garland at her best", adding that "the singer stirs up lots of memories and excitement with a bill of melodies that brought her to stardom" and "will also stir up lots of sales with this delectable deck".

In a retrospective review, John Bush of AllMusic described The Letter as "a fair concept album, its interruptions annoying but its overall power raised by the twin talents of Judy Garland and Gordon Jenkins".

== Track listing ==
All tracks are written by Gordon Jenkins.

The Letter
No.	Title	Length
1.	"Beautiful Trouble"	4:18
2.	"Love in the Village"	4:32
3.	"Charley's Blues"	3:27
4.	"The Worst Kind of Man"	3:58
5.	"That's All There Is, There Isn't Any More"	2:50
6.	"Love in Central Park"	4:34
7.	"The Red Balloon"	2:24
8.	"The Fight"	3:34
9.	"At the Stroke of Midnight"	4:30
10.	"Come Back"	4:36
11.	"Beautiful Trouble" (Single Version)	1:48
12.	"That's All There Is, There Isn't Any More" (Single Version)	2:26
13.	"The Worst Kind of Man" (Single Version)	2:19
14.	"The Red Balloon" (Single Version)	2:03

== Personnel ==
- Judy Garland – vocals
- John Ireland
- Gordon Jenkins – arranger
- Charles LaVere – vocals on "Charley's Blues"
