= Love Is the Thing =

Studio album by Nat King Cole
- Released: April 1957
- Recorded: December 19, 28, 1956
- Studio: Capitol (Hollywood)
- Genre: Jazz
- Length: 36:14 (12-track original album); 30:38 (10 track version); 45:43 (reissue with bonus tracks)
- Label: Capitol
- Producer: Lee Gillette

Nat King Cole chronology
Just One of Those Things (1957)	Love Is the Thing (1957)	Cole Español (1958)

Professional ratings
Review scores
Source	Rating
Allmusic	4.5/5 stars
The Rolling Stone Jazz Record Guide	4/5 stars

Love Is the Thing is a 1957 album released by American jazz vocalist Nat King Cole. It is the first of four collaborations between Cole and influential arranger Gordon Jenkins.

Launching the charting single "Stardust", which peaked at #79, the album reached #1 on Billboard's "Pop Albums" chart and tied at #1 on the UK Charts with the soundtrack for the 1956 film The King and I. According to the records of the RIAA, the album achieved gold status in 1960 and broke platinum in 1992. The LP was Cole's first gold album.

== Overview ==
In 1956, Cole came together with popular music arranger Jenkins to produce the first of the four collaborations that are described by critics as among the best of either artist. American Jazz commenter Scott Yanow noted that the album "sticks exclusively" to the role Cole had established in 1950s popular opinion as a "superb ballad vocalist". While Love Is the Thing little reflects the jazz roots whence Cole emerged, the singer's "restrained vocal approach" and the arranger's "unhurried string charts" combined to produce a romantic album of enduring popularity.

Cole's three further albums with Jenkins were The Very Thought of You (1958), Every Time I Feel the Spirit (1959), and Where Did Everyone Go? (1963).

== Release history ==
Originally released by Capitol Records, the album has been re-issued by various companies in alternate forms.

A 1996 re-release on 24-kt gold foil by the Digital Compact Classics label included three bonus tracks, the same tracks incorporated in the re-titled 1991 CD Love Is the Thing (And More). In 2007, The Collectors' Choice label reissued the album in conjunction with the final Cole/Jenkins collaboration on a single disc entitled Love Is the Thing/Where Did Everyone Go? In 2010 the audiophile Analogue Productions label issued a hybrid SACD of the album, containing its original 12 tracks in mono, stereo, and three-track multichannel sound.

The original mono edition of the LP (Capitol W 824) contained two tracks not found on the original stereo edition (Capitol SW 824), those being "Maybe It's Because I Love You Too Much" and "Love Letters," neither of which have appeared in stereo on any reissue.

== Track listing ==
1. "When I Fall in Love" (Edward Heyman, Victor Young) – 3:10
2. "Stardust" (Hoagy Carmichael, Mitchell Parish) – 3:15
3. "Stay as Sweet as You Are" (Mack Gordon, Harry Revel) – 2:59
4. "Where Can I Go Without You?" (Peggy Lee, Young) – 2:57
5. "Maybe It's Because I Love You Too Much" (Irving Berlin) – 2:50
6. "Love Letters" (Heyman, Young) – 2:46
7. "Ain't Misbehavin'" (Harry Brooks, Andy Razaf, Fats Waller) – 3:17
8. "I Thought About Marie" (Gordon Jenkins) – 3:06
9. "At Last" (Gordon, Harry Warren) – 3:00
10. "It's All in the Game" (Charles G. Dawes, Carl Sigman) – 3:07
11. "When Sunny Gets Blue" (Marvin Fisher, Jack Segal) – 2:46
12. "Love Is the Thing" (Ned Washington, Young) – 3:01

== Bonus Tracks ==
13. "Someone to Tell It To" (Sammy Cahn, Dolores Fuller, Jimmy Van Heusen) – 3:17
14. "The End of a Love Affair" (Edward Redding) – 3:11
15. "If Love Ain't There" (Johnny Burke) – 3:01

== Personnel ==
- Nat King Cole – vocals
- Lee Gillette – producer
- Gordon Jenkins – arranger, conductor
- Charlie LaVere – piano
- John Kraus – engineer

== Chart positions ==
Chart (1957)	Peak position
UK Albums Chart	1

== Certifications ==
Certifications and sales for Love Is the Thing
Region	Certification	Certified units/sales
United States (RIAA)	Platinum	1,000,000^{^}
^{^} Shipments figures based on certification alone.
