= Nat King Cole Sings My Fair Lady =

Studio album by Nat King Cole
- Released: August 1964
- Recorded: September 17–20, 1963 at Broadwood Hotel, Philadelphia, Pennsylvania
- Genre: Easy listening
- Length: 36:19
- Label: Capitol Records
- Producer: Lee Gillette

Nat King Cole chronology
I Don't Want to Be Hurt Anymore (1964)	Nat King Cole Sings My Fair Lady (1964)	L-O-V-E (1965)

Nat King Cole Sings My Fair Lady is an album by Nat King Cole released by Capitol Records in mid 1964 of songs from the 1956 musical My Fair Lady, right before the highly successful film version of the musical was released in late 1964. The album was recorded in Philadelphia with members of The Philadelphia Orchestra. The cover art shows Cole in Philadelphia's Elfreth's Alley, standing in for the musical's London Covent Garden setting.

== Reception ==
Professional ratings
Review scores
Source	Rating
AllMusic	3/5 stars
The Rolling Stone Jazz Record Guide	1/5 stars
The Encyclopedia of Popular Music	3/5 stars

=== Contemporary ===
Cashbox in its "Pop Picks" reviews called it a "top-drawer package of selections." They added: "While backed by lush Ralph Carmichael-conducted orchestra, the chanter turns in splendid readings of 'I Could Have Danced All Night,' 'Wouldn't It Be Loverly,' and 'The Rain in Spain,'" concluding that the "Disk should score heavily."

=== Retrospective ===
Scott Yanow of AllMusic wrote in the review stated that "[Cole's] clearly enjoyed this project, which is really of greater interest to fans of the show than to Cole's earlier jazz followers. The Encyclopedia of Popular Music gave the album a three-star rating, which meant they thought the album was "good".

== Chart performance ==
The album debuted on the Billboard Top LPs chart in the issue dated September 26, 1964, and remained on the chart for 23 weeks, peaking at number 74. It entered the Cashbox albums chart in the issue dated September 26, 1964, and remained on the chart for six weeks, peaking at number 75.

== Track listing ==
1. "With a Little Bit of Luck" – 2:52
2. "I Could Have Danced All Night" – 2:30
3. "The Rain in Spain" – 3:26
4. "On the Street Where You Live" – 3:12
5. "I'm an Ordinary Man" – 5:14
6. "Get Me to the Church on Time" – 2:30
7. "Show Me" – 3:37
8. "I've Grown Accustomed to Her Face" – 2:48
9. "You Did It" – 4:09
10. "Wouldn't It Be Loverly" – 2:51
11. "A Hymn to Him" – 3:10

All music by Frederick Loewe, and all lyrics by Alan Jay Lerner.

== Personnel ==
- Nat King Cole – vocal
- Ralph Carmichael – arranger, conductor
- Lee Gillette – producer
