= I Don't Want to Be Hurt Anymore =

Studio album by Nat King Cole
- Released: 1964
- Recorded: January 14–May 5, 27, 1964
- Studio: Capitol (Hollywood)
- Genre: Vocal jazz
- Length: 29:54
- Label: Capitol
- Producer: Lee Gillette

Nat King Cole chronology
Let's Face the Music! (1964)	I Don't Want to Be Hurt Anymore (1964)	Nat King Cole Sings My Fair Lady (1964)

I Don't Want to Be Hurt Anymore is a 1964 studio album by Nat King Cole, arranged by Ralph Carmichael. The album reached No. 18 on the Billboard Top LP's chart. "I Don't Want to Be Hurt Anymore" b/w "People" was released as a single on Capitol 5155 in 1964, charting on the Billboard Hot 100 at Nos. 22 and 100, respectively. "I Don't Want to See Tomorrow" b/w "L-O-V-E", released as a single on Capitol 5261, peaked at Nos. 34 and 81, respectively, on the Hot 100 in August 1964.

== Reception ==
Professional ratings
Review scores
Source	Rating
AllMusic	3/5 stars
Billboard	(favorable)
The Encyclopedia of Popular Music	3/5 stars

The AllMusic review by William Ruhlmann said the album "suffered from a lack of strong material and arrangements...with the sad sentiments undercut by relatively quick tempos and a perky backup chorus"

== Track listing ==
1. "I Don't Want to Be Hurt Anymore" - 2:29
2. "You're Crying On My Shoulder" (Sidney Lippman, Fred Wise) - 2:22
3. "Only Yesterday" (Hoagy Carmichael, Bretha Scott) - 2:59
4. "I'm Alone Because I Love You" (Ned Miller, Ira Schuster, Al Young) - 1:37
5. "Don't You Remember" - 1:57
6. "You're My Everything" (Mort Dixon, Harry Warren, Joe Young) - 2:49
7. "I Don't Want to See Tomorrow" (Lenwood Morris, Bernie Wayne) - 2:36
8. "Brush Those Tears From Your Eyes" (Oakley Haddleman, C. Watts) - 2:46
9. "Was That the Human Thing to Do" (Sammy Fain, Joe Young) - 2:46
10. "Go If You're Going" (James P. Johnson) - 2:25
11. "Road to Nowhere" (Robert Ecton) - 3:07
12. "All Cried Out" - 2:01

== Personnel ==
- Nat King Cole – vocals
- Ralph Carmichael – arranger
