= Where Did Everyone Go? =

Studio album by Nat King Cole
- Released: May 1963
- Recorded: August 13–14, 1962
- Studio: Capitol (Hollywood)
- Genre: Vocal jazz
- Length: 38:03
- Label: Capitol
- Producer: Lee Gillette

Nat King Cole chronology
Those Lazy-Hazy-Crazy Days of Summer (1963)	Where Did Everyone Go? (1963)	Nat King Cole Sings My Fair Lady (1964)

Professional ratings
Review scores
Source	Rating
Allmusic	(not rated)
New Record Mirror	3/5 stars
The Encyclopedia of Popular Music	3/5 stars

Where Did Everyone Go? is a 1963 studio album by Nat King Cole, arranged by Gordon Jenkins. This was the fourth and final album that Cole and Jenkins recorded together, following Love Is the Thing (1957), The Very Thought of You (1958) and Every Time I Feel the Spirit (1959).

The album debuted on the Billboard Top LPs chart in the issue dated May 25, 1963, and remained on the chart for six weeks, peaking at number 68. It debuted on the Cashbox albums chart in the issue dated April 27, 1963, and remained on the chart for 15 weeks, peaking at number 75.

== Reception ==
The initial Billboard review from April 13, 1963, commented that "Here he is in a superb collection of ballad tunes, many of them in a lonesome, blue mood, with standout backing provided by Gordon Jenkins...Great mood wax for buyers and spinners".

The Allmusic review of Where Did Everyone Go? by Lindsay Planer said "there is a perceptible poignancy and longing weaved throughout Jenkins' arrangements. The opener "Where Did Everyone Go?" possesses a solitude accentuated by responsive instrumentation that supports, yet never intrudes. Cole's practically conversational delivery of pop standards...become musical soliloquies with the score as a sonic subtext."

== Track listing ==
1. "Where Did Everyone Go?" (Mack David, Jimmy Van Heusen) – 4:35
2. "Say It Isn't So" (Irving Berlin) – 3:06
3. "If Love Ain't There" (Johnny Burke) – 3:10
4. "(Ah, the Apple Trees) When the World Was Young" (M. Philippe Gerard, Angela Vannier, Johnny Mercer) – 4:01
5. "Am I Blue" (Harry Akst, Grant Clarke) – 3:01
6. "Someone to Tell It To" (Sammy Cahn, Dolores Fuller, Van Heusen) – 3:16
7. "The End of a Love Affair" (Edward Redding) – 3:10
8. "I Keep Going Back to Joe's" (Marvin Fisher, Jack Segal) – 2:38
9. "Laughing on the Outside (Crying on the Inside)" (Ben Raleigh, Bernie Wayne) – 2:47
10. "No, I Don't Want Her" (Joe Bailey) – 3:03
11. "Spring Is Here" (Lorenz Hart, Richard Rodgers) – 2:34
12. "That's All There Is (There Isn't Anymore)" (Gordon Jenkins) – 2:42

== Personnel ==
- Nat King Cole – vocal
- Gordon Jenkins – arranger, conductor
