= Consuelo Velázquez =

Mexican concert pianist and composer

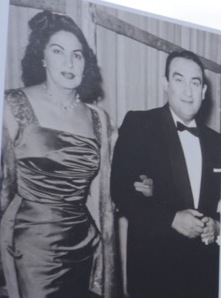
Velázquez with Pedro Vargas, c. 1950s

Consuelo Velázquez Torres (August 21, 1916 – January 22, 2005), also popularly known as Consuelito Velázquez, was a Mexican concert pianist and composer. She was the composer of famous Mexican ballads such as "Bésame mucho", "Amar y vivir", and "Cachito".

== Early years ==
Born in Ciudad Guzmán, Jalisco, she was the youngest of five daughters. Her father was an army officer and poet who died when she was young. At four years old she started to demonstrate a good ear and an aptitude for music, and at barely six years old she began studying music and piano at the Academia de Música Serratos in Guadalajara. After several years of study, when she was 11, she moved to Mexico City, where she continued her studies and obtained a degree in teaching music and concert piano at the National Conservatory of Music. Her first public concert was held in the Palacio de Bellas Artes in the capital, and soon after she began working as a composer of popular music. As a concert pianist, she was a soloist of Mexico's National Symphony Orchestra and of the Philharmonic Orchestra of the National Autonomous University of Mexico.

As performing on the radio for a young woman of a wealthy family was risky, she used a male pseudonym in her first years. Mariano Rivera Conde, who was the artistic director of the station, pushed her to admit she was the author of the songs. Velázquez married him six years later.

== Career ==
As a composer her legacy has been more well known. Her first compositions, "No me pidas nunca", "Pasional" and "Déjame quererte", were from the genre "naturaleza romántica", which emphasizes nature's beauty and strength. Later, songs like "Bésame mucho", "Amar y vivir", "Verdad Amarga", "Franqueza", "Chiqui", "Cachito", "Que seas feliz", "Enamorada", "Orgullosa y bonita" and "Yo no fui" (a danceable song initially popularized by Pedro Infante and, in recent years, by Pedro Fernández) emerged among others. Velázquez's work as an actress in the 1938 Argentinian movie Noches de Carnaval directed by filmmaker Julio Saraceni was unique for her career. As a pianist she was also involved in the Mexican movies directed by Julián Soler Se le pasó la mano made in 1952 and Mis padres se divorcian made in 1959. Additionally, she appeared in the documentary about her life, Consuelo Velázquez, made in 1992. Throughout her life she composed music for several Mexican movies.

Between 1979 and 1982 she was a part of the Chamber of Deputies of the Congress of Mexico.

=== Bésame mucho ===
Her best-known piece is the iconic song "Bésame mucho", which she composed in the Cuban music genre bolero in 1932 when she was 16 years old. This piece gained Velázquez the most recognition and brought the most pleasure to her, and was created before Consuelo received her first kiss from someone she loved. After its recording by the Spanish-Mexican baritone Emilio Tuero, the famous American pianist and singer Nat "King" Cole made the first adaptation of the song in English in 1944. From then on, it was interpreted and performed by hundreds of artists around the world, such as Pedro Infante, Javier Solís, The Beatles, Plácido Domingo, Frank Sinatra, Sammy Davis Jr., Luis Mariano (who popularized it France), Dalida, Sonora Santanera, Xavier Cugat and his Orchestra, The Ventures, Antonio Machín, Lucho Gatica, Vera Lynn, Andrea Bocelli, Filippa Giordano, Luis Miguel, Sara Montiel, José Carreras, Ray Conniff and his Orchestra, Diana Krall, Zoé, Susana Zabaleta and Mónica Naranjo among others. "Bésame mucho" is also known as "Kiss Me Kiss Me Much", "Kiss Me a Lot", "Kiss Me Again and Again", "Embrasse-Moi" and "Stále ma bozkávaj". Translated into more than 20 languages, the song has become an icon of popular music. Part of its great success in the United States was due to its appeal to women who waited for their husbands during World War II.

== Personal life ==
In 1944 Velázquez married the media owner and artist promoter Mariano Rivera Conde (died in 1977), and they had two sons.

=== Death ===
Velázquez died in Mexico City of respiratory problems on January 22, 2005, at the age of 88. Her body was moved to the Palacio de Bellas Artes, the stage of her first show, in tribute to the known artists of the town. Her ashes later were buried in the Santo Tomas Moro church, where she went every Sunday for mass. As her last artistic contribution, she performed piano in the most recent album of the Mexican singer Cecilia Toussaint titled Para mi... Consuelo, which contains songs by Velázquez.

== Awards and honors ==
In 1977 the concert pianist also received the Award of Peace of the United Nations, together with her colleague the teacher Ramon Inclan Aguilar and the journalist and singer Wilbert Alonzo Cabrera, Lola Beltrán and Maria Medina. This award was presented to them by the General Clerk of the UN due to this artistic participation and organization of a lavish Mexican festival for the "día del personal" of the United Nations, a day that celebrates the contributions of people in uniform and civilians to the work of the organization.

Velázquez was winner of the National Prize for Science and Arts in the field of Popular Art and Traditions in 1989.
