= Armando de Sequeira Romeu =

Cuban-American multi-instrumentalist, composer, arranger, and bandleader (1937–2023)

- Also known as: Armando Zequeira Romeu
- Born: Armando Antonio de Sequeira Romeu; 13 September 1937; Havana, Cuba
- Died: 29 January 2023 (aged 85) Miami, Florida, U.S.
- Genres: Cuban jazz, Latin jazz, popular music
- Occupations: Multi-instrumentalist, composer, arranger, bandleader
- Instruments: Upright bass, drums, piano, violin
- Years active: 1950s–2000s
- Labels: Areito (EGREM), Produfon/BASF

Armando Antonio de Sequeira Romeu (13 September 1937 – 29 January 2023) was a Cuban-American multi-instrumentalist, composer, arranger, and bandleader, and a member of the Romeu music family. Active across Cuba's jazz, pop, and cinematic scenes, he collaborated with Nat King Cole, Chucho Valdés, and Paquito D'Rivera, bridging classical tradition and modern Cuban jazz. His work extended to radio, television, and the ICAIC, making him a figure in Cuba's 20th-century cultural landscape.

== Early life and training ==
Armando Antonio de Sequeira Romeu was born on 13 September 1937 in Havana, Cuba into one of the island's musical families—the Romeus. He was immersed in music from early childhood. At the age of four, he began studying piano, theory, and solfeggio with his mother, Zenaida Romeu González (1910–1985), a pianist, composer, and pedagogue who had performed Mendelssohn's Piano Concerto No. 1 with the Havana Symphony Orchestra under Gonzalo Roig in 1936. His rapid progress led to early recognition as a child prodigy, performing on Cuban radio and early television. He appeared on programs broadcast by Radio Cadena Azul, CMQ, and CMBN, and on pioneering television shows directed by Gaspar Pumarejo, who introduced television to Cuba in 1950. At sixteen, he joined the Cuban Navy Band as a drummer under his grandfather's direction, marking the beginning of his professional career. Soon after, he was performing at the Sans Souci Cabaret under his uncle Rubén Romeu González, and later at the legendary Tropicana Cabaret alongside his uncle Armando Romeu Jr., founder of the Orquesta Cubana de Música Moderna. Under Armando Jr.'s mentorship, de Sequeira studied harmony, composition, and orchestration, developing the rigorous musical foundation that would shape his later innovations in jazz and popular music.

== Career ==
By the early 1960s, Armando de Sequeira Romeu was directing small jazz ensembles that blended Cuban rhythmic structures with modern harmony—groups later recognized as conceptual precursors of the Orquesta Cubana de Música Moderna (OCMM). When the OCMM was formally established in 1967 under his uncle Armando Romeu Jr., de Sequeira's musicians, scores, and original arrangements were incorporated into its core repertoire, making him one of its early creative architects. Among his notable compositions were "Te vas a casar" ("You're Going to Get Married") and "Pero tú vendrás" ("But You Will Come"), recorded for Areito/EGREM, merging jazz harmony with Cuban popular forms. His modern-jazz vision directly influenced the next generation of OCMM musicians—Chucho Valdés, Paquito D'Rivera, and Carlos Emilio Morales—who would later establish Irakere. Historians identify the OCMM as the stylistic and personnel bridge between de Sequeira's generation and the founding of Irakere. Through his mentorship, repertoire, and pioneering use of electric bass and jazz orchestration, de Sequeira is recognized as one of the early innovators linking the Romeu dynasty's orchestral tradition with modern Cuban jazz.

During the 1960s and 1970s he composed and arranged prolifically for the Areito (EGREM) label, directing sessions for singers such as Luisa María Güell, Georgia Gálvez, and Maggie Carlés, and collaborating with musicians including Bobby Carcassés and Peruchín. He participated in albums such as Piano y Ritmo (Areito LPA-1038, 1966), led by Chucho Valdés and Rafael Somavilla, where his Pero tú vendrás appears. In 1964, de Sequeira composed the song "Invitación a una locura" ("Invitation to a Madness"), recorded by a young Paquito D'Rivera as his first single for EGREM (EP-6040). According to Gladys Palmera, "the recording that Paquito D'Rivera made of a composition by Armandito Sequeira marked the first step in D'Rivera's discography, the beginning of his distinguished recording career." This early collaboration positioned de Sequeira among the creative roots of the Latin-jazz movement that would later reach global recognition through Irakere. In the scarcity of post-revolution Cuba, de Sequeira built one of the island's first homemade electric basses using piano strings—an act described by CubitaNOW as emblematic of his ingenuity and determination. He continued performing on bass, drums, and piano at Havana's cabarets, concert halls, and recording studios, often appearing with the Orquesta Cubana de Música Moderna and at the Tropicana Cabaret, where he had earlier accompanied Nat King Cole.

Beyond concert and recording work, de Sequeira also contributed to Cuban cinema and broadcast media. He collaborated with the Instituto Cubano del Arte e Industria Cinematográficos (ICAIC) on incidental music for short films such as Elena and El Final (The Ending), noted in cultural commentary by Rialta. He also performed frequently at the Radiocentro CMQ complex in Havana, whose studios housed both radio and television productions, linking his work to Cuba's national broadcasting industry.

Settling later in Miami, de Sequeira became a cultural bridge between Cuba and the United States, mentoring younger musicians and reviving acoustic performance through the family ensemble Jazz en Familia (1995–2007).

== Ensembles ==
Throughout the 1960s, Armando de Sequeira Romeu led several ensembles under his own direction that served as a creative bridge toward the later formation of the Orquesta Cubana de Música Moderna.

=== Los Átomos ===
Los Átomos was one of the earliest electric-jazz and pop ensembles in Havana led by de Sequeira. The group performed his original arrangements and became known for blending Cuban rhythmic styles with early rock and jazz influences. They accompanied singer Luisa María Güell on her album Cuando el sol (When the Sun Shines, Areito LD-3253, 1965), credited to Los Átomos (de Armando Zequeira).

=== Los Cinco de Armandito Sequeira Romeu ===
Founded and directed by de Sequeira in the mid-1960s, this quintet recorded "Pero tú vendrás" ("But You Will Come") with vocalist Georgia Gálvez for Areito EPA-1065, fusing bossa-nova harmony with Cuban pop-jazz elements. The group also launched singer Maggie Carlés, who recorded several of de Sequeira's compositions, including "Un final inesperado" ("An Unexpected Ending"), "Te vas a casar" ("You're Going to Get Married"), and "Solo sé (que no me arrepiento)" ("I Only Know [That I Do Not Regret]"). These early recordings, produced under de Sequeira's direction, are regarded as cornerstones of 1960s Cuban popular music.

=== Los Fantásticos de Armandito Sequeira Romeu ===
Highlighted by Gladys Palmera among the orchestras of the Romeu dynasty, the group combined swing, danzón, and modern jazz, reflecting Havana's post-revolution nightlife transition. Its repertoire included both instrumental arrangements and vocal numbers performed on Cuban radio and television variety programs of the late 1960s.

=== The Armandito Sequeira Jazz Quartet ===
An acoustic jazz combo formed by de Sequeira to explore small-ensemble improvisation rooted in Cuban rhythm. Its lineup featured Peruchín (piano), Tibo Lee (drums), Regino Tellechea (vocals), and de Sequeira (upright bass). The quartet performed original pieces and arrangements bridging Cuban traditional forms with modern jazz idioms, appearing in Havana clubs and studios during the 1960s.

== Annotated discography ==
Armando de Sequeira Romeu composed, arranged, and directed a wide range of works recorded for Areito (EGREM) and Produfon/BASF between the 1960s and 1970s. His catalog spans jazz, bolero, pop, and bossa-nova styles, performed by many of Cuba's leading singers and orchestras.

=== With Luisa María Güell ===
- 1965 – Cuando el sol (When the Sun Shines) – Areito LD-3253 LP – Los Átomos (de Armando Zequeira); arrangements and direction by de Sequeira.
- 1965 – "Es mi juventud / Cuando el sol" ("It's My Youth / When the Sun Shines") – EGREM EP-6016 7″ single – Cuban pop-jazz fusion ensemble under his direction.

=== With Georgia Gálvez ===
- 1964 – "Pero tú vendrás" ("But You Will Come") – Areito EPA-1065 7″ EP – performed by Georgia Gálvez with Los Cinco de Armandito Sequeira Romeu; bossa-nova and jazz fusion.
- 1964 – "Invitación a una locura" ("Invitation to a Madness") – EGREM EP-6040 7″ single – composed by de Sequeira and recorded by Paquito D'Rivera; first record in D'Rivera's discography.

=== With Maggie Carlés ===
Armandito de Sequeira Romeu discovered and produced the teenage singer Maggie Carlés, arranging and composing her first recordings for Areito/EGREM:

- 1968 – "Un final inesperado" ("An Unexpected Ending") – Areito EP-6108 7″ single.
- 1968 – "Solo sé (que no me arrepiento)" ("I Only Know [That I Do Not Regret]") – Areito EP-6108.
- 1968 – "Mañana" ("Tomorrow") – Areito EP-6108.
- 1969 – "Te vas a casar" ("You're Going to Get Married") – also recorded by the Orquesta Cubana de Música Moderna on Cuba que linda es Cuba Vol. II (1969).

Additional broadcast works (1968–70): "Dame un beso" ("Give Me a Kiss"), "Adiós amor" ("Goodbye My Love"), "Qué me estás haciendo" ("What Are You Doing to Me"), "Me falta valor (para renunciar a ti)" ("I Lack the Courage to Give You Up"), "Un chico de ojos verdes" ("A Green-Eyed Boy"), and "La vida siempre empieza (cuando quieras tú)" ("Life Always Begins Whenever You Wish") – theme for Radio Progreso's soap opera Novela de las Dos.

=== Renditions by other artists ===
- Paquito D'Rivera – "Invitación a una locura" (EGREM EP-6040, 1964) – first recording in his career.
- Chucho Valdés – "Pero tú vendrás" on Piano y Ritmo (Areito LPA-1038, 1966).
- Orquesta Aragón – "Un final inesperado" on Orquesta Aragón (Produfon/BASF, 1976).
- Orquesta Cubana de Música Moderna – "Te vas a casar" (Areito 1969) – arranged by Rafael Somavilla and directed by Armando Romeu Jr..
- Los Magnéticos – "Pero tú vendrás" directed by José Antonio Acosta (with Maggie Carlés on vocals).
- Dany Puga – "Tú serás, yo lo sé" ("You Will Be, I Know It") – Areito EP-6090 (1968).

== Film and television work ==
De Sequeira contributed to Cuban cinema through the ICAIC, writing and performing music for short films such as Elena and El Final (The Ending). His compositions were praised for their fusion of classical texture and Cuban rhythm within cinematic contexts. He also appeared in live broadcasts at Radiocentro CMQ and Radio Progreso, creating scores for television dramas and variety shows during the 1960s and 1970s.

== Mentorship and influence ==
Armando de Sequeira Romeu served as a mentor to younger musicians who would shape modern Cuban jazz.

=== Mentorship to Chucho Valdés ===
He introduced pianist Chucho Valdés to his mother Zenaida Romeu González, under whose tutelage Valdés studied harmony and counterpoint—forming the foundation of his later innovations with the Orquesta Cubana de Música Moderna and Irakere.

=== Mentorship to Bobby Carcassés ===
Singer-instrumentalist Bobby Carcassés credited de Sequeira with introducing him to the double bass and "the mysteries of swing", a formative influence on Carcassés's signature jazz style.

=== Mentorship to Maggie Carlés ===
He discovered and mentored Maggie Carlés, arranging her early recordings and ensuring she studied solfeggio and voice with his mother Zenaida Romeu, continuing the family's pedagogical lineage.

== Romeu family dynasty ==
The Romeu family dynasty represents an enduring musical lineage in Cuban history – a five-generation heritage of composers, conductors, educators, and innovators whose work spans the nation's evolution from danzón and classical symphony to modern jazz and contemporary global music.

Armando de Sequeira Romeu was born into this lineage, surrounded by mentors and family members whose artistry shaped every aspect of Cuba's musical life:

- Zenaida Romeu González (1910–1985) – his mother; pianist-composer-pedagogue who performed Mendelssohn's *Piano Concerto No. 1* with the Havana Symphony in 1936.
- Armando Alodio Romeu Marrero – his grandfather; longtime director of the Cuban Navy Band and inventor of the *aparato autógrafo*, a proto piano-roll device.
- Antonio María Romeu (1876–1955) – great-uncle; Father of the Danzón, composer of "Tres lindas cubanas" ("Three Pretty Cuban Girls").
- Armando Romeu Jr. – uncle; founder of the Orquesta Cubana de Música Moderna (1967).
- Rubén Romeu González – uncle; violinist-saxophonist, director of the Cuban Navy Band.
- Mario Romeu González – uncle; classical pianist and conductor.
- Zulema Romeu – aunt; pianist-accordionist-educator, Musical Director at Conchita Espinosa Academy (Miami).
- Gabriel de Sequeira Romeu ("Puly") – brother; pioneering radio/TV engineer and entertainer.
- Zenaida Bárbara Romeu Castro – sister; conductor-founder of Camerata Romeu.
- Jeannette Claudine Romeu – daughter; pianist-producer-electronic artist continuing the dynasty internationally.

== Jazz en Familia ==
Jazz en Familia (Jazz in the Family) was an all-acoustic ensemble founded by Jeannette Claudine Romeu to unite three generations of the family under Armando de Sequeira Romeu's musical direction. It premiered at the Sweetheart Piano Concert in Aventura, Florida (1995), presented by Steinway & Sons and the City of Aventura. Line-up: Armando de Sequeira Romeu (upright bass), Zulema Romeu (accordion), Armando Romeu III (vibraphone), Alberto Romeu (drums), Jeannette Claudine Romeu (piano/vocals). The family later performed at the Arturo Sandoval Jazz Club, Donald Trump Grande Resort, and Steinway & Sons Miami showroom, receiving civic honors from Miami mayor Tomás Regalado (2007).
