= Curt Massey =

American musician

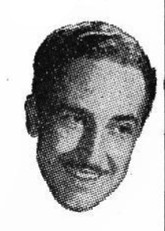
- Curt Massey, c. 1945
- Born: Curt Massey; May 3, 1910; Midland, Texas
- Died: October 21, 1991 (aged 81); Rancho Mirage, California
- Occupations: Singer, musician
- Spouse: Edythe
- Children: 2

Curt Massey (May 3, 1910 – October 21, 1991) was a musician in the old-time radio era.

== Early years ==
Massey was born in Midland, Texas, the son of Mr. and Mrs. Henry Austin Massey. He had six brothers and one sister. He came from a musical family, the best known of whom was probably Louise Massey, a country and western singer. Their father was Henry Massey. As a youngster, he studied violin, trumpet, cornet, and piano. He went on to study music at the Horner Conservatory of Music in Kansas City.

Curt played violin for the family's musical group, Louise Massey and the Westerners.

== Radio ==
Massey first worked professionally with the orchestra at the Pla-Mor ballroom in Kansas City. He became the group's director.

Massey had two self-titled music-variety programs. Curt Massey Time was on CBS beginning in 1943; The Curt Massey Show was on ABC beginning in 1949. The latter co-starred Martha Tilton and was sometimes billed as The Curt Massey and Martha Tilton Show or as Alka-Seltzer Time.

Other programs on which Massey was featured included Nash-Kelvinator's Musical Hits, Sheaffer World Parade, Romance in Rhythm, Twilight Trail, The Friday Night Show, The Andrews Sisters Program, Avalon Time, KMBC Brush Creek Follies, Holiday for Music, Plantation Jubilee, and Plantation Party. On January 2, 1956, Massey debuted on KNX radio in Los Angeles with a 25-minute weeknight program. It lasted three months.

In some cases, Massey arranged music for programs in addition to singing and playing instruments.

== Television ==
In October 1956, Massey began a Monday-Thursday program on KRCA-TV in Los Angeles, California. The 6:15 p.m. (Pacific Time) program also featured Martha Tilton and Country Washburn and was broadcast in color at least during Summer 1959. Massey also wrote and sang the theme song for the television series Petticoat Junction.

== Recognition ==
In 1961, Massey received an Emmy Award "for his career in radio and television."

== Personal life ==
Massey and his wife, the former Edythe Williams, had two sons, Stephen and David.

=== Death ===
Massey died October 21, 1991, at Eisenhower Medical Center in Rancho Mirage, California. He was 81.

== Filmography ==
=== Film ===
Year	Title	Role	Notes
1936	The Hills of Old Wyomin'	Himself as a Westerners Band Member	Short film directed by Dave Fleischer.
1937	Twilight on the Trail	Himself as a Member of The Westerners Band	Short film directed by Dave Fleischer.; Uncredited
1938	Love Goes West	Himself as a Member of The Westerners Band	Short film directed by Robert Hall.; Uncredited
1938	Where the Buffalo Roam	Fiddle Player	Directed by Albert Herman.; Uncredited

=== Television ===
Year	Title	Role	Notes
1963	The Beverly Hillbillies	Violinist	Episode: "The Garden Party" (S 2:Ep 11)
1971	The Beverly Hillbillies	Officer Massey	Episode: "Jethro Returns" (S 9:Ep 24)

=== Screenplay credits ===
Year	Title	Notes
1966	Petticoat Junction	Episode: "Kate Grounds Selma Plout" (S 4:Ep 7)

=== Television composer credits ===
Year	Title	Notes
1963–70	Petticoat Junction	199 episodes
1964–71	The Beverly Hillbillies	222 episodes

=== Soundtrack credits ===
Year	Title	Role	Notes
1936	The Hills of Old Wyomin'		Member of The Westerners Band
1937	Twilight on the Trail		Member of The Westerners Band
1944	Swing in the Saddle	Writer	Dude Cowboy; Uncredited
1948	The Strawberry Roan	Writer	The Angel Song (When the Angels turn the lights on in Heaven)

== Partial discography ==
- If I Had My Way (Columbia 1945)
- You've Got Me Where You Want Me (Columbia 1945)
- Sweetheart of My Dreams (Columbia 1945)
- Candy (Columbia 1945)
- Five Minutes More (Cadet 1946)
