= Stars for Defense =

Stars for Defense is a series of albums recorded for the United States Federal Civil Defense Administration from 1956 to 1967. Radio stations were instructed to broadcast the content to help Americans prepare for possible disasters, like a nuclear attack. They contained both music and interviews.

The total running time was approximately 15 minutes per side and only on a specific date was it to be played. M.C. Jay Jackson would introduces the week's musical guests (one week per side). The background music was supplied by Ray Bloch and his orchestra.

== Discography ==
- Program No. 1 Frankie Laine - (Do Not Play Before Oct 7, 1956)
- Program No. 2 Eydie Gorme - (Do Not Play Before Oct 14, 1956)
- Program No. 3 Dick Haymes - (Do Not Play Before Oct 21, 1956)
- Program No. 4 Dinah Shore - (Do Not Play Before Oct 28, 1956)
- Program No. 5 Johnny Mercer - (Do Not Play Before Nov 4, 1956)
- Program No. 6 The Chordettes - (Do Not Play Before Nov 11, 1956)
- Program No. 7 Al Hibbler - (Do Not Play Before Nov 18, 1956)
- Program No. 8 The Four Lads - (Do Not Play Before Nov 25, 1956)
- Program No. 9 Don Cherry - (Do Not Play Before Dec. 2, 1956)
- Program No. 10 Sunny Gale - (Do Not Play Before Dec. 9, 1956)
- Program No. 11 Burl Ives - (Do Not Play Before Dec. 16, 1956)
- Program No. 12 Robert Weede - (Do Not Play Before Dec. 23, 1956)
- Program No. 15 Martha Wright - (Do Not Play Before Jan. 13, 1957)
- Program No. 51 Lanny Ross - (Do Not Play Before Sept. 22, 1957)
- Program No. 52 James Melton - (Do Not Play Before Sept. 29, 1957)
- Program No. 59 Janet Blair 1957
- Program No. 60 The Chordettes 1957
- Program No. 67 Abe Burrows - (Do Not Play Before Jan. 12, 1958)
- Program No. 68 The Three Suns & Annette Warren 1958
- Program No. 69 Roger Williams & The Four Esquires 1958
- Program No. 70 Victor Borge 1958
- Program No. 75 The Ink Spots
- Program No. 76 June Valli
- Program No. 77 Les Paul, Mary Ford
- Program No. 78 Jeri Southern
- Program No. 111 Roberta Sherwood - (Do Not Play Before Nov. 16, 1958)
- Program No. 112 Dixieland All Stars - (Do Not Play Before Nov. 23, 1958)
- Program No. 123 Rosemary Clooney
- Program No. 124 Gloria Wood Choir
- Program No. 125 Margaret Whiting 1959
- Program No. 126 Bing Crosby 1959
- Program No. 129 Anna Maria Alberghetti 1959
- Program No. 130 Roger Williams 1959
- Program No. 131 Evelyn Knight 1959
- Program No. 132 Andy Griffith 1959
- Program No. 139 Don Shirley Trio - (Do Not Play Before May 31, 1959)
- Program No. 140 Dick Haymes - (Do Not Play Before June 7, 1959)
- Program No. 149 Jimmy Dean - (Do Not Play Before Aug. 9,1959)
- Program No. 150 Jane Morgan - (Do Not Play Before Aug. 16, 1959)
- Program No. 151 Don Cherry - (Do Not Play Before Aug. 23,1959)
- Program No. 152 Lu Ann Simms - (Do Not Play Before Aug.30, 1959)
- Program No. 153 Alan Dale - (Do Not Play Before Sept. 6, 1959)
- Program No. 154 Count Basie - (Do Not Play Before Sept. 13, 1959)
- Program No. 155 Kay Armen - (Do Not Play Before Sept. 20, 1959)
- Program No. 156 Andy Williams - (Do Not Play Before Sept. 27, 1959)
- Program No. 175 Roy Hamilton Feb. 7, 1960 - 14: 41 minutes - "sing you sinners, ebb tide, Kerry dances, you'll never walk alone
- Program No. 176 The Chordettes Feb. 14, 1960 - 14: 41 minutes - "Alabama jubilee, Don't take your love from me, seventy six trombones, wait till the sun shines Nellie"
- Program No. 179 Johnny Desmond - (Do Not Play Before March 6, 1960)
- Program No. 180 Diahann Carroll - (Do Not Play Before March 13, 1960)
- Program No. 185 Johnny Nash - (Do Not Play Before April 17, 1960)
- Program No. 186 Evelyn Knight - (Do Not Play Before April 24, 1960)
- Program No. 187 Lou Monte - (Do Not Play Before May 1, 1960)
- Program No. 188 The Four Lads - (Do Not Play Before May 8, 1960)
- Program No. 189 Hildegarde - (Do Not Play Before May 15, 1960)
- Program No. 190 Glenn Miller - (Do Not Play Before May 22, 1960)
- Program No. 191 Eartha Kitt - (Do Not Play Before May 29, 1960)"Independent", "Old-Fashioned Girl" and "C'est Si Bon"
- Program No. 192 Somethin' Smith & the Redheads - (Do Not Play Before June 5, 1960)"You Always Hurt the One You Love", "A Hundred Years From the Day" and "It's A Sin To Tell A Lie".
- Program No. 193 Dorothy Collins - (Do Not Play Before June 12, 1960)"Several songs part Italian and Melancholy Baby, When I Fall In Love" - Ray Bloch plays "The Best Things in Life Are Free"
- Program No. 194 The Four Aces - (Do Not Play Before June 19, 1960)"Poor Butterfly", "Three Coins in the Fountain" and "Love Is A Many Splendored Thing" - Ray Bloch plays "How High The Moon"
- Program No. 195 June Valli - (Do Not Play Before June 26, 1960)
- Program No. 196 Frankie Laine - (Do Not Play Before July 3, 1960)
- Program No. 197 Helen Forrest - (Do Not Play Before July 10, 1960)
- Program No. 198 The Crewcuts - (Do Not Play Before July 17, 1960)
- Program No. 199 Betty Madigan - (Do Not Play Before July 24, 1960)
- Program No. 200 Don Cherry - (Do Not Play Before July 31, 1960)
- Program No. 201 Georgia Gibbs - (Do Not Play Before August 7, 1960)
- Program No. 202 Johnny Mathis - (Do Not Play Before August 14, 1960)
- Program No. 203 The Dukes Of Dixieland - (Do Not Play Before August 21, 1960)
- Program No. 204 Kay Armen - (Do Not Play Before August 28, 1960)
- Program No. 215 Roy Hamilton sing three songs (Do Not Play Before November 13, 1960)
- Program No. 216 Jack Haskell - (Do Not Play Before November 20, 1960)
- Program No. 227 Jonah Jones - (Do Not Play Before January 22, 1961) Sings 3 songs.
- Program No. 228 Eileen Barton - (Do Not Play Before January 29, 1961) Sings 3 songs.
- Program No. 229 Johnny Nash
- Program No. 230 Jaye P. Morgan
- Program No. 231 The Four Lads (Do Not Play Before March 16, 1961)
- Program No. 232 Teresa Brewer (Do Not Play Before March 23, 1961)
- Program No. 241 Dick Haymes & Fran Jeffries - (Do Not Play Before May 21, 1961)
- Program No. 242 Ted Lewis - (Do Not Play Before May 28, 1961)
- Program No. 253 Sarah Vaughan (Do Not Play Before August 13, 1961) sings "The Best Is Yet To Come", "Moonlight In Vermont" and "Day In, Day Out".
- Program No. 254 Tommy Leonetti (Do Not Play Before August 20, 1961) performs "That Old Black Magic", "The One I Love Belongs To Somebody Else" and "The Way You Look Tonight".
- Program No. 273 The Merrill Staton Voices
- Program No. 274 Felicia Sanders
- Program No. 289 Betty Johnson
- Program No. 290 The Ames Brothers
- Program No. 293 Carmel Quinn
- Program No. 294 Johnny Desmond
- Program No. 297 Toni Arden
- Program No. 298 Robert Merrill
- Program No. 303 Sally Ann Howes (Do Not Play Before July 22, 1962) sings "Isn't It Romantic?", "Another Time, Another Place", and "You're Nearer".
- Program No. 304 Cab Calloway (Do Not Play Before July 29, 1962) sings "Get Happy", "It Ain't Necessarily So" and "Jumpin' Jive".
- Program No. 307 Earl Wrightson (Do Not Play Before August 19, 1962) sings "They Call the Wind Maria", "If Ever I Would Leave You", and "I Still See Elisa".
- Program No. 308 Don Cherry (Do Not Play Before August 26, 1962) sings "You Make Me Feel So Young", "I'm Just a Country Boy" and "Too Close For Comfort".
- Program No. 313 The Modernaires (Do Not Play Before September 30, 1962)
- Program No. 314 Tommy Leonetti (Do Not Play Before October 7, 1962)
- Program No. 319 Buddy Greco (Do Not Play Before November 11, 1962) Link to Full Audio of Program #319
- Program No. 320 Four Lads (Do Not Play Before November 19, 1962)
- Program No. 329 Merv Griffin (Do Not Play Before Jan. 20, 1963)
- Program No. 330 June Valli (Do Not Play Before Jan. 27, 1963)
- Program No. 333 Connee Boswell
- Program No. 334 Jerry Vale
- Program No. 335 Johnnie Ray (Do Not Play Before March 3, 1963) sings "I Won't Dance"/"When You're Smiling" medley, "Moon River" and "What Kind of Fool Am I?"
- Program No. 336 Erroll Garner (Do Not Play Before March 10, 1963) Trio (with Kelly Martin and Al Hall) performs "Back in Your Own Backyard", "El Papa Grande", and "Just One of Those Things".
- Program No. 337 Betty Johnson (Do Not Play Before March 17, 1963) sings "Who Cares?", "How Little We Know", and "My Favorite Things."
- Program No. 338 The Buffalo Bills (Do Not Play Before March 24, 1963) Quartet (Vern Reed, Al Shea, Scotty Ward, Jim Jones) sing "Two Blue Pigeons", "Your Eyes Told Me So" and "You Don't Need Her". Mississippi Mudcats perform "Riverboat Shuffle".
- Program No. 343 The Chordettes(1963) - sing three songs
- Program No. 344 Peter Duchin (1963) – sings three songs
- Program No. 377 Stuart Foster (Do Not Play Before January 21, February 4, 1962) sings 3 songs
- Program No. 378 The Chordettes (Do Not Play Before January 28, 1962) sing three songs
- Program No. 393 Eddy Arnold
- Program No. 394 Leslie Uggams
- Program No. 407 Ray Charles Singers (Do not play before July 19, 1964)
- Program No. 408 Kay Armen (Do not play before July 26, 1964)
- Program No. 415 Arthur Godfrey (Do not play before September 13, 1964)
- Program No. 416 Vivienne Della Chiesa (Do not play before September 20, 1964)
- Program No. 417 Joe Williams (Do not play before September 27, 1964)
- Program No. 419 Jill Corey (Do not play before October 4, 1964)
- Program No. 519 Lesley Gore (1966)
- Program No. 543 Patricia Marand (Do not play before March 5, 1967)
- Gogi Grant
- The Kirby Stone Four
- Denise Lor
- Jaye P. Morgan
- Alan Dale
- Kay Armen
- Mel Tormé
- Earl Wrightson & Lois Hunt
- Julie Wilson
- Bert Parks
- Tex Beneke
- Della Reese
- Jill Corey
- Vaughn Munroe
- Stewart Foster
- Chris Connor
- Don Cornell
- José Melis
- Dorothy Sarnoff

(incomplete listing)
