= Sarah Kreindler =

American violinist (1912–1993)

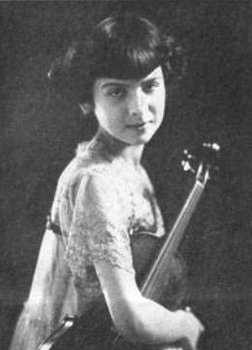
- Sarah Kreindler, from a 1922 publication
- Born: March 17, 1912; San Francisco, California, U.S.
- Died: December 19, 1993 (aged 81); Thousand Oaks, California, U.S.
- Other names: Sarah Baltor, Sarah Wolper, Sally Raderman
- Occupation: Violinist

Sarah Kreindler (March 17, 1912 – December 19, 1993), also known as Sally Raderman, was an American violinist. After a concert career in her youth, she played in studio orchestras in Hollywood and accompanied Nat King Cole, Elvis Presley, Frank Sinatra, and other popular singers.

== Early life and education ==
Kreindler was born in San Francisco, the daughter of Herman Kreindler and Mollie Bercovich Kreindler. Her parents were both born in Romania; her father was a businessman. She had two older sisters. She did not attend school as a young girl, instead focusing on violin instruction with Sigmund Anker. Yehudi Menuhin was another student of Anker's at the time, and remembered Kreindler as a peer. At age 12, she began attending the Curtis Institute of Music in Philadelphia. She also studied with Mishel Piastro.

== Career ==
Kreindler was known as a child musical prodigy when she gave her first public recital in 1921. "She approaches her instrumet with rare poise, while her attack is marked by a deft sureness," commented a reviewer that year. She was also heard in radio concerts in the 1920s. In 1933 she played in an all-female concert, benefiting needy musicians in San Francisco.

As an adult, Kreindler played in Hollywood studio orchestras, on film soundtracks including The Black Castle (1952), North by Northwest (1959), Lonely Are The Brave (1962), A Gathering of Eagles (1963), Tobruk (1967), Hellfighters (1968), and The Day of the Locust (1975). She toured for ten years with Frank Sinatra's orchestra, and can be heard on recordings by Nat King Cole, Elvis Presley, Sérgio Mendes, Mel Tormé, Perry Como, Barbra Streisand, and Andy Williams.

Later in life, Kreindler was a member of the Ventura County Symphony, and concertmaster of the Ventura Community Orchestra, the Moorpark Community College Orchestra, and the Simi Valley Community Orchestra. Kreindler owned and played a Francesco Rugeri violin made in 1672. In 1981, she sold her second husband's 1868 Vuillaume violin, heard on hundreds of film soundtracks, to San Francisco violinist Jeremy Cohen.

== Personal life ==
In 1932, Kreindler married sculptor Norman Baltor (who was also known as Norman Wolper). They had a daughter, Marisa. They divorced in 1948. Her second husband was fellow violinist Lou Raderman; they married in 1950, and he died in 1981. She died in 1993, at the age of 81, in Thousand Oaks, California.
