= The Nat King Cole Story =

Studio album by Nat King Cole
- Released: 1961
- Recorded: (original recordings) – January 30, May 6, September 30, 1958, April 1959, March 1, 1960 (new recordings) – March 22–24, 27, 29–30, April 3, July 6, 19–20, 1961
- Studio: Capitol (New York); Capitol (Hollywood)
- Genre: Traditional pop, vocal jazz
- Length: 103:45
- Label: Capitol
- Producer: Lee Gillette

Nat King Cole chronology
| The Magic of Christmas (1960) | The Nat King Cole Story (1961) | The Touch of Your Lips (1961) |

Professional ratings
Review scores
| Source | Rating |
|---|---|
| AllMusic | 4/5 stars |
| The Rolling Stone Jazz Record Guide | 3/5 stars |

The Nat King Cole Story is a 1961 album by Nat King Cole. The album was a retrospective of Cole's recording career, designed to present many of his earlier hits in new recordings featuring stereo sound. Cole is accompanied on the re-recordings by many of the notable arrangers and bands that had appeared with him on the original records.

Of particular note is Cole's re-recording of "The Christmas Song". This was Cole's fourth, and final, recording of the song, and also the first version recorded in stereo. This recording of the song was subsequently added to a 1963 reissue of Cole's 1960 LP The Magic of Christmas (the album concurrently retitled The Christmas Song and given new cover art), and remains one of Cole's best-known recordings and among the most-played Christmas tunes on radio each December.

This compilation also marks the last time Cole would record with a Trio. In addition to The Christmas Song, referenced above, the album includes Cole's recreations in stereo of five of his early Trio hits, including "Straighten Up and Fly Right", "Sweet Lorraine", "It's Only a Paper Moon", "(Get Your Kicks on) Route 66" and "For Sentimental Reasons", in addition to "Orange Colored Sky", a re-recording of a song originally done in 1950 in conjunction with the Stan Kenton Orchestra.

At the 4th Annual Grammy Awards, The Nat King Cole Story was nominated for the Grammy Award for Album of the Year.

== Track listing ==
Disc 1

1. "Straighten Up and Fly Right" (Nat King Cole, Irving Mills) – 2:36
2. "Sweet Lorraine" (Cliff Burwell, Mitchell Parish) – 3:22
3. "It's Only a Paper Moon" (Harold Arlen, Yip Harburg, Billy Rose) – 2:57
4. "(Get Your Kicks on) Route 66" (Bobby Troup) – 2:56
5. "(I Love You) For Sentimental Reasons" (William Best, Deek Watson) – 3:04
6. "The Christmas Song (Merry Christmas to You)" (Mel Tormé, Robert Wells) – 3:11
7. "Nature Boy" (Eden Ahbez) – 2:53
8. "Lush Life" (Billy Strayhorn) – 3:46
9. "Calypso Blues" (Cole, D.W. George) – 3:25
10. "Mona Lisa" (Ray Evans, Jay Livingston) – 3:27
11. "Orange Colored Sky" (Milton DeLugg, Willie Stein) – 2:33
12. "Too Young" (Sylvia Dee, Sidney Lippman) – 3:24
13. "Unforgettable" (Irving Gordon) – 3:27
14. "Somewhere Along the Way" (Kurt Adams, Sammy Gallop) – 3:00
15. "Walkin' My Baby Back Home" (Fred E. Ahlert, Roy Turk) – 2:42
16. "Pretend" (Lew Douglas, Dan Belloc, Frank LaVere, Cliff Parman) – 2:45
17. "Blue Gardenia" (Lester Lee, Bob Russell) – 3:04
18. "I Am in Love" (Cole Porter) – 2:33

Disc 2

1. "Answer Me, My Love" (Fred Rauch, Carl Sigman, Gerhard Winkler) – 2:56
2. "Smile" (Charlie Chaplin, Geoff Parsons, John Turner) – 2:53
3. "Darling, Je Vous Aime Beaucoup" (Anna Sosenko) – 2:48
4. "The Sand and the Sea" (Hal Hester, Barry Parker) – 2:41
5. "If I May" (Rose Marie McCoy, Charles Singleton) – 2:57
6. "A Blossom Fell" (Howard Barnes, Harold Cornelius, Dominic John) – 2:41
7. "To the Ends of the Earth" (Noel Sherman, Joe Sherman) – 2:25
8. "Night Lights" (Gallop, Chester Conn) – 2:48
9. "Ballerina" (Sigman, Bob Russell) – 2:41
10. "Stardust" (Parish, Hoagy Carmichael) – 3:14
11. "Send for Me" (Ollie Jones) – 2:30
12. "St. Louis Blues" (W. C. Handy) – 2:25
13. "Looking Back" (Brook Benton, Belford Hendricks, Clyde Otis) – 2:26
14. "Non Dimenticar" (Shelly Dobbins, Michele Galdieri, Gino Redi) – 3:07
15. "Paradise" (Nacio Herb Brown, Gordon Clifford) – 3:11
16. "Oh Mary, Don't You Weep" (African-American Spiritual adapted by Nat King Cole & Gordon Jenkins) – 1:55
17. "Ay, Cosita Linda" (Pacho Galan) – 2:14
18. "Wild Is Love" (Ray Rasch, Dotty Wayne) – 2:48

== 2011 reissue ==
In 2011, the Analogue Productions label reissued the album as a 2-disc hybrid SACD set and a 5-disc 45 rpm vinyl set. Both versions feature a new stereo mix of the entire album by Steve Hoffman and Kevin Gray, while the SACD also includes a discrete three-channel mix of most songs. Two bonus tracks ("Ramblin' Rose" and "Those Lazy-Hazy-Crazy Days of Summer") are also included on both versions.

== Personnel ==
=== Performance ===
- Nat King Cole – vocals (1.01–05, 1.08, 1.11, 1.15, 1.18, 2.09, 2.12, 2.15, lead on 1.06-07, 1.09–10, 1.12–14, 1.16–17, 2.01–08, 2.11, 2.13–14, 2.16–18), piano (1.01–05)
- Dale Anderson – percussion (1.08–09, 1.15, 1.17–18, 2.07–09, 2.14)
- George Acevedo – percussion (1.11)
- Everett Barksdale – guitar (2.05, 2.11, 2.13)
- Larry Bunker – percussion (1.11)
- Kenny Burrell – guitar (2.05, 2.11, 2.13)
- John Collins – guitar (1.01–07, 1.10, 1.12–14, 1.16, 2.01–06, 2.11–13, 2.15, 2.17–18)
- Joe Comfort – bass played by (1.08–09, 1.11, 1.15, 1.17–18, 2.07–09, 2.14)
- Rene Faure – piano (2.15)
- First Church of Deliverance Choir – background vocals (2.16)
- Charlie Harris – bass played by (1.01–07, 1.10, 1.12–14, 1.16, 2.01–04, 2.06, 2.12, 2.15, 2.17–18)
- Ernie Hayes – piano (2.05, 2.11, 2.13)
- Al Hendrickson – guitar (1.09, 1.11, 1.17, 2.07–08, 2.14)
- Irakitan Trio – background vocals (2.17)
- Hank Jones – piano (1.06–07, 1.10, 1.13, 2.04, 2.06)
- Lou Levy – piano (2.18)
- Jerry MacKenzie – drums (1.11)
- Red Mitchell – bass played by (1.11)
- Mike Pacheco – percussion (1.09, 1.17, 2.07–08, 2.14)
- Milton Raskin – piano (1.08–09, 1.15, 1.17–18, 2.07–09, 2.14)
- Alvino Rey – guitar (1.08–09, 1.15, 1.17–18, 2.07–09, 2.14)
- Emil Richards – percussion (2.18)
- Paul Smith – piano (1.11)
- Sylvia Telles – additional lead vocals (2.17)
- Lee Young – drums (1.06–18, 2.01–09, 2.11–15, 2.17–18)

=== Production ===
- Nat King Cole – choir arranger, arranger (1.01-05) (2.16, 2.10)
- Ralph Carmichael – arranger, conductor (1.06-10, 1.12–18, 2.01–09, 2.11, 2.13–14)
- Dave Cavanaugh – arranger, conductor (2.17)
- Gordon Jenkins – music arranger, orchestra conductor (2.15), choir arranger, choir conductor (2.16)
- Stan Kenton – conductor (1.11)
- Billy May – arranger, conductor (1.15)
- Nelson Riddle – arranger, conductor (2.12, 2.18)
- Pete Rugolo – arranger (1.08)
