= This Is Nat King Cole =

Compilation album by Nat King Cole
- Released: 1957
- Recorded: 1955–1956
- Genre: Jazz
- Length: 46:59
- Label: Capitol
- Producer: Lee Gillette

Nat King Cole chronology
Ballads of the Day (1956)	This Is Nat King Cole (1957)	After Midnight (1957)

This Is Nat King Cole is an original compilation album by Nat King Cole. It was released in 1957 by Capitol Records. The LP collection reached #18 on the Billboard Magazine album chart.

== Track listing ==
1. "Dreams Can Tell A Lie" (Howard Barnes, Harold Cornelius, Dominic John) - 2:59
2. "I Just Found Out About Love" (Harold Adamson, Jimmy McHugh) - 2:47
3. "Too Young To Go Steady" (Harold Adamson, Jimmy McHugh) - 2:55
4. "Forgive My Heart" (Chester Conn, Sammy Gallop) - 3:02
5. "Annabelle" - 3:23
6. "Nothing Ever Changes My Love For You" - 2:39
7. "To The Ends Of The Earth" (Joe Sherman, Noel Sherman) - 2:19
8. "I'm Gonna Laugh You Right Out Of My Life" (Cy Coleman, Carolyn Leigh) - 3:18
9. "Someone You Love" - 2:54
10. "Love Me As Though There Were No Tomorrow" (Harold Adamson, Jimmy McHugh) - 2:35
11. "That's All" (Alan Brandt, Bob Hayes) - 2:59
12. "Never Let Me Go" (Jay Livingston) - 2:58

Bonus tracks added to later CD re-issue:

13. "Small Towns Are Smile Towns" - 2:45
14. "Don't Hurt the Girl" - 3:21
15. "My Flaming Heart" (Nicholas Brodszky, Leo Robin) - 2:48
16. "United" (Geoffrey Parsons) - 3:17

== Personnel ==
- Nat King Cole - Vocals

Tracks 1, 3, 10,

20-December-1955 (Tuesday) - Hollywood. Capitol Studios

Ed Kusby (tbn); Juan Tizol (v-tbn); George Roberts (b-tbn); James Decker, Vincent DeRosa (fr-h); Harry Klee, Ted Nash, Jim Williamson (sax/wwd); Victor Bay, Alex Beller, Harold Dicterow, Kurt Dieterle, Paul Nero, Nat Ross, Paul Shure, Felix Slatkin (vln); Stan Harris, Paul Robyn, Dave Sterkin (via); James Arkatov, Ray Kramer, Edgar Lustgarten (vlc); unknown (harp); Bill Miller (p); Tiny Mitchell (g); Ray Brown (b); Lee Young (d); Nelson Riddle (arr/cond).

Track 2,

29-December-1955 (Thursday) - Hollywood. Capitol Studios

The Four Knights, unknown (Vocalists); Pete Candoli, Harry Edison, Conrad Gozzo, Mickey Mangano, Shorty Sherock (tpt); Joe Howard, Paul Tanner (tbn); Juan Tizol (v-tbn); George Roberts (b-tbn); Mahlon Clark, Willie Smith, Don Raffell, Buck Skalak, Bob Lawson (sax); Bill Miller (p); Tiny Mitchell (g); Joe Comfort (b); Lee Young (d); Nelson Riddle (arr/cond).

Tracks 4, 8,

20-December-1954 (Monday) - Hollywood. Capitol Studios

The Four Knights (Vocalists); Allan Davies, Marilyn Lewis, Dorothy McCarty, Ginny O'Connor, Charles Schrouder, Clark Yocum, Norma Zimmer (bkv); Harry Edison (tpt); Joe Howard (tbn); Juan Tizol (v-tbn); George Roberts (b-tbn); Vincent DeRosa, Joseph Eger (fr-h); Harry Klee, Ted Nash, Champ Webb (wwd); Israel Baker, Victor Bay, Harry Bluestone, Walter Edelstein, Murray Kellner, Nat Ross, Mischa Russell (vln); Stan Spiegelman, Dave Sterkin (via); Victor Gottlieb, Edgar Lustgarten (vlc); Kathryn Julye (harp); Don Robertson, Ray Turner (p/cel); Al Hendrickson (g); Red Callender (b); Lee Young (d); Nelson Riddle (arr/cond).

Tracks 5, 11,

20-January-1953 (Tuesday) - Hollywood. Capitol Studios

Milt Bernhart, Paul Tanner (tbn); John Cave, Vincent DeRosa (fr-h); Harry Klee, Ted Nash, Jim Williamson (wwd); Victor Bay, Alex Beller, Harry Bluestone, Walter Edelstein, Anatol Kaminsky, Nat Ross, Mischa Russell, Olcott Vail, Gerald Vinci (vln); Alfred Barr, Stan Harris (via); James Arkatov, Armand Kaproff (vlc); Kathryn Julye (harp); Buddy Cole (p/cel); John Collins (g); Charlie Harris (b); Lee Young (d); Nelson Riddle (arr/cond).

Track 6,

07-June-1955 (Tuesday) - Chicago. Universal Recording Studio A

John Collins (eg); Charlie Harris (b); Lee Young (d); Nelson Riddle (arr/cond).

Tracks 7, 12,

04-January-1956 (Wednesday) - Hollywood. Capitol Studios

unknown (Vocalists); Paul Tanner (tbn); Juan Tizol (v-tbn); George Roberts (b-tbn); Sinclair Lott, Richard Perissi (fr-h); Emmett Callen, Vic Garber, Justin Gordon (sax/wwd); Victor Bay, Alex Beller, Walter Edelstein, Dave Frisina, Benny Gill, George Kast, Paul Nero, Erno Neufeld (vln); Stan Harris, Michel Perriere, Milton Thomas (via); Cy Bernard, Armand Kaproff, Eleanor Slatkin (vlc); Kathryn Julye (harp); Bill Miller (p/cel); Tiny Mitchell (g); Joe Comfort (b); Lee Young (d); Bernie Mattinson (perc); Nelson Riddle (arr/cond).

Track 9,

09-June-1955 (Thursday) - Chicago. Universal Recording Studio A

Lee Knight (f), Frank Brouk (fr-h); John Collins (g), Charlie Harris (b), Lee Young (d), Fred Spector (vln); Nelson Riddle (arr/cond).
