= Just One of Those Things =

Just One of Those Things may refer to:

- "Just One of Those Things" (song), a 1935 song written by Cole Porter
- Just One of Those Things (album), a 1957 album by Nat King Cole
- "Just One of Those Things" (Early Edition), an episode of Early Edition
- "Just One of Those Things", an episode of Working Girl

== See also ==
- "One of Those Things"
- "These Foolish Things"
