= Ballads of the Day =

Compilation album by Nat King Cole
- Released: April 1956
- Recorded: January 14, 1953 – August 24, 1954
- Genre: Jazz
- Length: 34:56
- Label: Capitol
- Producer: Lee Gillette

Nat King Cole chronology
The Piano Style of Nat King Cole (1955)	Ballads of the Day (1956)	This Is Nat King Cole (1957)

Ballads of the Day is an album by Nat King Cole. It released in 1956. The album reached a peak position of number 16 on the Billboard 200.

== Track listing ==
1. "A Blossom Fell" (Howard Barnes, Harold Cornelius, Dominic John) - 2:33
2. "Unbelievable" (Jerry Livingston, Irving Gordon) - 3:04
3. "Blue Gardenia" (Bob Russell, Lester Lee) - 2:58
4. "Angel Eyes" (Matt Dennis, Earl Brent) - 3:15
5. "It Happens to Be Me" (Sammy Gallop, Arthur Kent) - 3:09
6. "Smile" (John Turner, Geoffrey Parsons, Charlie Chaplin) - 2:54
7. "Darling, Je Vous Aime Beaucoup" (Anna Sosanko) - 2:51
8. "Alone Too Long" (Arthur Schwartz, Dorothy Fields) - 2:56
9. "My One Sin (In Life)" (Mascherino, Robert Mellin) - 2:59
10. "Return to Paradise" (Dimitri Tiomkin, Ned Washington) - 2:57
11. "If Love Is Good to Me" (Fred Spielman, Redd Evans) - 2:47
12. "The Sand and the Sea" (Hal Hester, B. Parker) - 2:33

== Personnel ==
- Nat King Cole - Vocals, piano
- Nelson Riddle - arranger
- Billy May - arranger on track 4 only
- Lee Gillette - Producer

Tracks 1, 12,

20-December-1954 (Monday) - Hollywood. Capitol Studios

The Four Knights (vocalist); Allan Davies, Marilyn Lewis, Dorothy McCarty, Ginny O'Connor, Charles Schrouder, Clark Yocum, Norma Zimmer (bkv); Harry Edison (tpt); Joe Howard (tbn); Juan Tizol (v-tbn); George Roberts (b-tbn); Vincent DeRosa, Joseph Eger (fr-h); Harry Klee, Ted Nash, Champ Webb (wwd); Israel Baker, Victor Bay, Harry Bluestone, Walter Edelstein, Murray Kellner, Nat Ross, Mischa Russell (vln); Stan Spiegelman, Dave Sterkin (via); Victor Gottlieb, Edgar Lustgarten (vlc); Kathryn Julye (harp); Don Robertson, Ray Turner (p/cel); Al Hendrickson (g); Red Callender (b); Lee Young (d); Nelson Riddle (arr/cond).

Tracks 2, 5, 8,

09-February-1954 (Tuesday) - Hollywood. Capitol Studios

Tommy Pederson (tbn); Juan Tizol (v-tbn); John Cave, Vincent DeRosa (fr-h); Harry Klee, Dominic Mumolo, Jim Williamson (wwd); Victor Bay, Alex Beller, Harry Bluestone, Henry Hill, Erno Neufeld, Nat Ross, Mischa Russell, Felix Slatkin, Marshall Sosson (vln); Michel Perriere, Paul Robyn (via); James Arkatov, Edgar Lustgarten (vlc); Ann Mason Stockton (harp); Geoffrey Clarkson (p/cel); John Collins (g); Charlie Harris (b); Lee Young (d); Nelson Riddle (arr/cond).

Tracks 3, 11,

20-January-1953 (Tuesday) - Hollywood. Capitol Studios

Milt Bernhart, Paul Tanner (tbn); John Cave, Vincent DeRosa (fr-h); Harry Klee, Ted Nash, Jim Williamson (wwd); Victor Bay, Alex Beller, Harry Bluestone, Walter Edelstein, Anatol Kaminsky, Nat Ross, Mischa Russell, Olcott Vail, Gerald Vinci (vln); Alfred Barr, Stan Harris (via); James Arkatov, Armand Kaproff (vlc); Kathryn Julye (harp); Buddy Cole (p/cel); John Collins (g); Charlie Harris (b); Lee Young (d); Nelson Riddle (arr/cond).

Track 4,

14-January-1953 (Wednesday) - Hollywood. Capitol Studios

The Encores (bkv); Tony Facciuto, Conrad Gozzo, Jack Laubach, Robert McKinzie, Andy Peele (tpt); Karl De Karske, Dick Nash, Robert Reisiger, Si Zentner (tbn); Dick Clay, Willie Smith, Charles Deremo, Ted Nash, Jack Agee (wwd); Cliff Fishback (p); John Collins (g); Ralph Pena (b); John Markham (d); Jack Costanzo (congas); Billy May (arr/cond).

Track 6,

27-July-1954 (Tuesday) - Hollywood. Capitol Studios

Joe Howard (tbn); George Roberts (b-tbn); Vincent DeRosa, William Hinshaw (fr-h); John Hacker, Harry Klee, Dominic Mumolo (wwd); Len Atkins, Victor Bay, Alex Beller, Harry Bluestone, Walter Edelstein, Nat Ross, Mischa Russell, Eudice Shapiro, Paul Shure, Felix Slatkin, Marshall Sosson, Gerald Vinci (vln); Stan Harris, Paul Robyn, Barbara Simons, Dave Sterkin (via); Cy Bernard, Armand Kaproff, Ray Kramer, Eleanor Slatkin (vlc); Kathryn Julye (harp); Bill Miller (p/cel); John Collins (g); Charlie Harris (b); Lee Young (d); Lou Singer (perc); Nelson Riddle (arr/cond).

Track 7,

24-August-1953 (Monday) - Hollywood. Capitol Studios

Joe Howard (tbn); George Roberts (b-tbn); Vincent DeRosa, John Graas (fr-h); Julie Kinsler, Ted Nash, Harry Steinfeld (wwd); Victor Bay, Alex Beller, Harry Bluestone, Walter Edelstein, Henry Hill, Paul Nero, Mischa Russell, Paul Shure, Felix Slatkin (vln); Lou Kievman, Stan Spiegelman (via); Cy Bernard, Armand Kaproff (vlc); Ann Mason Stockton (harp); Buddy Cole (p); John Collins (g); Charlie Harris (b); Lee Young (d); Nelson Riddle (arr/cond).

Track 9,

24-August-1954 (Tuesday) - Hollywood. Capitol Studios

Si Zentner (tbn); George Roberts (b-tbn); John Cave, Vince DeRosa (fr-h); John Hacker, Dominic Mumolo, Jim Williamson (wwd); Victor Bay, Alex Beller, Harry Bluestone, Walter Edelstein, Henry Hill, Mischa Russell, Paul Shure, Felix Slatkin (vn), Stan Harris, Dave Sterkin (vln); Cy Bernard, Edgar Lustgarten, Eleanor Slatkin (vlc); Ann Mason Stockton (harp); Paul Smith (p); John Collins (g); Charlie Harris (b); Lee Young (d); Nelson Riddle (arr/cond).

Track 10,

31-March-1953 (Tuesday) - Chicago. Universal Recording Studio A

John Collins (g); Charlie Harris (b); Lee Young (d); Nelson Riddle (arr/cond).
