= After Midnight (Nat King Cole album) =

1957 jazz album by Nat King Cole

Studio album by Nat King Cole
- Released: 1957
- Recorded: August–September 1956
- Studios: Capitol, Hollywood
- Genre: Jazz
- Length: 43:41
- Label: Capitol

Nat King Cole chronology
This Is Nat King Cole (1957)	After Midnight (1957)	Just One Of Those Things (1957)

Professional ratings
Review scores
Source	Rating
AllMusic	4/5 stars
The Penguin Guide to Jazz Recordings	3.5/4 stars

After Midnight is a 1957 jazz album by "Nat King Cole and his trio" on Capitol Records. It peaked at number 13 on the U.S. Billboard Pop Albums chart. The Penguin Guide to Jazz listed the album as part of its suggested "core collection".

== Release history ==
Initially, the album was released in a 33 rpm LP version as well as in a set of four (7-inch) 45 rpm discs. In 1987, five previously unreleased tracks recorded at the same original sessions were added as bonus tracks to the Capitol Records CD re-release, titled The Complete After Midnight Sessions. Some later re-issues, under the title After Midnight, The Complete Session or simply After Midnight, also include one or more alternate take(s) with the 17 songs from the original 1956 recording sessions. There are also at least three other reissues with 18, 19 and 21 tracks.

== Track listing ==
=== LP release ===
LP side A:

1. "Just You, Just Me" (Greer, Raymond Klages) – 3:00
2. "Sweet Lorraine" (Burwell, Parish) – 4:33
3. "Sometimes I'm Happy" (Caesar, Youmans) – 4:11
4. "Caravan" (Ellington, Mills, Tizol) – 2:45
5. "It's Only a Paper Moon" (Arlen, Harburg, Rose) – 3:06
6. "You're Looking at Me" (Troup) – 4:12

LP side B:

1. "Lonely One" (Hambro, Roberta Heller) – 3:45
2. "Don't Let It Go to Your Head" (Henry Hadamik, Frank LaVere, Bob Nast) – 3:11
3. "I Know That You Know" (Youmans, Caldwell) – 2:28
4. "Blame It on My Youth" (Levant, Heyman) – 4:06
5. "When I Grow Too Old to Dream" (Hammerstein, Romberg) – 4:33
6. "(Get Your Kicks on) Route 66" (Troup) – 3:41

A later reissue of the album did not contain "Sometimes I'm Happy (Sometimes I'm Blue)" and "When I Grow Too Old to Dream".

=== Four 7-inch 45rpm discs release ===
Disc 1

A1. "Sometimes I'm Happy (Sometimes I'm Blue)"
B1. "Just You, Just Me"
B2. "When I Grow Too Old to Dream"

Disc 2

C1. "Lonely One"
C2. "I Know That You Know"
D1. "Sweet Lorraine"

Disc 3

E1. "You're Looking At Me"
F1. "Caravan"
F2. "(Get Your Kicks on) Route 66"

Disc 4

G1. "It's Only a Paper Moon"
G2. "Don't Let It Go To Your Head"
H1. "Blame It On My Youth"

=== 1987 CD release, The Complete After Midnight Sessions ===
1. "Just You, Just Me
2. "Sweet Lorraine"
3. "Sometimes I'm Happy (Sometimes I'm Blue)"
4. "Caravan"
5. "It's Only a Paper Moon"
6. "You're Looking at Me"
7. "Lonely One"
8. "Don't Let It Go to Your Head"
9. "I Know That You Know"
10. "Blame It on My Youth"
11. "When I Grow Too Old to Dream"
12. "(Get Your Kicks on) Route 66"

Bonus tracks (taken from the same 1956 recording sessions):

13. "I Was a Little Too Lonely (And You Were a Little Too Late)" (Evans, Livingston) – 3:02
14. "You Can Depend on Me" (Carpenter, Dunlap, Hines) – 3:55
15. "What Is There to Say?" (Duke, Harburg) – 3:37
16. "Two Loves Have I" (Scotto, Barry Trivers, Jack Murray) – 2:47
17. "Candy" (Kramer, David, Whitney) – 3:54

== Personnel ==
- Nat King Cole – piano, vocals
- John Collins – guitar
- Charlie Harris – bass
- Lee Young – drums
- Willie Smith – alto saxophone on "Just You, Just Me," "You're Looking at Me", "Don't Let it Go to Your Head" and "I Was a Little Too Lonely"
- Harry Edison – trumpet on "Sweet Lorraine", "It's Only a Paper Moon", "Route 66", "You Can Depend on Me" and "Candy"
- Juan Tizol – trombone on "Caravan", "Lonely One", "Blame It on My Youth" and "What is There to Say"
- Stuff Smith – violin on "Sometimes I'm Happy", "I Know That You Know", "When I Grow Too Old to Dream" and "Two Loves Have I"
- Jack Costanzo – bongos on "Caravan" and "Lonely One"

== Charts ==
Chart performance for The Complete After Midnight Sessions
Chart (2026)	Peak position
UK Jazz & Blues Albums (Official Charts)	9

== Release information ==
- Capitol Records W-782 (33 rpm LP)
- Capitol Records EAP-782 (album of four 7-inch 45 rpm discs)
- Capitol Records CDP 7 48328 2 (1987 Compact Disc, The Complete After Midnight Sessions)
- Blue Note 20087 (1999 Compact Disc, After Midnight, the Complete Session)
- Analogue Productions CAPP 782 SA (2010 hybrid mono SACD, After Midnight)
- Analogue Productions AAPP 782–45 (2010 45 rpm 12-inch LPs (x3), After Midnight)
