= The Piano Style of Nat King Cole =

Studio album by Nat King Cole
- Released: 1956
- Recorded: June 7, 11 and August 23, 27, 1955
- Studio: Universal (Chicago)
- Genre: Jazz
- Length: 45:40
- Label: Capitol
- Producer: Lee Gillette

Nat King Cole chronology
10th Anniversary Album (1955)	The Piano Style of Nat King Cole (1956)	Ballads of the Day (1956)

Professional ratings
Review scores
Source	Rating
AllMusic	3/5 stars

The Piano Style of Nat King Cole is a 1956 studio album by Nat King Cole, with orchestra arranged and conducted by Nelson Riddle. This was Cole's last instrumental album.

== Reception ==
The Allmusic review by Lindsay Planer awarded the album three stars, and said that "Cole nimbly reels off some of his most accomplished keyboarding to date, all the while guiding the big band into a spirited musical repartee"

== Track listing ==
LP side A:

1. "Love Walked In" (George Gershwin, Ira Gershwin) - 3:27
2. "My Heart Stood Still" (Lorenz Hart, Richard Rodgers) - 1:40
3. "Imagination" (Johnny Burke, Jimmy Van Heusen) - 3:26
4. "I Never Knew" (Ted Fio Rito, Gus Kahn) - 2:33
5. "Stella by Starlight" (Ned Washington, Victor Young) - 3:47
6. "(What Can I Say) After I Say I'm Sorry?" (Walter Donaldson, Abe Lyman) - 2:25
7. "I Didn't Know What Time It Was" (Hart, Rodgers) - 3:08
8. "Taking a Chance on Love" (Vernon Duke, Ted Fetter, John Latouche) - 3:03

LP side B:

1. "April in Paris" (Duke, Yip Harburg) - 3:49
2. "I Want to Be Happy" (Irving Caesar, Vincent Youmans) - 1:45
3. "I See Your Face Before Me" (Howard Dietz, Arthur Schwartz) - 2:33
4. "Just One of Those Things" (Cole Porter) - 3:07
5. "I Get a Kick out of You" (Porter) - 2:39
6. "If I Could Be with You (One Hour Tonight)" (Henry Creamer, James P. Johnson) - 2:39
7. "I Hear Music" (Burton Lane, Frank Loesser) - 3:03
8. "Tea for Two" (Caesar, Youmans) - 2:31

Bonus track on later CD re-issue:

17. "My Heart Stood Still" (Hart, Rodgers) - 2:42 (alternate take)

== Personnel ==
- Nat King Cole - piano
- Nelson Riddle - arranger, conductor
