= Nat King Cole Sings/George Shearing Plays =

Studio album by Nat King Cole
- Released: 1962 (original); 1987 (re-issue with three bonus tracks)
- Recorded: 19–22 December 1961
- Studio: Capitol (Hollywood)
- Genre: Vocal jazz
- Length: 46:41
- Label: Capitol
- Producer: Lee Gillette

Nat King Cole chronology
The Touch of Your Lips (1961)	Nat King Cole Sings/George Shearing Plays (1962)	Ramblin' Rose (1962)

Professional ratings
Review scores
Source	Rating
AllMusic	4/5 stars
The Rolling Stone Jazz Record Guide	2/5 stars
The Encyclopedia of Popular Music	4/5 stars

Nat King Cole Sings/George Shearing Plays is a 1962 studio album by Nat King Cole, featuring the pianist George Shearing. Containing new arrangements of two songs that Nat King Cole made famous in earlier versions: "I'm Lost" and "Lost April". The album peaked at No. 27 on the Billboard albums chart.

== Track listing ==
No.	Title	Writer(s)	Length
1.	"September Song"	Maxwell Anderson, Kurt Weill	2:59
2.	"Pick Yourself Up"	Dorothy Fields, Jerome Kern	3:11
3.	"I Got It Bad (and That Ain't Good)"	Duke Ellington, Paul Francis Webster	3:42
4.	"Let There Be Love"	Ian Grant, Lionel Rand	2:45
5.	"Azure-Te"	Bill Davis, Don Wolf	3:55
6.	"Lost April"	Eddie DeLange, Emil Newman, Hubert Spencer	3:20
7.	"(The End of) A Beautiful Friendship"	Donald Kahn, Stanley Styne	2:41
8.	"Fly Me to the Moon"	Bart Howard	3:31
9.	"Serenata"	Leroy Anderson, Mitchell Parish	3:02
10.	"I'm Lost"	Otis René	3:29
11.	"There's a Lull in My Life"	Mack Gordon, Harry Revel	2:25
12.	"Don't Go"	Al Stillman, Guy Wood	2:32
13.	"Everything Happens to Me"	Tom Adair, Matt Dennis	3:20
14.	"The Game of Love"	Armando Peraza, Milt Raskin	2:58
15.	"Guess I'll Go Back Home (This Summer)"	Ray Mayer, Willard Robison	2:51
Total length:			46:41

== Personnel ==
- Nat King Cole – vocals
- George Shearing – piano, arranger
- Ralph Carmichael – arranger, conductor

Orchestra members

- Vibes: Emil Richards (5–15), Warren Chiasson (5–15)
- Guitar: Al Hendrickson (5–15)
- Bass played by: Israel Crosby (5–15), Al McKibbon (5–15)
- Arco bass: Mike Rubin (5–15)
- Drums: Shelly Manne (5–15), Vernell Fournier (5–15)
- Congas: Armando Peraza (5–15), Carlos Vidal (8–9, 14–15)
- Additional percussion: Nick Martinis (8–9, 14–15), Luis Miranda (8–9, 14–15)
- Trombone: Lloyd Ullate (8–9, 14–15)
- Reeds: Paul Horn (8–9, 14–15), Justin Gordon (8–9, 14–15), Willie Schwartz (8–9, 14–15)
