= To the Ends of the Earth (song) =

1956 song by Nat King Cole

Single by Nat King Cole
- A-side: "Night Lights"
- Released: October 23, 1956
- Genre: Traditional pop
- Length: 2:16
- Label: Capitol
- Songwriters: Joe Sherman; Noel Sherman

Nat King Cole singles chronology
"That's All There Is to That" (1956)	"To the Ends of the Earth" (1956)	"The Christmas Song (Merry Christmas to You)" (1956)

"To the Ends of the Earth" is a 1956 Nat King Cole song, written by Noel Sherman and Joe Sherman. It was released as a single in 1956 and reached number 25 on the pop charts. The song was reissued on the album This Is Nat King Cole (1957), and again on The Nat King Cole Story (1961).

== Versions ==
The song was covered by Marvin Gaye on his album A Tribute to the Great Nat King Cole (1965), Tony Middleton (1966), and Engelbert Humperdinck on his 1967 album The Last Waltz and by Johnny Mathis on Mathis Magic (1979), again with Cole's daughter Natalie Cole on Mathis' Unforgettable – A Musical Tribute to Nat King Cole (1983), and others including Cole's younger brother Freddy Cole. The American blues artist Gary Clark Jr. covered the song under the title "To the End of the Earth" on his album JPEG Raw (2024).
