= Horace Logan =

American musician

- Born: Horace Lee Logan, Jr. August 3, 1916; Mer Rouge, Louisiana, U.S.
- Died: October 13, 2002 (aged 86); Victoria, Texas, U.S.
- Other names: "Hoss"
- Occupation: Radio Personality
- Known for: Louisiana Hayride

Horace Lee Logan Jr. (August 3, 1916 – October 13, 2002), known as Hoss Logan, was the program director for the Louisiana Hayride in Shreveport, Louisiana, which showcased country music singing stars in the 1950s. He originated the catch-phrase "Elvis has left the building."

== Career ==
Born in Mer Rouge in Morehouse Parish in northeastern Louisiana, Logan grew up in nearby Monroe. He began his broadcasting career in 1932 when he was sixteen, having won a contest to become a disc jockey at KWKH in Shreveport. He served in the United States Army from 1942 to 1945 during World War II and upon his return to Louisiana opened a gun repair shop.

In 1947, Logan became program director for KWKH. In 1948, he started booking talent for a new weekly music show called the Louisiana Hayride before a live studio audience at the Shreveport Municipal Memorial Auditorium and broadcast nationally over the CBS Radio network. Logan organized the program with performer rotation, audience participation, and multiple announcers to maintain a tight pace.

The Louisiana Hayride became known as the "Cradle of the Stars" launching the careers of Hank Williams, Slim Whitman, Johnny Cash, and Elvis Presley. Presley performed on the radio version of the program in 1954 and made his first appearance on television on March 3, 1955, in a condensed version of the Louisiana Hayride. Logan first used the phrase "Elvis has left the building" in December 1956 to convince overexcited fans to calm down after Presley performed. It has since become a catchphrase and punchline.

After Logan left "The Hayride," he worked in California and Florida and spent a decade in the Dallas–Fort Worth Metroplex, where he was the producer of Big D Jamboree, which featured among others Willie Nelson.
