= Lost April =

Song
- Released: 1947
- Genre: Ballad
- Composers: Emil Newman and Herbert W. Spencer
- Lyricist: Edgar DeLange or Edgar Leslie

"Lost April" is a popular song by Emil Newman and Herbert W. Spencer, with lyrics by Eddie DeLange or Edgar Leslie. It is a romantic, melancholy piece that represents lost love, nostalgia, and missed opportunities. Written for the film The Bishop's Wife (1947), starring Cary Grant and Loretta Young, it signifies Mrs. Hamilton's emotionally distant marriage and sentimental yearning, and appears on the soundtrack as "Mrs. Hamilton & Lost April".

Singer Nat King Cole liked this movie theme, and "Lost April" became the first of his many songs tied to films. He planned the studio recording in November 1947 and, upon request, recorded a take with his jazz trio on November 29. He then planned to add a string section, as he and talent manager Carlos Gastel had done to one of his earlier hits, "The Christmas Song", and recorded Pete Rugolo's big-band-and-strings arrangement in New York City on December 20. This latter recording was strategically timed before the film's wide release and the American Federation of Musicians' 1948 strike, which was expected (Note: Under the Taft–Hartley Act (1947), the labor union had to announce their plan for the January 1, 1948 strike, unlike their surprise 1942–1944 musicians' strike.) to limit releases of similarly arranged songs.

Frankie Carle and his orchestra recorded the song in 1948, with vocals by Gregg Lawrence.

Cole recorded Lost April again in 1961, with the George Shearing Quintet, for the album Nat King Cole Sings/George Shearing Plays, released in 1962.

Since its release, Lost April recorded by many other artists, including Bev Kelly, John Pizzarelli, Francie Zucco, and April Varner. Tweet sampled a Cole recording in the song "Turn da Lights Off" (2005).

== Reception ==
Music industry leader James "Jim" B. Conkling predicted Cole's December 1947 recording would be a hit and told Cole that Capitol Records would release it as a single with "Nature Boy" on the B-side. After its March 1948 release on Capitol disc 15054, "Nature Boy" instead proved to be among the biggest hits that year. That August, Cole told Metronome's Barbara Hodgkins that he preferred "Lost April", but he also praised creative risk-taking and credited "Nature Boy"'s success to its novelty.

== Bibliography ==
- Cole, Maria; Robinson, Louie (1971). Nat King Cole: An Intimate Biography. New York: William Morrow and Company. ISBN 978-0-688-02153-5.
- Friedwald, Will (2020). Straighten Up and Fly Right: The Life and Music of Nat King Cole. Oxford: Oxford University Press. ISBN 978-0-19-088204-4.
- Lysy, Craig (2023-06-12). "[Review:] The Bishop's Wife – Hugo Friedhofer". Movie Music UK: Film Score Reviews by Jonathan Broxton since 1997. Archived from the original on 2023-06-17.
- Trias, Mike (14 January 2005). "Poised for Stardom" (PDF). Radio & Records. ISSN 0277-4860. Archived from the original (PDF) on 2025-06-05.
