= Elvis has left the building =

Catchphrase

"Elvis has left the building" is a phrase that was often used by public address announcers at the conclusion of Elvis Presley concerts in order to disperse audiences who lingered in hopes of an encore. It has since become a catchphrase and punchline.

== Origin ==
The phrase was first used by promoter Horace Logan on December 15, 1956, at the end of Elvis’s last appearance on Louisiana Hayride. In order to accommodate a larger crowd the show was moved from the Municipal Memorial Auditorium in Shreveport, Louisiana, to the then-new Hirsch Memorial Coliseum on the grounds of the Louisiana State Fair. Presley had appeared in the middle of the night's lineup, and Logan needed to quiet the audience so that the remaining performers could play. The full quotation was:

All right, Elvis has left the building. I've told you absolutely straight up to this point. You know that. He has left the building. He left the stage and went out the back with the policemen and he is now gone from the building.

"Elvis has left the building" is also heard at the end of Presley's March 1961 Pearl Harbor Memorial benefit concert, after he exits at the end of "Hound Dog" and a short coda from the band.

Throughout the 1970s, the phrase was captured on record several times, spoken by Al Dvorin. In later years the phrase would be spoken by some of Presley's backup singers to calm down the audience after concerts.

== In popular culture ==
The phrase has since become a catchphrase and punchline, used to refer to anyone who has exited in some sense (even death). For instance, it might be used when someone makes a dramatic exit from an argument, to relieve tension among those who remain. Baseball broadcasters on radio or television sometimes use the phrase as a humorous way to describe a home run, which is typically hit over the outfield fence, leaving the field of play. Other examples or variants include:

- Former Pittsburgh Penguins hockey hall-of-fame broadcaster Mike Lange used the phrase after Penguins home game wins.
- In the early part of his original heel run, WWE wrestler Shawn Michaels's departure from the arena during live events would be announced as "The Heartbreak Kid Shawn Michaels has left the building."
- "Elvis Has Just Left the Building" is a song by Frank Zappa, first released in 1988 on Broadway the Hard Way.
- Australian Football League commentator Dennis Cometti reversed the phrase while commentating on a skirmish between Paul Salmon and Nicky Elvis Winmar: "Just as Winmar landed, big Salmon came crashing down on top of him. They're slowly getting up, and now I can report the building has left the Elvis."
- A bonus with this name in the video game GTA 2, where the player must kill Presley lookalikes moving through the streets in a single line in less than 5 seconds to get it (the phrase is then spoken, as well as visible on the screen).
- American rapper Tyler, the Creator spoke the phrase on the track "Window" in his first studio album Goblin, before sounds of gunshots and screaming could be heard in the background.
- In the Dire Straits song "Calling Elvis", Mark Knopfler sings "Did he leave the building" making a reference to this announcement.
- In the video game God Hand, after defeating Elvis a final time, Belze can be heard saying the phrase.

== See also ==
- Cultural impact of Elvis Presley
- That's all there is, there isn't any more
