= That's All There Is to That =

Single by Nat King Cole
- B-side: "My Dream Sonata"
- Released: June 1956
- Recorded: 30 December 1955
- Studio: Capitol, 5515 Melrose Ave, Hollywood
- Genre: Traditional pop
- Length: 2:20
- Label: Capitol
- Songwriters: Clyde Otis, Kelly Owens

Nat King Cole singles chronology
"Too Young to Go Steady" (1956)	"That's All There Is to That" (1956)	"Night Lights"/"To the Ends of the Earth" (1956)

"That's All There Is to That" is a song written by Clyde Otis and Kelly Owens and performed by Nat King Cole featuring The Four Knights. It reached #15 on the U.S. R&B chart and #16 on the U.S. pop chart in 1956. The song reference's Ethel Barrymore's phrase to rebuff curtain calls, "That's all there is, there isn't any more".

The single's B-side, "My Dream Sonata" reached #59 on the U.S. pop chart in 1956.

== Other versions ==
- Dinah Shore released a version of the song as the B-side to her 1955 single "Stolen Love".
- Dinah Washington released a version of the song on her 1959 album What a Diff'rence a Day Makes!
- Etta Jones released a version of the song as a single in 1962, but it did not chart.
- Hank Thompson and His Brazos Valley Boys released a version of the song on their 1965 album Breakin' in Another Heart.
