= Graduation Day (song) =

"Graduation Day" is a song composed by Joe Sherman with lyrics by his brother Noel Sherman, and was originally a 1956 hit song by the Four Freshmen.

== Four Freshman version ==
"Graduation Day"

Single by the Four Freshmen

from the album Freshman Favorites
- B-side: "Lonely Night in Paris"
- Released: April 1956
- Genre: Jazz, vocal pop
- Length: 3:01
- Label: Capitol
- Composer: Joe Sherman
- Lyricist: Noel Sherman

The Four Freshmen singles chronology
"Angel Eyes" (1956)	"Graduation Day" (1956)	"He Who Loves and Runs Away" (1956)

=== Background ===
The song is about nostalgia and was an important influence in the early rock era.

=== Chart performance ===
In the US, the Four Freshmen recording reached number 27 on the Best Sellers in Stores chart.

== The Rover Boys version ==
"Graduation Day"

Song by The Rover Boys Featuring Billy Albert
- A-side: "Graduation Day"
- B-side: "I Hear Music"
- Released: 1956
- Length: 2:38
- Label: Paramount 45-9700
- Songwriter: Sherman-Sherman

US chronology
"16 Teens" (1956)	"Graduation Day" (1956)	"From A School Ring to a Wedding Ring" (1956)

in 1956. The version by the Canadian vocal group The Rover Boys (named after the popular college-themed literary characters) recorded a version of "Graduation Day".

=== Chart performance ===
The Rover Boys' version reached number 16 on the U.S. charts.

== Other versions ==
- Bobby Pickett released his own version of the song in 1963. The A side "The Humpty Dumpty" was a Billboard Pop Spotlight for the week of 25 May. The reviewer wrote that the B side ("Graduation Day") was a serious rendition of a ballad hit of some time back. "Graduation Day" eventually made it to No. 88 on the Billboard Hot 100 for the week of 29 June.
- The song was a concert staple of the Beach Boys, who were deeply influenced by the Four Freshmen. A recording of it was featured on the live Capitol Records album Beach Boys Concert (1964), and a studio version was included as a bonus track on the 1990 Today! & Summer Days (And Summer Nights!!) compilation CD.
- In 1967, The Arbors recorded their version and included on their The Arbors Sing Valley of the Dolls LP.
