= The Touch of Your Lips (Nat King Cole album) =

Studio album by Nat King Cole
- Released: April 1961
- Recorded: December 21, 22, 23, 1960
- Studio: Capitol (Hollywood)
- Genre: Vocal jazz
- Length: 40:48
- Label: Capitol
- Producer: Lee Gillette

Nat King Cole chronology
The Nat King Cole Story (1961)	The Touch of Your Lips (1961)	Nat King Cole Sings/George Shearing Plays (1962)

Professional ratings
Review scores
Source	Rating
Allmusic	3/5 stars
The Encyclopedia of Popular Music	4/5 stars

The Touch of Your Lips is a 1961 album by Nat King Cole, arranged by Ralph Carmichael. It reached No. 79 on the Billboard 150 Best Selling Monoraul LP's.

== Track listing ==
1. "The Touch of Your Lips" (Ray Noble) – 3:52
2. "I Remember You" (Johnny Mercer, Victor Schertzinger) – 3:13
3. "Illusion" (Barry Iver, Lillian Moss, Sol Parker) – 2:54
4. "You're Mine, You!" (Johnny Green, Edward Heyman) – 3:22
5. "Funny (Not Much)" (Hughie Prince, Robert Merrill, Marcia Neil, Philip Broughton) – 3:05
6. "Poinciana (Song of the Tree)" (Nat Simon, Buddy Bernier) – 3:56
7. "Sunday, Monday, or Always" (Jimmy Van Heusen, Johnny Burke) – 2:21
8. "Not So Long Ago" (Al Frisch, Charles Tobias) – 4:07
9. "A Nightingale Sang in Berkeley Square" (Eric Maschwitz, Manning Sherwin) – 4:46
10. "Only Forever" (James V. Monaco, Johnny Burke) – 3:19
11. "My Need for You" (Al Frisch, Allan Roberts) – 3:24
12. "Lights Out" (Billy Hill) – 2:29

== Personnel ==
- Nat King Cole – vocal
- Ralph Carmichael – arranger, conductor
