= Juke Box Baby =

Single by Perry Como
- A-side: "Hot Diggity (Dog Ziggity Boom)"
- Released: February 1956
- Recorded: February 2, 1956
- Genre: Pop
- Length: 2:21
- Label: RCA Victor
- Songwriter(s): Joe Sherman, Noel Sherman

Perry Como singles chronology
"(There's No Place Like (Home for the Holidays)" (1955)	"Juke Box Baby" (1956)	"More" (1956)

"Juke Box Baby" is a song written by Joe Sherman and Noel Sherman and performed by Perry Como. It reached #10 on the U.S. pop chart and #22 on the UK Singles Chart in 1956.

== Background ==
The single features The Ray Charles Singers and Mitchell Ayres and His Orchestra and was arranged by Joe Reisman.

== Other versions ==
- Sid Phillips and His Band released a version of the song as a single in the UK in 1956, but it did not chart.
