= Hildegarde =

American cabaret singer (1906–2005)

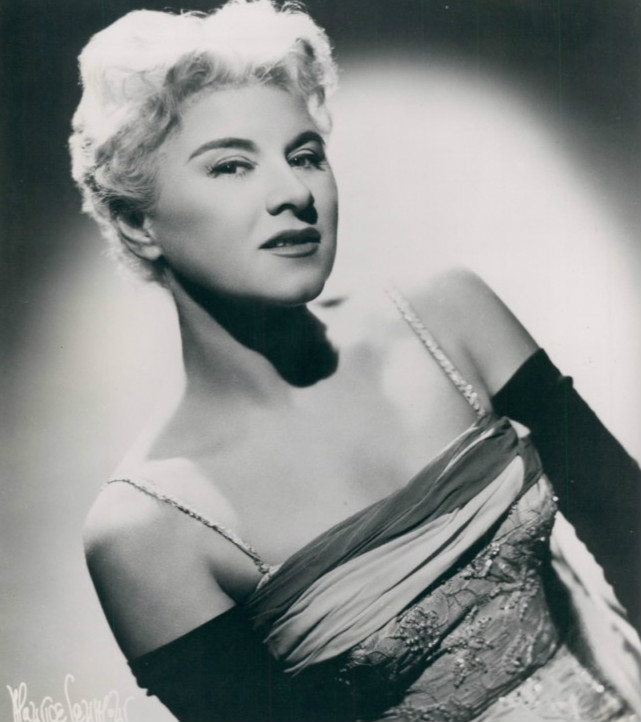
- Hildegarde in 1960

Background information
- Also known as: Hildegarde
- Born: Hildegarde Loretta Sell; February 1, 1906; Adell, Wisconsin, US
- Died: July 29, 2005 (aged 99) Manhattan, New York, US
- Genres: Cabaret; easy listening; jazz standards
- Occupations: entertainer, singer and piano player
- Years active: 1920s–1990s
- Labels: Columbia (London), Decca Records

Hildegarde Loretta Sell, known as Hildegarde (February 1, 1906 – July 29, 2005) was an American cabaret entertainer, singer and piano player. At the peak of her career, Hildegarde was popular for her international appearances and recordings on the radio, on television and in supper club shows.

During much of her career, her talents were appreciated in the cabaret setting, where her fashionable appearance, theatrical gestures, and carefully designed lighting created a distinctive stage persona. Hildegarde performed her songs with sensitivity, her warm voice preserved through many recordings. Elements of her performance legacy, including sheet music and signature accessories, are held at the Smithsonian Institution and other cultural archives.

Hildegarde has been credited with starting the use of a single name for entertainers. In 1939 she was featured on the cover of Life and in Time magazine. By the end of the 1940s, Hildegarde had become the world’s best-paid cabaret vocalist, reportedly earning $150,000 a year. During the Truman and Eisenhower presidencies, she was invited to perform at the White House. In 1960, Hildegarde was honored as a radio star on the Hollywood Walk of Fame.

Among her many popular songs, Hildegarde became known for the song "Darling, Je Vous Aime Beaucoup". After a career spanning almost 70 years from the 1920s into the 1990s, she died at age 99 in Manhattan.

== Early life ==
Hildegarde was born Hildegarde Loretta Sell in Adell, Wisconsin, and raised in New Holstein, Wisconsin, as a Roman Catholic in a musical family of German background. Along with her two sisters, Hildegarde sang in their school choir and performed in the school orchestra. She trained at Marquette University's College of Music in Milwaukee in the early 1920s, aspiring to become a concert pianist. Hildegarde started performing at age 16 in an all-male orchestra accompanying silent movies at the Merril Theater in Milwaukee and worked for other vaudeville acts.

== International career ==
During the Truman and Eisenhower presidencies, she performed at the White House. By the end of the 1940s, Hildegarde had become the world’s best-paid cabaret vocalist, reportedly earning $150,000 a year, and she continued to appear frequently at New York nightclubs throughout the following decade. Investments and work in advertising gave her a comfortable income even after musical tastes changed through the rise of rock and pop music.

=== 1930s and 1940s ===
In 1932, while living in a boarding house in New Jersey, Hildegarde became friends with the proprietor’s daughter, Anna Sosenko, who was embarking on a career as songwriter and became her manager. Hildegarde performed in the revue "Stars on Parade" of impresario Gus Edwards and followed his advice of only using her first name in show business. After other engagements in New York City, she and Sosenko traveled to London, where Hildegarde performed for one month in 1933 at the Café de Paris, a fashionable supper club. She further developed her stage act in Paris, having learned to sing in French, German, and other European languages, cultivating an image of cosmopolitan sophistication. This led to nightclub reviewers doubting "whether she was an American with a French accent or French with an American accent." Hildegarde later secured prominent engagements in London, appearing at events such as the Jubilee celebrations of George V and the coronation of George VI. She also performed extensively for the BBC, making her the first American vocalist to obtain such a commitment.

In the 1930s and 1940s, Hildegarde appeared in cabarets and supper clubs for up to 45 weeks a year. Her records sold in the hundreds of thousands, and her admirers ranged from soldiers during World War II to King Gustaf VI Adolf of Sweden and the Duke of Windsor. On some of her recordings, she was accompanied by band leader Carroll Gibbons. During the 1940s she appeared on Raleigh Room, an NBC Radio program.

In the late 1940s, Hildegarde performed on a tour across Europe. A practising catholic, she was received by Pope Pius XII at his summer residence, Castel Gandolfo. She frequently appeared at benefit events supporting hospitals, schools, and churches. For her appearances, she wore elegant gowns and long gloves, even when playing the piano: "Miss Piggy stole the gloves idea from me.", she once said. A noted flirt, Hildegarde told risqué anecdotes while giving long-stemmed roses to men in the audience.

Her song "Darling, Je Vous Aime Beaucoup" was introduced in the 1937 film Love and Hisses. The French words in the title, meaning "Darling, I love you very much.", are used as a refrain. It reached # 21 in the 1943 charts and became her signature song. Some of her other well-known titles were the German war-time song "Lili Marleen", sung in English in a very different way from the other famous version by Marlene Dietrich. More of her popular songs were Jerome Kern and Oscar Hammerstein's "The Last Time I Saw Paris" and Noël Coward's "I'll See You Again". Before World War II, she was among the first entertainers to make appearances on television. After returning to the United States, she signed a recording contract with Decca, which produced several commercially successful releases, among them an album featuring six songs by Vernon Duke.

=== Later years ===
From the 1950s through the 1970s, alongside her cabaret work and recording career, Hildegarde appeared in television specials and toured with the national company of Stephen Sondheim’s musical Follies. Starting on September 28, 1954, she was acting in The Blue Angel TV series. In 1964, she performed a song for the unsuccessful presidential nomination campaign for Margaret Chase Smith; the song was called "Leave It to the Girls", and was written by Gladys Shelley.

For her 80th birthday on February 1, 1986, she was honored with a sold-out concert at Carnegie Hall. In 1997 Annie Leibovitz photographed the 91-year-old Hildegarde at her Turtle Bay home for Vanity Fair magazine. In the accompanying text, socialite Richard Merkin called her "the quintessential cabaret performer since shortly after the piano was invented". Along with Julie Wilson, Lena Horne, and Eartha Kitt, Hildegarde was featured as one of "four legendary cabaret stars [who] have defied time and age to light the New York night."

== Personal life and death ==
Hildegarde never married, although she said, "I traveled all my life, met a lot of men, had a lot of romances, but it never worked out. It was always 'hello and goodbye'". For 23 years, she was the business partner, close friend and lover of Anna Sosenko. The pair collected art, including works by French impressionists. That collection was sold when they separated in 1955 due to personal and financial differences. They reconciled late in life and even performed together again.

In her 2018 book The Incomparable Hildegarde: The Sexuality, Style and Image of an Entertainment Icon, author Monica S. Gallamore discussed the romantic affair of Hildegarde and Sosenko and affirmed that they lived in a same-sex relationship. In addition, Gallamore wrote that after their respective deaths, they had been "embraced by the LGBT community as being the first openly lesbian couple."

Hildegarde died at the age of 99 in a Manhattan hospital on July 29, 2005, of natural causes.

== Reception ==
For most of her career she was known as The Incomparable Hildegarde, a title attributed to her by columnist Walter Winchell. Eleanor Roosevelt reportedly called her the "Queen of the Supper Clubs". A portrait of Hildegarde appeared on the cover of Life magazine in 1939, adding to her popularity. The same year, Time magazine referred to her as a "luscious, hazel-eyed Milwaukee blonde who sings the way Garbo looks".

In 1960, Hildegarde was honored as a radio star on the Hollywood Walk of Fame. Her autobiography, Over 50... so What!, was published by Doubleday in 1963. In 2012, a PhD thesis about Hildegarde's life was submitted by Monica S. Gallamore at Marquette University and was later published as a book. Summarizing Hildegarde's career and her place in public memory, Gallamore wrote:

Her career encompassed most of the twentieth-century. She participated in some manner in all of the major changes in American entertainment and popular culture including the rise of radio and the dawn of television. [...] During the height of her popularity, she was one of the most respected and loved entertainers in the United States, so much so that Eleanor Roosevelt reportedly proclaimed her the "Queen of the Supper-Clubs". Yet in spite of this, her legacy became lost in the American memory.

— Monica S. Gallamore, Introducing the Incomparable Hildegarde: The Sexuality, Style, and Image of a Forgotten Cultural Icon

=== Archives ===
Hildegarde's diaries, correspondence, photographs, recordings, memorabilia, an autograph book, and 49 scrapbooks have been collected by the Raynor Library of Marquette University. The New York Public Library for the Performing Arts has general correspondence (notable correspondents including Tallulah Bankhead, Jerome Kern, Fannie Hurst, Errol Flynn, John Steinbeck), newspaper clippings, publicity materials and scrapbooks.

The National Museum of American History holds sheet music for the song “Peace and Harmony” that was part of Hildegarde’s own music collection. It features her photograph on the cover and, along with one of her white handkerchiefs, was a gift from Hildegarde to the museum. The digital collections at Mount Mary University's fashion archive hold actual garments worn by Hildegarde, including robes by designers George Stavropoulos, Halston, Marie-Louise Bruyère and Sorelle Fontana, as well as detailed catalog records and images.
