= Mary Jo Chelette =

American singer-songwriter

- Born: May 13, 1939
- Died: May 14, 1984 (aged 45)
- Genre: Country
- Occupation: Singer
- Years active: early 1950s - mid 1960s
- Formerly of: Chelette Sisters

Mary Jo Chelette (May 13, 1939 – May 14, 1984) was an American country singer from Port Arthur, Texas. Along with her two younger sisters she was billed as The Chelette Sisters and was a featured performer on radio station KPAC and later The Louisiana Hayride. As a solo performer, she has the unique distinction of being the first artist to release a record for Starday Records. Her first recording session took place at the ACA studios in Houston on May 21, 1953. Starday single #101 was "Gee, It's Tough to Be Thirteen" with "Cat Fishing" on the opposite side. Billboard reviews for this disc were neutral to unfavorable. She went on to release several more solo singles for Starday including a third answer to the song to Mexican Joe which received much-improved reviews.

Mary Jo Chelette and the Chelette Sisters were managed by Neva Starns, wife of Starday co-founder Jack Starns. The Starns created a radio program called "Houston Hometown Jamboree" to showcase Starday talent, and Mary Jo and the Chelette Sisters (who did not record for Starday) were featured on the program. By the end of 1953 she was making fifteen personal appearances a month.

On November 25, 1955 the Chelette Sisters appeared with a young Elvis Presley, equally billed with him in a Louisiana Hayride benefit concert for the Port Acres fire department.

Label-mate Patsy Ehsire recalls being "a little bit jealous" of Mary Jo Chelette, because of her physical appearance, including striking red hair, and the matching white Western outfits worn by the Chelette Sisters. Elshire commented positively about Chelette's personality.

She married William Harvey Campbell.
