= That's all there is, there isn't any more =

Phrase rebuffing curtain calls by Ethel Barrymore

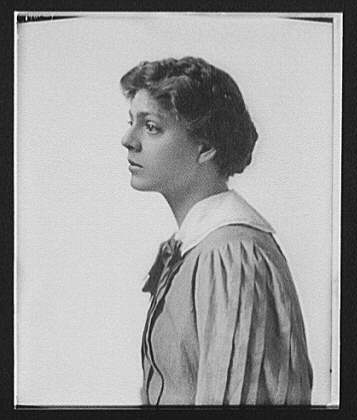
Ethel Barrymore in 1904, the year she originated the phrase

"That's all there is, there isn't any more" was a phrase Ethel Barrymore used to rebuff curtain calls. The line entered the national consciousness of the United States in the 1920s and 1930s and has often been referenced and parodied.

== Origins ==
According to entertainment columnist Sidney Skolsky in March 1931, the line comes from a play Barrymore starred in, Thomas Raceward's Sunday, which opened at New York's Hudson Theatre on November 15, 1904. Barrymore portrayed an eastern girl on a western ranch. During one scene, she read a letter from home, and her line upon finishing a reading of the letter was "That's all there is—there isn't any more". Barrymore would use the line after the play to quiet the thunderous applause beckoning her to do a curtain call. The phrase, which typified Ethel's blunt humor and distaste for attention, became a part of the national language. Ethel herself would parody it in a 1949 Christmas broadcast on Bing Crosby's radio show, though she couldn't finish the line reading without erupting into laughter. Ethel Barrymore's last words were reportedly "Is everybody happy? I know I'm happy. That's all there is, there isn't any more".

== References in popular culture ==
The phrase has been parodied and referenced frequently. In theatre it was most famously quoted in George S. Kaufman and Edna Ferber's The Royal Family, a comedy satirizing the Barrymore family. Examples of film references include the 1933 pre-code Sons of the Desert, where it is quoted by Oliver Hardy.

In literature it was the closing line for every book in the children's series Madeline, and it would become the franchise's most famous phrase.

References in music include Nat King Cole's "That's All There Is to That" and Judy Garland's "That's All There Is, There Isn't Any More". Bruce Springsteen was also known to say variations of the lines during his lengthy, concert-ending performances of Gary U.S. Bonds's song "Quarter to Three" on the Darkness Tour in 1978. In 2005's King Kong, Naomi Watts's character Ann Darrow uses the phrase when she becomes exhausted from Kong's insistence that she continue performing vaudeville tricks to entertain him. Most recently, in the 2017 video game Cuphead—which stylistically emulates the 1930s cartoons and generally maintains the 30s aesthetics—the final song playing over the credits ends with the famous phrase, seconds later followed by "...or is there?" and a sinister laugh.

== See also ==
- Lionel Barrymore
- John Barrymore
- Is That All There Is?
- Yogiism
- Elvis has left the building
