= The Magic of Christmas (Nat King Cole album) =

Studio album by Nat King Cole
- Released: 1960
- Recorded: July 5–7, 1960
- Studio: Capitol (Hollywood)
- Genre: Christmas music
- Length: 29:45 (original 1960 release); 31:47 (1962 rerelease)
- Label: Capitol
- Producer: Lee Gillette

Nat King Cole chronology
Wild Is Love (1960)	The Magic of Christmas (1960)	The Nat King Cole Story (1961)

Professional ratings
Review scores
Source	Rating
AllMusic	4.5/5 stars
The Encyclopedia of Popular Music	2/5 stars

The Magic of Christmas is a 1960 album by Nat King Cole, arranged and conducted by Ralph Carmichael.

This was Cole's only complete album of Christmas songs, although he had recorded several holiday singles earlier in his career. One of these, "The Christmas Song", originally recorded in 1946, was re-recorded for the 1961 album The Nat King Cole Story.

It is the best-selling Christmas album released in the 1960s, and was certified by the RIAA for shipments of 6 million copies in the U.S. The album was reissued in 1962 as The Christmas Song, with the title track added as the leadoff to Side 1 and "God Rest Ye Merry, Gentlemen" omitted. The 1962 version reached number 1 on Billboard's Christmas Albums chart and remained for two weeks.

== Track listing ==
=== Original 1960 release ===
Side One
No.	Title	Writer(s)	Length
1.	"Deck the Hall"	Traditional English	1:09
2.	"Adeste Fideles^{[a]}"	John Francis Wade	2:28
3.	"God Rest Ye Merry, Gentlemen"	Traditional English	1:29
4.	"O Tannenbaum"	Ernst Anschütz	3:01
5.	"O, Little Town of Bethlehem"	Phillip Brooks; Lewis Redner	2:20
6.	"I Saw Three Ships"	Traditional English	1:28
7.	"O Holy Night"	Adolphe Adam; John Sullivan Dwight	2:57
Total length:			17:14

Side Two
No.	Title	Writer(s)	Length
8.	"Hark, the Herald Angels Sing"	Felix Mendelssohn; Charles Wesley	1:50
9.	"A Cradle in Bethlehem^{[b]}"	Alfred Bryan; Larry Stock	3:25
10.	"Away in a Manger"	Traditional English	2:01
11.	"Joy to the World"	Lowell Mason; Isaac Watts	1:25
12.	"The First Noel"	William B. Sandys	1:58
13.	"Caroling, Caroling^{[b]}"	Alfred Burt; Wihla Hutson	2:02
14.	"Silent Night"	Franz Gruber; Josef Mohr	2:12
Total length:			14:53

=== 1962 rerelease ===
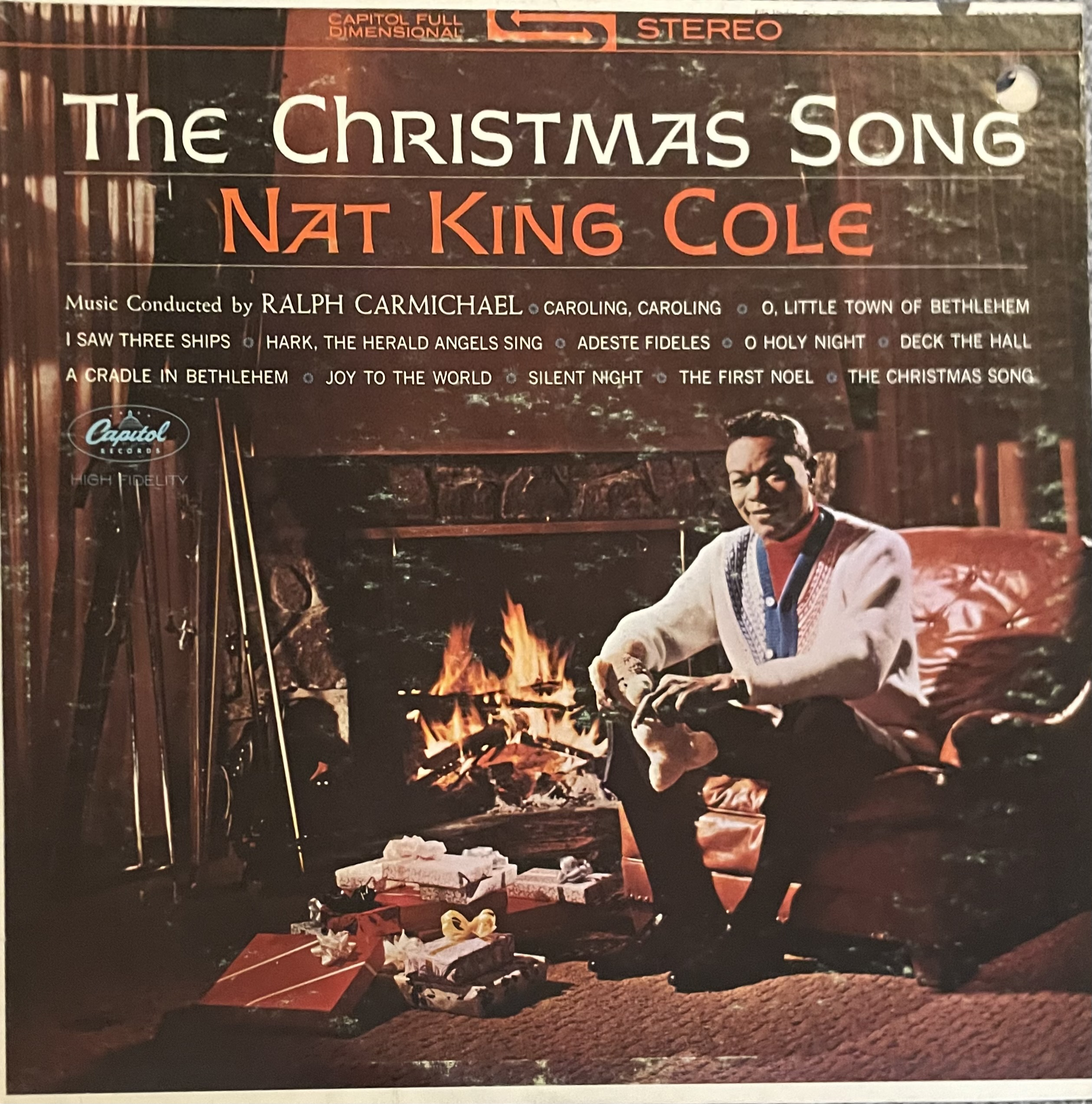
1962 Rerelease Album Cover

No.	Title	Writer(s)	Length
1.	"The Christmas Song ^{[c]}"	Mel Tormé; Robert Wells	3:31
Total length:			31:47

Notes

- ^{^[a]}An alternate, all-English performance of "O, Come All Ye Faithful" was recorded during the album sessions and first released in 1990 on the compilation album Cole, Christmas, & Kids.
- ^{^[b]}All tracks, save for "A Cradle in Bethlehem" and "Caroling, Caroling", are credited on the LP label as being adapted by Nat King Cole and Edith Bergdahl.
- ^{^[c]}Previously released on The Nat King Cole Story (1961)

== The Christmas Song 1999 reissue ==
The Christmas Song cover of a 2009 reissue

In 1999 The Magic of Christmas was reissued again under the title The Christmas Song, with several added tracks including an alternate version of "The Christmas Song" with Cole's daughter, and with new cover art. This version of the album was placed at number 38 on Rolling Stone's top 65 greatest Christmas albums of all time.

No.	Title	Writer(s)	Length
1.	"Nat's Christmas Wishes"		0:16
2.	"The Christmas Song"	Mel Tormé; Robert Wells	3:14
3.	"Deck the Hall"	Traditional English	1:08
4.	"Adeste Fideles"	John Francis Wade	2:24
5.	"God Rest Ye Merry, Gentlemen"	Traditional English	1:32
6.	"O Tannenbaum"	Ernst Anschütz	3:03
7.	"O Little Town of Bethlehem"	Phillip Brooks; Lewis Redner	2:21
8.	"I Saw Three Ships"	Traditional English	1:28
9.	"O Holy Night"	Adolphe Adam; John Sullivan Dwight	3:02
10.	"Hark! The Herald Angels Sing"	Felix Mendelssohn; Charles Wesley	1:51
11.	"A Cradle in Bethlehem"	Alfred Bryan; Larry Stock	3:27
12.	"Away in a Manger"	Traditional English	2:01
13.	"Joy to the World"	Lowell Mason; Isaac Watts	1:28
14.	"The First Noel"	William B. Sandys	2:01
15.	"Caroling, Caroling"	Alfred Burt; Wihla Hutson	2:03
16.	"Silent Night"	Franz Gruber; Josef Mohr	2:11
17.	"Buon Natale (Means Merry Christmas to You) ^{[a]}" (featuring Anthony Hamilton)	Bob Saffer; Frank Linale	1:36
18.	"All I Want For Christmas (Is My Two Front Teeth)^{[a]}"	Donald Yetter Gardner	2:31
19.	"The Happiest Christmas Tree^{[a]}"	Lee Cathy	1:45
20.	"The Christmas Song" (featuring Natalie Cole)	Mel Tormé; Robert Wells	3:44
Total length:			43:00

Notes

- ^{^[a]}Previously released on Cole, Christmas, & Kids (1990).

== Personnel ==
- Nat King Cole – lead vocals
- The Ralph Carmichael Chorus – background vocals
- Ralph Carmichael – arranger, conductor

Orchestra members

- Piano: Milton Raskin
- Guitar: John Collins
- Bass played by: Lloyd Lunham
- Arco Bass: Bob Stone
- Drums: Lee Young
- Percussion: John Cyr (A3, A5, A7, B2, B6), Ralph Hansell (A1-A2, A4, B1, B4), Dale Anderson
- Harp: Kathryn Thompson
- Violins: Harold Dicterow (A3, A5, A7, B2, B6), Dave Frisina (A3, A5, A7, B2, B6), Nate Kaproff (A1-A2, A4, B1, B4), Joe Livoti (A1-A2, A4, B1, B4), Emanuel Moss (A1-A2, A4, B1, B4), Lou Raderman (A3, A5, A7, B2, B6), Isadore Roman (A1-A2, A4, B1, B4), Victor Arno, Emil Briano, James Getzoff, Alex Murray, Erno Neufield, Ralph Schaeffer, Joseph Stepansky, Jerry Vinci, Israel Baker
- Violas: Milt Thomas (A1-A2, A4, B1, B4), Alvin Dinkin (A3, A5, A7, B2, B6), Ray Menhennick (A1-A2, A4, B1, B4), Gary Nuttycombe (A3, A5, A7, B2, B6), Al Harshman, Louis Kievman
- Cellos: Dave Filerman (A3, A5, A7, B2, B6), Armand Kaproff (A1-A2, A4, B1, B4), Ed Lustgarten (A1-A2, A4, B1, B4), Emmett Sargeant, Joseph Saxon

On A1-A2, A4, B1, B4:

- Trumpet: Ray Linn, Joe Triscari, George Werth
- Trombone: Jim Henderson, Tommy Shepard, Lloyd Ullate
- Reeds: Lloyd W. Hildebrand, Jules Jacob, Harry Klee, Arthur Smith

Tracks 1, 2, 4, 8, 11,

06-July-1960 (Wednesday) - Hollywood. Capitol Tower Studio A

The Ralph Carmichael Chorus (Vocalists); Ray Linn, Joe Triscari, George Werth (tpt); James Henderson, Tom Shepard, Lloyd Ulyate (tbn); Jules Jacob, Lloyd Hildebrand, Harry Klee, Arthur Smith (wwd); Victor Arno, Israel Baker, Emil Briano, James Getzoff, Nathan Kaproff, Joseph Livoti, Emanuel Moss, Alex Murray, Erno Neufeld, Isadore Roman, Ralph Schaeffer, Joe Stepansky, Gerald Vinci (vln); Allan Harshman, Louis Kievman, Ray Menhennick, Milton Thomas (via); Armand Kaproff, Edgar Lustgarten, Emmet Sargeant, Joseph Saxon (vlc); Bob Stone (arco); Kathryn Thompson (harp); Milt Raskin (p); John Collins (g); Lloyd Lunham (b); Lee Young (d); Dale Anderson, Ralph Hansell (perc); Ralph Carmichael (arr/cond).

Tracks 3, 5, 7, 9, 13,

07-July-1960 (Thursday) - Hollywood. Capitol Tower Studio A

The Ralph Carmichael Chorus (Vocalists); Victor Arno, Israel Baker, Emil Briano, Harold Dicterow, Dave Frisina, James Getzoff, Alex Murray, Erno Neufeld, Lou Raderman, Ralph Schaeffer, Joe Stepansky, Gerald Vinci (vln); Alvin Dinkin, Allan Harshman, Louis Kievman, Gary Nuttycombe (via); Dave Filerman, Emmet Sargeant, Joseph Saxon (vlc); Bob Stone (arco); Kathryn Thompson (harp); Milt Raskin (p); John Collins (g); Lloyd Lunham (b); Lee Young (d); Dale Anderson, John Cyr (perc); Ralph Carmichael (arr/cond).

Tracks 6, 10, 12, 14,

05-July-1960 (Tuesday) - Hollywood. Capitol Tower Studio A

The Ralph Carmichael Chorus (Vocalists); Ralph Carmichael (arr/cond).

== Charts ==
=== Weekly charts ===
Weekly chart performance
Chart (1960–2025)	Peak position
Australian On Replay Albums (ARIA)	18
Austrian Albums (Ö3 Austria)	19
Belgian Albums (Ultratop Flanders)	13
Belgian Albums (Ultratop Wallonia)	23
Canadian Albums (Billboard)	3
Danish Albums (Hitlisten)	8
Dutch Albums (Album Top 100)	9
Finnish Albums (Suomen virallinen lista)	30
German Albums (Offizielle Top 100)	14
Hungarian Albums (MAHASZ)	15
Icelandic Albums (Tónlistinn)	23
Irish Albums (Official Charts)	5
Italian Albums (FIMI)	26
Japanese Hot Albums (Billboard Japan)	63
Lithuanian Albums (AGATA)	11
Norwegian Albums (VG-lista)	11
Polish Albums (ZPAV)	75
Portuguese Albums (AFP)	42
Swiss Albums (Schweizer Hitparade)	9
UK Albums (Official Charts)	22
US Billboard 200	4
US Top R&B/Hip-Hop Albums (Billboard)	1

=== Year-end charts ===
Year-end chart performance
Chart (2019)	Position
US Top R&B/Hip-Hop Albums (Billboard)	79
Chart (2020)	Position
US Billboard 200	187
US Top R&B/Hip-Hop Albums (Billboard)	71
Chart (2021)	Position
US Billboard 200	177
US Top R&B/Hip-Hop Albums (Billboard)	64
Chart (2022)	Position
US Billboard 200	179
US Top R&B/Hip-Hop Albums (Billboard)	60
Chart (2023)	Position
US Billboard 200	179
US Top R&B/Hip-Hop Albums (Billboard)	57
Chart (2024)	Position
US Billboard 200	179
US Top R&B/Hip-Hop Albums (Billboard)	51
Chart (2025)	Position
US Billboard 200	187
US Top R&B/Hip-Hop Albums (Billboard)	55

== Certifications ==
Certifications and sales
Region	Certification	Certified units/sales
Denmark (IFPI Danmark)	Platinum	20,000^{‡}
United Kingdom (BPI)	Silver	60,000^{‡}
United States (RIAA)	6× Platinum	6,000,000^{^}
^{^} Shipments figures based on certification alone.^{‡} Sales+streaming figures based on certification alone.
