= Night Lights (Nat King Cole song) =

Single by Nat King Cole
- B-side: "To the Ends of the Earth"
- Released: September 1956
- Genre: Traditional pop
- Length: 2:47
- Label: Capitol
- Songwriter(s): Sammy Gallop, Chester Conn, Nelson Riddle

Nat King Cole singles chronology
"That's All There Is to That" (1956)	"Night Lights" (1956)	"The Christmas Song (Merry Christmas to You)" (1956)

"Night Lights" is a 1956 song by written by Sammy Gallop and Chester Conn, recorded by Nat King Cole, and released as a single on the Capitol Records label. The song reached number 17 on the Best Sellers in Stores chart in Billboard Magazine. It was ranked as one of the top songs of the year by Billboard in 1956.

== Charts ==
Chart (1956)	Peak position
Billboard Best Sellers in Stores	17
Billboard Most Played by Jockeys	11
Billboard Top 100	16
