= Louisiana Hayride =

Country music show originating in Shreveport, Louisiana

The Louisiana Hayride
- Genre: stage show and broadcast
- Home station: KWKH
- Syndicates: WLW
- TV adaptations: KSLA-TV
- Recording studio: Shreveport Municipal Memorial Auditorium (Shreveport, Louisiana)
- Original release: April 3, 1948 – August 27, 1960

Louisiana Hayride is a radio and later television country music show that was broadcast from the Shreveport Municipal Memorial Auditorium in Shreveport, Louisiana; during its heyday from 1948 to 1960, it helped to launch the careers of some of the greatest names in American country and western music. Created by KWKH station manager Henry Clay, the show is notable as a performance venue for a number of 1950s country musicians, as well as a nascent Elvis Presley.

== Hayride history ==
=== Beginnings ===
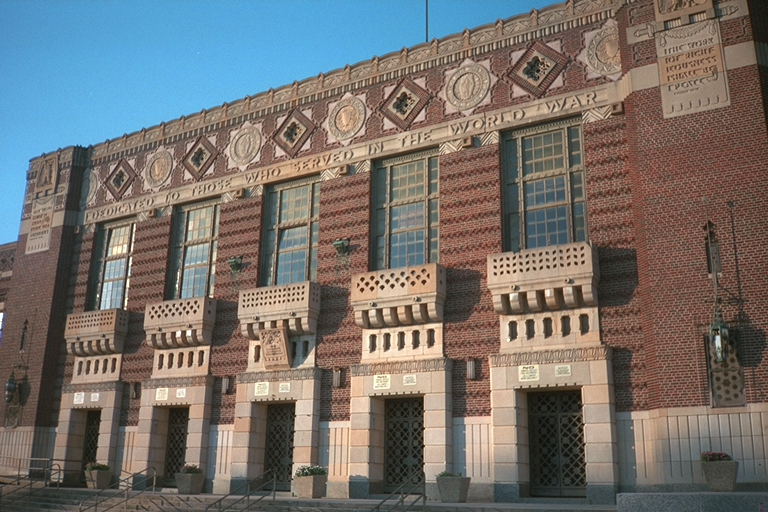
Shreveport Municipal Memorial Auditorium

The creators of the show took the name from the 1941 book with that title by Harnett Thomas Kane. First broadcast on April 3, 1948, from the Municipal Auditorium in downtown Shreveport, Horace Logan was the original producer and emcee. The musical cast for the inaugural broadcast included the Bailes Brothers, Johnnie and Jack, the Tennessee Mountain Boys with Kitty Wells, the Four Deacons, Curley Kinsey and the Tennessee Ridge Runners, Harmie Smith, the Ozark Mountaineers, the Mercy Brothers, and Tex Grimsley and the Texas Showboys.

=== Popularization ===
The show was soon made into a Broadway attraction called Louisiana Hayride. Within a year of its debut, the program was so popular that a regional 25-station network was set up to broadcast portions of the show, and was even heard overseas on Armed Forces Radio. The flagship station of the program was KWKH/1130 in Shreveport. The popularity of Louisiana Hayride spawned various incarnations in other parts of the United States, most notably in Cincinnati on WLW radio and later television; its version was dubbed Midwestern Hayride.

A KWKH microphone

Beginning with the successful first show on April 3, 1948, Louisiana Hayride ranked second only to Nashville's Grand Ole Opry in terms of importance until ABC began telecasting Ozark Jubilee in 1955. Hank Williams began performing on the Hayride in 1948 after his initial rejection from the Grand Ole Opry, and after being fired from the Opry on August 11, 1952, Williams returned to the Hayride briefly before his death on New Years Day, 1953.

=== Talent-scouting showcase ===
While the Opry, the Jubilee, and the Hayride all showcased established stars, the Hayride was where talented, but virtual unknowns, were also given exposure to a large audience. Over the years, country music greats such as Webb Pierce, Kitty Wells, Jimmie Davis, Will Strahan, Slim Whitman, Floyd Cramer, Sonny James, Hank Snow, Faron Young, Johnny Horton, Jim Reeves, Claude King, Jimmy Martin, George Jones, John and The Three Wise Men, Johnny Cash, Frankie Miller, Tex Ritter, Willie Nelson, Bob Wills, Cowboy Jack Hunt & Little Joe Hunt of the Rhythm Ranch Hands, Nat Stuckey, and Lefty Frizzell, among many others, performed on Louisiana Hayride.

=== The Elvis Presley connection ===
By mid-1954, a special 30-minute portion of Louisiana Hayride was being broadcast every Saturday on the AFN Pacific channel of the United Kingdom Scottish Forces Radio Network. On October 16 of that year, Elvis Presley appeared on the radio program. Presley's performance of his debut release on the Sun Records label, "That's All Right", brought a tepid response, according to former Hayride emcee Frank Page (1925–2013). Nonetheless, Presley was signed to a one-year contract for future appearances. Presley became so popular that after his final appearance on Hayride in 1956, emcee Horace Logan announced to the crowd a phrase that would become famous: "Elvis has left the building."

The immediate and enormous demand for more of Presley's new kind of rockabilly music actually resulted in a sharp decline in the popularity of the Louisiana Hayride that until that point had been strictly a country-music venue. On March 3, 1955, Presley made his first television appearance on the TV version of The Louisiana Hayride, carried by KSLA-TV, the CBS affiliate in Shreveport.

=== Cancellation and revivals ===
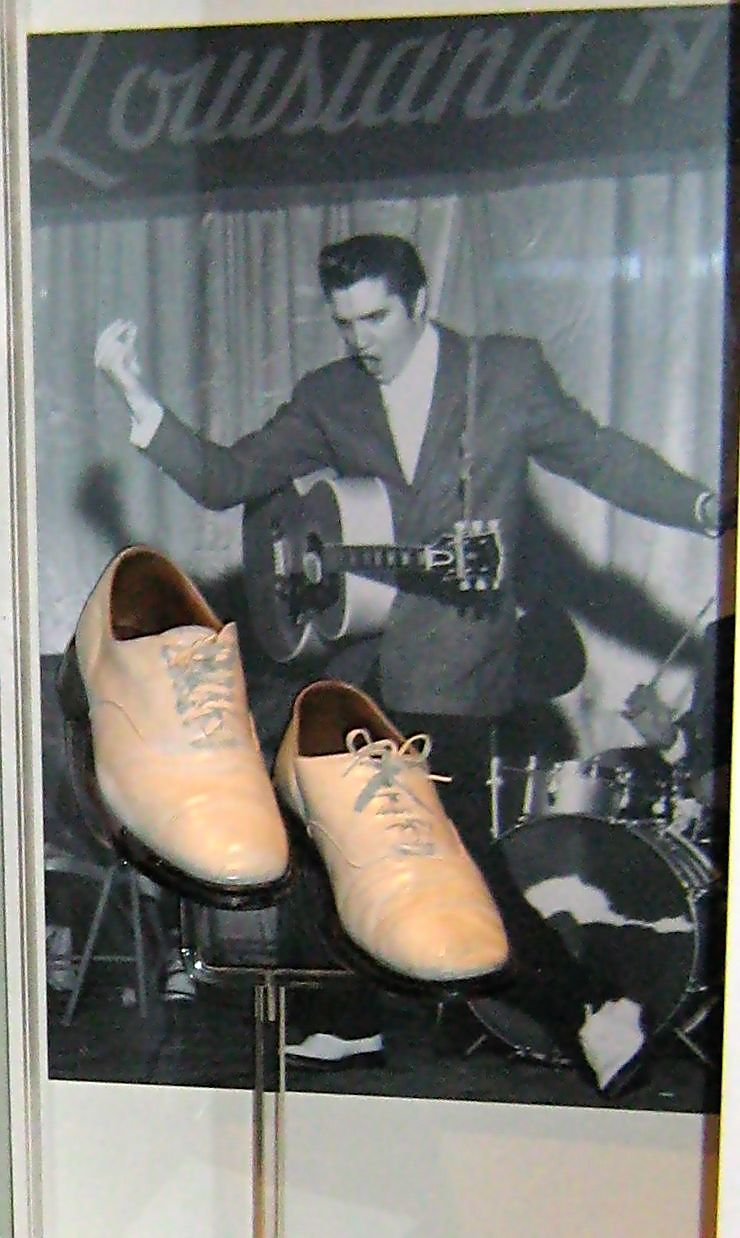
Elvis Presley in Louisiana Hayride

Within a few years, rock and roll had come to dominate the music scene, and on August 27, 1960, Louisiana Hayride ended its primary run. However, KWKH continued to use the Louisiana Hayride name for packaged music tours throughout the 1960s on a biweekly, monthly, or quarterly basis, finally ending operations entirely in 1969. In August 1974, Shreveport businessman David Kent mounted a country-music show originally called Hayride U.S.A., which was retitled Louisiana Hayride in 1975 after KWKH agreed to let Kent use the name. Located at a new dinner theater facility in Bossier City, this new Louisiana Hayride was syndicated on radio and ran until 1987, discovering such talent as Branson fiddle sensation Shoji Tabuchi and popular country singer Linda Davis.

Some strictly local performances have been done in the Shreveport area under the name, including a 2003 Louisiana Hayride cast reunion called One More Ride that featured 60 acts from the original show, including Kitty Wells, the Browns, Betty Amos, Homer Bailes, Billy Walker, Mitchell Torok, and Hank Thompson. Barney Cannon (1955–2009), a KWKH deejay, became a specialist on the history of country music, KWKH, and the Hayride. In August 2009, the Louisiana Hayride (1948–1960) was inducted into the Louisiana Music Hall of Fame.

In 2009, after several years of litigation over the Louisiana Hayride name and trademark, a federal court ruled that Margaret Lewis Warwick owned the rights to the name. As of May 31, 2012, KWKH had changed to a sports format and ceased producing the classic country-music format reminiscent of the Hayride era.

== At the Louisiana Hayride Tonight ==
At the Louisiana Hayride Tonight, a set of 20 CDs with 599 Hayride performances, was released in October 2017 by Bear Family Records. The release includes a book on the Hayride's history. A live recording of Jambalaya (On the Bayou), by Hank Williams, is included in the set. The set includes archival material from the collection of Chris Brown, Archivist at Centenary College of Louisiana in Shreveport, with the bulk of the audio and images in the set sourced from an archive originally assembled by Joey Kent between 1992–2009 and donated to the Library of Congress in 2009.

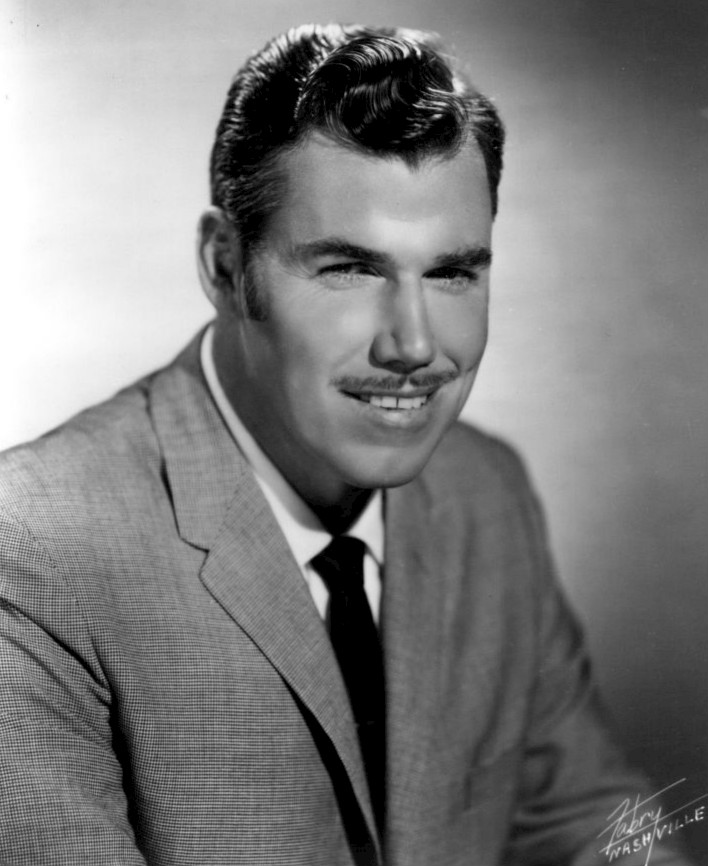
Otis Dewey "Slim" Whitman, who appeared on the radio program Louisiana Hayride

== Performers ==
- Betty Amos
- Jack Anglin
- Bailes Brothers
- Benny Barnes
- Ray Belcher
- Carl Belew
- Dudley Bernard
- Bill Black
- Eddie Bond
- Brad & Jerry
- The Browns
- Vin Bruce
- Gary Bryant
- Roy Burks
- Bill Carlisle
- Johnny Cash
- Mary Jo Chelette and the Chelette Sisters
- Zeke Clements
- Patsy Cline
- Jeff Dale
- Jimmie Davis
- Jimmy Dickens
- William (Tex) Dickerson
- Tibby Edwards
- Werly Fairburn
- Jimmy Fautheree
- Pete Fontana
- Tillman Franks
- Bob Gallion
- Marshall Grant
- The Gays
- Cliff Grimely
- Roy Hendrix
- Jeanette Hicks
- Goldie Hill
- Tommy Hill
- Hoot & Curley
- Johnny Horton
- Johnny Ray Harris
- David Houston
- Cowboy Jack Hunt
- Little Joe Hunt (world's fastest banjo picker)
- Sonny James
- Jimmy & Johnny
- Jerry Johnson
- George Jones
- Grandpa Jones
- Oakie Jones
- Jack Kay
- Buddy Thompson
- Merle Kilgore
- Claude King
- Jay King
- Horace Logan
- Bob Luman
- Maddox Brothers and Rose
- Emory Martin
- Jimmy Martin
- Johnny "Country" Mathis
- Paul Mims
- Scotty Moore
- Willie Nelson
- Bill Nettles
- Jimmy C. Newman
- James O'Gwynn
- Jimmy Osborne
- Buck Owens
- Frank Page
- Leon Payne
- Luther Perkins
- Charlie "Sugartime" Phillips
- Webb Pierce
- Elvis Presley
- JD Railey
- Jim Reeves
- Donn Reynolds
- Jack Rhodes
- Rice Brothers
- Gene Rodique
- Dido Rowley
- Tommy Sands
- Johnny Sea
- Shelton Brothers
- Bob Shelton
- Joe Shelton
- Eddy Sims
- Margie Singleton
- Billy R. Smith
- Harmie Smith
- Roy Sneed
- Bob Stegall
- Red Sovine
- Charlie Stokley
- Nat Stuckey
- Tommy Tomlinson
- Tommy Trent
- Billy Walker
- Don Warden
- Kitty Wells
- Slim Whitman
- Wilburn Brothers
- Wilkins-Knight Trio
- Slim Willet
- Audrey Williams
- Hank Williams
- Bob Wills
- Kitty Wilson
- Smiley Wilson
- Mac Wiseman
- Ginny Wright
- Johnnie Wright
- Ron Johnson
- Faron Young
- York Brothers
- Harvey Farr (musician)
- Charles Billy Kirkpatrick (bass)
- D. J. Fontana
- Wallace and Charlie Mercer
- Joseph "Gene" Cox
- Dan Emory
