= Anna Sosenko =

American songwriter, manager, and producer (1909–2000)

- Sosenko in 1943.
- Born: June 13, 1909; Camden, New Jersey
- Died: June 9, 2000 (aged 90); New York City
- Occupations: Songwriter, theatrical producer, manager

Anna Sosenko (June 13, 1909 – June 9, 2000) was an American songwriter and impresario who started her career in the 1930s. She was a manager and songwriter for cabaret singer Hildegarde, for whom she wrote "Darling, Je Vous Aime Beaucoup".

== Early life ==
Anna Sosenko was born in Camden, New Jersey, the daughter of Simon and Rebecca Sosenko. Her mother ran a restaurant and boarding house.

== Career ==
=== Managing Hildegarde ===
Sosenko is perhaps best known as the "formidable" manager and songwriter for American cabaret singer and fashion celebrity Hildegarde, for whom she wrote the song "Darling, Je Vous Aime Beaucoup" (1935). "I made her a sensation long before she was a sensation," Sosenko said of her work, crafting Hildegarde's exotic public persona. "Her ingenuity, her inventiveness, her organizational genius and her undying faith in her merchandise stamp Miss Sosenko as just about the smartest manager in show business today," declared journalist George Frazier, in a Life magazine profile of the pair in 1943. Sosenko produced The Raleigh Room (1945-1947), a radio program starring Hildegarde, with Alan Jay Lerner as head writer.

In the 1960s, Sosenko managed another singer, Felicia Sanders.

=== Producer and collector ===
In 1959, Sosenko co-produced a stage adaptation of Irving Stone's The Passionate Journey. She promoted Jacqueline Susann's first novel, Every Night, Josephine. In the 1970s and 1980s, she produced star-studded benefit shows, including tributes to Mary Martin, Ethel Merman, and Richard Rodgers. She helped develop the Songwriters' Hall of Fame, now known as the National Academy of Popular Music.

Sosenko had a large collection of theatrical memorabilia, and opened a small gallery in 1965, selling and trading such materials near Lincoln Center. She exhibited some of these at the Museum of the City of New York, and eventually donated her collection to several theatre history archives, including the Library of Congress.

== Personal life and legacy ==
Sosenko lived and worked with Hildegarde from 1933. The pair collected art, including works by French impressionists; that collection was sold when they separated in 1955. They reconciled late in life, and even performed together. Sosenko died in 2000, four days before her 91st birthday.

The bulk of her assets were, upon her death, transferred to the Anna Sosenko Assist Trust, which provides small grants "to aid and enhance the career development of worthy and talented individuals in need of such assistance in the performance areas of theatre, opera or concert."
