= The Christmas Song =

1949 Christmas song by Bob Wells and Mel Tormé

Song
- Published: 1945 by Burke and Van Heusen
- Genre: Christmas
- Songwriters: Robert Wells; Mel Tormé

"The Christmas Song" (commonly subtitled "Chestnuts Roasting on an Open Fire" or, as it was originally subtitled, "Merry Christmas to You") is a Christmas song written in 1945 (Note: Primary sources indicate the song was written in 1945. Other sources say 1944.) by Robert Wells and Mel Tormé. The Nat King Cole Trio first recorded the song in June 1946.

At Cole's behest – and over the objections of his label, Capitol Records – a second recording was made in August utilizing a small string section. This version became a massive hit on both the pop and R&B charts. Cole again recorded the song in 1953, using the same arrangement with a full orchestra arranged and conducted by Nelson Riddle, and once more in 1961, in a stereophonic version with another full orchestra arranged and conducted by Ralph Carmichael. Cole's 1961 version is generally regarded as definitive, while the original 1946 recording was inducted into the Grammy Hall of Fame in 1974. In 2022, the 1961 Nat King Cole recording was selected by the Library of Congress for preservation in the United States National Recording Registry as being "culturally, historically, or aesthetically significant."

== History ==
According to Tormé, the song was written in July 1945 during an exceptionally hot summer. It was in an effort to "stay cool by thinking cool" that the most-performed (according to BMI) Christmas song of all time was born. "I saw a spiral pad on his (Wells's) piano with four lines written in pencil", Tormé recalled. "They started, 'Chestnuts roasting..., Jack Frost nipping..., Yuletide carols..., Folks dressed up like Eskimos.' Bob didn't think he was writing a song lyric. He said he thought if he could immerse himself in winter he could cool off. Forty minutes later that song was written. I wrote all the music and some of the lyrics."

== Nat King Cole recordings ==
"The Christmas Song (Merry Christmas to You)"
- 1962 US single release

Single by The King Cole Trio
- B-side: "In the Cool of Evening"
- Released: November 1946 (2nd recording)
- Recorded: August 19, 1946
- Genre: Jazz; Traditional pop; Christmas
- Length: 3:10
- Label: Capitol
- Songwriters: Robert Wells; Mel Tormé

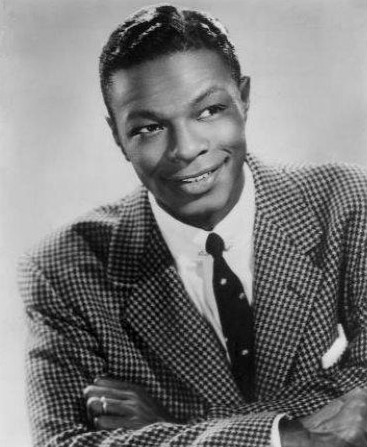
Nat King Cole (1958)

=== First recording ===
Recorded at WMCA Radio Studios, New York City, June 14, 1946. Label credit: The King Cole Trio (Nat King Cole, vocals & piano; Oscar Moore, guitarist; Johnny Miller, bassist). It was first issued by Capitol Records in 1946 on a 78 RPM shellac (Catalog #311). Not re-issued until 1989, when it was (accidentally) included on the various-artists compilation Billboard Greatest Christmas Hits (1935–1954) Rhino R1 70637(LP) / R2 70637(CD).

=== Second recording ===
Recorded at WMCA Radio Studios, New York City, August 19, 1946. First record issue. Label credit: The King Cole Trio with String Choir (Nat King Cole, vocals & piano; Oscar Moore, guitarist; Johnny Miller, bassist; Jack "The Bear" Parker, drummer; Charlie Grean, arranger and conductor of 4 string players and a harpist). Lacquer disc master #981. Issued November 1946 as Capitol 311 (78 rpm). It is available on the Cole compilation CDs Capitol Collectors Series and Christmas for Kids: From One to Ninety-Two, as well as on a CD called The Holiday Album, which has 1940s Christmas songs recorded by Cole and Bing Crosby.

=== Third recording ===
Recorded at Capitol Studios at 5515 Melrose Avenue in Hollywood, on August 24, 1953. It was the song's first magnetic tape recording. Label credit: The King Cole Trio with String Choir (Nat King Cole, vocals; Buddy Cole, pianist; John Collins, guitarist; Charlie Harris, bassist; Lee Young, drummer; Ann Stockton, harp; Charlie Grean, Pete Rugolo and Nelson Riddle, orchestral arrangement; Nelson Riddle, orchestra conductor). Master #11726, take 11. Issued November 1953 as the "new" Capitol 90036 (78 rpm) / F90036 (45 rpm) (Capitol first issued 90036 in 1950 with the second recording). Correct label credit issued on October 18, 1954, as Capitol 2955 (78 rpm) / F2955 (45 rpm). Label credit: Nat "King" Cole with Orchestra Conducted by Nelson Riddle. This recording is available on the Cole compilation CD Cole, Christmas, & Kids, as well as on the various-artists CDs Ultimate Christmas and Casey Kasem Presents All Time Christmas Favorites. It was also included, along with both 1946 recordings, on the Mosaic Records box set The Complete Capitol Recordings of the Nat King Cole Trio.

=== Fourth recording ===
Recorded at Capitol Studios, New York City, March 30, 1961. This rendition, the first recorded in stereo, is widely played on radio stations during the Christmas season, and has become the most popular/familiar version of this song. Label credit: Nat King Cole (Nat King Cole, vocals; Hank Jones, pianist; John Collins, guitarist; Charlie Harris, bassist; Lee Young, drummer; Charlie Grean, Pete Rugolo and Ralph Carmichael, orchestral arrangement; Ralph Carmichael, orchestra conductor). The instrumental arrangement is nearly identical to the 1953 version, but Cole's vocals are deeper-sounding and more focused. Originally done for The Nat King Cole Story (a 1961 LP devoted to stereo re-recordings of Cole's earlier hits), this recording was later included in a reissue of Cole's 1960 album The Magic of Christmas replacing "God Rest Ye Merry Gentlemen". Retitled The Christmas Song, the album was issued in 1962 as Capitol W-1967 (mono) / SW-1967 (stereo) and today is available for streaming, download and on vinyl and CD. This recording of "The Christmas Song" has also been included on numerous compilation albums of Christmas pop standards (for example, WCBS-FM's Ultimate Christmas Album Volume 3). An alternate take of the 1961 recording, featuring a different vocal and missing the solo piano on the instrumental bridge, appears on the Deluxe Edition of the 2014 compilation The Extraordinary Nat King Cole. There were several covers of Nat Cole's original record in the 1940s. The first of these was said to be by Dick Haymes on the Decca label, but his was released first – not recorded first. The first cover of "The Christmas Song" was performed by pop tenor and bandleader Eddy Howard on Majestic. Howard was a big Cole fan, and also covered Nat's versions of "I Want to Thank Your Folks" and "(I Love You) For Sentimental Reasons", among others.

=== Charts ===
For the US Billboard Hot 100 chart dated January 7, 2023, the song entered the top 10 for the first time, giving Cole a record span between appearances of 59 years, six months and a week (since June 29, 1963's "Those Lazy-Hazy-Crazy Days of Summer" appearance) and giving the song the record for longest journey to the top 10 (62 years and 26 days), surpassing "Run Rudolph Run" by 8 days. The song had previously peaked at number 11 during the 2018 holiday season.

==== Weekly charts ====
Chart (1960–1962)	Peak position
US Billboard Hot 100	65

Chart (1991–2026)	Peak position
Australia (ARIA)	25
Austria (Ö3 Austria Top 40)	24
Belgium (Ultratop 50 Wallonia)	46
Canada Hot 100 (Billboard)	12
Denmark (Tracklisten)	27
Finland (Suomen virallinen lista)	40
France (SNEP)	44
Germany (GfK)	27
Global 200 (Billboard)	11
Greece International (IFPI)	16
Hungary (Single Top 40)	32
Iceland (Tónlistinn)	31
Ireland (IRMA)	23
Italy (FIMI)	28
Latvia Streaming (LaIPA)	12
Lithuania (AGATA)	15
Luxembourg (Billboard)	16
Netherlands (Single Top 100)	30
New Zealand (Recorded Music NZ)	19
Norway (VG-lista)	32
Poland (Polish Streaming Top 100)	44
Portugal (AFP)	23
Russia Streaming (TopHit)	87
Slovakia Singles Digital (ČNS IFPI)	75
Sweden (Sverigetopplistan)	15
Switzerland (Schweizer Hitparade)	21
UK Singles (Official Charts)	21
US Billboard Hot 100	6
US Rolling Stone Top 100	33

==== Monthly charts ====
Monthly chart performance
Chart (2026)	Peak position
Russia Streaming (TopHit)	86

==== Year-end charts ====
Annual chart rankings
Chart (2023)	Rank
US Streaming Songs (Billboard)	71

==== Decade-end charts ====
20s Decade-end chart performance
Chart (2025–2026)	Position
Russia Streaming (TopHit)	130

=== Certifications ===
Region	Certification	Certified units/sales
Denmark (IFPI Danmark)	Platinum	90,000^{‡}
Germany (BVMI)	Gold	300,000^{‡}
Italy (FIMI)	Gold	35,000^{‡}
New Zealand (RMNZ)	Platinum	30,000^{‡}
Portugal (AFP)	Gold	5,000^{‡}
United Kingdom (BPI)	2× Platinum	1,200,000^{‡}
Streaming
Greece (IFPI Greece)	Gold	1,000,000^{†}
^{‡} Sales+streaming figures based on certification alone.^{†} Streaming-only figures based on certification alone.

== Other versions ==
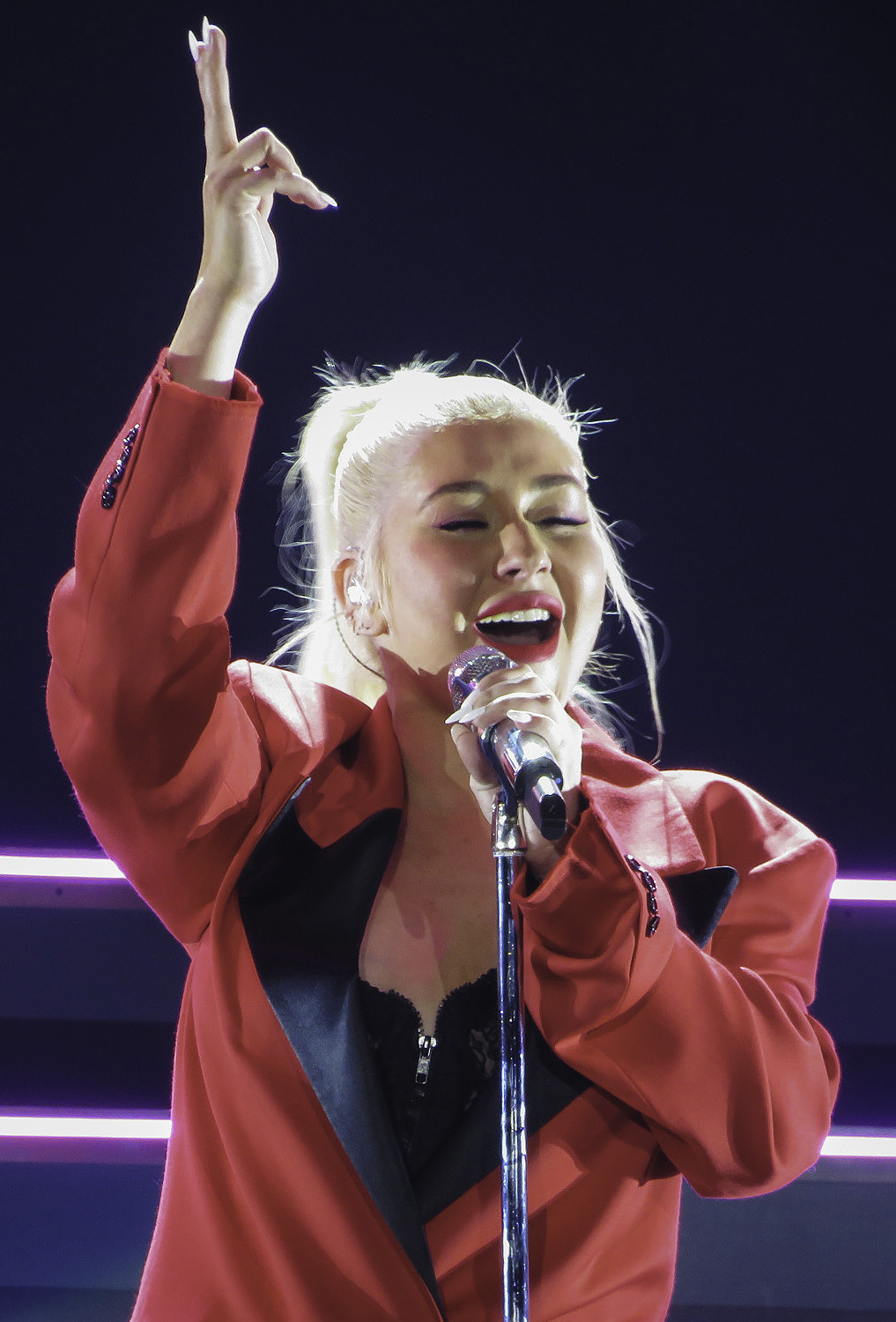
American singer Christina Aguilera's (pictured) version became the second highest charting position of the song on the Billboard Hot 100 after the original 55 years earlier

"The Christmas Song" has been covered by numerous artists from a wide variety of genres. In December 1946, Bing Crosby performed it on a recorded radio broadcast with an introduction including Skitch Henderson on piano. Crosby, with the Ken Darby Singers and the John Scott Trotter Orchestra, also made a studio recording on March 19, 1947, which went on to be released as a single later that same year. In 1953, Perry Como performed the song for both the Christmas Joy single and his album Around the Christmas Tree.

In 1999, Christina Aguilera recorded a version and included it on her album, My Kind of Christmas (2000). The song found critical and commercial success and peaked at number 18 on the US Billboard Hot 100 singles chart; the second highest position for the song on the chart after the original. Aguilera's cover also reached number 72 on the Hot 100 Singles Sales 2000 year-end chart, compiled by Billboard.

In 2003 for his EP Let It Snow, Michael Bublé recorded a cover of the song. It charted at number 6 on the Billboard Adult Contemporary chart. In 2018, Lauren Daigle's cover of the song reached number 55 on the Billboard Hot 100 and number one on the Christian Songs chart. In 2021, Jacob Collier's cover of the song was nominated for the Grammy Award for Best Arrangement, Instrumental and Vocals at the 64th Annual ceremony.

The song has also been covered by Doris Day with the Les Brown Jr. Orchestra of Renown, Ariana Grande, Brandy, Camila Cabello, The Carpenters, Celine Dion, Ella Fitzgerald, Elizabeth Gillies, Frank Sinatra, The Jackson 5, John Legend, JoJo, Justin Bieber, Kenny Burrell, Luther Vandross, Mariya Takeuchi, Mary J. Blige, Ne-Yo, NSYNC, Pentatonix, Peter Hollens, Shawn Mendes, and Toni Braxton, Jung Kook, among others.

=== Mel Tormé recordings ===
Mel Tormé himself made several recordings of the song, including versions released in 1955 (on his live Coral Records album At the Crescendo), 1961 (on his Verve Records album My Kind of Music), 1970 (on a Columbia Records promo single), 1990 (in a medley with "Autumn Leaves", on his live Concord Records album Mel Tormé Live at the Fujitsu–Concord Festival 1990), and 1992 (on his Telarc Records album Christmas Songs).

The 1970 Columbia version of the song adds an opening verse, written in 1963 while Tormé was working as musical arranger for The Judy Garland Show. He first performed and introduced the opening verse while duetting with Garland on the song for the show's Christmas Special, which aired on December 22, 1963:

All through the year we waited
Waited through spring and fall
To hear silver bells ringing, see wintertime bringing
The happiest season of all

Additionally, Tormé's recordings typically include a coda adapted from "Here We Come A-wassailing":

Love and joy come to you
And to you your Christmas too
And God bless you and send you a happy New Year
And God send you a happy New Year

== See also ==
- List of Christmas carols
