= Darling, Je Vous Aime Beaucoup =

1935 American popular song

"Darling, Je Vous Aime Beaucoup" is a popular song with words and music by Anna Sosenko in 1935. Sosenko was the manager of the singer Hildegarde who adopted the song as her theme.

It was introduced in the film Love and Hisses by Hildegarde and charted by Hildegarde at # 21 in 1943.

== Other notable recordings ==
- 1941 – Bing Crosby recorded July 14, 1941 with Victor Young and His Orchestra.
- 1954 – Nat King Cole – The best-selling version of the song which reached a peak Billboard position # 7 in 1955. Cole re-recorded the song in stereo for his 1961 album The Nat King Cole Story.
- 1956 – Deep River Boys — with orchestra recorded the song in Oslo on August 24, 1956. It was released on the extended play Hello Young Lovers (His Master's Voice 7EGN 12).
- 1962 – Dean Martin – included in his album French Style.
- 2016 - Dame Blanche Music - recorded for 3FM Serious Request in the Netherlands

== In popular culture ==
The stranger on the balcony in Bob Dylan's and Jacques Levy's song "Black Diamond Bay" from the 1976 album "Desire" says “My darling, je vous aime beaucoup” to the female character.

== Lyrics ==
The French in the title, along with "wish my French were good enough", is used as a refrain. It means "darling, I love you very much."

When the song was written, "je vous aime" (using the respectful second person plural) was the normal way of saying "I love you" in French - until a threshold of intimacy had been reached, or in public. It has come to sound quaint, as now one would normally say "je t'aime" (using the familiar second person singular), regardless of the level of intimacy or location.

"Je ne sais pas" in the song means "I don't know." "Compris" (or "compree" as it is sometimes phonetically spelled in printed lyrics) means "understood." "Toujours" means "always." "Chérie" means "dear." "Très très fort" means "very very strong" or "very much".
