= Ramblin' Rose =

Single by Nat "King" Cole

from the album Ramblin' Rose
- B-side: "The Good Times"
- Released: July 1962
- Studio: Capitol (Hollywood)
- Length: 2:45
- Label: Capitol
- Songwriters: Noel Sherman and Joe Sherman
- Producer: Lee Gillette

Nat "King" Cole singles chronology
"Let There Be Love" (1962)	"Ramblin' Rose" (1962)	"Dear Lonely Hearts" (1962)

"Ramblin' Rose" is a 1962 popular country song written by brothers Noel Sherman (words) and Joe Sherman (music) and popularized by Nat King Cole. The recording by Nat King Cole reached No. 2 on the Billboard Hot 100 chart in 1962.

== Original song release ==
Cole's recording of the song was released July 16, 1962, as a single by Capitol Records (catalog no. 4804; Side A; matrix no. 45-AA37861). It reached number two on both the Billboard and Cash Box charts - kept from number one by "Sherry" by The Four Seasons - and sold more than a million copies as a single. The song spent five weeks at number one on the Billboard Easy Listening chart and the Australian charts, while on the R&B chart, the song reached number seven. It was released as a single from Cole's album of the same name. The song was nominated for a Grammy Award in the category Record of the Year.

== Copyright ==
Original copyright

- Catalog of Copyright Entries, Third Series, Music, Library of Congress, Copyright Office
1. Vol. 16; Part 5, No. 2, July–December 1962 (1963). "Ramblin' Rose". © Sweco Music Corp.; 6 August 1962; EP166499. p. 1465. (assigned to Comet Music Ltd. in 1962)

Copyright renewal

- U.S. Copyright Office website (U.S. Copyright Search link)
2. "Ramblin' Rose". © Renewal: 5 January 1990; RE465829

== Charts ==
Chart (1962)	Peak position
Belgium (Ultratop 50 Flanders)	14
Belgium (Ultratop 50 Wallonia)	49
Canada (CHUM Chart)	2
New Zealand (Lever Hit Parade)	2
Ireland (IRMA)	5
Norway (VG-lista)	5
UK Singles (Official Charts)	5
US Billboard Hot 100	2
US Adult Contemporary (Billboard)	1
US Cash Box Top 100	2
West Germany (GfK)	3

== Covers and similar songs ==
The song has been covered by many artists, particularly country music artists.

There are four country versions of the song. Sonny James recorded the song first in July 1968 and released it five years later on the album The Gentleman from the South in 1973. Johnny Lee's version reached number 37 on the Billboard country chart in 1977. The following year, singer Hank Snow's version charted at number 93. In 1978, Johnny Rodriguez released a cover of the song on the album Love Me with All Your Heart.

Petula Clark released a French version in 1962, titled "Les Beaux Jours". Her recording reached number 10 in the French charts in 1963.

Swedish singer Carli Tornehave made a Swedish cover, "Törnrosen" in 1962.

Others recording this version of the song were Charley Pride (1962), Roy Rogers (1962), Billy Vaughn, Louis Armstrong, Bobby Vinton, Engelbert Humperdinck, Paul Anka, Floyd Cramer, Sammy Davis Jr. (The Nat King Cole Songbook, 1965), Chuck Berry (1967), George Benson, the Mills Brothers, Dean Martin (1973), Marvin Gaye (1976), and Slim Whitman.

Two other popular songs have identical titles, not to be confused with the Nat King Cole hit.

- "Ramblin' Rose", sometimes titled "(Love Is Like A) Ramblin' Rose", which was written by Marijohn Wilkin, Fred Burch, and Obey Wilson. This song was first recorded by Jerry Lee Lewis and released in 1962 as a B-side. It has been covered by, among others, Ted Taylor, MC5, Primal Scream and the Finnish punk band Pelle Miljoona & 1980.
- "Rambling Rose", a light pop song from 1948, was composed by Joe Burke with lyrics by Joseph McCarthy. A number of singers recorded it, most notably Perry Como. Dean Martin recorded both of these songs.

== See also ==
- List of number-one adult contemporary singles of 1962 (U.S.)

== Bibliography ==
- Hyatt, Wesley (1999). The Billboard Book of #1 Adult Contemporary Hits (Billboard Publications)
