= Just One of Those Things (album) =

1957 studio album by Nat King Cole

Studio album by Nat King Cole
- Released: November 1957
- Recorded: July 10, 19, 31, August 7, 1957
- Studio: Capitol (Hollywood)
- Genre: Jazz
- Length: 31:47
- Label: Capitol
- Producer: Lee Gillette

Nat King Cole chronology
After Midnight (1957)	Just One of Those Things (1957)	Love Is the Thing (1957)

Professional ratings
Review scores
Source	Rating
AllMusic	3/5 stars

Just One of Those Things is a 1957 album by Nat King Cole. It was the first of two full-length Cole albums arranged and conducted by Billy May, and is now considered "an all-time classic." The record placed at number 18 on the Billboard popular album chart.

== Track listing ==
1. "When Your Lover Has Gone" (Einar Aaron Swan) – 2:33
2. "A Cottage for Sale" (Larry Conley, Willard Robison) – 3:00
3. "Who's Sorry Now?" (Bert Kalmar, Harry Ruby, Ted Snyder) – 3:00
4. "Once in a While" (Michael Edwards, Bud Green) – 2:50
5. "These Foolish Things (Remind Me of You)" (Harry Link, Holt Marvell, Jack Strachey) – 3:49
6. "Just for the Fun of It" (Lorenz Hart, A. Jackson) – 2:37
7. "Don't Get Around Much Anymore" (Duke Ellington, Bob Russell) – 3:13
8. "I Understand" (Kim Gannon, Mabel Wayne) – 2:27
9. "Just One of Those Things" (Cole Porter) – 2:17
10. "The Song is Ended (but the Melody Lingers On)" (Irving Berlin) – 2:49
11. "I Should Care" (Sammy Cahn, Axel Stordahl, Paul Weston) – 2:49
12. "The Party's Over" (Betty Comden, Adolph Green, Jule Styne) – 2:45

=== Just One of Those Things (And More) ===
Capitol Records re-issued the album in 1987 as part of their CD Xtra Trax Pax series as Just One of Those Things (And More). Featuring a cropped image of the original sleeve artwork, the release included the above track listing alongside three additional tracks:

- "Day In—Day Out" (R. Bloom, J. Mercer)
- "I'm Gonna Sit Right Down (And Write Myself a Letter)" (F. E. Ahlert, J. Young)
- "Something Makes Me Want to Dance" (C. Romoff, D. Meehan)

== Personnel ==
=== Performance ===
- Nat King Cole – vocal
- Billy May – arranger, conductor
