= Sweet Lorraine =

1928 jazz standard by Cliff Burwell (music) and Mitchell Parish (lyrics)

Song
- Published: 1928 by Mills Music, Inc.
- Composer: Cliff Burwell
- Lyricist: Mitchell Parish

"Sweet Lorraine" is a popular song with music by Cliff Burwell and words by Mitchell Parish that was published in 1928 and has become a jazz standard. It is written in F major and has an AABA structure.

A version by Teddy Wilson charted in October 1935, peaking at #17. Nat King Cole recorded "Sweet Lorraine" in 1940 as the King Cole Trio and it became his first hit. Frank Sinatra recorded the song on December 17, 1946 as part of the Metronome All Stars, with a number of other all stars, including Johnny Hodges, Charlie Shavers, and Coleman Hawkins. Nat King Cole was on piano. His version was released as a single on Columbia Records (#37293) but did not chart. The Nat "King" Cole Trio rerecorded the song in 1956 and released it on the Capitol album After Midnight. Sinatra recorded it again on March 14, 1977 for a proposed album of songs about women on Reprise. The album was not completed and the recording was not released until The Reprise Collection in 1990. It was also recorded by Donnie Brooks, released on ERA Records in 1961.

== See also ==
- List of 1920s jazz standards
- Maureen Stapleton § Filmography (film Sweet Lorraine)
