= Shreveport Municipal Memorial Auditorium =

Theater and meeting hall in Shreveport, Louisiana, United States

- U.S. National Register of Historic Places
- U.S. National Historic Landmark
- U.S. Historic district – Contributing property
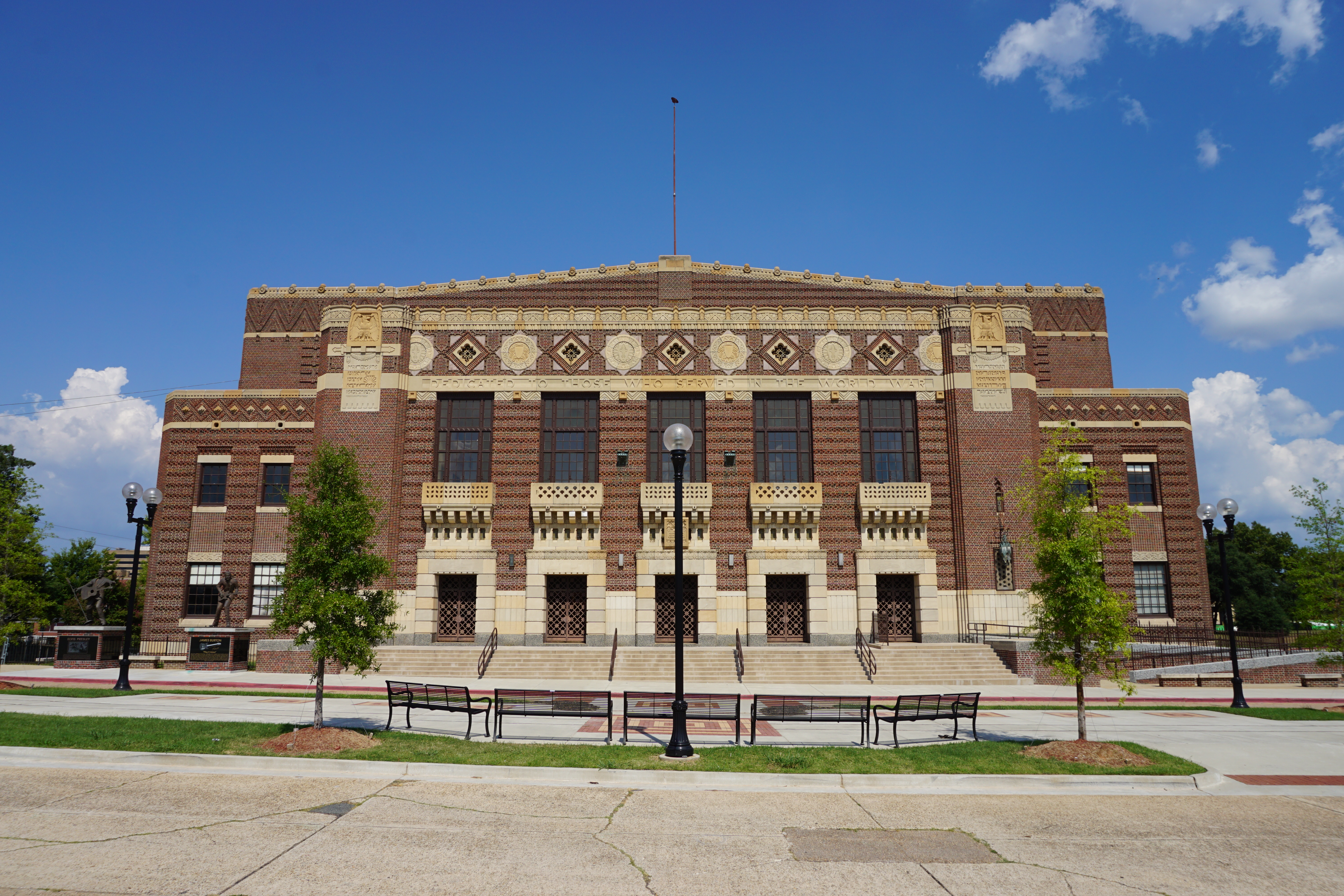

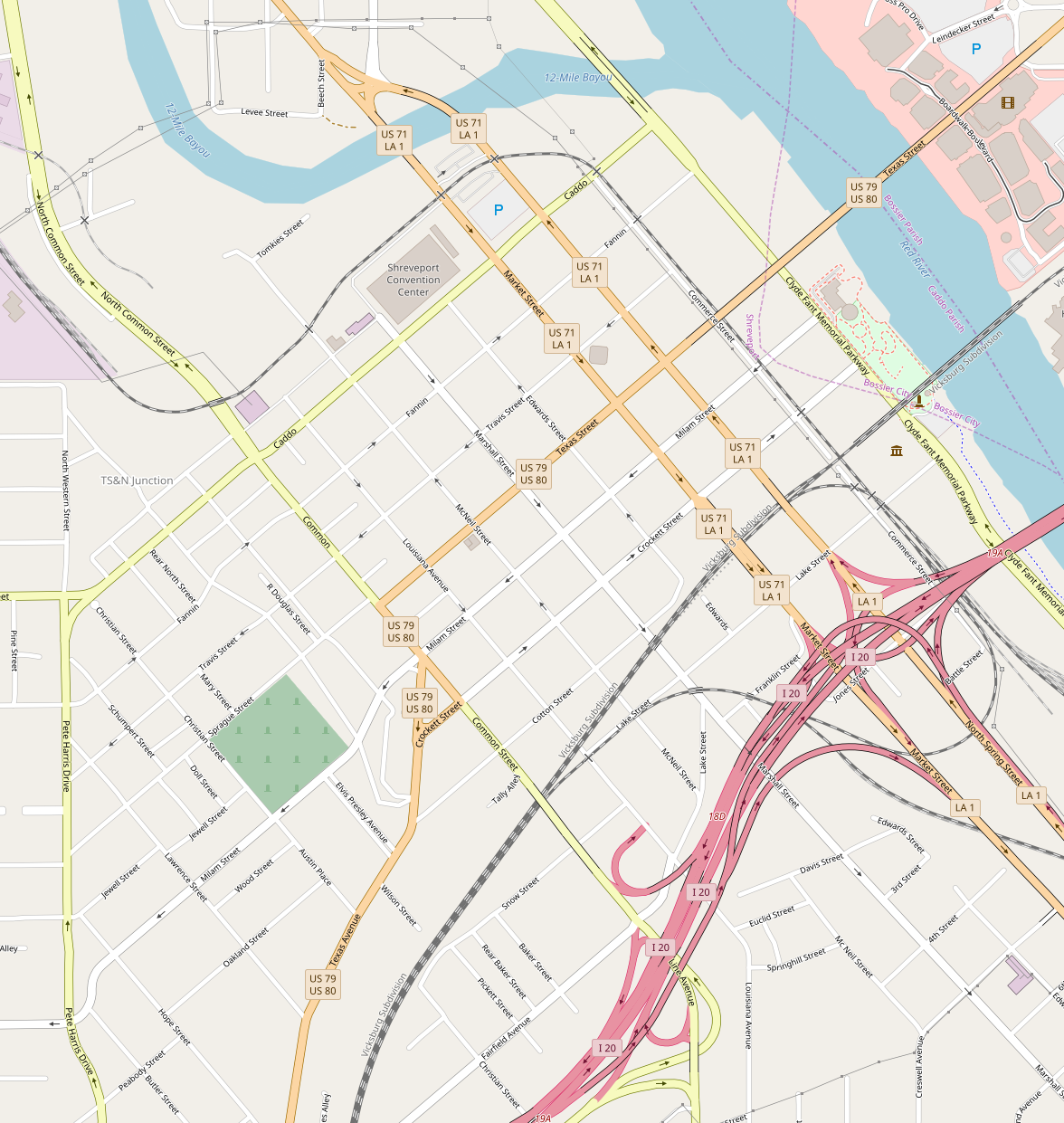
- Location within Shreveport Downtown
- Location: 705 Elvis Presley Boulevard (formerly Grand Avenue), Shreveport, Louisiana
- Coordinates: 32°30′29″N 93°45′11″W
- Area: 2 acres (0.81 ha)
- Built: 1929
- Built by: Ashton Glassell Company, Inc.
- Architects: Jones, Roessle, Olschner & Wiener
- Architectural style: Art Deco
- Part of: Shreveport Commercial Historic District (ID82002760)
- NRHP reference No.: 91000624

Significant dates
- Added to NRHP: May 28, 1991
- Designated NHL: October 6, 2008
- Designated CP: May 16, 1997

Shreveport Municipal Memorial Auditorium is a historic performance and meeting venue at 705 Elvis Presley Boulevard in Shreveport, Louisiana. It is an Art Deco building constructed between 1926 and 1929 during the administration of Mayor Lee Emmett Thomas as a memorial to the servicemen of World War I. In 1991, the auditorium was listed on the National Register of Historic Places and on October 6, 2008, it was designated a National Historic Landmark.

The building also became a contributing property of Shreveport Commercial Historic District when its boundaries were increased on May 16, 1997.

== Design ==
The building was designed by architects Samuel G. Wiener Sr., and Seymour Van Os, both of the firm of Jones, Roessle, Olschner & Wiener of Shreveport. Contractor for construction was the Ashton Glassell Company, also of Shreveport.

== Stage of Stars Museum ==
The Municipal Memorial Auditorium houses the Stage of Stars Museum, and a 3,200-seat auditorium, which is used for concerts, family shows, Broadway plays, boxing, and other special events. It is nationally significant, and was designated a National Historic Landmark, for hosting the Louisiana Hayride radio program, hosted by Frank Page (1925–2013). During its heyday, from 1948 to 1960, the program spawned the careers of some of the greatest names in American Country and Rockabilly music. The Hayride regularly featured performers, such as Hank Williams, Slim Whitman, Jim Reeves, Johnny Cash, Johnny Horton, and Elvis Presley, who got his start at this venue.

== Renovations ==
The auditorium underwent renovations from 1994 through 2004. Recent improvements to the auditorium have included air conditioning, renovated restrooms, installation of ramps and an elevator.

== See also ==
- List of concert halls
- Lists of music venues
- List of theaters in Louisiana
- List of National Historic Landmarks in Louisiana
- National Register of Historic Places listings in Caddo Parish, Louisiana
