= Cliff Burwell =

American composer

Clifford R. Burwell (October 6, 1898 – October 10, 1976) was an American pianist and composer. He was born in New Haven, Connecticut on October 6, 1898. His most popular composition was "Sweet Lorraine," with lyrics by Mitchell Parish.

== Career ==
Billy Mayerl's 1924 arrangement of "Georgie Porgie", sung by Rudy Vallee in 1928 for Victor Records, with Burwell providing piano accompaniment.

He played piano in dance bands in the 1920s, including touring with the Paul Whiteman Orchestra. His compositions included "Swing Express to Harlem" "Going Wacky" and "Why." He became the pianist and arranger for the Rudy Vallee band in 1928. The song "Sweet Lorraine" was introduced on the radio by Rudy Vallee in 1928. That year it was recorded by Vallee and also Johnny Johnson & his Hotel Statler Pennsylvanians. It was recorded by Isham Jones in 1932 and Teddy Wilson in 1935 both for Brunswick. The King Cole Trio recording on Decca in 1940 established Nat King Cole as a singer.

He played piano with the Rudy Vallee band from 1928 to 1943. He died in New Haven on October 10, 1976.
