= Noel Sherman =

American lyricist and nightclub promoter

Noel Sherman (30 June 1930 Brooklyn – 4 June 1972 New York) was an American lyricist and nightclub producer. Among the standards that Sherman composed, often with his brother Joe Sherman, are "Ramblin' Rose", "Graduation Day", "Eso Beso" (no), "To the Ends of the Earth", and "Juke Box Baby".

== Career ==
Sherman, born to Julius Sherman, a dentist, and Mary Rothman (maiden) graduated from New York University where he was inducted into the Phi Beta Kappa honor society. His brother, Joe, was his chief collaborator.

== Bibliography ==
=== Selected copyrights ===
Original copyrights

- Catalog of Copyright Entries, Third Series, Music, Library of Congress, Copyright Office
1. Vol. 10; Part 5A, No. 1, January–June 1956 (1957). "Graduation Day". © Sheldon Music Inc.; 23 April 1956; EP99021. p. 244.
2. Vol. 10; Part 5A, No. 1, January–June 1956 (1957). "Juke-Box Baby". © Winneton Music Corp.; 5 March 1956; EP98281. p. 244.
3. Vol. 10; Part 5A, No. 2, July–December 1956 (1957). "To the Ends of the Earth". © Winneton Music Corp.; 23 October 1956; EP103529. p. 705.
4. Vol. 16; Part 5, No. 2, July–December 1962 (1963). "Eso Beso" ("That Kiss"). © Flanka Music Corp.; 12 September 1962; EP735978. p. 1164.
5. Vol. 16; Part 5, No. 2, July–December 1962 (1963). "Ramblin' Rose". © Sweco Music Corp.; 6 August 1962; EP166499. p. 1465. (assigned to Comet Music Ltd. in 1962)

Copyright renewals

- U.S. Copyright Office website (U.S. Copyright Search link)
1. "Ramblin' Rose". © Renewal: 5 January 1990; RE465829

=== References ===
- "Sherman Dies; A Capitol Exec". Billboard. Vol. 84, no. 26. Penske Media Corporation. June 24, 1972. p. 70 – via Google Books. "Among the standards that Sherman composed are "Ramblin' Rose," "Graduation Day," "Eso Beso" and "To the Ends of the Earth.""
- ASCAP Biographical Dictionary (4th ed.). New York: R. R. Bowker. 1980. p. 461. ISBN 0-8352-1283-1. LCCN 80-65351. OCLC 1147715021 – via Internet Archive.
