= Dominic John =

- Born: 1980 (age 44–45); England
- Occupation: Professional pianist
- Instrument: Piano

Dominic John (born 1980) is a British pianist.

John began piano lessons with his mother. He studied with Patsy Toh at the Junior Royal Academy of Music, and with John Barstow and Andrew Ball at the Royal College of Music. He held the Royal College of Music Society Junior Fellowship from 2004 to 2006. He is active as a soloist, member of various chamber ensembles, and accompanist to singers and instrumentalists. Awards include the Chappell Gold Medal of the Royal College of Music, and he was the winner of the 2004 British Music Society Awards (piano),

John performed with violinist Itzhak Perlman at an evening soirée. In 2005, he performed Tchaikovsky's Piano Concerto and Saint-Saëns' Carnival of the Animals with the Osaka Philharmonic in Symphony Hall, Osaka. In October 2006 he was invited to perform Grieg's Piano Concerto in the Congress Theatre, Eastbourne, and gave a masterclass to pupils at Eastbourne College. He is a staff accompanist at the Junior Department, Royal Academy of Music.

John's first commercial recording, Wild About Transcription... was released by Willowhayne Records in July 2014.

He is a regular guest entertainer on P & O Cruises & Cunard Line.
