= Joe Sherman (songwriter) =

American composer, producer, and arranger

Joseph Daniel Sherman (September 25, 1926 – March 17, 2017) was an American songwriter, conductor, arranger, publisher and producer.

== Career ==
Sherman was born in Brooklyn, New York, United States.

Joe Sherman's chief collaborators included his brother, Noel, as well as George David Weiss, Sid Wayne, Langston Hughes, and Abby Mann. With his brother as lyricist, he composed "To the Ends of the Earth" and "Eso Beso" for Paul Anka and "Juke Box Baby" for Perry Como. The brothers joint composition "Ramblin' Rose" was a hit for Nat King Cole, among others.

His brother, Noel, died in 1972. Joe Sherman died on March 17, 2017.

== Partial discography ==
=== Albums ===
Joe Sherman and the Arena Brass

- Promise Her Anything (Epic Records, 1966)

Nancy Ames

- Latin Pulse (Epic Records, 1966)
- Live at the Americana (Epic Records, 1968)

=== Singles & EPs ===
Connie Francis

- "Malagueña" (1960)

Guy Mitchell

- "Heartaches by the Number" (1960)

== Bibliography ==
- "Sherman Dies; A Capitol Exec". Billboard. Vol. 84, no. 26. Penske Media Corporation. June 24, 1972. p. 70 – via Google Books. "Among the standards that Sherman composed are "Ramblin' Rose," "Graduation Day," "Eso Beso" and "To the Ends of the Earth.""
- Langer, Arthur (April 12, 2012). Songs at Twilight: Stories of My Time. Bloomington, Indiana: AuthorHouse. p. 187. ISBN 978-1-4634-3202-7. LCCN 2011911546. OCLC 1124414814 – via Google Books. "...Joe had already built an outstanding reputation as a songwriter, having written such hits as "Ramblin' Rose" and "That Sunday, That Summer" for Nat "King" Cole, "Eso Beso" for Paul Anka, and others like "To the Ends of the Earth" and "Graduation Day.""
- ASCAP Biographical Dictionary (4th ed.). New York: R. R. Bowker. 1980. p. 461. ISBN 0-8352-1283-1. LCCN 80-65351. OCLC 1147715021 – via Internet Archive.
