= Just One of Those Things (song) =

1935 popular song written by Cole Porter

"Just One of Those Things" is a popular song written by Cole Porter for the 1935 musical Jubilee.

Porter had written the score for Jubilee while on an extended sea cruise in the early part of 1935; however, in September 1935, Jubilee's librettist Moss Hart mentioned that the play's second act required an additional song. Porter had "Just One of Those Things" completed by the following morning. (He had previously used the title for a song intended for but not featured in the 1930 musical The New Yorkers. Apart from the title the two songs are distinct).

Porter's original lyric lacked an adjective for the line "a trip to the moon on gossamer wings": "gossamer" would be suggested by his friend, Ed Tauch.

A recording by Richard Himber reached the charts of the day in 1935 and Peggy Lee's stylized arrangement of the song was a No. 14 hit in the Billboard charts in 1952.

== Other recordings ==
The song has become a standard of the Great American Songbook, with many other recordings having been made of it. Among artists who have recorded it are Ella Fitzgerald, Anita O'Day, Louis Armstrong, Billie Holiday, Sarah Vaughan, Bing Crosby (recorded January 21, 1945), Doris Day, Lena Horne, Maxine Sullivan, Frank Sinatra, Johnny Hartman, Mel Torme, Louis Prima, Diana Krall, John Barrowman, Bryan Ferry, Lionel Hampton, Claude Bolling, Charlie Parker, Gil Evans, Dave Brubeck, Freddie Hubbard, Oscar Peterson, Lee Morgan, Sidney Bechet, Nellie McKay, Erin McKeown, Joan Morris, Judy Garland, Patricia Barber, Johnny Dorelli, Jamie Cullum, Mabel Mercer, Dionne Warwick, The Pogues with Kirsty MacColl and the Cherry Poppin' Daddies. Nat King Cole recorded it as the title track of his 1957 album Just One Of Those Things. Maurice Chevalier included it in a Cole Porter medley on his farewell album, released on his 80th birthday. Shirley Bassey recorded the song in 1963 for her EP In Other Words.... Tony Bennett recorded a version of the song for his 2021 collaborative album with Lady Gaga, Love for Sale. Anna-Jane Casey performed the song live at the 2010 BBC Swinging Christmas, under the John Wilson Orchestra.

== Film appearances ==
- 1942 Panama Hattie - sung by Lena Horne.
- 1945 Just One of Those Things - sung by Louise Tobin.
- 1946 Night and Day - sung by Ginny Simms and danced by Estelle Sloan with chorus.
- 1951 Lullaby of Broadway - performed by Doris Day.
- 1953 The Jazz Singer - performed by Peggy Lee.
- 1954 Young at Heart - sung by Frank Sinatra.
- 1960 Can-Can - performed by Maurice Chevalier.
- 1972 Sleuth
- 1975 At Long Last Love - performed by Burt Reynolds, Cybill Shepherd, and Duilio Del Prete.
- 2003 Rosenstrasse
- 2004 De-Lovely - sung by Diana Krall
- 2005 Rumor Has It - sung by Nellie McKay

== In popular culture ==
In 1958, Polly Bergen and guests Dick Van Dyke and Carol Haney performed "Just One of Those Things" on her short-lived NBC variety show, The Polly Bergen Show. Also on television, Diana Dors plays a nightclub singer who sings the song in the 1963 "Run for Doom" episode of The Alfred Hitchcock Hour.

In 1983, it was used on NBC News Overnight's final broadcast on December 3, during the montage of the show's staff.

In 2019, actress Helena Bonham Carter performed a rendition of the song in the third-season premiere of The Crown, while her character, Princess Margaret, is at a dinner party.

Mariah Carey sings a few lines of the chorus, when describing a past love affair in the audiobook of her autobiography, The Meaning of Mariah Carey.

The title of the final, 2-hour episode of M*A*S*H, "Goodbye, Farewell and Amen", is from the song's lyrics.

== See also ==
- List of 1930s jazz standards
