= Ralph Carmichael =

American composer (1927–2021)

- Born: May 27, 1927; Quincy, Illinois, U.S.
- Died: October 18, 2021 (aged 94); Camarillo, California, U.S.
- Education: Vanguard University
- Occupations: Composer, arranger
- Spouses: Evangeline Otto (m. 1948; div. 1964) Marvella Price (m. 1965)
- Children: Carol Parks
- Musical career
- Genres: Secular pop music; contemporary Christian music
- Years active: 1951–2021

Ralph Carmichael (May 27, 1927 – October 18, 2021) was an American composer and arranger of both secular pop music and contemporary Christian music. He is regarded as one of the pioneers of contemporary Christian music.

== Early life and career ==
Carmichael was born in Quincy, Illinois, the son of Pentecostal ministers Richard and Adele Carmichael. As a teenager, Carmichael played violin with the San Jose Civic Symphony. At seventeen, he enrolled at Southern California Bible College (now Vanguard University) to become a preacher like his father, grandfather, three uncles, and five cousins. He started a campus men's quartet, as well as ensembles and mixed groups of all kinds, blending jazz and classical music techniques with gospel songs and hymns. His bands were unwelcomed at many churches, and he was not allowed to store his baritone saxophone on campus because of its associations with big band music.

After college, Carmichael's band received mixed reactions from the Christian community. One church asked that they hide their drums behind a curtain; a pastor in Oakland stopped the band mid-song because the music sounded too "worldly." After a performance at a men's fellowship in Pasadena, however, Carmichael's band was invited to audition for television. The TV program, The Campus Christian Hour, drew so much response mail from Christians that the station asked for more shows. It won an Emmy Award in 1950.

In 1951, Carmichael was invited to score a film for the Billy Graham Evangelistic Association. In all, he scored twenty of the BGEA's films, including the funky urban soundtrack for the 1970 film The Cross and the Switchblade. By the late 1950s, secular producers had taken notice of Carmichael's radio and film work. He was invited to assist the composer at the television sitcom I Love Lucy and was soon arranging music for that show as well as Bonanza and The Roy Rogers and Dale Evans Show and for singer Rosemary Clooney. In 1958, Carmichael was hired by producer Jack H. Harris to score his science fiction film, The Blob. With the success of the film, Carmichael was brought back to score Harris' follow-up film, 4D Man. He arranged and composed music for a Bing Crosby Christmas special television program (which prompted his denomination to strongly discourage the renewal of his ordination). He also composed and conducted the theme music for the 1965 sitcom, My Mother the Car.

Carmichael's work was noticed by Capitol Records in the late 1950s. They asked him to provide arrangements for an album of mainly sacred Christmas songs by one of the label's biggest stars, Nat King Cole. The result, The Magic of Christmas, was released for the 1960 festive season, by which time Capitol had already set Carmichael to work with Cole on more secular albums.

Carmichael duly became Cole's most regularly utilized arranger from then until the singer's death in early 1965. Their first mainstream pop collaboration was The Touch of Your Lips (also 1960), an album of romantic ballads backed by lush strings. Their final collaboration was Cole's last album, L-O-V-E. Featuring jazzy big band arrangements. It was recorded in December 1964, only two months before Cole succumbed to lung cancer, which was already in its advanced stages.

Carmichael arranged the score for the influential 1973 evangelical Christian horror film A Thief in the Night.

== Artistic style ==
Carmichael's experiments in pop-rock style Christian music in the 1960s and 1970s brought him recognition as the "Father of Contemporary Christian Music". He founded Light Records in order to widen the audience for the music of the Jesus People. He was subject to controversy from within the church, being called a heretic for his use of guitars in worship and his adaptations of Gospel songs to big band stylings.

Manna Music Inc founders, Tim and Hal Spencer, introduced Andraé Crouch to Carmichael, helping to launch Crouch's recording career. Carmichael also provided the backing for a number of RCA albums by Gospel singer George Beverly Shea, including The Love of God in 1958, and How Great Thou Art in 1969.

In 1969, Carmichael and Kurt Kaiser collaborated on Tell It Like It Is, a folk musical about God. The record album of the musical, which included the song "Pass It On", sold 2,500 copies, completely selling out the first run; it then completely sold out its second run of 100,000 copies. The Carpenters recorded Carmichael's song "Love is Surrender" on their 1970 album Close to You.

One of Carmichael's contemporary hymns, "Reach Out to Jesus", was recorded by Elvis Presley on the singer's 1972 Grammy Award-winning album of sacred songs, He Touched Me. His album Strike Up the Band won a Dove Award for "Instrumental Album of the Year" at the 25th GMA Dove Awards in 1994.

Carmichael wrote arrangements for many other top performers, including Ella Fitzgerald, Bing Crosby, Jack Jones, Peggy Lee, Julie London, Al Martino and Roger Williams. He arranged most of the carols on the 1961 Stan Kenton album A Merry Christmas!.

== Personal life ==
In 1948, Carmichael married singer Evangeline Otto; they divorced in 1964. Their daughter Carol Celeste Carmichael, later Carol Parks (1949–2010), was a vocalist and assistant record producer. He married his second wife, Marvella Price, in 1965.

Carmichael's autobiography, He's Everything to Me, was published by Word Books in 1986.

Carmichael died on October 18, 2021, in Camarillo, California. He was 94.

== Recognition ==
Carmichael was inducted into the GMA Gospel Music Hall of Fame in 1985 and into the National Religious Broadcasters' Hall of Fame in 2001.
