= Springtime in the Rockies =

1942 American musical comedy film directed by Irving Cummings

- Directed by: Irving Cummings
- Screenplay by: Walter Bullock; Ken Englund; Jacques Thery (adaptation)
- Based on: Second Honeymoon; 1936 Redbook story by Philip Wylie
- Produced by: William LeBaron; William Goetz (executive producer; uncredited)
- Starring: Betty Grable; John Payne; Carmen Miranda; Cesar Romero
- Cinematography: Ernest Palmer
- Edited by: Robert L. Simpson
- Music by: Alberto Colombo
- Distributed by: 20th Century Fox
- Release date: November 6, 1942
- Running time: 91 minutes
- Country: United States
- Language: English
- Box office: $3.5 million (United States) $240,000 (United Kingdom)

Springtime in the Rockies is an American Technicolor musical comedy film released by Twentieth Century Fox in 1942. It stars Betty Grable, with support from John Payne, Carmen Miranda, Cesar Romero, Charlotte Greenwood, and Edward Everett Horton. Also appearing were Grable's future husband Harry James and his band. The director was Irving Cummings. The screenplay was based on the short story "Second Honeymoon" by Philip Wylie.

== Plot ==
During the thirty-fourth week of their hit Broadway show, dancer Vicky Lane awaits the arrival of her partner, Dan Christy, but as usual, he is late. Vicky thinks that Dan is buying her an engagement ring and is infuriated to discover that he has been on a date with socialite Marilyn Crothers.

Fed up with Dan's womanizing and insensitivity, Vicky quits the show and returns to her former dancing partner and beau, Victor Prince, who is still in love with her.

Three months pass as Dan sinks into a depression and cannot find a backer for his new show. He sits in bars, drinking by himself. His agent, "the Commissioner", tells him that financiers Bickel and Brown will back his show, but only if he can get Vicky to return. Dan is pessimistic, for Vicky and Victor are beginning a new engagement with Harry James and His Music Makers at the Lake Louise resort in the Canadian Rockies. The Commissioner tells Dan to romance Vicky so that she will come back, and not tell her about Bickel and Brown until she arrives in New York. He then asks bartender McTavish to get the drunken Dan on the next plane to Lake Louise.

When Dan awakens sometime later, he finds himself at the Canadian resort and learns that he has hired McTavish as his valet and Rosita Murphy, who was working in the souvenir shop at the Detroit airport, as his secretary. McTavish is an eccentric whose wealthy aunt bankrolled him to several college degrees.

Dan meets Vicky, who happily shows off her engagement ring from Victor. Dan is discouraged but hits upon the scheme of making Vicky jealous by romancing Rosita. His plan appears to be working until Vicky learns the truth from Rosita, who has aroused the interest of Victor, although she prefers McTavish. Vicky's friend, Phoebe Gray, is also intrigued by McTavish, and the couples spend much time pursuing and arguing with each other.

One evening, Dan barges into Vicky's room and refuses to leave even when she summons Victor. He hides, but is discovered by Victor, who accuses Vicky of being unfaithful, and she breaks off their engagement. Later that evening, Vicky and Dan reconcile. Dan proposes marriage and promises to be honest with her. He tries to tell her about the new show, but she rushes off to plan their departure the next morning. So instead he suggests a honeymoon in New York. As she is checking out in the morning, Vicky meets the Commissioner, and Bickel and Brown, who have just arrived. They spill the beans about the show.

Thinking that Dan is using her once again, Vicky runs off in tears, but quick-thinking Rosita covers up for Dan, convincing Vicky that he intended to take her to California for their honeymoon. In the process, however, Bickel and Brown are lost as backers and Rosita must persuade McTavish to invest some of his inheritance in the show. The show opens with Vicky and Dan as the star performers, supported by Harry James, Rosita and Victor, and McTavish and Phoebe.

== Cast ==
- Betty Grable as Vicky Lane
- John Payne as Dan Christy
- Carmen Miranda as Rosita Murphy
- Cesar Romero as Victor Prince
- Charlotte Greenwood as Phoebe Gray
- Edward Everett Horton as McTavish
- Harry James as Himself
- Jackie Gleason as "the Commissioner" (uncredited)
- Chick Chandler as Stage Manager
- Iron Eyes Cody as White Cloud
- Dick Elliott as Mr. Jeepers
- Bess Flowers as Mrs. Jeepers
- Helen Forrest as Herself
- Harry Hayden as Mr. Brown
- Russell Hicks as Man in Dark with Lighter
- George Lloyd
- Dona Massin
- Carole Mathews
- Jewel McGowan
- Aloísio de Oliveira as Patrick Murphy Jr.
- Frank Orth as Mr. Bickel
- John Roche
- Mary Stuart
- Charles Tannen as Backstage Call Boy (voice)
- Margo Woode

== Production ==
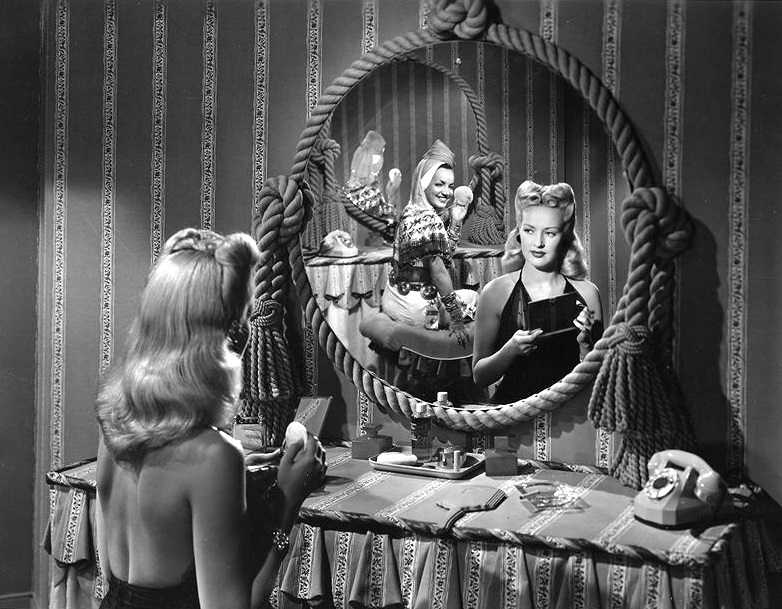
Betty Grable and Carmen Miranda in Springtime in the Rockies.

Although Wylie's story was published as "Second Honeymoon", it was purchased by Twentieth Century-Fox under the title "Worship the Sun". An article published by The Hollywood Reporter noted that Frederick Jackson was working on the picture's script, but the extent of his contribution to the completed film has not been confirmed. According to a 20 December 1941 story outline, contained in the Twentieth Century-Fox Produced Scripts Collection at the UCLA Library, Fred Astaire and Rudy Vallée were originally considered for the male leads.

According to the Records of the Legal Department, also at UCLA, the studio paid $1,000 for a waiver from Villa Moret Inc., holders of the copyright to the song "When It's Springtime in the Rockies", for the use of the title. The legal records also reveal that Twentieth Century-Fox paid approximately $1,160 to Republic Pictures, which had prior claim on the title for use on a Roy Rogers picture. That film was then released as Romance on the Range in 1942. A 22 June 1942 studio press release noted that the songs "Magazines" and "I Like to Be Loved by You", by Mack Gordon and Harry Warren, were to be included in the film, but they were not in the finished picture.

According to a The Hollywood Reporter news item, the studio intended to shoot the picture on location at Lake Louise in Canada due to "defense regulations hindering exterior shooting in the Hollywood area". Only background shots were filmed in Canada, however. "I Had the Craziest Dream", which is sung by Harry James's band singer Helen Forrest in the film, became one of Betty Grable's signature songs. Grable and James were married in 1943, and according to modern sources, they named their first-born daughter, Victoria Elizabeth, after the character Grable played in this film. The couple were divorced in 1965.

== Other versions ==
Twentieth Century-Fox first filmed Wylie's story in 1936 under the title Second Honeymoon. That picture was directed by Walter Lang and starred Tyrone Power and Loretta Young.

Donald Duck quacks a version of the song while bathing in the 1938 short Mickey's Trailer.

Grable starred with Dick Powell in the Lux Radio Theatre version of the story, broadcast on 22 May 1944.

The legal records reveal that in 1946, the studio intended to film another remake, entitled Autumn in Acapulco, but that version was never produced.

== Box office ==
Springtime in the Rockies was a big hit for Grable and for Fox: it grossed about $2 million, and was among the ten most successful films at the box office in 1942.

== Critical views ==
The New York Times wrote that "aside from the settings and stunning costumes, practically everything in Springtime in the Rockies has a drearily familiar air."

== Soundtracks ==
- Run, Little Raindrop, Run
  - Music by Harry Warren
  - Lyrics by Mack Gordon
  - Performed by Betty Grable and John Payne
- I Had the Craziest Dream
  - Music by Harry Warren
  - Lyrics by Mack Gordon
  - Played during the opening credits and often throughout the picture
- Chattanooga Choo Choo
  - Music by Harry Warren
  - Lyrics by Mack Gordon
  - Portuguese lyrics by Aloísio de Oliveira
- A Poem Set to Music
  - Music by Harry Warren
  - Lyrics by Mack Gordon
  - Performed by Harry James and His Orchestra
- O 'Tic-Tac' do Meu Coração
  - Written by Alcyr Pires Vermelho and Walfrido Silva
  - Performed by Carmen Miranda with Bando da Lua
- Pan American Jubilee
  - Music by Harry Warren
  - Lyrics by Mack Gordon
  - Portuguese lyrics by Aloysio De Oliveira
- Serenade in Blue
  - Music by Harry Warren
  - Played during the bar scene
- Two O'Clock Jump
  - Written by Count Basie, Benny Goodman and Harry James
  - Performed by Harry James and His Orchestra
- You Made Me Love You (I Didn't Want to Do It)
  - Music by James V. Monaco
  - Performed by Harry James and His Orchestra
- I, Yi, Yi, Yi, Yi (I Like You Very Much)
  - Music by Harry Warren
  - Played when Rosita is introduced
- Chica Chica Boom Chic
  - Music by Harry Warren
  - Played by the band at the restaurant
- At Last
  - Music by Harry Warren
  - Played by the band at the restaurant
- Sleepy Lagoon
  - Music by Eric Coates
  - Heard during the hotel room scene with the roses
- Ciribiribin
  - Music by A. Pestalozza
