= Gangster Squad (soundtrack) =

2013 soundtrack albums

Gangster Squad (Music from and Inspired by the Motion Picture)

Soundtrack album by various artists
- Released: January 8, 2013
- Length: 32:58
- Label: WaterTower Music

Gangster Squad (Original Motion Picture Score)

Film score by Steve Jablonsky
- Released: January 8, 2013
- Studio: The Bridge Recording, Glendale, California
- Genre: Film score
- Length: 55:44
- Label: Varèse Sarabande
- Producer: Bob Badami; Steve Jablonsky

Steve Jablonsky chronology
| Battleship (2012) | Gangster Squad (2013) | Pain & Gain (2013) |

Gangster Squad (Music from and Inspired by the Motion Picture) and Gangster Squad (Original Motion Picture Score) are the soundtracks for the 2013 film Gangster Squad directed by Ruben Fleischer starring Josh Brolin, Ryan Gosling, Emma Stone and Sean Penn. Both soundtracks were released through WaterTower Music and Varèse Sarabande labels on January 8, 2013. The first album featured songs performed by Peggy Lee, St. Vincent, Pee Wee King, Hoagy Carmichael, Delta Rae, Kitty, Daisy & Lewis, Imelda May and few songs performed by the Gangster Squad Movie Band, whereas the second album features the film score composed by Steve Jablonsky.

== Background ==
The film score was initially intended to be composed by Carter Burwell. However, due to creative differences, he was replaced by Steve Jablonsky. The score was written during the overlapped schedule where Jablonsky was handling multiple projects. For Sean Penn's character Mickey Cohen, he made a "weird sound" which Fleischer liked and did "strange things" to create the pulsing sound. The score was considered to be different from his loud and bombastic works for the Transformers film series, as Fleischer intended for a "muted and understated" sound to provide a cool and tough vibe, while being era-appropriate.

== Release ==
The film's soundtrack and score album was released through WaterTower Music and Varèse Sarabande labels on January 8, 2013.

== Reception ==
Peter Debruge of Variety described it as a "might-makes-right music". James Southall of Movie Wave wrote: "This is the type of film that can inspire good music (even in more recent times Mark Isham managed to produce the outstanding The Black Dahlia – and a few hints here and there suggest it too may have been in the temp track) but in the creativity-sapped world of Remote Control Productions, that was never very likely, and while the album is far from unlistenable, pretty much all of it sounds like a thin retread of something better – so all it's likely to do is inspire you to listen to one of those scores instead."

Chris Bumbray of JoBlo.com found Jablonsky's score being "Hans Zimmer-ish". Amon Warmann of WhatCulture wrote: "Steve Jablonsky's score is perfectly attuned to each scene." Nick Pinkerton of Houston Press wrote: "each fresh bloodletting hyped by Steve Jablonsky's score or peppy period tunes counterpoised for ironic effect." Barry Paris of Pittsburgh Post-Gazette wrote: "Steve Jablonsky's good score helps cover the warmed-over "Bonnie and Clyde" slo-mo massacres and similar stuff stolen from "L.A. Confidential" (1997) — a high-speed chase in Packards! — leading up to the orgiastic final armageddon in which both sides are better armed than al-Qaida."

== Track listing ==
| No. | Title | Artist(s) | Length |
|---|---|---|---|
| 1. | "The Hills of California" | Johnny Mercer and The Pied Pipers | 2:30 |
| 2. | "Mr. Five by Five" | Imelda May | 3:00 |
| 3. | "Early Autumn" | The Gangster Squad Movie Band | 3:24 |
| 4. | "Chicken Shack Boogie" | Delandis and The Gangster Squad Movie Band | 2:32 |
| 5. | "Bull Fiddle Boogie" | Pee Wee King | 2:37 |
| 6. | "A Little Bird Told Me" | Kitty, Daisy & Lewis | 2:32 |
| 7. | "Big Jay's Hop / Blow Blow Blow" | Big Jay McNeely | 2:36 |
| 8. | "Chica Chica Boom Chic" | Sharmila Guha and the Gangster Squad Movie Band | 2:24 |
| 9. | "Ole Buttermilk Sky" | Hoagy Carmichael | 2:16 |
| 10. | "Bless You (For the Good That's in You)" | Peggy Lee | 2:53 |
| 11. | "Early Autumn" | St. Vincent | 3:26 |
| 12. | "Bless You (For the Good That's in You)" | Delta Rae | 2:48 |
| Total length: | | | 32:58 |

Gangster Squad (Original Motion Picture Score) track listing
| No. | Title | Length |
|---|---|---|
| 1. | "His Name Is Mickey Cohen" | 2:27 |
| 2. | "Welcome To Los Angeles" | 3:12 |
| 3. | "He Can't Have You" | 1:39 |
| 4. | "War for the Soul of LA" | 2:48 |
| 5. | "There Goes Our Ride" | 1:14 |
| 6. | "You Can't Shoot Me" | 3:51 |
| 7. | "Always Knew I'd Die in Burbank" | 2:28 |
| 8. | "You're Talking to God" | 0:50 |
| 9. | "The Bug" | 2:17 |
| 10. | "Hot Potato with a Grenade" | 3:18 |
| 11. | "You Know the Drill" | 1:06 |
| 12. | "I Was Just Hopin' to Take You to Bed" | 1:30 |
| 13. | "Kill 'Em All" | 1:58 |
| 14. | "Chinatown" | 4:28 |
| 15. | "Keeler" | 2:18 |
| 16. | "Connie Lives" | 1:53 |
| 17. | "Let's Finish It" | 2:25 |
| 18. | "Union Station" | 1:34 |
| 19. | "Light 'Em Up" | 7:28 |
| 20. | "The City of Angels" | 4:03 |
| 21. | "Gangster Squad" | 2:57 |
| Total length: | | 55:44 |

== Personnel ==
Credits adapted from liner notes:

- Music composer – Steve Jablonsky
- Producer – Bob Badami, Steve Jablonsky
- Music programming – Jacob Shea, Matthew Margeson, Nathan Whitehead
- Recording and mixing – Jeff Biggers
- Mastering – Patricia Sullivan
- Music supervisor – Steven Baker
- Music coordinator – Erick DeVore
- Music preparation – Booker White
- Executive producer – Robert Townson
- Pro-tools operators – Kevin Globerman, Lori Castro
- Executives in charge of music for Warner Bros. Pictures – Carter Armstrong, Paul Broucek
- Contract administrator – Megan Wintory

Orchestra

- Performer – Hollywood Studio Symphony
- Orchestrations – Bruce L. Fowler, Carl Rydlund, Rick Giovinazzo, Walter Fowler, Yvonne Suzette Moriarty
- Conductor – Nick Glennie-Smith
- Contractor – Peter Rotter
- Concertmaster – Belinda Broughton

Instruments

- Bass – Drew Dembowski, Edward Meares, Michael Valerio, Nico Abondolo
- Bassoon – Judith Farmer, Rose Corrigan
- Cello – Andrew Shulman, Armen Ksajikian, Cecilia Tsan, Dennis Karmazyn, Paula Hochhalter, Steve Richards, Timothy Landauer, Steve Erdody
- Clarinet – Daniel Higgins, Ralph Williams, Stuart Clark
- Guitar – George Doering
- Harmonica – Tommy Morgan
- Horn – Allen Fogle, Anna Bosler, Brad Warnaar, Brian O'Connor, David Everson, Jenny Kim, Joseph Meyer, Mark Adams, Phillip Edward Yao, Steven Becknell, Yvonne Suzette Moriarty, James Thatcher
- Percussion – Brian Kilgore
- Saxophone – Dan Higgins
- Trombone – Alexander Iles, William Reichenbach, Phillip Teele, Steven Holtman, William Booth, Charles Loper
- Tuba – Doug Tornquist, Gary Hickman
- Viola – Andrew Duckles, Maria Newman, Robert Becker, Robert Brophy, Shawn Mann, Victoria Miskolczy, Brian Dembow
- Violin – Bruce Dukov, Charlie Bisharat, Darius Campo, Helen Nightengale, Josefina Vergara, Julie Gigante, Katia Popov, Lisa Sutton, Phillip Levy, Roger Wilkie, Serena Mc Kinney, Tamara Hatwan
