= Undecided =

Song by John Kirby and The Onyx Club Boys
- Published: 1938
- Composer: Charlie Shavers
- Lyricist: Sid Robin

"Undecided" is a popular song written by Sid Robin with music by Charlie Shavers and published in 1938.

== Recordings ==
- The first recording was made by John Kirby and The Onyx Club Boys on October 28, 1938, and released by Decca Records as catalog number 2216, with the B-side, "From A Flat to C".
- It was also recorded by Chick Webb and his Orchestra with vocal by Ella Fitzgerald on February 17, 1939, and released by Decca Records as catalog number 2323, with the B-side, "In the Groove at the Grove".
- The Dandridge Sisters recorded a cover in July 1939, and Django Reinhardt recorded a version with Quintette du Hot Club de France, and Beryl Davis on vocals, in August of the same year.
- The biggest hit version was recorded by The Ames Brothers with Les Brown's orchestra on June 25, 1951, and released by Coral Records as catalog number 60566, with the B-side, "Sentimental Journey". It first reached the Billboard chart on September 28, 1951, and lasted 20 weeks on the chart, peaking at number 6.
- Also in 1951, a bebop treatment of the song was released by Gene Ammons. Billy May recorded the song as part of his 1955 album Arthur Murray Cha Cha Mambos.
- In 1960, Harry James released a version on his album, Harry James...Today. (MGM E-3848)
- Al Hirt released a version on his 1961 album, The Greatest Horn in the World.
- Natalie Cole recorded the song for her 1993 album, Take a Look.
