= A Band Is Born =

Studio album by Billy May
- Released: 1952
- Recorded: 1952
- Genre: Jazz, traditional pop
- Label: Capitol H-349

Billy May chronology
Join the Band (1948)	A Band Is Born (1952)	Billy May's Bacchanalia! (1953)

A Band Is Born is a 1952 album by the arranger and composer Billy May.

== Reception ==
The Billboard magazine review from April 20, 1957, upon the album's reissue commented that "dealers can expect many buys from fans who favor the distinctive May style".

== Track listing ==
1. "Charmaine" (Erno Rapee, Lew Pollack)
2. "Lean, Baby" (Billy May)
3. "Unforgettable" (Irving Gordon)
4. "Fat Man Boogie" (May)
5. "There Is No Greater Love" (Isham Jones, Marty Symes)
6. "I Guess I'll Have to Change My Plan" (Arthur Schwartz, Howard Dietz)
7. "Mayhem" (May)
8. "When My Sugar Walks Down the Street" (Gene Austin, Irving Mills, Jimmy McHugh)
- Tracks on 1957 reissue:
1. "All of Me" (Gerald Marks, Seymour Simons)
2. "My Silent Love" (Edward Heyman, Dana Suesse)
3. "Lulu's Back In Town" (Al Dubin, Harry Warren)
4. "If I Had You" (Jimmy Campbell, Reginald Connelly, Ted Shapiro)

== Personnel ==
- Billy May – arranger
- Alvin Stoller – vocals on "Fat Man Boogie"
