= Mañana (Is Soon Enough for Me) =

Song

"Mañana (Is Soon Enough for Me)" is a popular song that was written by Peggy Lee and her first husband Dave Barbour and published in 1947. Peggy Lee recorded the song on November 25, 1947, with Dave Barbour's orchestra as backing. Released by Capitol Records (catalog number 15022), it became her biggest chart hit. For the week ending January 23, 1948, the single entered Billboard's Best Sellers chart, where it spent 21 weeks, nine of those at number one.

== Background ==
Mañana is Spanish for "tomorrow" (though it also means "morning"). The theme of the humorous song is the singer wanting to put off urgent tasks until the next day. The song is typically performed with stereotypical Hispanic accents, and with a Latin flavor to the backup band. Lee's autobiography emphasized that the song was her portrait of a single happy-go-lucky individual, written during a relaxing Mexican vacation, and she regretted that some listeners perceived it as cultural mockery.

== Notable covers ==
The following artists have covered the song:

- The Mills Brothers recorded the song on December 31, 1947 for Decca Records (catalog No. 24333) They recorded it again for their album Great Hits - Vol. 2 (1960)
- Billy May, on his 1955 album Arthur Murray Cha Cha Mambos
- Gary Crosby on his album The Happy Bachelor (1960)
- The Four Freshmen, on the 1961 album Voices in Fun
- Dean Martin for his album Dino Latino (1962)

== In popular culture ==
- Olga San Juan (1956 on The Rosemary Clooney Show)
- In Jack Kerouac's novel On the Road, the narrator, Sal Paradise, describes the shack where his Mexican girlfriend's family lives and quotes some of the lyrics: "The window she is broken and the rain she is coming in". He also mentions how his girlfriend's brother is always "putting off everything till mañana."
- In "The Merchant of Korea" (episode 14, season 6 of M*A*S*H), Winchester sings "Mañana" after playing poker all night (and losing).
- In the Seinfeld episode "The Blood", Kramer and Newman listen to jazz organist Jackie Davis' instrumental version of the song while making sausages in Jerry's apartment, and again while driving Kramer's blood to the blood bank.
- In Australia in the early 1990s, a version of the song was used as a jingle in commercials for bananas, as "Bananas Are Good Enough For Me".
- In the 1990 movie The Shrimp on the Barbie, "Mañana" is the song in the closing credits, performed by The Herbs.
