= I Know Why (And So Do You) =

1941 sheet music cover featuring Glenn Miller, Leo Feist, New York.

1941 78 single release by Glenn Miller and His Orchestra, RCA Bluebird B-11230-A.

"I Know Why (And So Do You)" is a 1941 song recorded by Glenn Miller and His Orchestra. The song appeared in the 20th Century Fox film Sun Valley Serenade. The song was released as an RCA Bluebird 78 single.

== Background ==
The song was written by Mack Gordon, lyrics, and Harry Warren, music. The song is lip-synched by Lynn Bari in the movie Sun Valley Serenade. Pat Friday sang the vocals with John Payne and The Modernaires. The single, RCA Bluebird B-11230-A, reached no. 18 on the Billboard pop singles chart in a one-week chart run. The single release featured vocals by Paula Kelly and The Four Modernaires. The B side of the single was "Chattanooga Choo Choo" which, de facto, was treated as the A-side.

The tune was the one being rehearsed in the film, The Glenn Miller Story, when Jimmy Stewart, as Glenn Miller, was trying to invent a new sound; then the trumpeter hurt his lip, which caused Miller to substitute a clarinet, creating the new sound.

Covers of the song have been recorded by numerous artists, including The Manhattan Transfer, Mel Torme, Richard Himber And His Orchestra with Johnny Johnston and the Joseph Lilley Ensemble on vocals, Ray Anthony, Anne Shelton with Ambrose & his Orchestra, June Christy, Frankie Sardo on 20th Fox Records, Lionel Hampton, Jean Peters, Joan Regan, Michael Feinstein and George Shearing, Babik Reinhardt, Dick Smothers, the Red Garland Trio, Orchestra Coco, the Michael Rose Orchestra, Teddy Petersen, Falconaires, US Air Force Band of the Rockies, Max Greger, Syd Lawrence, the Dino Olivieri Orchestra with refrain by Bruno Pallesi, David Pell, Diana Panton with Red Schwager on the album Red, and Robert Clary.

The 1941 Glenn Miller recording was featured in the 1990 Warner Bros. movie Memphis Belle and the 2017 film The Shape of Water which was nominated for 13 Academy Awards. It also was played at Ginger Rogers' party early in the 1954 movie "Black Widow. It's also featured in a film called The Magnificent Dope (1942) starring Henry Fonda, Lynn Bari, Don Ameche and Edward Everett Horton.

== Personnel ==
The personnel on the 1941 recording by Glenn Miller and his Orchestra released as a 78 single were: Paula Kelly, The Modernaires (vo), Billy May, John Best, Ray Anthony, R.D. McMickle (tp), Glenn Miller, Jim Priddy, Paul Tanner, Frank D'Annolfo (tb), Hal McIntyre, Wilbur Schwartz (cl, as), Tex Beneke, Al Klink (ts), Ernie Caceres (bar), J.C. McGregor (p), Jack Lathrop (g), Trigger Alpert (sb), and Maurice Purtill (dm).

The version used in the 1941 film Sun Valley Serenade features lead vocals by Pat Friday (and a verse by star John Payne) once again backed by The Modernaires.

== Album appearances ==
The song appears on the following albums:

- Remember Glenn Miller, 20th Century, 1973
- The Complete Glenn Miller, Vol. 6 (1940-1941), RCA Bluebird
- Glenn Miller: The Popular Recordings (1938-1942), RCA Bluebird, 1989
- The Ultimate Glenn Miller, RCA Bluebird, 1993
- The Essential Glenn Miller, RCA Bluebird, 1995

== Sources ==
- Flower, John (1972). Moonlight Serenade: a bio-discography of the Glenn Miller Civilian Band. New Rochelle, NY: Arlington House. ISBN 0-87000-161-2.
- Miller, Glenn (1943). Glenn Miller's Method for Orchestral Arranging. New York: Mutual Music Society. ASIN: B0007DMEDQ
- Simon, George Thomas (1980). Glenn Miller and His Orchestra. New York: Da Capo paperback. ISBN 0-306-80129-9.
- Simon, George Thomas (1971). Simon Says. New York: Galahad. ISBN 0-88365-001-0.
- Schuller, Gunther (1991). Volume 2 of The Swing Era:the Development of Jazz, 1930–1945 /. New York: Oxford University Press. ISBN 0-19-507140-9.
