= Boomshot =

Boomshot or Boom Shot may refer to:

== Music ==
- "Boom Shot", 1942 song composed by Glenn Miller and Billy May
- "Boom Shot", 1987 song by Cutty Ranks
- Boom Shot, 1991 album by Gregory Isaacs

== Other uses ==
- "Boomshots" (magazine segment), a column in the magazine Vibe (magazine)
- a filmmaking technique using a boom arm, also called a crane shot
