= Cha Cha de Amor =

Studio album by Dean Martin
- Released: November 5, 1962
- Recorded: December 18–20, 1961, 1750 N. Vine Street, Hollywood, California, United States of America
- Genres: Vocal jazz, traditional pop, cha-cha-chá Latin jazz
- Length: 30:29
- Label: Capitol
- Producer: Dave Cavanaugh

Dean Martin chronology
French Style (1962)	Cha Cha de Amor (1962)	Dino Latino (1962)

Professional ratings
Review scores
Source	Rating
Allmusic	2.5/5 stars
New Record Mirror	4/5 stars

Cha Cha de Amor is the ninth studio album by Italian-American singer and actor Dean Martin for Capitol Records, released on November 5, 1962. After recording these sessions, Martin joined Frank Sinatra's Reprise Records label. This album's songs were recorded between December 18 and December 20 of 1961. Cha Cha de Amor was released on November 5, 1962 (see 1962 in music). The backing orchestra was conducted and arranged by Nelson Riddle. The album consists of twelve songs built upon an "authentic Afro-Cuban rhythm section."

== Track listing ==
=== LP ===
Capitol Records Catalog Number (S) T-1702 |

==== Side A ====
Track	Song title	Written by	Recording date	Session information	Time
1.	"Somebody Loves You"	Peter deRose and Charles Tobias	December 20, 1961	Session 10427; Master 36948	2:34
2.	"My One and Only Love"	Guy Wood and Robert Mellin	December 19, 1961	Session 10419; Master 36921	2:29
3.	"Love (Your Magic Spell Is Everywhere)"	Edmund Goulding and Elsie Janis	December 18, 1961	Session 10417; Master 36853	2:25
4.	"I Wish You Love"	Charles Trenet and Albert Askew Beach	December 19, 1961	Session 10419; Master 36922	2:24
5.	"Cha Cha Cha D'Amour (Melodie d'Amour)"	Leo Johns and Henri Salvador	December 18, 1961	Session 10417; Master 36854	2:18
6.	"A Hundred Years from Today"	Victor Young, Joseph Young and Ned Washington	December 20, 1961	Session 10427; Master 36949	2:41

==== Side B ====
Track	Song title	Written by	Recording date	Session information	Time
1.	"I Love You Much Too Much"	Don Raye, Alex Olshanetsky and Chaim Towber	December 19, 1961	Session 10419; Master 36898	2:33
2.	"(I Love You) For Sentimental Reasons"	William 'Pat' Best and Deek Watson	December 20, 1961	Session 10427; Master 36947	2:21
3.	"Let Me Love You Tonight"	René Touzet and Mitchell Parish	December 20, 1961	Session 10419; Master 36899	2:21
4.	"Amor"	Gabriel Ruíz and Sunny Skylar	December 18, 1961	Session 10417; Master 36879	3:10
5.	"Two Loves Have I	Vincent Scotto, Georges Koger, Henri Eugene Vantard, Jack Murray and Barry Trivers	December 18, 1961	Master 36887	2:09
6.	"If Love Is Good To Me"	Fred Spielman and Redd Evans	December 20, 1961	Session 10427; Master 36946	3:04

=== Compact Disc ===
1997 EMI/Capitol combined Cha Cha de Amor with Dino: Italian Love Songs (also from 1962). Catalog Number 7243 8 55393 2 9.

==== 2005 Collectors' Choice Music reissue ====
The 2005 Collectors' Choice Music reissue added four more tracks to the twelve tracks on the original Capitol LP. Catalog Number WWCCM06062.

Track	Song title	Written by	Recording date	Session information	Time
1.	"Vieni Su (Say You Love Me, Too!)"	Johnny Cola	March 3, 1950	Session 1451; Master 4874-5	2:40
2.	"I Passed Your House Tonight"	Lew Spence and Don Raye	April 8, 1952	Session 2567; Master 9937-3	2:56
3.	"Wham! Bam! Thank You, Ma'am!"	Hank Penny	July 31, 1950	Session 1870; Master 6469-4	2:49
4.	"The Peddler's Serenade"	Jimmy Eaton, J.J. Corvo and Paul McGrane	July 31, 1950	Session 1870; Master 6470-4	2:47

== Personnel ==
- Dean Martin: Vocals
- Nelson Riddle: Leader
- Sol Klein: Contractor
- Alton R. 'Al' Hendrickson: Guitar (Sessions 10419 and 10427)
- Tony Reyes: Bass
- Fred O. Aguirre: Drums
- Carlos Mejia: Drums
- Ramon R. Rivera: Drums
- Edward 'Eddie' Cano: Piano
- Kermit 'Ken' Lane: Piano
- Victor Gottlieb: Cello (Session 10419)
- Armand Kaproff: Cello (Session 10419)
- Eleanor Aller Slatkin: Cello (Session 10419)
- Alvin Dinkin: Viola (Session 10419)
- Virginia Majewski: Viola (Session 10419)
- Barbara Simons: Viola (Session 10419)
- Victor Arno: Violin (Session 10419)
- Victor Bay: Violin (Session 10419)
- Alex Beller: Violin (Session 10419)
- David Frisina: Violin (Session 10419)
- James Getzoff: Violin (Session 10419)
- Ben 'Benny' Gill: Violin (Session 10419)
- Daniel 'Dan' Lube: Violin (Session 10419)
- Erno Neufeld: Violin (Session 10419)
- Nathan Ross: Violin (Session 10419)
- Felix Slatkin: Violin (Session 10419)
- Gene Cipriano: Saxophone (Sessions 10417 and 10427)
- Dale Issenhuth: Saxophone (Session 10417)
- Justin Gordon: Saxophone (Session 10427)
- Harry G. Klee: Saxophone
- Joseph J. Koch: Saxophone (Session 10417)
- Wilbur Schwartz: Saxophone (Sessions 10417 and 10427)
- Carroll Lewis: Trumpet (Sessions 10417 and 10427)
- Henry Miranda: Trumpet (Sessions 10417 and 10427)
- Al Rojo: Trumpet (Sessions 10417 and 10427)
- Clarence F. 'Shorty' Sherlock: Trumpet (Sessions 10417 and 10427)
