= Dino Latino =

Studio album by Dean Martin
- Released: October 1962
- Recorded: 1962
- Genre: Latin jazz
- Length: 25:03
- Label: Reprise

Dean Martin chronology
Cha Cha de Amor (1962)	Dino Latino (1962)	Dean "Tex" Martin: Country Style (1963)

Dino Latino is the tenth studio album by Dean Martin, released in October 1962. It was recorded during August 1962, the album is a collection of Latin standards and popular songs composed in the same vein.

== Description ==
While the A-side of the record features five uptempo songs (among them are "Mañana" (popularized by Peggy Lee) and "South of the Border", which he later re-recorded for the soundtrack of The Silencers), B-Side consists of five ballads. All songs on the album were arranged and conducted by Don Costa, except for the closing track, "La Paloma", which is credited to Chuck Sagle.

== Releases ==
Originally released on Frank Sinatra's Reprise label as LP R(S)-6054 ('S' distinguishing the stereo pressing), the album's tracks made their CD debut as part of the Bear Family box set Everybody Loves Somebody (BCD 16343). A subsequent two-on-one CD (together with Dean Martin's preceding album French Style) by Collectors' Choice restored the original running order.

In early 2014, Martin's entire 1962-1974 Reprise catalogue was acquired by Legacy Recordings, a division of Sony Music. Legacy stated they intended to perform album reissues, Dino Latino among them. The deal also included Martin's final album The Nashville Sessions, recorded 1983 for Warners Music.

== Track listing ==
=== Side A ===
Track	Song title	Written by	Recording date	Session information	Time
1.	"(Alla En) El Rancho Grande"	Silvano R. Ramos and Bartley Costello	August 28, 1962		2:18
2.	"Mañana (Is Soon Enough for Me)"	Peggy Lee and Dave Barbour	August 28, 1962		2:33
3.	"Tangerine"	Victor Schertzinger and Johnny Mercer	August 28, 1962		2:06
4.	"South of the Border"	Jimmy Kennedy and Michael Carr	August 28, 1962		1:52
5.	"In a Little Spanish Town"	Mabel Wayne, Sam M. Lewis and Joe Young	August 28, 1962		2:33

=== Side B ===
Track	Song title	Written by	Recording date	Session information	Time
1.	"What a Diff'rence a Day Made"	Maria Grever and Stanley Adams	August 29, 1962		2:46
2.	"Magic Is the Moonlight"	Grever and Charles Pasquale	August 29, 1962		2:38
3.	"Always in My Heart"	Ernesto Lecuona and Kim Gannon	August 29, 1962		2:46
4.	"Bésame Mucho"	Consuelo Velasquez and Sunny Skylar	August 29, 1962		2:27
5.	"La Paloma"	Sebastián Iradier	August 30, 1962		3:04
