= Boom Shot =

1959 Top Rank/20th Fox 45 single, 45-JAR 114A

Boom Shot is a 1942 song composed by Glenn Miller and Billy May for the 20th Century Fox movie Orchestra Wives starring George Montgomery and Ann Rutherford.

Billy May is credited as his first wife, Arletta May, because he had signed an exclusive composer's contract with Charlie Barnet that prohibited him from writing anything for Miller under his own name. The song was published by Mutual Music Society in the U.S. and by Chappell and Company in the UK.

Though uncredited on the film soundtrack, "Boom Shot" appears in the movie Orchestra Wives twice, first as a 78 by Gene Morrison and His Orchestra on the Wurlitzer jukebox in the soda shop, then during the outdoor concert scene featuring Harry Morgan and Ann Rutherford dancing. Glenn Miller as Gene Morrison is shown conducting his orchestra on the bandstand. The title comes from the wide-angle, mobile camera shot used to film the scene, known as a boom shot. The arrangement is by George Williams.

== Recordings ==
"Boom Shot" first appeared on the 1958 20th Century Fox LP Original Film Sound Tracks, TCF 100-2

"Boom Shot" was first released on the 1958 gatefold, double LP released by Twentieth Century Fox entitled Original Film Sound Tracks by Glenn Miller and His Orchestra, TCF 100–2, which featured music from both the Orchestra Wives and Sun Valley Serenade movies. "Boom Shot" also appeared on the reissued albums Glenn Miller's Original Film Sound Tracks as Fox-3020, 3021, TFS-3020e, 3021e, in two volumes, which was reissued in 2009 by Hallmark. It is also on the 2000 Jasmine CD Glenn Miller On Film, Remember Glenn: Selections from the Sound Tracks of Sun Valley Serenade and Orchestra Wives, 20th Century, T-904, and the 2008 Acrobat Music CD On the Alamo. The song also appeared on the 1973 two disc set Remember Glenn on 20th Century Records.

In May, 1959, "Boom Shot" was released as a 7" 45 A side single by the British Top Rank label with "You Say the Sweetest Things, Baby" by the Glenn Miller Six as JAR-114. The single was also released as a 78. A 45 disc jockey promotional single was also released in the U.S. on the 20th Fox label in December, 1958 as 45–122.

"Boom Shot" features a trumpet solo by Johnny Best, which is edited out in the film, with Billy May on muted trumpet, Ernie Caceres on alto saxophone, and Glenn Miller on trombone. The instrumental is Score 735 in the Glenn Miller library of scores, in Folder 747.

1958 U.S. 20th Fox 45 single release

Ray McKinley and the New Glenn Miller Orchestra recorded the song as "Boomshot" on the 1959 RCA Victor LP album Dance Anyone?, LPM-2193. The Jack Million Band recorded it on the 2008 album In the Mood for Glenn Miller, Vol. 2. The 1959 recording appeared on the 2002 Best of New Glenn Miller Orchestra in 2002 on BMG. The Glenn Miller Orchestra under Musical Director Larry O'Brien released a recording on the album On the Air, (CD, 2002, XM Radio). A new recording by the Glenn Miller Orchestra conducted by Wil Salden appeared on the 2005 album Meets the Giants of Jazz, Swing and Entertainment on Koch/Universal. The 1959 recording featured on Dance Anyone? by Ray McKinley and The Glenn Miller Orchestra was released on CD on Montpellier.

The Glenn Miller Orchestra featured "Boom Shot" in their concert setlist for the 2022 summer tour. They also performed the song at the Glenn Miller Birthplace Society concert in Clarinda, Iowa.

== Sources ==
- Flower, John. Moonlight Serenade: A Bio-discography of the Glenn Miller Civilian Band. New Rochelle, NY: Arlington House, 1972.
- Simon, George Thomas. Simon Says. New York: Galahad, 1971. ISBN 0-88365-001-0.
- Simon, George T. Glenn Miller and His Orchestra, Da Capo Press, 1980. ISBN 0-306-80129-9.
