= Orchestra Wives =

1942 film by Archie Mayo

- 1942 Theatrical poster
- Directed by: Archie Mayo
- Screenplay by: Karl Tunberg; Darrell Ware
- Story by: James Prindle
- Produced by: William LeBaron
- Starring: George Montgomery; Ann Rutherford; Lynn Bari; Cesar Romero; Carole Landis
- Cinematography: Lucien Ballard
- Edited by: Robert Bischoff
- Music by: Alfred Newman; Harry Warren; Mack Gordon
- Production company: Twentieth Century Fox
- Distributed by: Twentieth Century Fox
- Release date: September 4, 1942
- Running time: 98 minutes
- Language: English
- Box office: $1.3 million (US rentals)

Orchestra Wives is a 1942 American musical film by 20th Century Fox directed by Archie Mayo and starring Ann Rutherford, George Montgomery, and Glenn Miller. Lynn Bari, Carole Landis, and Cesar Romero appear in support.

The film was the second (and last) film to feature The Glenn Miller Orchestra, and is notable among the many swing era musicals because its plot is more serious and realistic than the insubstantial storylines that were typical of the genre. The movie was re-released in 1954 by 20th Century Fox to tie-in with the biopic The Glenn Miller Story.

== Plot ==
Connie Ward is a young woman who on the spur of the moment marries Bill Abbott, a trumpet player in Gene Morrison's swing band. She soon finds herself at odds with the cattiness and petty jealousies of the other band members' spouses, as they accompany their husbands on their cross-country train tour. Her discomfort is exacerbated by a flirtation between Abbott and Jaynie, the band's female vocalist. When Ward eventually walks out on Abbott, their split releases so many other tensions among the musicians and their wives, that leader Morrison is forced to break up the orchestra. Ward and the band's pianist Sinjin then work behind the scenes to reunite the band, which also produces a reconciliation between Ward and Abbott (with additional help from Connie's father).

== Cast ==
Actor/Actress	Role
Ann Rutherford	Connie Ward / Connie Abbott
George Montgomery	Bill Abbott
Glenn Miller	Gene Morrison
Lynn Bari	Jaynie
Carole Landis	Natalie
Cesar Romero	Sinjin
Virginia Gilmore	Elsie
Glenn Miller Orchestra	Gene Morrison Orchestra
The Modernaires	Themselves
The Nicholas Brothers	Themselves
Ray Eberle	Himself
Bobby Hackett	Himself
Jackie Gleason (uncredited)	Ben Back
Harry Morgan (uncredited)	Cully Anderson
Dale Evans (uncredited)	Hazel

== Production ==
The working title of this film was 'Orchestra Wife'.

Production dates were 6–17 April; 22 April – early June 1942.

An early draft of the film's screenplay was rejected by the PCA because it implied that some of the characters had committed adultery. After PCA officials met with producer William LeBaron in mid-June 1942, the story was approved on the condition that there would be no adultery explicitly depicted.

'Orchestra Wives' was the second and final film made by famed band leader Glenn Miller, who disbanded his orchestra in September 1942 in order to enter the military.

A July 8, 1942, Variety news item reported that the song "At Last," composed by Mack Gordon and Harry Warren, had originally been recorded by Miller and his orchestra for the 1941 Twentieth Century-Fox film Sun Valley Serenade.

Studio records indicate that the Gordon and Warren song "That's Sabotage" was recorded for Orchestra Wives and was included on the soundtrack album, even though it does not appear in the completed picture.

Instrumental versions of "You Say The Sweetest Things, Baby" and "The Darktown Strutters' Ball" were also to have been recorded for the film, but were cut.

Three future movie and television stars have uncredited appearances: Jackie Gleason portrays the band's bass player, Ben Beck; Harry Morgan is the soda-jerk Cully Anderson, who initially dates Connie Ward (Ann Rutherford); and Dale Evans plays Ann Rutherford's friend Hazel. Singer Pat Friday dubbed Lynn Bari's vocals, as she had done in Sun Valley Serenade. George Montgomery's on-screen trumpet playing was actually performed on the soundtrack by Miller sideman Johnny Best. Glenn Miller Orchestra pianist Chummy MacGregor dubbed Cesar Romero's playing. Miller bassist Doc Goldberg dubbed Jackie Gleason's playing.

Harry Morgan would co-star in the film The Glenn Miller Story in 1953, portraying MacGregor.

=== Music ===
Orchestra Wives features several songs by Mack Gordon and Harry Warren, the same team responsible for the hits featured in Miller's first film, Sun Valley Serenade (1941). The main production number is "(I've Got a Gal in) Kalamazoo", a companion piece to "Chattanooga Choo-Choo" from the first film, that features a folksy vocal and virtuoso tenor saxophone playing by Tex Beneke, backup singing by Marion Hutton with the Modernaires, and a spectacular song and dance sequence by the Nicholas Brothers, accompanied in the uncut version of the film by Dorothy Dandridge both singing and dancing. Bosley Crowther of The New York Times regarded the latter medley of orchestra, singing, and dancing, as "the best of the numbers”, affirmed by its nomination for a Best Music, Original Song Academy Award.

Other songs include the World War II-era period piece "People Like You and Me", a breakneck performance of "Bugle Call Rag", and the melancholy romantic ballads "At Last" (originally intended for Sun Valley Serenade) and "Serenade in Blue". The film score uses "At Last" as a musical motif laced throughout the movie in dramatic and romantic scenes. "That's Sabotage" was also written for the movie but was cut from the film. The song was, however, released as a 78 single by Glenn Miller and His Orchestra, and the unused soundtrack recording was featured on various LP compilations of Miller's soundtracks.

Glenn Miller's theme song "Moonlight Serenade" from 1939 also appears over the opening credits.

"Boom Shot", an instrumental composed by Glenn Miller and Billy May for the movie, appears, first on the jukebox in the soda shop, then later when Ann Rutherford and Harry Morgan are shown dancing, but is uncredited on the soundtrack and film credits.

Montgomery's trumpet playing on the soundtrack was performed by Johnny Best, Glenn Miller's lead trumpet player. Home Media * VHS 1991 DVD

== Award nominations ==
Academy Awards

- Nominated: Best Music, Original Song, "I've Got a Gal in Kalamazoo", Harry Warren (music), Mack Gordon (lyrics) (1943)

== See also ==
- Kalamazoo, Michigan
- List of American films of 1942
