= Arthur Murray Cha Cha Mambos =

Studio album by Billy May's Rico Mambo Orchestra
- Released: 1955
- Genre: Latin jazz, lounge music
- Label: Capitol T578

Billy May chronology
Naughty Operetta (1955)	Arthur Murray Cha Cha Mambos (1955)	Jimmy Lunceford in Hi-Fi (1957)

Arthur Murray Cha Cha Mambos is an album released by Billy May in 1955 on Capitol LP record T578 and 45 rpm EP sets EAP-578 and ECF-578.

== Background ==
This album was one of a series of records released in conjunction by Capitol Records and Arthur Murray Studios featuring various dance rhythms performed by top orchestras and bands of the mid-1950s. It features songs commonly associated with Latin America, as well as a couple of pop standards and several Billy May original compositions.

== Reception ==
Professional ratings
Review scores
Source	Rating
Billboard	4/5 stars

In its review in 1955, Billboard Magazine gave the album a rating of 77, noting the recording was infused with warmth and humor. Although inherently marketed to dancers (included in the album was a coupon redeemable for two Arthur Murray studio lessons), the reviewer noted that it is a listenable collection for non-dancers as well.

== Track listing ==
1. "Frenesi" (Alberto Dominguez)
2. "Ain't She Sweet" (Milton Ager, Jack Yellen)
3. "The Cha Cha Cha" (Billy May, Bill Olofson)
4. "Adios" (Enric Madriguera)
5. "Mañana" (Dave Barbour, Peggy Lee)
6. "Cha Cha Bamer" (May)
7. "Undecided" (Charlie Shavers, Sid Robin)
8. "Ya Ya Ya Cha Cha Cha" (May)
9. "The Peanut Vendor" (Moisés Simons)
10. "Culiacan" (May)
11. "Mama Inez" (Eliseo Grenet, L. Wolfe Gilbert)
12. "Taboo" (Margarita Lecuona)
