= French Style =

Studio album by Dean Martin
- Released: 1962
- Recorded: February 1962
- Genres: Traditional pop, lounge music
- Length: 35:36
- Label: Reprise

Dean Martin chronology
Dino: Italian Love Songs (1962)	French Style (1962)	Cha Cha de Amor (1962)

French Style is the eighth studio album by Dean Martin. It was Martin’s first LP for Reprise Records. Recorded during February 1962, it features French-themed popular songs and chansons arranged by Neal Hefti. Among them "C'est si bon," which frequently appears on Dean Martin compilation albums; a rendition of Edith Piaf's classic "La Vie en rose"; the title song from the MGM classic Gigi; and two classic Cole Porter tunes. Originally released as Reprise LP R(S)-6021 ('S' distinguishing the stereo pressing), the album's tracks made their CD debut as part of the chronologically sequenced Bear Family box set Everybody Loves Somebody (BCD 16343). A subsequent two-on-one CD (together with Martin's succeeding album Dino Latino) by Collectors' Choice restored the original running order.

Professional ratings
Review scores
Source	Rating
Allmusic	4/5 stars

== Track listing ==
No.	Title	Writer(s)	Recording date	Length
1.	"C'est si bon" (with chorus)	Henri Betti, André Hornez, Jerry Seelen	February 26, 1962	2:53
2.	"April in Paris"	Vernon Duke, Yip Harburg	February 27, 1962	3:34
3.	"Mimi"	Richard Rodgers, Lorenz Hart	February 27, 1962	2:26
4.	"Darling, Je Vous Aime Beaucoup"	Anna Sosenko	February 27, 1962	3:20
5.	"La Vie en rose"	Louiguy, Édith Piaf, Mack David	February 28, 1962	2:26
6.	"The Poor People of Paris" (with chorus)	Marguerite Monnot, René Rouzaud, Jack Lawrence	February 26, 1962	3:00
7.	"The River Seine" (with chorus)	Guy Lafarge, Allan Roberts, Alan Holt	February 26, 1962	2:22
8.	"The Last Time I Saw Paris"	Jerome Kern, Oscar Hammerstein II	February 27, 1962	2:48
9.	"Mam'selle"	Mack Gordon, Edmund Goulding	February 28, 1962	3:27
10.	"C'est Magnifique"	Cole Porter	February 28, 1962	2:39
11.	"Gigi"	Frederick Loewe, Alan Jay Lerner	February 28, 1962	3:39
12.	"I Love Paris"	Cole Porter	February 26, 1962	3:02
