= That Night in Rio =

1941 film by Irving Cummings

- Directed by: Irving Cummings
- Screenplay by: George Seaton; Bess Meredyth; Hal Long; Samuel Hoffenstein (additional dialogue); Jessie Ernst (adaptation)
- Based on: The Red Cat; 1934 play by Rudolph Lothar; Hans Adler
- Produced by: Darryl F. Zanuck (executive producer); Fred Kohlmar (associate producer)
- Starring: Don Ameche; Alice Faye; Carmen Miranda
- Cinematography: Ray Rennahan; Leon Shamroy
- Edited by: Walter Thompson
- Music by: Mack Gordon; Harry Warren
- Production company: 20th Century Fox
- Distributed by: 20th Century Fox
- Release date: April 11, 1941
- Running time: 91 minutes
- Country: United States
- Language: English

That Night in Rio is a 1941 American Technicolor musical comedy film directed by Irving Cummings and starring Alice Faye, Don Ameche (in a dual role as an American entertainer and an aristocratic businessman he is asked to impersonate temporarily) and Carmen Miranda. It was produced and distributed by Hollywood Twentieth Century Fox. It is one of several film adaptations of the 1934 play The Red Cat by Rudolf Lothar and Hans Adler. Others are Folies Bergère de Paris (1935) and On the Riviera (1951).

The original songs for the film were written by the musical partnership of Harry Warren and Mack Gordon. These include: "Boa Noite", "They Met in Rio (A Midnight Serenade)", "Chica Chica Boom Chic" and "I, Yi, Yi, Yi, Yi (I Like You Very Much)".

== Plot ==
Larry Martin (Don Ameche) is an American entertainer in the Casino Samba in Rio de Janeiro. He has a skit in his show, making fun of the womanizing Baron Manuel Duarte (also Ameche). On one particular evening, the Baron and his wife, Baroness Cecilia Duarte (Alice Faye) come to see Larry's impersonation. To the surprise of the couple, the act is amazingly realistic. Backstage, the Baron meets Larry's girlfriend, Carmen (Carmen Miranda), and invites her to a party he is going to hold. Carmen declines.

Later in the evening, Larry meets Cecilia and is attracted to her singing and her beauty. He does an impersonation of the Baron for her. But the real Baron receives a telegram that his airline is in danger because a contract is not being renewed and he has already purchased 51% of the stock. Needing money to repay the bank he borrowed it from, he flies down to Buenos Aires.

Larry is hired to play the Baron to confuse his rival, Machado (J. Carrol Naish), but at the stock market, he buys the remainder of the airline stock. That evening, at the party, Larry is hired again to play the Baron. He does not want the Baroness to know, but Cecilia is informed without his knowing. He sweeps her off her feet and they stay close to each other for the remainder of the evening.

Meanwhile, Carmen is furious to discover that Larry is at the party and decides to go there as well, where she discovers that he is impersonating the Baron. To make matter worse, the real Baron returns to his house, confusing all involved. Machado corners Larry instead and talks to him in French, which Larry can't understand. After the party, the Baron discovers that Cecilia was flirting with Larry for the evening and tries to play the joke on her. She, however, inadvertently turns the tables on him.

To get back at his wife, the next morning, the Baron calls and tells Cecilia that his plane has just landed. Cecilia fears that she has been unfaithful to Manuel but Larry later tells her the truth. At the office, Machado gives the Baron a payment of $32 million for his airline, the topic of his conversation with Larry. The Baron heads home but Cecilia tries one more time to get back at him by pretending to make violent love (in the old-fashioned sense) to Larry. It turns out to be the Baron and all is soon resolved in the end.

== Production ==
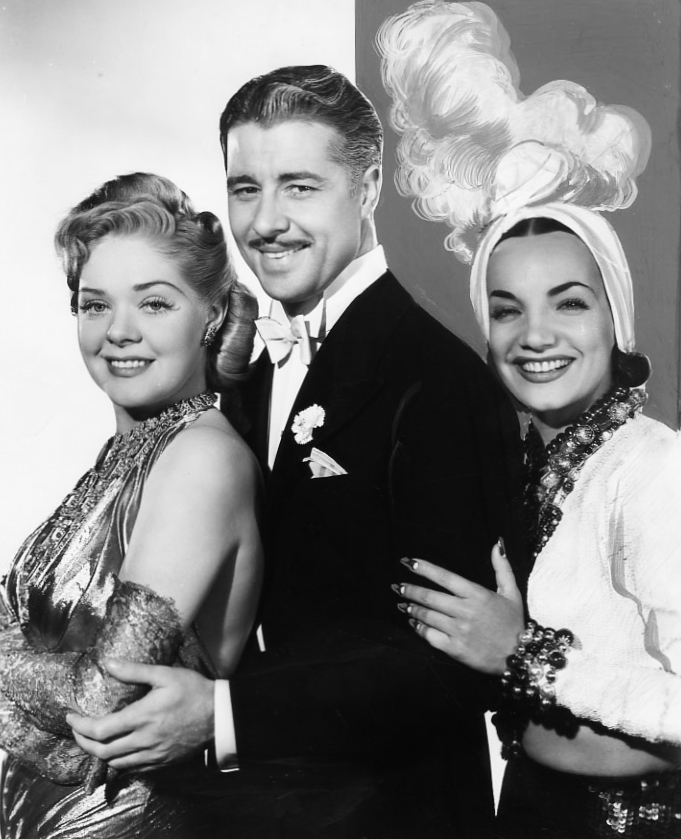
Alice Faye, Don Ameche, and Carmen Miranda in That Night in Rio.

The working titles for the film initially included A Latin from Manhattan, Rings on Her Fingers, They Met in Rio, and finally, The Road to Rio. Twentieth Century-Fox had to change the title to That Night in Rio due to a conflict with Paramount Pictures, which did not want the studio to promote the film for at least six months after the release of Road to Zanzibar, in order to avoid confusion with the similar titles.

The film's screenplay, written by George Seaton, Bess Meredyth, and Hal Long, is a remake of Folies Bergère de Paris (1935), directed by Roy Del Ruth and starring Maurice Chevalier, Merle Oberon, and Ann Sothern. It is based on the original play The Red Cat by Hans Adler, which premiered in New York on September 19, 1934. The head of production for the studio Fox, Darryl F. Zanuck, financed the Broadway production and acquired the rights to the musical, using the play as the basis for the film Folies Bergère de Paris. After That Night in Rio, Twentieth Century-Fox also used the play as a reference for On the Riviera (1951), starring Danny Kaye.

That Night in Rio marked the sixth and final collaboration between Alice Faye and Don Ameche. In the film, they even recorded a version of the song "Chica Chica Boom Chic" as a dance number, but only the sequence between Ameche and Carmen Miranda made it into the final cut. The screenplay was presented to the Brazilian ambassador in Washington, D.C., who approved it and stated that it would be "a useful type of film for relations between North and South America". A report published in the Motion Picture Production Code archives noted that the film was rejected for distribution in Ireland, although no specific reason was given.

== Cast ==
- Don Ameche as Larry Martin / Baron Manuel Duarte
- Alice Faye as Baroness Cecilia Duarte
- Carmen Miranda as Carmen, Larry's girlfriend
- S. Z. Sakall as Arthur Penna
- J. Carrol Naish as Machado, Manuel Duarte's business rival
- Curt Bois as Felicio Salles
- Leonid Kinskey as Monsieur Pierre Dufond
- Frank Puglia as Pedro, Manuel's valet
- Lillian Porter as Luiza, Cecilia's maid
- Maria Montez as Inez
- Georges Renavent as Ambassador
- Eddie Conrad as Alfonso
- Fortunio Bonanova as Pereira

== Soundtrack ==
- "Chica Chica Boom Chic" — Don Ameche and Carmen Miranda
- "The Baron Is in Conference" — Mary Ann Hyde, Vivian Mason, Barbara Lynn, Jean O'Donnell
- "The Conference" — Don Ameche
- "They Met in Rio (A Midnight Serenade)" - Don Ameche (in Portuguese) and Alice Faye (in English)
- "Cai Cai" — Carmen Miranda
- "I, Yi, Yi, Yi, Yi (I Like You Very Much)" — Carmen Miranda
- "Boa Noite (Good-Night)" — Don Ameche, Alice Faye and Carmen Miranda

== Reception ==
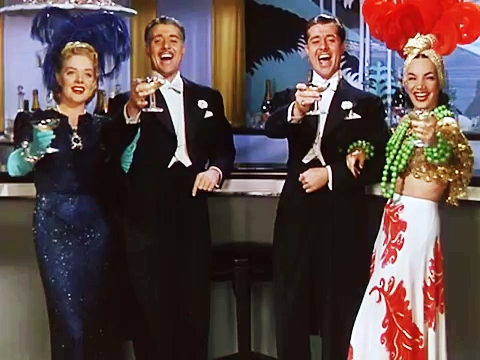
The main cast of That Night in Rio: Alice Faye, Don Ameche (in a dual role), and Carmen Miranda.

The film was released in theaters on April 11, 1941, to enthusiastic audiences and mildly appreciative critics, with Miranda stealing the notices. The New York Times review of That Night in Rio points out that Twentieth Century-Fox attempts to appeal to the Latin audience in a superficial and stereotypical manner, using elements like cheerful music, vibrant colors, and beautiful women, with a particular emphasis on the "beautiful girls." Despite the presence of Carmen Miranda and Latin music, the film follows the typical musical comedy formula of the time, prioritizing spectacle over originality. The review notes that the use of Don Ameche in dual roles is not a significant innovation and that the story becomes predictable, relying on recurring jokes. However, the review highlights Miranda's presence, with her performance and musical numbers (like "Chica Chica Boom Chic") bringing energy and sparkle to the film. While the movie has some charming moments and enjoyable musical numbers, it fails to establish a genuine connection with the Latin audience, serving more as a parade of images and stereotypes than a true cultural exploration.

Variety’s review of That Night in Rio describes the film as a direct successor to Down Argentine Way and a version of Folies Bergère de Paris (released six years earlier by 20th Century Fox), with the main difference being the setting, now in Rio de Janeiro. The production is characterized by visual luxury, with the use of Technicolor and a series of melodic songs, creating a vibrant and engaging entertainment experience. The review highlights Don Ameche's ability to perform his dual role competently, and praises Alice Faye for her appeal in the film. However, it is Carmen Miranda who steals the show, with her energy and presence, especially early on in the film, when she truly "begins to act," bringing undeniable vigor to the production.

Dave Kehr's review in the Chicago Reader describes the film as a routine Fox musical from 1941, mainly highlighting the use of "Shrieking Technicolor" (a reference to the excessive and vibrant use of Technicolor) and the presence of Carmen Miranda as the film's main attractions. The review points out that the film lacks memorable musical numbers, which were usually the hallmark of Fox musicals, and that the "silly" plot doesn't offer much relief, making the storyline monotonous.

The Los Angeles Herald-Examiner describes Carmen as "equipped with vibrant colors, articulated hips, and exuberantly cheerful," considering her one of the film's main attractions and highlighting her performance as the most fun of her Hollywood career. The Washington Star also praises her, saying she "lights up the new musical" with her "torrid" presence. The Hollywood Reporter goes even further, stating that Miranda's performance is "vivid, fiery, and tempestuous." Additionally, the Sydney Daily Mirror comments on Miranda's magnetism, stating that "the lips of the seemingly exotic Carmen Miranda are as fascinating as her hands".

The film is recognized by American Film Institute in these lists:

- 2006: AFI's Greatest Movie Musicals – Nominated
