= Pat Friday =

American singer

- Born: Helen Patricia Freiday; August 4, 1921; Jefferson County, Idaho
- Died: June 21, 2016 (age 94); Fredericksburg, Texas
- Occupation: Singer
- Spouse: David Berwick Vinson Jr.
- Children: 1 son 1 daughter

Pat Friday (born Helen Patricia Freiday; August 4, 1921 – June 21, 2016) was an American singer who worked with Glenn Miller on his films in the early 1940s.

== Early years ==
Friday was born in Jefferson County, Idaho, the daughter of France Everett Freiday and Helen Katherine Abbott.

She was discovered by Bing Crosby when he heard her sing during an amateur night at the Victor Hugo cafe in Hollywood. She was performing there at the urging of her sorority sisters at the University of California, Los Angeles, where she was studying home economics. Crosby was so impressed that he arranged to have her on his Kraft Music Hall show on May 25, 1939, where she sang “Begin the Beguine” and “Sing a Song of Sunbeams”. She continued on the show through the summer of 1939 with Variety commenting "As for the vocal department the program is well set for Bing Crosby's 13-week absence. The interim should do much to build Pat Friday, a schoolgirl, into major favor with the fans. Her voice is clear, lyrical and likeable, while the Music Maids, rhythm trio, contribute the right amount of salt and pepper to the show's vocal casserole". After that summer season, Friday returned to college.

== Film ==
Friday was a "ghost singer" who dubbed songs for Lynn Bari and was never credited. She sang "I Know Why (And So Do You)", the original vocal version of "At Last", and "Serenade in Blue" in the Glenn Miller movies Sun Valley Serenade and Orchestra Wives. She also was heard as a singer on the radio in The Story of G.I. Joe (1945).

== Radio ==
While still a student at UCLA, Friday was a singer on The Old Gold Don Ameche Show on the NBC Red radio network in 1940. A contemporary magazine article noted, "In order to attend rehearsals she has to cut Friday afternoon classes ... but she makes up by spending all the time she can in a corner of the studio, carefully doing her homework."

Later, after a short retirement following her marriage, Friday was a singer on The Roy Rogers Show, in the 1944–45 season although she did not care for that style of music.

She also sang on the Armed Forces Radio Service programs G.I. Journal and Personal Album.

== Recording ==
Friday was a recording artist with Decca Records and Enterprise Records.

== Personal life ==
On December 28, 1940, Friday married David Berwick Vinson Jr. in Beverly Wilshire Methodist Church in Los Angeles, California. They had a son and a daughter.

== Death ==
Friday died June 21, 2016, at her home in Fredericksburg, Texas.
