= Serenade in Blue =

1942 big band song by Harry Warren

1942 sheet music cover, Bregman, Vocco and Conn, Inc., New York.

1942 RCA Victor 78, 27935-A.

"Serenade in Blue" is a 1942 big band song composed by Harry Warren, with lyrics written by Mack Gordon. It was introduced in the 1942 film Orchestra Wives by Glenn Miller and His Orchestra, sung by Lynn Bari in the film but dubbed by Pat Friday.

== Background ==
Glenn Miller and His Orchestra were the first to record and release the song in 1942. They released the song as an RCA Victor 78, 27935-A, which peaked at #2 on the Billboard pop singles chart.

The RCA Victor recording by Glenn Miller and His Orchestra featured vocalist Ray Eberle with backing vocals by The Modernaires. This record was the year's eleventh-best selling recording in the United States according to Billboard magazine, after having spent fifteen weeks on the Billboard charts.

== Notable recordings ==
- The first recording and release of the song by Glenn Miller and His Orchestra (with vocal refrain by Ray Eberle and The Modernaires). It was recorded in Chicago on May 20, 1942 and was released by Glenn Miller and His Orchestra on RCA Victor Records as a 78 single, catalogue number 27935A, reaching #2 on the Billboard charts.
- Paul Whiteman and His Orchestra with Guest Vocalist Martha Tilton, 1942
- Tex Beneke with the Glenn Miller Orchestra
- Harry James, 1952
- Ray Anthony, 1954
- Al Caiola
- Vic Damone (1954)
- Doris Day - Doris Day's Sentimental Journey (1964)
- Billy Eckstine Big Band (April 21, 1947)
- David Rose and his Orchestra, 1948
- Dinah Shore
- Stan Getz - West Coast Jazz (1955)
- Jackie Gleason - Body and Soul (1995)
- Benny Goodman - Benny Goodman and His Great Vocalists, Dick Haymes on vocals, Legacy/Columbia, 1995
- Dexter Gordon - Landslide (1962)
- Charlie Mingus, 1956
- Lou Levy Trio in 1955
- Gloria Lynne
- Oscar Peterson Trio - Plays Harry Warren (1954), Pastel Moods (1956)
- Charlie Barnet, 1956
- Jerry Gray, 1958
- André Previn and David Rose - Like Blue (1960)
- Frank Sinatra - Sinatra and Swingin' Brass (1962)

== Popular culture ==
- Brad Kane (dubbing Danny Strong) and Royal Crown Revue in the Buffy the Vampire Slayer episode Superstar (2000).
