= I, Yi, Yi, Yi, Yi (I Like You Very Much) =

1941 song

"I, Yi, Yi, Yi, Yi (I Like You Very Much)" is a 1941 song written for the 1941 film That Night in Rio. It was popularized by Carmen Miranda who stars in the film in the role of Carmen. The lyrics were written by Mack Gordon and the music by Harry Warren.

== Covers and performances ==
- The song was recorded by The Andrews Sisters on January 7, 1941.
- Jane Withers mimicks Miranda's performance in the 1941 film Small Town Deb.
- The 1943 Our Gang comedy Calling All Kids included a performance of this song by Janet Burston, who was impersonating Carmen Miranda.
- In 1944, Carmen Miranda reprised the song for the film Four Jills in a Jeep. The film features several stars in a story about USO performers during WWII.
- Petula Clark recorded it for her 1957 album You Are My Lucky Star.
- Adrienne Barbeau sang this song as her character Carol Traynor on the sitcom Maude.
- Carol Channing sang this song when she appeared on The Muppet Show.
- The singer Rita Lee recorded a cover version in the 1980s.
- Alvin and the Chipmunks covered this song along with "Cuánto Le Gusta" for their 1987 film The Chipmunk Adventure and its soundtrack.
