= Battleship (soundtrack) =

Battleship (Original Motion Picture Soundtrack)

Film score by Steve Jablonsky
- Released: May 8, 2012
- Recorded: 2012
- Studios: Newman Scoring Stage, 20th Century Fox, Los Angeles; Remote Control Productions, Santa Monica
- Genre: Film score
- Length: 77:28
- Label: Varèse Sarabande
- Producer: Steve Jablonsky

Steve Jablonsky chronology
Transformers: Dark of the Moon (2011)	Battleship (Original Motion Picture Soundtrack) (2012)	Gangster Squad (2013)

Battleship (Original Motion Picture Soundtrack) is the film score soundtrack to the 2012 film Battleship directed by Peter Berg, starring Taylor Kitsch, Alexander Skarsgård, Rihanna in her feature film debut, Brooklyn Decker, Tadanobu Asano and Liam Neeson. The film score is composed and arranged by Steve Jablonsky, conducted by Nick Glennie-Smith and performed by the Hollywood Studio Symphony with contributions from rock guitarist Tom Morello from Rage Against the Machine. The soundtrack was released under the Varèse Sarabande label on May 8, 2012, ten days before the film's release.

== Development ==
In May 2011, it was reported that Steve Jablonsky would compose the musical score for Battleship. Berg found working with the composers as a "really frustrating experience" due to their pretentious nature. However, he found Hans Zimmer as a cooperative and wanted to work with him for Battleship; Zimmer instead named Steve Jablonsky to take the job. Jablonsky was riding on the success of his compositions for the Transformers franchise, worked under Zimmer's Remote Control Productions company. Universal Pictures' executive vice president of music, Mike Knobloch, who wanted someone to bring "something unique and fresh [and] all the challenges that go along with a big, loud, alien-invasion, war-at-sea movie" found Jablonsky to be the perfect fit due to his experience with big-budget action films.

Berg met Jablonsky a couple of times and came up with an idea where he brought an MRI for my neck that made a "really scary" sound. Impressed with it, Jablonsky recorded the MRI sounds and modified and adapted them to provide the theme for the aliens. Jablonsky produced an hybrid of traditional orchestral music and cutting-edge electronic sounds, which was different from the Transformers franchise. Most of the orchestra is produced with distorted pedals and man-made sounds that were sampled and amplified. Jablonsky stated:

"You need the music to help people like these characters, to support the emotional storyline. But mostly you need kick-ass, fast music that drives the scenes along and helps the action. That’s why people go to these films."

Berg enlisted pop producer Rick Rubin as the music advisor and Rage Against the Machine lead guitarist Tom Morello to contribute solos at key sequences. Morello's involvement, according to Berg, was to "move away from something that felt electronic to something that felt bad-ass and rock".

In 2012, it was announced that Eun-Mee Ahn would join the music department as the violin for the Hollywood Studio Symphony, marking her third collaboration with director Berg after The Rundown composed by Harry Gregson-Williams and Hancock composed by John Powell. Ahn was simultaneously working on Snow White and the Huntsman and with the completion of the film's session violinist from January to April 2012.

== Reception ==
Filmtracks.com criticized the score summarizing "Battleship is an intellectual wasteland of rehashed action for mechanized situations from previous movies." Megan Lehmann of The Hollywood Reporter described it as a "blaring score". Ben of Soundtrack Universe wrote: "There is nothing remotely redeemable about this album especially considering that what is present here has been done so much better in other works." Daniel Schweiger of Assignment X wrote: "Steve Jablonsky rocks the robot-things again".

Guy Lodge of Variety wrote: "Steve Jablonsky‘s score thumps and drones away with nary a pause, little betraying the presence of rock super-producer Rick Rubin and Rage Against the Machine guitarist Tom Morello on the music team." A critic from Daily Bruin described it as "super loud". Adam Litovitz of The Globe and Mail wrote: "music composer Steve Jablonsky try to manipulate the audience by alternating from victories to defeats with music that slows down to incorporate mournful bugles."

== Accolades ==
At the BMI Film & TV Awards 2013, Jablonsky won the BMI Film Music Award.

== Track listing ==
All tracks are written by Steve Jablonsky (except where noted).

Battleship: Original Motion Picture Soundtrack track listing
No.	Title	Length
1.	"First Transmission"	3:19
2.	"The Art of War"	4:33
3.	"Full Attack"	3:55
4.	"You're Going to the Navy"	1:04
5.	"The Beacon Project"	5:09
6.	"Objects Make Impact"	4:40
7.	"First Contact, Part I"	1:53
8.	"First Contact, Part II"	2:10
9.	"It's Your Ship Now"	4:05
10.	"Shredders"	4:07
11.	"Regents Are on the Mainland"	2:44
12.	"Trying to Communicate"	3:17
13.	"Water Displacement"	2:20
14.	"Buoy Grid Battle"	3:05
15.	"USS John Paul Jones"	2:25
16.	"We Have a Battleship"	2:51
17.	"Somebody's Gonna Kiss the Donkey"	4:35
18.	"Super Battle" (composed by Tom Morello)	1:34
19.	"Thug Fight" (featuring Tom Morello)	3:31
20.	"Battle on Land and Sea"	2:50
21.	"Silver Star"	1:56
22.	"The Aliens"	4:20
23.	"Planet G"	4:01
24.	"Hopper"	3:15
Total length:		77:28

== Additional music ==
- Stone Temple Pilots – "Interstate Love Song"
- Billy Squier – "Everybody Wants You"
- Henry Mancini – "The Pink Panther Theme"
- Lucky Clark – "My Lai"
- The Black Keys – "Gold on the Ceiling"
- Citizen Cope – "One Lovely Day"
- Dropkick Murphys – "Hang 'Em High"
- Carl Perkins – "Blue Suede Shoes"
- AC/DC – "Hard as a Rock"
- ZZ Top – "I Gotsta Get Paid"
- Royal Philharmonic Orchestra – "Waltz: On the Beautiful Blue Danube"
- AC/DC – "Thunderstruck"
- Band of Horses – "The Funeral"
- Creedence Clearwater Revival – "Fortunate Son"

== Personnel ==
- Music – Steve Jablonsky, Tom Morello
- Producer – Steve Jablonsky
- Additional music – Jacob Shea
- Programming – Nathan Whitehead
- Sound designer – Clay Duncan
- Technical score engineer – Erick DeVore
- Recording and mixing – Alan Meyerson
- Digital recordist – Kevin Globerman
- Mixing assistance – Lori Castro
- Mastering – Patricia Sullivan
- Supervising music editor – Bryan Lawson
- Score editor – Satoshi Noguchi
- Music supervisor – Rachel Levy
- Executive producer – Scott Stuber, Rick Rubin

Orchestra

- Performer – The Hollywood Studio Symphony
- Supervising orchestrator – Bruce Fowler
- Orchestrators – Jennifer Hammond, Kevin Kaska, Rick Giovinazzo, Walter Fowler
- Conductor – Nick Glennie-Smith
- Contractor – Peter Rotter
- Concertmaster – Endre Granat
- Stage recordist – Tim Lauber
- Stage mixing engineer – Greg Dennen
- Stage manager – Tom Steel, Denis St. Amand
- Music preparation – Booker White

Instruments

- Bagpipes – Aaron Shaw, Eric Boyd, Eric Rigler, John Allan, Kevin Weed, Richard Cook
- Bass – Ann Atkinson, Bruce Morgenthaler, Christian Kollgaard, David Parmeter, Drew D Dembowski, Edward Meares, Neil Garber, Oscar Hidalgo, Nico Carmine Abondolo
- Cello – Antony Cooke, Armen Ksajikian, Cecelia Tsan, Christina Soule, Christine Ermacoff, Dennis Karmazyn, Erika Duke-Kirkpatrick, Giovanna Clayton, Paula Hochhalter, Steve Richards, Steven Velez, Suzie Katayama, Timothy Landauer, Timothy Loo, Steve Erdody
- Electric violin – Charlie Bisharat
- Guitar – George Doering, Tom Morello
- Horn – Brian O'Connor, Daniel Kelley, David Everson, Jenny Kim, Mark Adams, Phillip Edward Yao, Steven Becknell, Yvonne Suzette Moriarty, James Thatcher
- Percussion – Alan Estes, Alex Acuña, Bernie Dresel, Brad Dutz, Brian Kilgore, Daniel Greco, Donald Williams, Eric Gardner, Steven Schaeffer, The LA Taiko Ensemble, Wade Culbreath
- Trombone – Alexander Iles, William Reichenbach, Phillip Teele, Steven Holtman, Charles Loper
- Trumpet – David Wailes, David Washburn, Rick Baptist, Walter Fowler, Jon Lewis
- Tuba – James Self, Doug Tornquist
- Viola – Alma Fernandez, Andrew Duckles, Darrin McCann, David Walther, Jennie Hansen, Maria Newman, Matthew Funes, Robert Brophy, Scott Hosfeld, Shawn Mann, Victoria Miskolczy, Brian Dembow
- Violin – Alyssa Park, Charlie Bisharat, Darius Campo, Dimitrie Leivici, Elizabeth Hedman, Eun-Mee Ahn, Helen Nightengale, Jacqueline Brand, Jay Rosen, Josefina Vergara, Julie Rogers, Katia Popov, Kevin Connolly, Lisa Sutton, Maia Jasper, Marc Sazer, Maya Magub, Natalie Leggett, Neil Samples, Phillip Levy, Rhea Fowler, Roberto Cani, Roger Wilkie, Sara Parkins, Sarah Thornblade, Serena McKinney, Shalini Vijayan, Sid Page, Tamara Hatwan, Tereza Stanislav, Tiffany Hu, Julie Ann Gigante
