= Harry Warren =

American composer and lyricist (1893–1981)

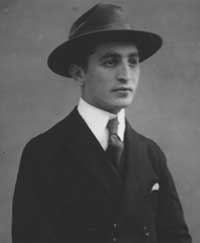
- c. 1920

Background information
- Born: Salvatore Antonio Guaragna; December 24, 1893; New York City, U.S.
- Died: September 22, 1981 (aged 87) Los Angeles, California, U.S.
- Genre: Popular music
- Occupation: Composer
- Instrument: Piano
- Spouse: Josephine Wensler (m. 1917)

Harry Warren (born Salvatore Antonio Guaragna; December 24, 1893 – September 22, 1981) was an American composer and the first major American songwriter to write primarily for film. He was nominated for the Academy Award for Best Original Song eleven times and won three Oscars for composing "Lullaby of Broadway", "You'll Never Know" and "On the Atchison, Topeka and the Santa Fe". He wrote the music for the first blockbuster film musical, 42nd Street, choreographed by Busby Berkeley, with whom he collaborated on many musical films.

Over a career spanning six decades, Warren wrote more than 800 songs. Other well known Warren hits included "I Only Have Eyes for You", "You Must Have Been a Beautiful Baby", "Jeepers Creepers", "The Gold Diggers' Song (We're in the Money)", "That's Amore", "There Will Never Be Another You", "The More I See You", "At Last" and "Chattanooga Choo Choo" (the last of which was the first gold record in history). Warren was one of America's most prolific film composers, and his songs have been featured in over 300 films.

== Biography ==
=== Early life ===
Warren was born Salvatore Antonio Guaragna, one of eleven children of Italian immigrants Antonio (a bootmaker) and Rachel De Luca Guaragna, and grew up in Brooklyn, New York. His father changed the family name to Warren when Harry was a child. Although his parents could not afford music lessons, Warren had an early interest in music and taught himself to play his father's accordion. He also sang in the church choir and learned to play the drums. He began to play the drums professionally by age 14 and dropped out of high school at 16 to play with his godfather's band in a traveling carnival. Soon he taught himself to play the piano and by 1915, he was working at the Vitagraph Motion Picture Studios, where he did a variety of administrative jobs, such as props man, and also played mood music on the piano for the actors, acted in bit parts and eventually was an assistant director. He also played the piano in cafés and silent-movie houses. In 1918 he joined the U.S. Navy, where he began writing songs.

=== Career ===
Warren wrote over 800 songs between 1918 and 1981, publishing over 500 of them. They were written mainly for 56 feature films or were used in other films that used Warren's newly written or existing songs. His songs eventually appeared in over 300 films and 112 of Warner Bros. Looney Tunes and Merrie Melodies cartoons. 42 of his songs were on the top ten list of the radio program "Your Hit Parade", a measure of a song's popularity. 21 of these reached number 1 on Your Hit Parade. "You'll Never Know" appeared 24 times. His song "I Only Have Eyes for You" is listed in the list of the 25 most-performed songs of the 20th Century, as compiled by the American Society of Composers, Authors, and Publishers (ASCAP). Warren was the director of ASCAP from 1929 to 1932.

He collaborated on some of his most famous songs with lyricists Al Dubin, Billy Rose, Mack Gordon, Leo Robin, Ira Gershwin and Johnny Mercer. In 1942 the Gordon-Warren song "Chattanooga Choo-Choo", as performed by the Glenn Miller Orchestra, became the first gold record in history. It was No.1 for nine weeks on the Billboard pop singles chart in 1941–1942, selling 1.2 million copies. Among his biggest hits were "There Will Never Be Another You", "I Only Have Eyes for You", "Forty-Second Street", "The Gold Diggers' Song (We're in the Money)", "Lullaby of Broadway", "Serenade In Blue", "At Last", "Jeepers Creepers", "You're Getting to Be a Habit with Me", "That's Amore", and "Young and Healthy".

==== Early hits and film years ====
Warren's first hit song was "Rose of the Rio Grande" (1922), with lyrics by Edgar Leslie. He wrote a succession of hit songs in the 1920s, including "I Love My Baby (My Baby Loves Me)" and "Seminola" in 1925, "Where Do You Work-a John?" and "In My Gondola" in 1926 and "Nagasaki" in 1928. In 1930, he composed the music for the song "Cheerful Little Earful" for the Billy Rose Broadway revue, Sweet and Low, and composed the music, with lyrics by Mort Dixon and Joe Young, for the Ed Wynn Broadway revue The Laugh Parade in 1931.

He started working for Warner Brothers in 1932, paired with Dubin to write the score for the first blockbuster film musical, 42nd Street, and continued to work there for six years, writing the scores for 32 more musicals. He worked for 20th Century Fox starting in 1940, writing with Mack Gordon. He moved to MGM starting in 1944, writing for musical films such as The Harvey Girls and The Barkleys of Broadway, many starring Fred Astaire. He later worked for Paramount, starting in the early 1950s, writing for the Bing Crosby and Jane Wyman movie Just for You and the Martin and Lewis movie The Caddy, the latter containing the hit song "That's Amore". He continued to write songs for several more Jerry Lewis comedies.

Warren is particularly remembered for writing scores for the films of Busby Berkeley; they worked together on 18 films. His "uptempo songs are as memorable as Berkeley's choreography, as [sic] for the same reason: they capture, in a few snazzy notes, the vigorous frivolity of the Jazz Age."

Warren won the Academy Award for Best Song three times, collaborating with three different lyricists: "Lullaby of Broadway" with Al Dubin in 1935, "You'll Never Know" with Mack Gordon in 1943, and "On the Atchison, Topeka and the Santa Fe" with Johnny Mercer in 1946. He was nominated for eleven Oscars.

==== Last years ====
In 1955, Warren wrote "The Legend of Wyatt Earp", which was used in the ABC/Desilu Studios television series, The Life and Legend of Wyatt Earp. He also wrote the opening theme, "Hey, Marty" (lyrics by Paddy Chayefsky), for the film Marty, which won the Academy Award for Best Picture in 1955. The last musical score that Warren composed specifically for Broadway was Shangri-La, a disastrous 1956 adaptation of James Hilton's Lost Horizon, which ran for only 21 performances. In 1957, he received his last Academy Award nomination for the song "An Affair to Remember". He continued to write songs for movies throughout the 1960s and 1970s but never again achieved the fame that he had enjoyed earlier. His last movie score was for Manhattan Melody, in 1980, but the film was never produced.

Warren composed a Mass, with Latin text, in 1962. This was performed a decade later at Loyola Marymount University, but it has yet to be recorded commercially. He also wrote nearly three dozen short piano vignettes. The sheet music was first published by Warren's Four Jays Music Co. A dozen of these were released on a 1975 album titled Harry Warren's Piano Vignettes, played by Hugh Delain. Several pianists have recorded the vignettes, including Warren himself.

=== Personal life ===
Warren married Josephine Wensler in 1917. They had a son, Harry Jr. (1919–1938), and a daughter, Joan (b. 1925). His wife died in 1993.

Warren died on September 22, 1981, in Los Angeles. He is interred in the Westwood Village Memorial Park Cemetery in Los Angeles. The plaque bearing Warren's epitaph displays the first few notes of "You'll Never Know".

== Reputation and legacy ==
According to Wilfrid Sheed, quoted in Time magazine: "By silent consensus, the king of this army of unknown soldiers, the Hollywood incognitos, was Harry Warren, who had more songs on the Hit Parade than Berlin himself and who would win the contest hands down if enough people have heard of him." William Zinsser noted: "The familiarity of Harry Warren's songs is matched by the anonymity of the man ... he is the invisible man, his career a prime example of the oblivion that cloaked so many writers who cranked out good songs for bad movies." At least three episodes of the Lawrence Welk Show were devoted entirely to Warren's music: Season 18, Episode 5, October 7, 1972; Season 25, Episode 10, November 24, 1979; and Season 27, Episode 17, January 2, 1982 Susannah McCorkle's debut album was The Music of Harry Warren (1976).

In 1980, producer David Merrick and director Gower Champion adapted the 1933 film 42nd Street into a Broadway musical that won the Tony Award for Best Musical in 1981, ran for 3,486 performances and has had several major revivals. The score incorporated songs by Warren and Dubin from various movie musicals, including 42nd Street, Dames, Go Into Your Dance, Gold Diggers of 1933, and Gold Diggers of 1935.

A theatre in Gravesend, Brooklyn, New York, the Harry Warren Theatre, was named for Warren in 1982.

== Songs ==
Music by Warren, unless noted:

=== Academy Award nominations and winners ===
Winners

- "Lullaby of Broadway" (1935) w. Al Dubin for Gold Diggers of 1935
- "You'll Never Know" (1943) w. Mack Gordon for Hello, Frisco, Hello
- "On the Atchison, Topeka and the Santa Fe" (1945) w. Johnny Mercer for The Harvey Girls

Nominations

- "Remember Me?" (1937) w. Al Dubin for Mr. Dodd Takes the Air
- "Jeepers Creepers" (1938) w. Johnny Mercer for Going Places
- "Down Argentina Way" (1940) w. Mack Gordon for Down Argentine Way
- "Chattanooga Choo Choo" (1941) w. Mack Gordon for Sun Valley Serenade
- "I've Got a Gal in Kalamazoo" (1942) w. Mack Gordon for Orchestra Wives
- "Zing a Little Zong" (1952) w. Leo Robin for Just for You
- "That's Amore" (1953) w. Jack Brooks for The Caddy
- "An Affair to Remember (Our Love Affair)" (1956) w. Harold Adamson and Leo McCarey for An Affair to Remember

=== No. 1 hits ===
- "By the River Sainte Marie" (1931) w. Edgar Leslie
- "Too Many Tears" (1932) w. Al Dubin
- "I Found a Million Dollar Baby (in a Five and Ten Cent Store)" (1932) w. Mort Dixon
- "You're Getting to Be a Habit With Me" (1933) w. Al Dubin
- "Forty-Second Street" (1933) w. Al Dubin
- "Shadow Waltz" (1933) w. Al Dubin

78 recording of "Chattanooga Choo Choo" by the Glenn Miller Orchestra with vocal solo by Tex Beneke

- "(You May Not Be an Angel, But) I'll String Along With You" (1934) w. Al Dubin
- "Lullaby of Broadway" (1935) w. Al Dubin
- "She's a Latin from Manhattan" (1935) w. Al Dubin
- "I'll Sing You a Thousand Love Songs" (1936) w. Al Dubin
- "September in the Rain" (1937) w. Al Dubin
- "With Plenty of Money and You" (1937) w. Al Dubin
- "Remember Me?" (1937) w. Al Dubin
- "Jeepers Creepers" (1938) w. Johnny Mercer
- "You Must Have Been a Beautiful Baby" (1938) w. Johnny Mercer
- "Chattanooga Choo Choo" (1941) w. Mack Gordon
- "My Heart Tells Me (Should I Believe My Heart?)" (1943) w. Mack Gordon
- "I Had the Craziest Dream" (1943) w. Mack Gordon
- "You'll Never Know" (1943) w. Mack Gordon
- "The More I See You" (1945) w. Mack Gordon
- "On the Atchison, Topeka and the Santa Fe" (1945) w. Johnny Mercer

=== Other selected songs from films ===
- "You're Getting to Be a Habit with Me" (1932) w. Al Dubin for 42nd Street
- "Forty-Second Street" (1933) w. Al Dubin for 42nd Street
- "Shuffle Off to Buffalo" (1933) w. Al Dubin for 42nd Street
- "The Boulevard of Broken Dreams" (1933) w. Al Dubin for Moulin Rouge

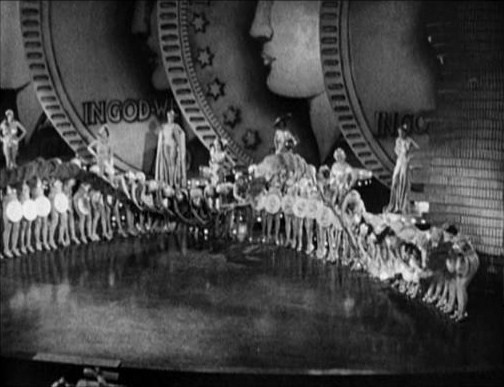
"Dance of the Dollars" production number launched the song "We're in the Money" in Gold Diggers of 1933

- "Keep Young and Beautiful" (1933) w. Al Dubin for Roman Scandals
- "Pettin' in the Park" (1933) w. Al Dubin for Gold Diggers of 1933
- "We're in the Money" (1933) w. Al Dubin for Gold Diggers of 1933
- "I Only Have Eyes for You" (1934) w. Al Dubin for Dames
- "I'll String Along with You" (1934) w. Al Dubin for Twenty Million Sweethearts
- "About a Quarter to Nine" (1935) w. Al Dubin for "Go into Your Dance"
- "Lullaby of Broadway" (1935) w. Al Dubin for Gold Diggers of 1935
- "September in the Rain" (1935) w. Al Dubin for Stars Over Broadway
- "You Must Have Been a Beautiful Baby" (1938) w. Johnny Mercer for Hard to Get
- "Chica Chica Boom Chic" (1941) w. Mack Gordon for That Night in Rio
- "I, Yi, Yi, Yi, Yi (I Like You Very Much)" (1941) w. Mack Gordon for That Night in Rio
- "Chattanooga Choo Choo" (1941) w. Mack Gordon for Sun Valley Serenade
- "I Know Why (And So Do You)" (1941) w. Mack Gordon for Sun Valley Serenade
- "It Happened in Sun Valley" (1941) w. Mack Gordon for Sun Valley Serenade
- "At Last" (1941) w. Mack Gordon for Sun Valley Serenade
- "I Had the Craziest Dream" (1942) w. Mack Gordon for Springtime in the Rockies
- "Serenade In Blue" (1942) w. Mack Gordon for Orchestra Wives
- "There Will Never Be Another You" (1942) w. Mack Gordon for Iceland
- "You'll Never Know" (1943) w. Mack Gordon for Hello, Frisco, Hello
- "On the Atchison, Topeka and the Santa Fe" (1945) w. Johnny Mercer for The Harvey Girls
- "The More I See You" (1945) w. Mack Gordon for Diamond Horseshoe
- "This Heart of Mine" (1946) w. Arthur Freed for Ziegfeld Follies
- "Cryin' For the Carolines" (1930) w. Sam Lewis and Joe Young for Spring Is Here
- "Have A Little Faith In Me" (1930) w. Sam Lewis and Joe Young for Spring Is Here
- "(The Same Thing Happens with) The Birds and the Bees" (1956) Mack David for The Birds and the Bees

=== American songbook songs ===
In his book American Popular Song, Alec Wilder notes that Warren "wasn't in the category as the best theater writers, but he certainly was among the foremost pop song writers." He discusses songs he likes: "Would You Like to Take a Walk?" (1930, with Mort Dixon and Billy Rose for Sweet & Low), "I Found a Million Dollar Baby (in a Five and Ten Cent Store)" (1931, with Dixon and Rose for Crazy Quilt), "You're Getting to Be a Habit with Me" (1932), "Summer Night" (1936), "There Will Never Be Another You" (1942), "Serenade in Blue" (1942), "At Last" (1942), "Jeepers Creepers" (1938), and "The More I See You" (1945).

Other popular songs

- "Cheerful Little Earful" (1930) w. Ira Gershwin and Billy Rose for Sweet & Low
- "Nagasaki" (1928) w. Mort Dixon
