= Sun Valley Serenade =

1941 film by H. Bruce Humberstone

- Theatrical release poster
- Directed by: H. Bruce Humberstone
- Screenplay by: Robert Ellis; Helen Logan
- Story by: Art Arthur; Robert Harari
- Produced by: Milton Sperling
- Starring: Sonja Henie; John Payne; Milton Berle; Glenn Miller; Lynn Bari
- Cinematography: Edward Cronjager
- Edited by: James B. Clark
- Music by: David Buttolph; Cyril J. Mockridge; Emil Newman
- Production company: Twentieth Century Fox
- Distributed by: Twentieth Century Fox
- Release date: August 21, 1941
- Running time: 86 minutes
- Country: United States
- Language: English
- Box office: $2.25 million (rentals)

Sun Valley Serenade is a 1941 American musical film directed by H. Bruce Humberstone and starring Sonja Henie, John Payne, Glenn Miller, Milton Berle, and Lynn Bari. It features music by the Glenn Miller Orchestra and dancing by the Nicholas Brothers. It also features Dorothy Dandridge, performing "Chattanooga Choo Choo", which was nominated for an Oscar for Best Song, was inducted into the Grammy Hall of Fame in 1996, and was awarded the first gold record for sales of 1.2 million. Studio 20th Century Fox re-released the film in 1946 and in 1954 to tie-in with the biopic The Glenn Miller Story.

== Plot ==
Ted Scott (John Payne) is a band pianist whose publicity manager decides that, for good press, the band should adopt a foreign refugee. The band goes to Ellis Island to meet the girl and soon discovers that the refugee is not a 10-year-old child, but a young woman, Karen Benson (Sonja Henie). The surprise comes right before the band is to travel to Sun Valley, Idaho, for a Christmas event. While on the ski slopes, Ted soon falls for Karen's inventive schemes to win the heart of her new sponsor, much to the chagrin of his girlfriend, Vivian Dawn (Lynn Bari), a soloist with the band. Vivian promptly quits the band out of jealousy, and Karen stages an elaborate ice show as a substitute.

== Cast ==
- Sonja Henie as Karen Benson
- John Payne as Ted Scott
- Glenn Miller as Phil Corey
- Milton Berle as Jerome K. 'Nifty' Allen
- Lynn Bari as Vivian Dawn (singing voice by Pat Friday)
- Joan Davis as Miss Carstairs (charity collector at Sun Valley)
- William B. Davidson as Mr. Murray, owner of Sun Valley
- Almira Sessions as Karen's nurse
- The Modernaires as Themselves
- The Nicholas Brothers as Themselves
- Dorothy Dandridge as a Specialty Act with the Nicholas Brothers
- Glenn Miller Orchestra as the Phil Corey Orchestra / the Dartmouth Troubadours

Future Olympic gold medalist Gretchen Fraser was the skiing stand-in for Sonja Henie. Fraser was a member of the Olympic team in 1940 (cancelled) and 1948.

== Music ==
Of particular note is the elaborate "Chattanooga Choo Choo" sequence. The scene begins at a rehearsal with the Glenn Miller Orchestra practicing "Chattanooga Choo Choo" and includes two choruses of the song whistled and sung by Tex Beneke in a musical exchange with the Modernaires. As the Miller band concludes their feature, the camera pans left to reveal a railway station set. The band continues with the production number and accompanies Dorothy Dandridge and the Nicholas Brothers in their song-and-dance routine.

Sun Valley Serenade is the first of the only two movies featuring the Glenn Miller Orchestra (the other is 1942's Orchestra Wives). Besides "Chattanooga Choo Choo", other Glenn Miller tunes in the film are "Moonlight Serenade", "It Happened in Sun Valley", "I Know Why (And So Do You)", and "In the Mood".

An instrumental version of "At Last" was recorded by Glenn Miller and his Orchestra as well as a version with vocals by John Payne and Pat Friday, but these recordings remained unused and unissued except for the 1954 LP album. Darryl Zanuck reportedly said, "There are too many big ones in this. Let's save one for the next." "At Last" can be heard in the movie in three scenes, however, in an orchestral performance by Glenn Miller and His Orchestra film in the Lido Terrace night club after they perform "In the Mood", as part of the orchestral background score in a scene between John Payne and Lynn Bari, and in an orchestral version with vocalization but without lyrics 1:20 in length during the closing skating sequence with Sonja Henie. "At Last" would also appear in the 1942 follow-up movie Orchestra Wives performed by Glenn Miller and his Orchestra with vocals by Ray Eberle and Pat Friday.

Los Angeles vocalist Pat Friday recorded the vocal tracks that Lynn Bari lip synced in the film.

The film benefits from the fortuitous discovery in the Twentieth Century-Fox archives of recordings containing multichannel optical sound. These recordings were intended to achieve a better balance in the sound mixes of the musical numbers.

From these recordings, several musical segments can be heard in stereophonic sound in the restored DVD and Blu-ray versions of the film. Among them is the notable "Chattanooga Choo Choo", which features, in addition to Glenn Miller and his orchestra, the vocal group the Modernaires, singer Paula Kelly, and saxophonist and vocalist Tex Beneke. The musical theme includes a remarkable tap dance number performed by Dorothy Dandridge and the Nicholas brothers.

Although the multichannel sound recordings were not made with the goal of achieving stereophonic sound, the result is of a very acceptable quality and a unique musical testament. For other segments of the film for which the mix tapes were not preserved, the monaural sound was electronically rechanneled, making a noticeable difference compared to the shots that benefit from multichannel sound.

A highlight of the film is the skating scene on black ice, designed to showcase Sonja Henie, a multi-Olympic gold medalist in figure skating and also an extraordinary figure skater.

== Filming ==
Sun Valley Serenade was filmed in March 1941, by Darryl Zanuck. Zanuck had come up with the idea for the film while on holiday there. Popular myth to the contrary, nearly all of the filming was done on the 20th-Century Fox sound stages in Hollywood. Only a few actors travelled to Sun Valley for exterior location shots.

The film became a Hollywood hit and served as a recruiting effort for the elite ski corps of the 10th Mountain Division stationed at Camp Hale in Colorado. Sun Valley's ski school director, Otto Lang, of St. Anton, oversaw the skiing scenes. The musical numbers were recorded in multidirectional mono, placing microphones around different parts of the orchestra. Those were all mixed down to mono at the time the film was released. The parts of those recordings were found and mixed into true stereo. They have also been included in home video releases.

Clarice Freeman Schnoebelen, a skater who toured with Sonja Henie and appeared in the films, told her family a story about the filming of Sun Valley Serenade. Her name at the time was Clarice Evans or Corliss Evans. She said that the black dye added to the ice in the famous "black ice" scene, which created the mirror effect of the ice, stained the women's skates, and no offer was made to clean the skates or replace them. The women had to replace the skates out of their own pockets. In addition to the dye, the surface was flooded with water to increase the intensity of the reflection, which also increased the splashing of dye onto the skates. Some of the men, who wore black skates, did not have the same problem. Whether the other men who wore white skates were reimbursed is unclear.

== Screenings ==
The film is shown 24 hours a day on a dedicated television channel available to all rooms at the Sun Valley Lodge and Inn.

The film was released in the Soviet Union in June 1944, as escapist entertainment for Soviet civilians. For many years afterward, in the early Cold War era when American films and music were mostly banned in the country, this film was the template for the Soviet youth who tried to imitate the "American lifestyle".

The film was a favorite in Jewish displaced persons camps in the aftermath of the Holocaust, with the film's light entertainment and quick adaptation of Sonja Henie's character to American life a potential model for Jewish displaced persons' futures.

The first Christmas Eve presentation of Sun Valley Serenade on Turner Classic Movies (TCM) was introduced by host Robert Osborne, in 2013. TCM had shown this movie in previous years on days other than Christmas Eve.

The film was released in the VHS format in 1991 by 20th Century Fox. In 2007, Sun Valley Serenade was released on DVD by 20th Century Fox for Region 2 format (Japan, Europe, South Africa, and the Middle East). It remains unreleased on DVD for Region 1 (U.S., U.S. Territories, Canada, and Bermuda), though it is available on VOD outlets in the United States. The Blu-ray version of Sun Valley Serenade has been released in Spain under the title Tu Serás Mi Marido [literally You Will Be my Husband]. It is playable on Region A Blu-ray players in the U.S., Canada, and Latin America.

== Awards and honors ==
Academy Awards:

- Nominated: Best Cinematography, Black-and-White, Edward Cronjager (1942)
- Nominated: Best Music, Original Song for "Chattanooga Choo Choo" Harry Warren (music), Mack Gordon (lyrics) (1942)
- Nominated: Best Music, Scoring of a Musical Picture, Emil Newman (1942)

The film is recognized by American Film Institute in these lists:

- 2004: AFI's 100 Years...100 Songs:
  - "Chattanooga Choo Choo" – nominated
- 2006: AFI's Greatest Movie Musicals – Nominated

== Chattanooga Choo Choo ==
The film features the million-selling hit song "Chattanooga Choo Choo", which is a highlight and centerpiece of the movie. The RCA Victor 78 single reached number one on the Billboard singles chart in 1941 and became the top record of that year. RCA Victor awarded Glenn Miller a gold record award for sales of 1.2 million copies in 1942. Originally, RCA issued the song as the B side with "I Know Why" as the A side, but "Chattanooga Choo Choo" was the side that was played on the radio and became the hit.

== Reception ==
Filmink thought Henie "is particularly smug in this one, but everything else is fantastic. Brilliant support cast. Glenn Miller novelty. Divine Bari and Nicholas brothers."
