= Chica Chica Boom Chic =

Portuguese-language song by Harry Warren and Mack Gordon

"Chica, Chica, Boom, Chic"

Song by Carmen Miranda
- Released: 1941
- Composer(s): Harry Warren; Mack Gordon
- Lyricist(s): Aloysio de Oliveira

Chica, Chica, Boom, Chic is a song composed by Harry Warren and Mack Gordon (lyrics in Portuguese by Aloysio de Oliveira) and recorded by Carmen Miranda for her 1941 film That Night in Rio.

A recording by Xavier Cugat and His Waldorf-Astoria Orchestra (vocal by Lina Romay) briefly reached the Billboard charts in 1941 in the No. 26 position. Other recordings in 1941 were by Bob Crosby and His Orchestra (vocals by Bonnie King and The Bob-o-links), Dick Jurgens & His Orchestra (vocal by Buddy Moreno), Leo Reisman and His Orchestra (vocal by Anita Boyer), and by Carmen Miranda.
