= Billy May =

American composer, arranger and trumpeter (1916–2004)

Background information
- Born: Edward William May Jr. November 10, 1916; Pittsburgh, Pennsylvania, U.S.
- Died: January 22, 2004 (aged 87) San Juan Capistrano, California, U.S.
- Genre: Big band
- Occupations: Musician, composer, arranger
- Instrument: Trumpet

Edward William May Jr. (November 10, 1916 – January 22, 2004) was an American composer, arranger and trumpeter. He composed film and television music for The Green Hornet (1966), The Mod Squad (1968), Batman (with Batgirl theme, 1967), and Naked City (1960). He collaborated on films such as Pennies from Heaven (1981), and orchestrated Cocoon, and Cocoon: The Return, among others.

May wrote arrangements for many top singers, including Frank Sinatra, Yma Sumac, Nat King Cole, Anita O'Day, Peggy Lee, Vic Damone, Bobby Darin, Johnny Mercer, Ella Fitzgerald, Louis Prima, Keely Smith, Jack Jones, Bing Crosby, Sandler and Young, Nancy Wilson, Rosemary Clooney, the Andrews Sisters and Ella Mae Morse. He also collaborated with satirist Stan Freberg on several classic 1950s and 1960s comedy music albums.

As a trumpet player in the 1940s big band era, May recorded such songs as "Measure for Measure", "Long Tall Mama" and "Boom Shot" with Glenn Miller and His Orchestra, and "The Wrong Idea", "Lumby" and "Wings Over Manhattan" with Charlie Barnet and His Orchestra. With his own band, he had a hit single, "Charmaine". In the 1950s he released several successful albums of his unique orchestral arrangements and compositions, including Sorta-May and Sorta-Dixie.

== Early life and music ==
May was born in Pittsburgh, Pennsylvania. He started out playing the tuba in the high school band. "I sat in the rear of the [band]stand", he said. "I didn't realize it at the time, but I was intrigued with becoming an arranger and an orchestrator". At the age of 17, he began playing with Gene Olsen's Polish-American Orchestra.

== Swing era and big bands ==
May moved to New York City at age 22 to become chief arranger for the Charlie Barnet Orchestra. He held this position from February 1939 until October 1940, and joined its trumpet section in June 1939. May's contract with Barnet called for writing at extraordinary speed: four new arrangements per week, about 70 of which were recorded and commercially released by RCA Victor on the Bluebird label. May arranged some of Barnet's best-selling records, including "Pompton Turnpike" and "Leapin' at the Lincoln", but it was May's now-classic arrangement of Ray Noble's "Cherokee" that launched Barnet and his band to national stardom.

At Barnet's request, May closely studied the musical language of Barnet's idol, Duke Ellington. May soon developed a harmonic and sonic palette rich with Ellingtonian colors. The Ellington influence is apparent in some of May's arrangements of new pop songs including "Danger in the Dark" and "Strange Enchantment". They are on full display in May's arrangements of Ellington's own compositions, particularly "The Sergeant Was Shy", "Ring Dem Bells", and "Rockin' in Rhythm". Ellington even reciprocated the musical respect by recording his own arrangement of "In a Mizz", a Charlie Barnet original arranged by May in June 1939.

May's first recorded serious composition for jazz orchestra was Wings Over Manhattan, a three-part suite celebrating the "aviation" theme of the 1939-1940 New York World's Fair for which it was written. It is also a musical salute to Ellington, showing the influence of Ellington's longer-form works like Reminiscing in Tempo and Symphony in Black. Composer/historian Gunther Schuller felt that by age 23, Billy May's command of Ellington's compositional language had become so convincing that "the 'disciple' could hardly be distinguished from the 'master'."

May's sense of musical humor—which later became one of the hallmarks of his sound—began to take shape with the Charlie Barnet Orchestra, as evident in his arrangements of novelty numbers like "Six Lessons From Madame La Zonga". May's earliest recorded musical parody—a comedic skill he would later master with comedian Stan Freberg—was "The Wrong Idea", an original song by May and Barnet, with syrupy vocal and comically bad trumpet soloing by May (whom Barnet introduces as "Slappy Habits"). Barnet called "The Wrong Idea" a "flagrant burlesque" of the best-selling "sweet" bands of the day led by Kay Kyser and Sammy Kaye, whose motto "Swing and Sway with Sammy Kaye" becomes "Swing and Sweat with Charlie Barnet" when May sings it.

May and Barnet remained close throughout their lives, and May arranged another 36 titles for the Barnet Orchestra between 1954 and 1970.

The original manuscript scores, and some of the original band parts, for about 80 of May's arrangements for Barnet are now housed at the Music Division of the Library of Congress in Washington, D.C., where they are open to the public for research. Many others were destroyed in the 1939 fire at the Palomar Ballroom in Los Angeles.

Bandleader Glenn Miller hired May away from Barnet in 1940. "May points out that he was not responsible for any of the [Glenn Miller] band's signature hits, but he did write the beautiful left-field introduction to [Bill] Finegan's [arrangement of] 'Serenade In Blue'".

Miller and May had a wary relationship. According to Will Friedwald, by 1942 May was ready to resign from the Miller band. Miller refused to record half of May's arrangements, and May objected to Miller's regimented style. But since Miller was joining the military, he convinced May to stay on until the band broke up. May said around 1995 (after a life of heavy drinking and rehabilitation for alcoholism) that working with Miller "helped me immensely. I learned a lot from Glenn. He was a good musician and an excellent arranger."

== Later career ==
When the era of the Big Bands ended in the late 1940s, May relocated to Los Angeles, where he became a much-coveted arranger and studio orchestra leader, working for top recording stars of the day including Frank Sinatra, Rosemary Clooney, Anita O'Day and Bing Crosby.

=== With Capitol Records ===
At Capitol, May wrote arrangements for many top artists. These included Frank Sinatra on the albums Come Fly with Me (1958), Come Dance with Me! (1959) and Come Swing with Me! (1961); Nat King Cole on the albums Just One of Those Things and Let's Face the Music!, as well as numerous singles (all his work with Cole being packaged later on the 2-CD set The Billy May Sessions); Peggy Lee on the albums Pretty Eyes and Christmas Carousel; Sue Raney on her second album Songs for a Raney Day; Vic Damone on the albums The Lively Ones and Strange Enchantment; Jeri Southern on the album Jeri Southern Meets Cole Porter; Keely Smith on the album Politely and on a duet single, "Nothing In Common"/"How Are Ya Fixed For Love?", with Sinatra; Bobby Darin on the album Oh! Look at Me Now; Nancy Wilson on the albums Like In Love, Something Wonderful, Tender Loving Care, Nancy - Naturally! and various tracks from the albums Just For Now and Lush Life; Matt Monro on several tracks from the albums Invitation to the Movies, Invitation to Broadway, and These Years; Bing Crosby and Rosemary Clooney on the albums Fancy Meeting You Here and That Travelin' Two-Beat; and Sir George Shearing on the albums Satin Affair and Burnished Brass, co-arranged with Shearing (May also conducted Shearing's album Concerto for My Love, on which Shearing had sole credit for the arrangements).

May's orchestra was featured on many Capitol Records children's projects, including cowboy star, Hopalong Cassidy. He worked closely with early 1950s satirist Stan Freberg, using his arranging skills to help Freberg create his spoofs of current hits by creating musical backing often stunningly close to the original hit single.

On Freberg's Wun'erful, Wun'erful! a lacerating spoof of bandleader Lawrence Welk, May hired some of Hollywood's best jazz musicians, who relished the idea of mocking the financially successful but musically mediocre Welk sound, which they considered the epitome of "square". The result was a note-perfect recreation of Welk's sound as Freberg and a group of vocalists performed parodies of Welk's "musical family". Freberg recounted that Welk was less than amused by the recording.

May also composed and conducted the music for Freberg's short-lived comedy radio series on CBS, which ran for 15 episodes in 1957. His sendup of trashy horror-film music ("Gray Flannel Hat Full of Teenage Werewolves") is notable.

May won two Grammy Awards, including Best Performance by an Orchestra in 1958 and Best Arrangement in 1959. Much of his work for Capitol has been reissued on the Ultra-Lounge CD series.

In the late 1960s into the early 1970s, May conducted many recreations of big band era classics, recorded by Capitol. May transcribed note for note from the original recordings of big band legends such as Charlie Barnet, Glenn Miller, Benny Goodman and others and then conducted a group of all-star veteran musicians on the sessions, including some of the original performers such as singers Helen Forrest, Helen Ward and Tex Beneke. The Time-Life label released these as boxed sets titled as "The Swing Era," whose marketing was focused on the fact that these high-fidelity stereo recordings allowed listeners to enjoy the music with a depth and realism that the 78 rpm recordings of that era had never been able to fully capture.

=== Other record labels ===
The Crosby-Clooney collaboration was a sequel to their earlier, more successful album on RCA Victor, Fancy Meeting You Here, also arranged by May, whose other non-Capitol work included another Bing Crosby duet album, this time with Louis Armstrong, entitled Bing & Satchmo; a further duet album twinning Bobby Darin with Johnny Mercer (Two of a Kind); the sixth in Ella Fitzgerald's acclaimed series of Song Books for Verve Records, Ella Fitzgerald Sings the Harold Arlen Songbook; similar dips into Cole Porter and Rodgers and Hart with Anita O'Day (Anita O'Day Swings Cole Porter with Billy May and Anita O'Day and Billy May Swing Rodgers and Hart; both on Verve); Mel Tormé's Latin-flavoured album (¡Olé Tormé!: Mel Tormé Goes South of the Border with Billy May); Jane Russell's self-titled album on MGM Records in 1958; early albums by Jack Jones (Shall We Dance?) and Petula Clark (In Hollywood); one solitary session with Sarah Vaughan for Roulette Records in 1960, to record the single "The Green Leaves of Summer" and three other tracks. May arranged and conducted Once More with Feeling, a 1960 studio album by singer Billy Eckstine on Roulette.

May also arranged and recorded one album in Cleveland with Cosmic Records; Guess Who for artist Jerry Lee (Jerry Principe) at the Golden Key Club; and two more albums with Keely Smith, recorded nearly 40 years apart: CheroKeely Swings from 1962; and Keely Sings Sinatra, one of May's last projects, from 2001.

After Sinatra left Capitol to start his own label, Reprise Records, May continued to provide arrangements for him, off and on, for nearly thirty more years, working on the albums Sinatra Swings, Francis A. & Edward K. (with Duke Ellington) and Trilogy 1: The Past, as well as two charts for one of Sinatra's last ever solo recording sessions, "My Foolish Heart" and "Cry Me a River" (1988).

May arranged Sinatra's knockabout duet with Sammy Davis Jr., "Me and My Shadow", which was a hit single on both sides of the Atlantic in 1962, while he contributed to Sinatra's ambitious "Reprise Musical Repertory Theatre" project, providing a few arrangements for three of its four albums, South Pacific, Kiss Me, Kate and Guys and Dolls, May's charts being variously performed by Sinatra, Davis, Crosby, Dean Martin, Jo Stafford and Lou Monte and yielding a perennial Sinatra concert favourite, "Luck Be a Lady" from Guys and Dolls.

In 1958, May arranged a Christmas album on Warner Bros. Records featuring The Jimmy Joyce Singers, titled A Christmas to Remember. In 1983, May arranged the song "He Came Here For Me" for the Carpenters' An Old-Fashioned Christmas album on A&M Records.

== Musical style ==
May's charts often featured brisk tempos and intricate brass parts. One distinctive feature is his frequent use of trumpet mute devices. Another was a saxophone glissando, widely known as his "slurping saxes". In slower tempos, he sometimes utilized string sections; good examples of this aspect of his work include his brass chart for "These Foolish Things (Remind Me of You)" on the Cole album Just One of Those Things; his string arrangement of "April in Paris" on Sinatra's Come Fly With Me album; and his arrangement of "I Can't Get Started" on Keely Smith's Politely, which includes a nod to May in the lyrics ("Billy May arranged this for me").

== Film and television ==
May can be seen on trumpet with the Glenn Miller Orchestra in Sun Valley Serenade (1941), including a solo in "In the Mood", and in Orchestra Wives (1942).

In 1957, May made his debut as a film composer with Jane Russell's The Fuzzy Pink Nightgown; the soundtrack was released on Imperial Records. His film scores include the Rat Pack film Sergeants 3 (1962), Johnny Cool (1963), Tony Rome (1967), The Secret Life of an American Wife (1968), The Ballad of Andy Crocker (1969), and The Front Page (1974), and several big band arrangements used in the 1991 Disney film The Rocketeer, including Melora Hardin performing Cole Porter's "Begin the Beguine".

His compositions for television include "Somewhere in the Night", the theme for Naked City (1960), and his jazzy arrangement of "Flight of the Bumblebee" for The Green Hornet (1966) with trumpet by Al Hirt. He composed the Batgirl theme for Batman (1966). He and Nelson Riddle wrote music for episodes of Naked City (1960), Batman (1966), The Green Hornet (1966), Emergency! (1972), and CHiPs (1977).

May also arranged and produced the song "River of No Return" for Tennessee Ernie Ford to sing in the 1954 film of the same name starring Marilyn Monroe and Robert Mitchum. Billy May and His Orchestra are also credited as playing themselves in the 1956 film Nightmare, starring Edward G. Robinson, with May as music and vocal arranger of music by Herschel Burke Gilbert, who was the musical director.

== Compositions ==
May's compositions included "Long Tall Mama" and "Measure for Measure", recorded with the Glenn Miller Orchestra, "Boom Shot", written with Miller (May's wife Arletta originally received credit as co-author in his place) for the soundtrack of the 1942 movie Orchestra Wives, "Harlem Chapel Bells", which was performed with Glenn Miller and his Orchestra on April 2, 1941, and broadcast on the Chesterfield Moonlight Serenade radio program, "Lean Baby", "Fat Man Boogie", "Ping Pong", "Jooms Jones", "Gabby Goose", "Lumby", "Daisy Mae" and "Friday Afternoon" with Hal McIntyre, "Miles Behind", "The Wrong Idea" with Charlie Barnet, "Wings Over Manhattan", "Filet of Soul", "Mayhem", "Gin and Tonic", and "Solving the Riddle".

But his biggest hit as a composer was the children's song "I Tawt I Taw a Puddy Tat", which he recorded with Mel Blanc in 1950.

Another of May's arrangements, "Be My Host", served as the fanfare on The Newlywed Game when host Bob Eubanks announced the winning couple.

== Selected recordings ==
May arranged and conducted for many prominent singers. This list highlights some of his recordings that focused on his own bands, compositions and arrangements.

=== Singles ===
- 1952: "Charmaine" (Capitol 1919) charted for two weeks, peaked at No. 17
- 1954: "Don't Worry 'Bout Me" (Capitol F2787) reached No. 17 in the Billboard charts that year. Although Nelson Riddle conducted the session, Sinatra cites Billy May as the arranger during a May 1978 performance in Las Vegas.
- 1956: "Main title from The Man With the Golden Arm" (Capitol 3372) charted for fourteen weeks, peaked at No. 49; and UK No. 9

=== Albums ===
- 1948 Join the Band
- 1952 A Band Is Born
- 1952 A Big Band Bash
- 1953 Billy May's Bacchanalia
- 1954 Sorta-Dixie
- 1955 Sorta-May
- 1955 Naughty Operetta
- 1955 Arthur Murray Cha Cha Mambos
- 1957 Jimmie Lunceford in Hi-Fi
- 1957 Plays for Fancy Dancin'
- 1958 Billy May's Big Fat Brass
- 1960 Cha Cha! Billy May
- 1960 Pow!
- 1960 The Girls and Boys on Broadway
- 1961 Sergeants 3: Music From The Motion Picture Score
- 1962 The Sweetest Swingin' Sounds of Billy May
- 1962 Process 70
- 1962 No Strings
- 1963 Johnny Cool: Original Motion Picture Score
- 1963 Bill's Bag
- 1966 Billy May Today!

=== The Complete Billy May Sessions Personnel ===
The Billy May Sessions were included into the Nat "King" Cole's album called the same way.

With the help of Billy May's orchestra, all 43 of Nat King Cole's studio recordings, including two duets with Dean Martin and a repeat of "Walkin' My Baby Back Home" from 1961, are presented here for the first time as a single collection.

Personnel:

Harry "Sweets" Edison - Trumpet Pete Candoli - Trumpet Buddy Collette, Plas Johnson, Ted Nash, Willie Smith - Woodwinds Section Jimmy Rowles - Piano Johnny Collins - Guitar Charlie Harris - Bass Lee Young - Drums

== Bibliography ==
- Mirtle, Jack (1998). The Music of Billy May: A Discography. Greenwood Press. ISBN 978-0-313-30739-3.
