= Anthology: Down in Birdland =

Anthology: Down In Birdland

Compilation album by The Manhattan Transfer
- Released: October 1992 (Cassette Tape), November 1992 (CD)
- Genre: Vocal jazz
- Label: Rhino

The Manhattan Transfer chronology
The Offbeat of Avenues (1991)	Anthology: Down In Birdland (1992)	The Christmas Album (1992)

Anthology: Down In Birdland was a 2-Cassette Tape & 2CD album released by The Manhattan Transfer in 1992 on the Rhino Records label. It was the first album released by the group on this label.

This two disc and two tape set came with a 52-page booklet that gave an informative history of the group along with numerous photographs which depicted various stages of their history.

== Track listing ==
=== #1 ===
1. Trickle Trickle (Clarence Bassett) (Atlantic Single #3772, 1980) - 2:22
2. Gloria (Leon René) (from The Manhattan Transfer, 1975) - 3:00
3. Operator (William Spivery) (Atlantic Single #3292, 1975) - 3:12
4. Helpless (Lamont Dozier, Brian Holland, Eddie Holland) (Atlantic Single #3349, 1976) - 2:57
5. Ray's Rockhouse (Ray Charles, Jon Henricks) (Atlantic Single #89533, 1985) - 5:10
6. Heart's Desire (George Cox, James Dozier, Hugh X. Lewis, Bernard Purdie) (Live) (from Bop Doo-Wopp, 1984) - 2:45
7. Zindy Lou (Johnny Moore, Eddie Smith) (from Coming Out, 1976) - 2:54
8. Mystery (Rod Temperton) (Atlantic Single #89695, 1984) - 5:03
9. Baby Come Back To Me (The Morse Code Of Love) (Nick Santamaria) (Atlantic Single #89594, 1984) - 2:56
10. Route 66 (Bobby Troup) (from "Sharky's Machine OST", 1982) - 2:57
11. Java Jive (Milton Drake, Ben Oakland) (from The Manhattan Transfer, 1975) - 2:48
12. Chanson D'Amour (Wayne Shanklin) (Atlantic Single #3374, 1976) - 2:57
13. Foreign Affair (Tom Waits) (B-Side of "Trickle Trickle", Atlantic Single #3772, 1980) - 3:55
14. Smile Again (Bill Champlin, David Foster, Jay Graydon, Alan Paul) (Atlantic Single #3855, 1981) - 4:36
15. Spice of Life (Derek Bramble, Rod Temperton) (Atlantic Single #89786, 1983) - 3:43
16. The Speak Up Mambo (Cuentame) (Al Castellanos) (from Coming out, 1976) - 3:04
17. Soul Food To Go (Sina) (Djavan, Doug Fieber) (Atlantic Single #89156, 1986) - 5:17
18. So You Say (Esquinas) (Djavan, Amanda McBroom) (Atlantic Single #89094, 1988) - 4:59
19. Boy From New York City (George Davis, John T. Taylor) (Atlantic Single #3816, 1981) - 3:42
20. Twilight Zone/Twilight Tone (Jay Graydon, Bernard Herrmann, Alan Paul) (Atlantic Single #3649, 1980) - 6:06

=== #2 ===
1. Four Brothers (Jimmy Giuffre, Jon Hendricks) (B-side of "It's Not The Spotlight", Atlantic Single #3491, 1978) - 3:51
2. Blee Blop Blues (Count Basie, Jon Hendricks) (from Vocalese, 1985) - 3:06
3. Candy (Alex Kramer, Mack David, Joan Whitney) (from The Manhattan Transfer, 1975) - 3:30
4. A Gal in Calico (Arthur Schwartz, Leo Robin) (from Pastiche, 1978) - 2:42
5. Love for Sale (Cole Porter) (from Pastiche, 1978) - 4:01
6. On a Little Street in Singapore (Peter DeRose, Billy Hill) (from Pastiche, 1978) - 3:18
7. Tuxedo Junction (Erskine Hawkins, William Johnson, Buddy Feyne, Julian Dash) (B-side of "Operator", Atlantic Single #3292, 1975) - 3:06
8. That Cat Is High (J. Mayo Williams) (from The Manhattan Transfer, 1975) - 2:55
9. Body and Soul (Johnny Green, Edward Heyman, Robert Sour, Frank Eyton) (B-side of "Twilight Zone/Twilight Tone", Atlantic Single #3649, 1980) - 4:30
10. Meet Benny Bailey (Quincy Jones, Jon Hendricks) (from Vocalese, 1985) - 3:35
11. Sing Joy Spring (Clifford Brown, Jon Hendricks) (from Vocalese, 1985) - 7:13
12. To You (Thad Jones) (from Vocalese, 1985) - 3:57
13. Down South Camp Meetin' (Fletcher Henderson, Irving Mills, Jon Hendricks) (from Bodies and Souls, 1983) - 3:03
14. Until I Met You (Corner Pocket) (Freddie Green. Don Wolf) (B-side of "Smile Again", Atlantic Single #3855, 1981) - 5:22
15. Why Not! (Manhattan Carnival) (Michel Camilo, Julie Eigenberg) (B-side of "American Pop", Atlantic Single #89720, 1983) - 2:36
16. Another Night In Tunisia (Dizzy Gillespie, Jon Hendricks, Frank Paparelli) (B-side of "Ray's Rockhouse", Atlantic Single #89533, 1985) - 4:15
17. Capim (Djavan) (from Brasil, 1987) - 5:11
18. A Nightingale Sang in Berkeley Square (Manning Sherwin, Eric Maschwitz) (from Mecca for Moderns, 1981) - 3:52
19. Birdland (Joe Zawinul, Jon Hendricks) (Atlantic Single #3636, 1979) - 6:01
