= Live (1987 Manhattan Transfer album) =

Live album by The Manhattan Transfer
- Released: June 1987
- Recorded: February 20–21, 1986
- Venue: Nakano Sunplaza Hall, Tokyo
- Genre: Vocal jazz
- Label: Atlantic
- Producer: Tim Hauser

The Manhattan Transfer chronology
Vocalese (1985)	Live (1987)	Brasil (1987)

Live is the eleventh album released by The Manhattan Transfer. It was recorded live at the Nakano Sunplaza Hall in Japan on February 20 and 21, 1986. It was released in June 1987.

This was the group's third live album, and the first live album with Cheryl Bentyne in the group.

== Track listing ==
CD
No.	Title	Writer(s)	Length
1.	"Four Brothers"	Jimmy Giuffre, Jon Hendricks	3:53
2.	"Rambo"	Count Basie, J. J. Johnson, Jon Hendricks	3:44
3.	"(You Should) Meet Benny Bailey"	Quincy Jones, Jon Hendricks	3:06
4.	"Airegin"	Sonny Rollins, Jon Hendricks	3:20
5.	"To You"	Jimmy Giuffre, Thad Jones	3:59
6.	"Sing Joy Spring"	Clifford Brown, Jon Hendricks	6:19
7.	"Move"	Denzil Best, Jon Hendricks, Paul Wash	2:46
8.	"That's Killer Joe"	Benny Golson, Jon Hendricks	4:52
9.	"The Duke of Dubuque"	Bill Faber, James Marchant, Lawrence Royal	2:34
10.	"Gloria"	Adam R. Levy, Esther Navarro	2:53
11.	"On the Boulevard"	Richard Page	3:35
12.	"Shaker Song"	David Lasley, Allee Willis	3:51
13.	"Ray's Rockhouse"	Ray Charles, Jon Hendricks	5:15

== Personnel ==
The Manhattan Transfer

- Cheryl Bentyne, Tim Hauser, Alan Paul and Janis Siegel – vocals

The Band

- Yaron Gershovsky – keyboards, musical director
- Wayne Johnson – guitars
- Alex Blake – bass guitar, acoustic bass
- Buddy Williams – drums, Yamaha BX-1 headless bass
- Don Roberts – reeds

Production

- Producer – Tim Hauser
- Recording engineer – Seigen Ono
- Remix engineer – Brian Malouf
- Mixing on Track 8 – Ed Thacker
- Digital sequencing – David Collins
- CD mastering – Stephen Innocenzi
- Original mastering – Stephen Marcussen
- Art direction and design – Fayette Hauser
- Remixed at Post Logic Studios (Hollywood, California) and Can-Am Recorders (Tarzana, California).
- Mastered at Precision Lacquer (Hollywood, California).

== Sources ==
- The Manhattan Transfer Official Website
