= The Very Best of The Manhattan Transfer =

The Very Best of the Manhattan Transfer

Greatest hits album by The Manhattan Transfer
- Released: January 1994
- Genre: Jazz
- Labels: Atlantic, Rhino

The Manhattan Transfer chronology
The Christmas Album (1992)	The Very Best of the Manhattan Transfer (1994)	Meets Tubby the Tuba (1994)

The Very Best Of The Manhattan Transfer is a compilation album of The Manhattan Transfer released in 1994 on the Atlantic Records label.

This album is a selection of the core songs of the group, spanning more than twenty years.

== Track listing ==
1. "Boy From New York City" (George Davis, John T. Taylor John Taylor) (3:40)
2. "Trickle Trickle" (Clarence Bassett) (2:20)
3. "Gloria" (Esther Navarro) (2:58)
4. "Operator" (William Spivery) (3:11)
5. "Tuxedo Junction" (Erskine Hawkins, William Johnson, Julian Dash, Buddy Feyne) (3:04)
6. "Four Brothers" (Jimmy Giuffre, Jon Hendricks) (3:48)
7. "Ray's Rockhouse" (Ray Charles, Jon Hendricks) (5:08)
8. "Soul Food to Go (Sina)" (Djavan, Doug Fieger) (5:15)
9. "Spice of Life" (Derek Bramble, Rod Temperton) (3:41)
10. "Baby Come Back to Me (The Morse Code of Love)" (Nick Santamaria) (2:54)
11. "Candy" (Mack David, Alex Kramer, Joan Whitney Kramer) (3:28)
12. "A Nightingale Sang In Berkeley Square" (Manning Sherwin, Eric Maschwitz) (3:50)
13. "Birdland" (Joe Zawinul, Jon Hendricks) (6:01)
14. "Java Jive" (Milton Drake, Ben Oakland) (2:46)
15. "Route 66" (Bobby Troup) (2:55)
16. "Twilight Zone/Twilight Tone" (Jay Graydon, Bernard Herrmann, Alan Paul) (6:06)

== Album Cover ==
The original cover of this album featured a band photo featuring Laurel Massé. Though it was almost immediately pulled from store shelves, and replaced with the more familiar photo including Cheryl Bentyne, a limited amount made it into circulation.
