= The Manhattan Transfer Meets Tubby the Tuba =

Meets Tubby the Tuba

Studio album by The Manhattan Transfer
- Released: March 1994
- Recorded: October 1993
- Studio: Philharmonic Center for the Arts, Naples, Florida (music); Signet Sound Studios, LA, CA (voices)
- Genre: Jazz
- Length: 53:19
- Label: Summit Records; D'Note Classics
- Producer: Joseph Magee; Norman Newell; Timothy Russell

The Manhattan Transfer chronology
The Very Best of The Manhattan Transfer (1994)	Meets Tubby the Tuba (1994)	Tonin' (1995)

The Manhattan Transfer Meets Tubby The Tuba is a children's studio album released by The Manhattan Transfer in 1994 on the Summit Records label. It features music by George Kleinsinger and stories by Paul Tripp. This is the group's only children's recording, offering a rendition of the 1945 children's classic that teaches the important lesson: "Be yourself; you can't be anybody else!". This album was nominated for the Grammy Award for Best Musical Album for Children.

== Track listing ==
No.	Title	Length
1.	"Tubby the Tuba"	13:55
2.	"Tubby at the Circus"	10:59
3.	"Tubby Meets a Jazz Band"	11:37
4.	"The Further Adventures of Tubby the Tuba"	16:23
Total length:		53:19

== Personnel ==
- Timothy Russell – conductor
- The Naples Philharmonic – orchestra
- George Kleinsinger – music
- Paul Tripp – text

The Manhattan Transfer

- Tim Hauser – vocals, Tubby (1–2, 4)
- Alan Paul – vocals, Bullfrog (1), Elephant (2)
- Cheryl Bentyne – vocals, Tubby's Idea (2)
- Janis Siegel – vocals

The Jazz Band (3)

- Tommy Johnson – tuba as Tubby
- Paul Votapek – clarinet
- Matthew Sonneborn – trumpet
- Michael Zion – trombone
- Cynthia Dallas – piano

Production

- D. Michael Kelly – executive producer
- Joseph Magee – producer
- Norman Newell – producer
- Timothy Russell – producer, sleeve notes
- David Schildkret – sleeve notes
- Joseph Magee – engineer (recording, mixing)
- Fred Vogler – assistant engineer
- Tom Hardisty – assistant engineer
- Ralph Sauer – typography
- Bob Carey – photography
- Jack Graham – illustration
- Bill Levy – artwork
- David Hickman – artwork
