= The Chick Corea Songbook =

Studio album by The Manhattan Transfer
- Released: September 29, 2009
- Genre: Vocal jazz
- Label: Four Quarters Entertainment
- Producer: The Manhattan Transfer, Yusuf Gandhi

The Manhattan Transfer chronology
The Symphony Sessions (2006)	The Chick Corea Songbook (2009)	The Junction (2018)

The Chick Corea Songbook is the twenty-second studio album released by The Manhattan Transfer on September 29, 2009. The album features The Manhattan Transfer's interpretations of several Chick Corea compositions, including a song written by Corea for this album. The executive producer was Yusuf Gandhi. It was the final album with Tim Hauser, who died in between the release of this album and their subsequent album.

== Reviews ==
Professional ratings
Review scores
Source	Rating
All About Jazz	
Allmusic	3.5/5 stars
DownBeat	3.5/5 stars

All About Jazz editor Jerry D'Souza stated regarding this album, "Manhattan Transfer is back, and in top-notch form with a marvelous blend of melody and song." Regarding individual songs, he added, "Spain" is magical. The snap and crackle are done to a nicety, the arrangement opening the door to gently cascading harmonies and embracing solo singing," "The Story of Anna & Armando (Armando's Rhumba)" is flamboyant, the vocals swaying and resounding in harmony within the balmy atmosphere of the lyrics".

DownBeat reviewer Philip Booth awarded 3.5 stars to the album. He wrote, "it’s difficult to deny the appeal of these voices, cascading and leapfrogging on 'Another Roadside Attraction (Space Circus)' and illuminating a story-song about Corea’s parents on 'The Story Of Anna & Armando (Armando’s Rhumba)' ".

== Track listing ==
No.	Title	Writer(s)	Length
1.	"Free Samba"	Corea	5:15
2.	"Spain (I Can Recall) Prelude"	Joaquín Rodrigo, Al Jarreau, Artie Maren, Corea	3:11
3.	"Spain (I Can Recall)"	Rodrigo, Jarreau, Maren, Corea	6:37
4.	"One Step Closer (The One Step)"	Van Dyke Parks, Corea, Tim Hauser	5:16
5.	"Children's Song #15"	Corea	1:16
6.	"500 Miles High"	Corea, Neville Potter	6:52
7.	"Another Roadside Attraction (Space Circus)"	Parks, Corea, Hauser, Basie Hauser	4:21
8.	"Time's Lie"	Corea, Potter	3:55
9.	"La Chanson Du Bébé (Children's Song #1)"	Janis Siegel, Corea, Cheryl Bentyne	2:32
10.	"Ragtime in Pixiland (Pixiland Rag)"	Corea	1:46
11.	"The Story of Anna & Armando (Armando's Rhumba)"	Siegel, Corea	6:15
12.	"Free Samba (Extended Version)"	Corea	8:16

== Personnel ==
The Manhattan Transfer

- Cheryl Bentyne – vocals
- Tim Hauser – vocals
- Alan Paul – vocals, synthesizers
- Janis Siegel – vocals, arrangements

Additional personnel

- Chick Corea – keyboards, Yamaha Motif XS8, arrangements
- Yaron Gershovsky – keyboards, Fender Rhodes, acoustic piano, programming, arrangements, backing vocals
- Edsel Gomez – acoustic piano, arrangements
- Bais Haus – synthesizers, drum programming
- Fred Hersch – acoustic piano, arrangements
- Scott Kinsey – keyboards, arrangements
- Ramón Stagnaro – acoustic guitar
- Christian McBride – acoustic bass
- John Benitez – double bass, backing vocals
- Jimmy Earl – bass guitar
- John Herbert – acoustic bass
- Gary Wicks – acoustic bass, bass guitar
- Vince Cherico – drums
- Billy Drummond – drums
- Steve Hass – drums
- Gary Novak – drums
- Alex Acuña – percussion
- Airto Moreira – percussion
- Luis Quintero – percussion
- Joe Passaro – marimba
- Ronnie Cuber – baritone saxophone
- Steve Tavaglione – sopranino saxophone
- Lou Marini – flute, alto flute
- Don Shelton – whistle
- Conrad Herwig – trombone
- Mike Panella – trumpet
- Robert Rodriguez – trumpet
- Corey Allen – arrangements
- Michele Weir – arrangements

Production

- The Manhattan Transfer – producers
- Yusuf Gandhi – executive producer, album concept
- Bill Airey Smith – engineer, mixing
- Scott Noll – engineer, mixing
- Mark Wilder – mastering
- Brian Bacchus – album coordinator
- Burton Yount – art direction, design
