= Tonin' =

Studio album by The Manhattan Transfer
- Released: January 24, 1995
- Recorded: 1994
- Studios: Conway Studios (Hollywood, California); Record One (Sherman Oaks, California); Right Track Recording, The Hit Factory, The Power Station and Unique Recording Studios (New York City, New York); Crescent Moon Studios (Miami, Florida); Mountain Studios (Montreux, Switzerland)
- Genre: Vocal jazz
- Length: 51:28
- Label: Atlantic
- Producer: Arif Mardin

The Manhattan Transfer chronology
Meets Tubby the Tuba (1994)	Tonin' (1995)	Man-Tora! Live in Tokyo (1996)

Tonin' is the sixteenth studio album by The Manhattan Transfer. It was released in 1995 on Atlantic Records. The expression "tonin'" is associated with the vocal groups of the 1950s and 1960s. The songs on this album are favorites of the band's from that era. Singer-songwriter Laura Nyro makes one of her last performances on this recording.

== Track listing ==
1. "Let's Hang On!" (Bob Crewe, Sandy Linzer, Denny Randell) (with Frankie Valli) - 4:41
2. "Groovin'" (Eddie Brigati, Felix Cavaliere) (with Felix Cavaliere of The Rascals) - 4:09
3. "It's Gonna Take a Miracle" (Teddy Randazzo, Lou Stallman, Bob Weinstein) (with Bette Midler) - 3:56
4. "I Second That Emotion" (Al Cleveland, Smokey Robinson) (with Smokey Robinson) - 3:40
5. "La-La (Means I Love You)" (Thom Bell, William "Poogie" Hart) (with Laura Nyro) - 4:36
6. "Too Busy Thinking About My Baby" (Norman Whitfield, Barrett Strong, Janie Bradford) (with Phil Collins) - 4:44
7. "The Thrill Is Gone" (Roy Hawkins, Rick Darnell) (with Ruth Brown and B.B. King) - 6:07
8. "Hot Fun in the Summertime" (Sylvester "Sly Stone" Stewart) (with Chaka Khan) - 4:17
9. "Along Comes Mary" (Tandyn Almer) - 3:34
10. "Dream Lover" (Bobby Darin) (with James Taylor) - 4:53
11. "Save the Last Dance for Me" (Doc Pomus, Mort Shuman) (with Ben E. King) - 4:05
12. "God Only Knows" (Brian Wilson, Tony Asher) - 2:46

== Personnel ==
The Manhattan Transfer

- Cheryl Bentyne – backing vocals, lead vocals (5, 8, 11), vocals (12)
- Tim Hauser – backing vocals, vocal arrangements (1, 4, 6, 8, 9), additional arrangements (1), lead vocals (6, 8, 9), vocals (12)
- Alan Paul – backing vocals, vocal arrangements (1, 2, 10, 11), additional arrangements (1), lead vocals (2, 8–10), arrangements (2, 10), vocals (12)
- Janis Siegel – backing vocals, lead vocals (1, 3, 7, 8), vocal arrangements (3, 4, 5), additional arrangements (8), vocals (12)

Musicians and Guests

- Clay Ostwald – keyboards (1), Synclavier programming (1), arrangements (1), horn arrangements (1)
- Jorgé Casas – Synclavier programming (1), bass (1), arrangements (1), horn arrangements (1)
- Robbie Buchanan – keyboards (2, 3, 5, 8–11), synthesizers (2, 3, 5, 8–11), additional keyboards (10)
- Steve Skinner – programming (2, 4, 6, 8, 9), additional keyboards (2, 8, 11), arrangements (2, 4, 6, 8, 9), keyboards (6)
- Mark Mann – additional programming (2, 3, 8–11)
- Randy Kerber – keyboards (4), synthesizers (4)
- Tom Ranier – additional synthesizers (4)
- Laura Nyro – acoustic piano (5), lead vocals (5), arrangements (5)
- Joe Mardin – programming (5), percussion (5), live drums (6), cymbals (6), hi-hat (6)
- Greg Phillinganes – keyboards (7)
- Robbie Kondor – additional keyboards (9), programming (10, 11), arrangements (10, 11)
- Mike Finnigan – Hammond B3 organ (11)
- Rene Toledo – guitars (1)
- Michael Landau – guitars (2, 3, 8)
- Paul Jackson Jr. – guitars (4, 6)
- Michael Thompson – guitars (4, 9)
- David Spinozza – guitars (5)
- B.B. King – lead guitar (7)
- David Williams – guitars (7)
- Dean Parks – guitars (9–11)
- Abraham Laboriel – bass guitar (3)
- Neil Stubenhaus – bass guitar (4, 6)
- Will Lee – bass guitar (5)
- Dave Marotta – bass guitar (7)
- Jimmy Johnson – bass guitar (9, 11)
- Mike Porcaro – bass guitar (10)
- Mike Baird – drums (2, 3, 8, 11)
- John Robinson – drums (4, 9)
- Chris Parker – drums (5)
- Harvey Mason – drums (7)
- Carlos Vega – drums (10)
- Edwin Bonila – percussion (1)
- Luis Conte – percussion (1, 2, 8)
- Lenny Castro – percussion (2, 4, 8)
- Paulinho da Costa – percussion (11)
- Chris Hunter – saxophones (1, 4)
- Roger Rosenberg – saxophones (1, 4)
- Joel Peskin – alto saxophone (3), flute (9), tenor saxophone (10)
- Danny Wilensky – tenor saxophone (6)
- Herb Besson – trombone (1, 4)
- Tony Cadlic – trumpet (1, 4)
- Jim Hines – trumpet (1, 4)
- Tommy Morgan – harmonica (2)
- Arif Mardin – string arrangements, horn arrangements (1), arrangements (2–11), additional vocal arrangements (7, 9)
- Mervyn Warren – vocal arrangements (7, 12), vocal conductor (12)
- Corey Allen – vocal arrangements (8, 9)
- Gene Orloff – concertmaster
- Frank DeCaro – musical contractor
- Frankie Valli – lead vocals (1)
- Felix Cavaliere – lead vocals (2)
- Bette Midler – lead vocals (3)
- Smokey Robinson – lead vocals (4)
- Phil Collins – lead vocals (6)
- Ruth Brown – lead vocals (7)
- Chaka Khan – lead vocals (8)
- Ben E. King – lead vocals (11)

== Production ==
- Arif Mardin – producer
- Michael O'Reilly – recording, remixing
- Ed Cherney – additional engineer
- Jack Joseph Puig – additional engineer
- David Richards – additional engineer
- Jeremy Smith – additional engineer
- Chris Albert – assistant engineer
- Rich Castey – assistant engineer
- Matt Curry – assistant engineer
- Jay Millitsher – assistant engineer
- Carl Napps – assistant engineer
- Scott Perry – assistant engineer
- Marnie Riley – assistant engineer
- Rail Rogut – assistant engineer
- Rory Romano – assistant engineer
- George Marino – mastering at Sterling Sound (New York City, New York)
- Gloria Gabriel – project coordinator
- Thomas Bricker – art direction
- Firooz Zahedi – photography
- Vivian Turner – styling
- Enzo – hair
- Karen Kawahara – make-up
- Kareen Boursier – grooming
- Lindsay Scott Management, Inc. – management
