= An Acapella Christmas =

Studio album by The Manhattan Transfer
- Released: November 2004 (Japan); October 2006 (US)
- Genres: A cappella, Christmas music, vocal jazz
- Labels: King (Japan); Rhino (US)
- Producer: Tim Hauser

The Manhattan Transfer chronology
Vibrate (2004)	An Acapella Christmas (2004)	The Symphony Sessions (2006)

An Acapella Christmas is the twentieth studio album released by The Manhattan Transfer in 2004 on the King Records label. The album was initially released in Japan and was later released in the U.S. on October 3, 2006, on Rhino Records.

== Track listing ==
1. "Jingle Bells" (James Lord Pierpont) - 3:40
2. "White Christmas" (Irving Berlin) - 4:18
3. "Christmas Time Is Here" (Vince Guaraldi, Lee Mendelson) - 5:13
4. "Good King Wenceslas" (traditional, lyrics by John Mason Neale) - 1:56
5. "Toyland" (Victor Herbert, Glen MacDonough) - 4:54
6. "My Grown-Up Christmas List" (David Foster, Linda Thompson-Jenner) - 4:18
7. "Merry Christmas Baby" (Lou Baxter, Johnny Moore) - 3:17
8. "I'll Be Home for Christmas" (Walter Kent, Kim Gannon, Buck Ram) - 3:39
9. "Christmas Is Coming" (traditional) - 1:49
10. "Winter Wonderland" (Felix Bernard, Richard B. Smith) - 2:46

== Personnel ==
The Manhattan Transfer

- Cheryl Bentyne – vocals
- Tim Hauser – vocals, vocal arrangements (9)
- Alan Paul – vocals, vocal arrangements (1)
- Janis Siegel – vocals, vocal percussion (2), vocal arrangements (2)

Additional personnel

- Yaron Gershovsky – vocal arrangements (2, 8), additional voicings (4)
- Roger Treece – vocal percussion (2), vocal arrangements (3, 5), arrangements (9)
- Gladys Pitcher – vocal arrangements (4)
- Zoë Allen – choir (4), vocals (6)
- Lily Hauser – choir (4)
- Basie Hauser – choir (4)
- Arielle Paul – choir (4)
- Keely Pickering – choir (4)
- Gabriel Skoletsky – choir (4)
- Mark Kibble – vocal arrangements (6)
- Jack Scandura – vocal arrangements (7)
- Thomas Baraka DiCandia – arrangements (9)
- Corey Allen – arrangements (10)

=== Production ===
- Tim Hauser – producer, mastering
- Roger Treece – co-producer
- Thomas Baraka DiCandia – recording, remixing, mastering
- Michael Wallace – additional engineer
- Yaron Gershovsky – pre-production supervision
- Kiyoshi Osada – artwork
- Lee Ann Licht – booklet photography
- Hideo Oida – back cover photography

Studios

- Recorded and Mastered at TGV Studios (Sun Valley and LaTuna Canyon, California).
