= Vibrate (The Manhattan Transfer album) =

Studio album by The Manhattan Transfer
- Released: September 28, 2004
- Genre: Jazz
- Label: Telarc International Corporation
- Producer: The Manhattan Transfer

The Manhattan Transfer chronology
Couldn't Be Hotter (2003)	Vibrate (2004)	An Acapella Christmas (2004)

Vibrate is the nineteenth studio album by The Manhattan Transfer. It was released on September 28, 2004, on Telarc International Corporation.

The album is available in three formats: Super Audio CD, CD, and MP3 download.

== Track listing ==
The track listing:

1. "Walkin' in N.Y." (Brenda Russell) - 3:55
2. "Greek Song" (Rufus Wainwright) - 4:43
3. "Vibrate" (Rufus Wainwright) - 4:30
4. "The New JuJu Man (Tutu)" (Marcus Miller, Jon Hendricks) - 5:43
5. "Doodlin'" (Horace Silver) - 5:26
6. "The Twelfth" (John Yano) - 4:13
7. "First Ascent" (Billy Hulting, Bob Mair, Alan Paul) - 5:31
8. "Core of Sound" (Modinha) (Antônio Carlos Jobim, Vinicius de Moraes, Alan Paul) - 4:58
9. "Feel Flows" (Jack Rieley, Carl Wilson) - 5:09
10. "Embraceable You" (George Gershwin, Ira Gershwin) - 4:11
11. "Come Softly to Me / I Met Him on a Sunday" (Gretchen Christopher, Barbara Ellis, Gary Troxel / Shirley Owens, Addie "Micki" Harris, Beverly Lee, Gary Troxel) - 4:39

== Personnel ==
The Manhattan Transfer

- Cheryl Bentyne – vocals
- Tim Hauser – vocals
- Alan Paul – vocals
- Janis Siegel – vocals

Musicians

- Yaron Gershovsky – acoustic piano (1, 2, 5, 10, 11), keyboards (1, 2, 5), additional keyboards (4)
- Héctor del Curto – bandoneon (3)
- Gil Goldstein – electric piano (4, 9), acoustic piano (7, 8), accordions (9)
- John Yano – instrumental programming (6), guitars (6)
- Thomas Baraka DiCandia – lead guitar (2), guitar (9)
- Fats Kaplin – acoustic guitar (2), mandolin (2)
- Doug Livingston – pedal steel guitar (2)
- Ramesh Mishra – sarangi (2)
- John Pizzarelli – acoustic guitar (8), guitar (9)
- Will Lee – bass (1, 2, 8, 9), fretless bass (4, 7)
- Richie Goods – acoustic bass (3, 5), bass (6, 11)
- Steve Hass – drums (1, 2, 4–7, 9, 11), cowbell (1), hi-hat (2), tambourine (2), loop programming (4), additional percussion (11)
- Frank Colón – percussion (1, 3, 4, 7, 8, 11)
- Billy Hulting – percussion (7), marimba (7), vibraphone (7)
- Svet Stoyanov – bass marimba (7)
- Lew Soloff – trumpet (1, 4)
- Dave Eggar – cello (3, 8, 10)
- Lois Martin – viola (3, 10)
- Joyce Hammann – 1st violin (3, 10)
- Laura Seaton – 2nd violin (3, 10)

== References / Sources ==
- The Manhattan Transfer Official Website
