= The Spirit of St. Louis (album) =

Studio album by The Manhattan Transfer
- Released: October 2000
- Genre: Vocal jazz
- Label: Atlantic
- Producer: Craig Street

The Manhattan Transfer chronology
Boy from New York City and Other Hits (1997)	The Spirit of St. Louis (2000)	Couldn't Be Hotter (2003)

The Spirit of St. Louis is the eighteenth studio album released by The Manhattan Transfer in 2000 by Atlantic Records. This album is the group's tribute to jazz musician Louis Armstrong.

== Track listing ==
#	Song title	Composer	length
1	"Stompin' at Mahogany Hall"	Alan Paul, Spencer Williams	2:48
2	"The Blues Are Brewin'"	Louis Alter, Eddie DeLange	6:18
3	"Sugar"	Edna Alexander, Sidney Mitchell, Maceo Pinkard	3:28
4	"A Kiss to Build a Dream On"	Oscar Hammerstein II, Bert Kalmar, Harry Ruby	4:30
5	"Old Man Mose"	Louis Armstrong, Zilner Randolph	3:16
6	"Do You Know What It Means to Miss New Orleans?"	Eddie DeLange, Louis Alter	5:29
7	"Gone Fishin'"	Nick Kenny, Charles Kenny	4:11
8	"Nothing Could Be Hotter Than That"	Lilian Armstrong	5:47
9	"Blue Again"	Dorothy Fields, Jimmy McHugh	4:45
10	"When You Wish upon a Star"	Leigh Harline, Ned Washington	5:46

== Personnel ==
The Manhattan Transfer

- Cheryl Bentyne – vocals
- Tim Hauser – vocals
- Alan Paul – vocals
- Janis Siegel – vocals

Musicians

- Teddy Borowiecki – accordion (1, 6–7), organ (2, 4, 10), acoustic piano (3, 5, 8–10)
- Greg Leisz – guitars, mandolin
- Chris Bruce – guitars (1)
- Smokey Hormel – guitars (2)
- David Torn – guitars (4, 10)
- David Piltch – bass
- Abe Laboriel Jr. – drums
- Emil Richards – vibraphone (10)
- John Rotella – clarinet (3)
- Jackie Kelso – saxophones (3)
- Plas Johnson – saxophones (3)
- Steve Berlin – saxophones (5, 8)
- John Hassell – trumpet (10)

Production

- Craig Street – producer
- S. Husky Hoskulds – recording, mixing
- Ryan Boesch – engineer
- Kevin Deen – engineer
- Joe Zook – engineer
- Greg Calbi – mastering
- Benjamin Niles – art direction
- Larry Freemantle – design
- Chris Pyle – illustration
- Roy Zipstein – photography
