= The Symphony Sessions (The Manhattan Transfer album) =

Studio album by The Manhattan Transfer
- Released: October 3, 2006
- Recorded: March 3–4, 6–7, 2006
- Studio: Multiple studios in US and Czech Republic
- Genre: Vocal jazz, pop
- Label: Rhino
- Producer: Tim Hauser

The Manhattan Transfer chronology
An Acapella Christmas (2005)	The Symphony Sessions (2006)	The Chick Corea Songbook (2009)

The Symphony Sessions is the twenty-first studio album released by The Manhattan Transfer on October 3, 2006.

== Track listing ==
#	Song title	Composer/Songwriter	Length
1	"Route 66"	Bobby Troup	3:31
2	"Candy"	Alex Kramer, Mack David, Joan Whitney	3:20
3	"Embraceable You"	Ira Gershwin, George Gershwin	4:14
4	"That's the Way It Goes"	Raoul Cita, George Goldner, D. Parker	2:41
5	"A Nightingale Sang in Berkeley Square"	Manning Sherwin, Eric Maschwitz	5:25
6	"Because You Are All Heart" (Movement 2: A Portrait of Ella)	Alan Paul, Billy Strayhorn	5:01
7	"To You"	Jon Hendricks, Thad Jones	3:44
8	"Vibrate"	Rufus Wainwright	4:30
9	"Clouds (Nuages)"	Jon Hendricks, Django Reinhardt	6:47
10	"The Quietude"	Chuck Jonkey, Alan Paul	6:55
11	"The Offbeat of Avenues"	Cheryl Bentyne, Don Freeman, Ian Prince	4:24
12	"Birdland"	Jon Hendricks, Joe Zawinul	6:11

== Personnel ==
The Manhattan Transfer

- Cheryl Bentyne – vocals, vocal arrangements (11)
- Tim Hauser – vocals, vocal arrangements (4)
- Alan Paul – vocals, vocal arrangements (6, 10)
- Janis Siegel – vocals, vocal arrangements (2, 6, 12)

Musicians and Arrangements

- Yaron Gervoshsky – grand piano, musical director, orchestral arrangements (6), orchestra director (6, 12)
- John B. Williams – bass
- Steve Hass – drums
- David Glasser – saxophone
- Scott Kreitzer – saxophone
- Cliff Lyons – saxophone
- Roger Rosenberg – saxophone
- Andy Snitzer – saxophone
- Randy Andos – trombone
- Michael Boschen – trombone
- Birch Johnson – trombone
- Jimmy Hynes – trumpet
- Robert Millikan – trumpet
- Dave Stahl – trumpet
- Scott Wendholt – trumpet
- Prague Symphony Orchestra – orchestra
- Corey Allen – orchestra director (1–5, 7–12), orchestral arrangements (3, 5, 7, 9, 10, 11)
- Billy Byers – orchestral arrangements (1, 2)
- Charles Calello – orchestral arrangements (4)
- Gil Goldstein – orchestral arrangements (8)
- Joe Roccisano – orchestral arrangements (12)
- Al Capps – vocal arrangements (1)
- Fred Thaler – vocal arrangements (2)
- Gene Puerling – vocal arrangements (3, 5, 9)
- Dick Reynolds – vocal arrangements (7)
- Roger Treece – vocal arrangements (8)
- Ian Prince – vocal arrangements (11)

=== Production ===
- Tim Hauser – producer, mastering
- Corey Allen – orchestra producer (1–5, 7–12)
- Yaron Gervoshsky – orchestra producer (6, 12)
- Susumu Morikawa – executive producer
- Manfred Knoop – tracking engineer
- Hans Nielsen – orchestra engineer
- Michael Eric Hutchinson – vocal engineer, mixing, mastering
- Tom McCauley – additional engineer
- Tom Swift – additional engineer
- Takekazu Honda – A&R
- Lenka Dudova – assistant administration
- Juraj Durovic – orchestra management
- Kiyoshi Osada – artwork
- Junichi Yamashita – artwork coordinator
- Joan Allen – photography
- Michael Davenport – manager
- Juraj Durovic – orchestra manager
- Merlin Company – management company

Studios

- Recorded at Knoop Music (River Edge, New Jersey); Big Surprise Music (Encino, California); Smecky Music Studios (Czech Republic).
