= The Junction (The Manhattan Transfer album) =

Studio album by The Manhattan Transfer
- Released: March 30, 2018
- Studio: Leapyear Studio, Los Angeles
- Genre: Crossover jazz
- Label: BMG Rights Management
- Producer: Mervyn Warren

The Manhattan Transfer chronology
| The Chick Corea Songbook (2009) | The Junction (2018) | Fifty (2022) |

Professional ratings
Review scores
| Source | Rating |
|---|---|
| AllMusic | 3.5/5 stars |

The Junction is the twenty-third studio album by The Manhattan Transfer, released on March 30, 2018. This is their first album in nine years since their last album; The Chick Corea Songbook.

It was the first album by the group to feature Trist Curless on bass following the death of Tim Hauser in 2014.

== Track listing ==
| No. | Title | Writer(s) | Length |
|---|---|---|---|
| 1. | "Cantaloop (Flip Out!)" | Herbie Hancock, Rahsaan Kelly, Mel Simpson, Geoff Wilkinson | 4:43 |
| 2. | "Swing Balboa (Down on Riverside)" | Don Breithaupt, Alan Paul | 3:11 |
| 3. | "The Man Who Sailed Around His Soul" | Andy Partridge | 3:49 |
| 4. | "Blues for Harry Bosch" | Cheryl Bentyne, Grace Kelly | 4:24 |
| 5. | "Shake Ya Boogie" | Adam Dorn, Janis Siegel, Mervyn Warren | 4:23 |
| 6. | "Sometimes I Do" | Warren | 4:54 |
| 7. | "Ugly Man" | Rickie Lee Jones | 4:48 |
| 8. | "The Junction" | Trist Curless, Christopher Harrison, Warren | 4:56 |
| 9. | "Tequila/The Way of the Booze" | Daniel Flores, Paul | 3:04 |
| 10. | "The Paradise Within (Paradise Found)" | Les Baxter, Paul | 5:00 |

== Personnel ==
The Manhattan Transfer

- Alan Paul – vocals, vocal arrangement (2, 9), keyboards (2)
- Cheryl Bentyne – vocals
- Janis Siegel – vocals
- Trist Curless – vocals

Musicians

- Mervyn Warren – vocal arrangement (all tracks), horn arrangement (2, 3, 9), string arrangement (6), drum programming (all tracks), keyboards (all tracks), bass (2)
- Brian Benning – strings (6, 9, 10)
- Don Breithaupt – keyboards (2), drum programming (2)
- Can Canbolat – strings (6, 10)
- Adam Dorn (credited as Mocean Worker) – keyboards (5), drum programming (5)
- Eddie Ellis – guitar (2)
- Brandon Fields – saxophone (2, 3, 9)
- Scott Frankfurt – drums (4), percussion (4)
- Yaron Gershovsky – piano (1)
- Christopher Harrison – keyboards (8), drum programming (8)
- Paul Jackson Jr. – guitar (1, 6, 9)
- Grace Kelly – saxophone (4)
- Luisito Quintero – percussion (7)
- Ray Reinebach – strings (10)
- Jen Simone – strings (6)
- Knox Summerour – flugelhorn (3), trumpet (9)

Production

- Mervyn Warren – producer
