= Man-Tora! Live in Tokyo =

Live album by The Manhattan Transfer
- Released: April 1996
- Recorded: November 22–23, 1983
- Venue: Nakano Sunplaza Hall, Tokyo
- Genre: Vocal jazz
- Length: 47:34
- Label: Rhino
- Producer: Stephen K. Peeples, James Austin, Tim Hauser, Jack White

The Manhattan Transfer chronology
Tonin' (1995)	Man-Tora! Live in Tokyo (1996)	Swing (1997)

Man-Tora! Live in Tokyo is the fourth live album released by The Manhattan Transfer. The title is a shortening of Manhattan Toransufā (マンハッタン・トランスファー), the Japanese transliteration of the band's name. The songs were recorded during their 1983 Japan tour to promote their album Bodies and Souls at Tokyo's Nakano Sunplaza Hall. Some of the songs from these concerts also appeared on their 1984 album, Bop Doo-Wopp.

== Track listing ==
1. "Birdland" – (Joe Zawinul, Jon Hendricks) – 5:15
2. "Route 66" – (Bobby Troup) – 3:34
3. "Jeannine" – (Duke Pearson, Oscar Brown Jr.) – 5:44
4. "Malaise en Malaisie" – (Alain Chamfort, Serge Gainsbourg, Alan Paul) – 3:54
5. "Trickle Trickle" – (Clarence Bassett) – 2:25
6. "Boy from New York City" – (John Taylor, George Davis) – 3:44
7. "This Independence" – (John Capek, Marc Jordan) – 5:12
8. "Foreign Affair" – (Tom Waits) – 4:05
9. "Body and Soul" – (Johnny Green, Frank Eyton, Edward Heyman, Robert Sour) – 4:28
10. "Blue Champagne" – (Frank Ryerson, Grady Watts, Jimmy Eaton) – 2:34
11. "How High the Moon" – (Nancy Hamilton, Morgan Lewis) – 2:16
12. "Twilight Zone/Twilight Tone" – (Bernard Herrmann, Jay Graydon, Alan Paul) – 5:03
13. "Four Brothers" – (Jimmy Giuffre, Jon Hendricks) – 3:49
14. "Operator" – (William Spivery) – 3:00
15. "Spice of Life" – (Derek Bramble, Rod Temperton) – 3:32
16. "Tuxedo Junction" – (Erskine Hawkins, William Johnson, Buddy Feyne, Julian Dash) – 2:42
