= Extensions (The Manhattan Transfer album) =

Studio album by the Manhattan Transfer
- Released: October 31, 1979
- Studios: Dawnbreaker Studio, San Fernando, California
- Genres: Vocal jazz; pop; disco
- Length: 37:02
- Label: Atlantic
- Producer: Jay Graydon

The Manhattan Transfer chronology
The Manhattan Transfer Live (1978)	Extensions (1979)	Mecca for Moderns (1981)

Extensions is the fifth studio album by the Manhattan Transfer, released on October 31, 1979, by Atlantic Records.

Marking a new era for the group, the album was the first one with Cheryl Bentyne, who replaced Laurel Massé in early 1979. It was also their first album with Jay Graydon in the producer's chair and their first to contain songs that were hits in both the jazz and pop categories. The song "Twilight Zone/Twilight Tone" reached No. 4 on the Billboard Disco chart and No. 30 on the Hot 100. "Trickle, Trickle" reached No. 73 on the Hot 100. The album reached No. 55 on the Billboard Top LPs chart.

The most widely known song from this album, "Birdland" by Weather Report, won the Grammy Award for Best Jazz Fusion. Best Jazz Fusion Performance in 1981. Jon Hendricks wrote lyrics for the vocalese version on the album and Janis Siegel received a Grammy for her vocal arrangement of "Birdland".

== Critical reception ==
The New York Times wrote that the album "carries their exploration of group harmony to a level of seriousness that finally establishes them as the legitimate heirs of Lambert, Hendricks and Ross and the Hi-Lo's."

== Charts ==
Extensions debuted on Billboard's Top Pop Album chart on December 8, 1979.

== Track listing ==
No.	Title	Writer(s)	Length
1.	"Birdland"	Jon Hendricks, Joe Zawinul	6:00
2.	"Wacky Dust"	Stanley Adams, Oscar Levant	3:10
3.	"Nothin' You Can Do About It"	David Foster, Jay Graydon, Steve Kipner	4:25
4.	"Coo Coo-U"	Bill Loughborough, David "Buck" Wheat	2:13
5.	"Body and Soul"	Frank Eyton, Johnny Green, Edward Heyman, Robert Sour	4:26
6.	"Twilight Zone / Twilight Tone"	Bernard Herrmann / Jay Graydon, Alan Paul	6:05
7.	"Trickle Trickle"	Clarence Bassett	2:19
8.	"Shaker Song"	Jay Beckenstein, David Lasley, Allee Willis	4:30
9.	"Foreign Affair"	Tom Waits	3:54

== Personnel ==
The Manhattan Transfer

- Cheryl Bentyne – vocals, arrangements (7)
- Tim Hauser – vocals, arrangements (4, 7–8), vocal arrangement (8)
- Alan Paul – vocals, arrangements (6–7)
- Janis Siegel – vocals, vocal arrangement (1-2, 8), arrangements (7–8)

Musicians

- Michael Omartian – acoustic piano (1, 7), rhythm arrangements (1)
- Michael Boddicker – synthesizers (1, 4, 6), synthesizer programming (2), vocoder (4)
- Greg Mathieson – synthesizers (2), bass guitar (2), rhythm arrangements (2, 8), synth solo (3), arrangements (4), acoustic piano (8), Fender Rhodes (8)
- David Foster – acoustic piano (3), synthesizers (3), arrangements (3)
- Ian Underwood – synthesizers (3)
- Jay Graydon – vocal arrangements (2), synthesizers (3, 8), guitar (3, 6–7), arrangements (3, 6–7), muted guitars (6), guitar solo (6), additional vocals (6), gut-string guitar (8), synthesizer programming (8)
- Bill Mays – acoustic piano (5)
- Jai Winding – acoustic piano (6)
- Jimmy Wyble – rhythm guitar (2)
- Steve Lukather – rhythm guitar (6)
- Dean Parks – guitar (7), electric guitar (8)
- David Hungate – bass guitar (1–3, 6)
- Chuck Domanico – bass guitar (5)
- Abraham Laboriel – bass guitar (7)
- Andy Muson – bass guitar (8)
- Ralph Humphrey – drums (1–3, 5, 7)
- Jeff Porcaro – drums (1, 6), anvil (6), bongos (6)
- Alex Acuña – drums (8)
- Paulinho da Costa – congas (7), percussion (8)
- Richie Cole – alto saxophone (1; solo on 8)
- Don Roberts – piccolo (6), tenor saxophone solo (7)
- Phil Mattson – arrangements (5)
- Gene Puerling – arrangements (9)
- Clare Fischer – conductor (9)

Production

- Producer, Mixing and Overdub Tracking – Jay Graydon
- Basic Tracks recorded by Joseph Bogan and Bill Thomas.
- Basic Tracks recorded at Dawnbreaker Studios (San Fernando, California).
- Overdubs and Mixing at Garden Rake Studios (Studio City, California).
- Mastered by Bernie Grundman at A&M Studios (Hollywood, California).
- Musical Contractor – Frank DeCaro
- Art Direction and Design – Tako Ono
- Front Cover Illustration – Pater Sato
- Back Cover Photo – Matthew Rolston
- Costume Design – Jean-Paul Gaultier
