= Vocalese (album) =

1985 studio album by The Manhattan Transfer

Studio album by The Manhattan Transfer
- Released: September 3, 1985
- Recorded: 1985
- Studios: The Village Recorder (Los Angeles, California); Ocean Way Recording (Hollywood, California); Bill Schnee Studios (North Hollywood, California); Craig Harris Music (Studio City, California); Fantasy Studios (Berkeley, California); Can-Am Recorders (Tarzana, California); Clinton Recording Studios (New York City, New York)
- Genre: Vocal jazz
- Length: 45:29
- Label: Atlantic
- Producers: Tim Hauser; Martin Fischer

The Manhattan Transfer chronology
Bop Doo-Wopp (1984)	Vocalese (1985)	Live (1987)

Vocalese is the ninth studio album by Jazz band The Manhattan Transfer, released on September 3, 1985, on Atlantic Records. Recording sessions took place during 1985. Production came from Tim Hauser and Martin Fischer. This album is considered to be The Manhattan Transfer's most critically acclaimed album. It received 12 Grammy nominations, making it second only to Michael Jackson's Thriller as the most nominated individual album. It also received extremely high ratings from music critics, including a 4.5 out of 5 stars rating from AllMusic. The album peaked at number 2 on the Top Jazz Albums and number 74 on the Billboard 200. The album's title Vocalese refers to a style of music that sets lyrics to previously recorded jazz instrumental pieces. The vocals then reproduce the sound and feel of the original instrumentation. Jon Hendricks, proficient in this art, composed all of the lyrics for this album.

== Critical reception ==
- AllMusic

== Awards ==
This album earned the group Grammy Awards for:

- Best Jazz Vocal Performance, Duo or Group
- Best Vocal Arrangement for Two or More Voices for Cheryl Bentyne and Bobby McFerrin for their arrangement of "Another Night In Tunisia".

It also earned Best Jazz Vocal Performance, Male for Bobby McFerrin and Jon Hendricks for "Another Night In Tunisia".

== Track listing ==
CD
No.	Title	Writer(s)	Length
1.	"That's Killer Joe"	Benny Golson, Jon Hendricks	5:02
2.	"Rambo"	J J Johnson, Jon Hendricks	3:19
3.	"Airegin"	Sonny Rollins	3:19
4.	"To You"	Thad Jones	3:53
5.	"(You Should) Meet Benny Bailey"	Quincy Jones, Jon Hendricks	3:29
6.	"Another Night in Tunisia"	Dizzy Gillespie, Jon Hendricks, Frank Paparelli	4:12
7.	"Ray's Rockhouse"	Ray Charles, Jon Hendricks	5:06
8.	"Blee Blop Blues"	Count Basie, Jon Hendricks	3:01
9.	"Oh Yes, I Remember Clifford"	Benny Golson, Jon Hendricks	3:45
10.	"Sing Joy Spring"	Clifford Brown, Jon Hendricks	7:07
11.	"Move"	Denzil Best, Jon Hendricks	2:49
Total length:			45:29

== Personnel ==
The Manhattan Transfer

- Cheryl Bentyne – vocals, soloist (1–3, 5, 8), arrangements (6)
- Tim Hauser – vocals, soloist (1, 3, 10–11), arrangements (1)
- Alan Paul – vocals, soloist (1-4, 9), vocal arrangements (5, 7)
- Janis Siegel – vocals, soloist (1–3, 8, 10–11), vocal arrangements (1–3, 8, 10)

Musicians and Guests

- Yaron Gershovsky – synthesizers (1), arrangements (1), acoustic piano (2, 3, 5), vocal arrangements (5)
- John Robinson – drums (1)
- Grady Tate – drums (2, 8–9)
- Ralph Humphrey – drums (3, 5, 10–11)
- Philly Joe Jones – drums (4)
- Wayne Johnson – guitars (1, 3, 5), banjo (5)
- Dennis Wilson – arrangements and conductor (2, 8), trombone (9)
- Don Roberts – baritone saxophone (5, 11), tenor saxophone (9)
- Eric Dixon – saxophone (2, 7)
- Freddie Green – guitars (2, 8)
- Ray Brown – bass guitar (2, 8)
- Alex Blake – bass guitar (3, 5)
- Richard Davis – bass guitar (4)
- Ron Carter – bass guitar (9)
- John Patitucci – bass guitar (10)
- Marshall Hawkins – bass guitar (11)
- Kenny Hing – saxophone (2, 8)
- Marshal Royal – saxophone (2, 8)
- Johnny Williams – saxophone (2, 8)
- Clarence Banks – trombone (2, 8)
- Bill Hughes – trombone (2, 8)
- Charles Loper – trombone (2, 8)
- Mel Wanzo – trombone (2, 8)
- Sonny Cohn – trumpet (2, 8)
- Johnny Coles – trumpet (2, 8)
- Byron Stripling – trumpet (2, 8)
- The Count Basie Orchestra – orchestra (2, 8)
- Thad Jones – music supervisor (2, 8)
- Jon Hendricks – additional backing vocals (6), vocal soloist (7)
- Dick Reynolds – arrangements (4, 11)
- Casey Young – synthesizer programming (1)
- Danny House – saxophone (2)
- Bob Ojeda – trumpet (2)
- Tommy Flanagan – acoustic piano (4)
- The Four Freshmen: Mike Beisner, Bob Flanagan, Autie Goodman and Rod Henley – additional backing vocals (4)
- James Moody – tenor sax solo (5)
- Bobby McFerrin – bass vocal (6), vocal percussion (6), vocals (6), vocal arrangements (6)
- John Barnes – synthesizers (7), Yamaha TX816 (7), Fairlight CMI (7), Synclavier (7), vocoder (7), Linn 9000 (7), arrangements (7)
- Craig Harris – synthesizer voice (7), programming (7), vocoder programming (7), sampling (7)
- Danny Turner – saxophone (8)
- Snooky Young – trumpet (8)
- Phil Mattson – vocal arrangements (9)
- McCoy Tyner – acoustic piano (9)
- Dizzy Gillespie – trumpet solo (10)
- Walter Davis, Jr. – acoustic piano (10)
- Richie Cole – alto sax solo (11)
- Dick Hindman – acoustic piano (11)

Production

- Producers – Tim Hauser and Martin Fischer
- Management – Brian Avnet
- Recorded and Mixed by Elliot Scheiner
- Additional Engineers – Craig Harris, Gary Ladinsky and Brian Malouf.
- Assistant Engineers – Gene Curtis, Dan Garcia, Steve Katayama, Steve MacMillan, Dan Matovina, Tom Size and Jay Willis.
- Mixed at Sound Labs Hollywood (Hollywood, CA).
- Mastered by Bernie Grundman at Bernie Grundman Mastering (Hollywood, CA).
- Musical director – Bud Schaetzle
- Album coordination – Ivy Skoff
- Publishing coordination – Sue Yahm
- Art direction – Fayette Hauser and Nels Israelson
- Photography – Nels Israelson

== Charts ==
- US Billboard 200 – 74
- US Jazz Albums (Billboard) – 2
