= The Offbeat of Avenues =

Studio album by The Manhattan Transfer
- Released: August 13, 1991
- Genre: Vocal jazz
- Length: 55:41
- Label: Columbia
- Producer: Tim Hauser, Ian Prince, Jeff Lorber, Les Pierce, Gerald O'Brien, Don Freeman

The Manhattan Transfer chronology
| Brasil (1987) | The Offbeat of Avenues (1991) | Anthology: Down in Birdland (1992) |

The Offbeat Of Avenues was the thirteenth album released by The Manhattan Transfer on August 13, 1991, by Columbia Records.

This album is the first of two albums for Columbia Records. This album is also the first Manhattan Transfer album where the majority of the songs were either written or co-written by the members of the group.

== Awards ==
This album yielded the group a Grammy Award, in the category of Best Contemporary Jazz Performance for the song "Sassy". The lyrics for this song were written by Janis Siegel and Cheryl Bentyne; the music was composed by Janis Siegel and Bill Bodine.

== Track listing ==
CD
| No. | Title | Writer(s) | Length |
|---|---|---|---|
| 1. | "The Offbeat of Avenues" | Cheryl Bentyne, Don Freeman, Ian Prince | 4:55 |
| 2. | "Sassy" | Cheryl Bentyne, Bill Bodine, Janis Siegel | 4:49 |
| 3. | "10 Minutes Till the Savages Come" | Jeff Lorber, Janis Siegel, Brock Walsh | 3:58 |
| 4. | "What Goes Around Comes Around" | Alan Paul, Les Pierce | 4:51 |
| 5. | "Blue Serenade" | Tim Hauser, Van Dyke Parks | 3:40 |
| 6. | "Gentleman with a Family" | Cheryl Bentyne, Marc Jordan, Gerald O'Brien | 4:51 |
| 7. | "Women in Love" | David Batteau, Don Freeman | 6:19 |
| 8. | "A World Apart" | David Pack, Janis Siegel, Michael McDonald | 5:01 |
| 9. | "Confide in Me" | Donald Fagen | 4:11 |
| 10. | "The Quietude (Encuentro De Animales)" | Chuck Jonkey, Alan Paul | 6:13 |
| 11. | "Blues for Pablo" | Gil Evans, Jon Hendricks | 6:52 |
| Total length: | | | 55:41 |

== Personnel ==
The Manhattan Transfer

- Cheryl Bentyne – vocals, vocal arrangements (1, 6)
- Tim Hauser – vocals, sandpaper blocks (5)
- Alan Paul – vocals, vocal arrangements (4, 10), music arrangements (10)
- Janis Siegel – vocals, vocal arrangements (2, 3, 7, 8), vocal adaptation (11)

Musicians and Arrangers

- Ian Prince – synthesizers (1, 5), programming (1, 5), music arrangements (1, 5), vocal arrangements (1)
- John Beasley – synthesizers (2)
- Bill Bodine – synthesizers (2), programming (2), bass (2), music arrangements (2)
- Jeff Lorber – synthesizers (2, 3), drum programming (2), programming (3), music arrangements (3)
- Les Pierce – synthesizers (4, 8), programming (4, 8), music arrangements (4, 8), vocal arrangements (4, 7)
- Gerald O'Brien – synthesizers (6), programming (6), music arrangements (6)
- Don Freeman – synthesizers (7), programming (7), music arrangements (7)
- Yaron Gershovsky – acoustic piano (8)
- Larry Williams – programming (9), saxophone (9), music arrangements (9), horn arrangements (9)
- Erik Hanson – additional programming (9)
- Mike Finnigan – Hammond organ (9)
- Chuck Jonkey – synthesizers (10), programming (10), sounds (10) sitar (10), ethnic percussion (10), music arrangements (10)
- Mark Isham – synthesizers (11), programming (11), trumpet (11), music arrangements (11)
- Jamie Glaser – guitar (1, 9)
- Herb Pederson – acoustic guitar (6)
- Alec Milstein – slap bass (2)
- Leland Sklar – bass (9)
- Alex Blake – bass (10)
- Harvie Swartz – bass (11)
- John Robinson – drums (2, 6)
- Grady Tate – drums (3)
- Jeff Porcaro – drums (9)
- Connie Kay – drums (11)
- Frank Colón – ethnic percussion (10)
- Richard Elliot – tenor saxophone (1, 3)
- Bob Sheppard – saxophone (2)
- Phil Christlieb – saxophone (2, 9)
- Kevin Harris – tenor saxophone (5)
- Roger Lewis – baritone saxophone (5)
- Charles Joseph – trombone (5)
- Gary Grant – trumpet (2, 9)
- Jerry Hey – trumpet (2, 9), horn arrangements (2)
- Lew Soloff – trumpet solo (2)
- Gregory Davis – trumpet (5), horn arrangements (5)
- Kirk Joseph – sousaphone (5), tuba solo (5)
- Hector Vargas – quena (10), zamponia (10)
- Van Dyke Parks – vocal arrangements (5)
- David Pack – vocal arrangements (8)
- Mervyn Warren – vocal arrangements (9)
- Angelica Azero – narrator (10)

== Production ==
- Tim Hauser – producer
- Ian Prince – producer (1, 5)
- Jeff Lorber – producer (3)
- Les Pierce – producer (4, 8)
- Gerald O'Brien – additional producer (6)
- Don Freeman – producer (7)
- John Cutcliffe – executive producer
- Gary Lux – engineer, mixing
- Leslie Ann Jones – second engineer
- Marnie Riley – second engineer
- Ted Blaisdell – additional engineer
- Stephen Krause – additional engineer
- Steve Miller – additional engineer
- Elliott Peters – additional engineer
- Ken Felton – assistant engineer
- Bernie Grundman – mastering
- Nancy Donald – art direction, design
- D. Gorton – photography

Studios

- Recorded at Conway Studios (Hollywood, California); Devonshire Sound Studios (North Hollywood, California); Studio 55 (Los Angeles, California); RPM Studios (New York City, New York); Paisley Park Studios (Minneapolis, Minnesota).
- Mixed at Conway Studios and Capitol Studios (Hollywood, California).
- Mastered at Bernie Grundman Mastering (Hollywood, California).

== References / Sources ==
- The Manhattan Transfer Official Website
