= Alex Blake (musician) =

Jazz bass player (born 1951)

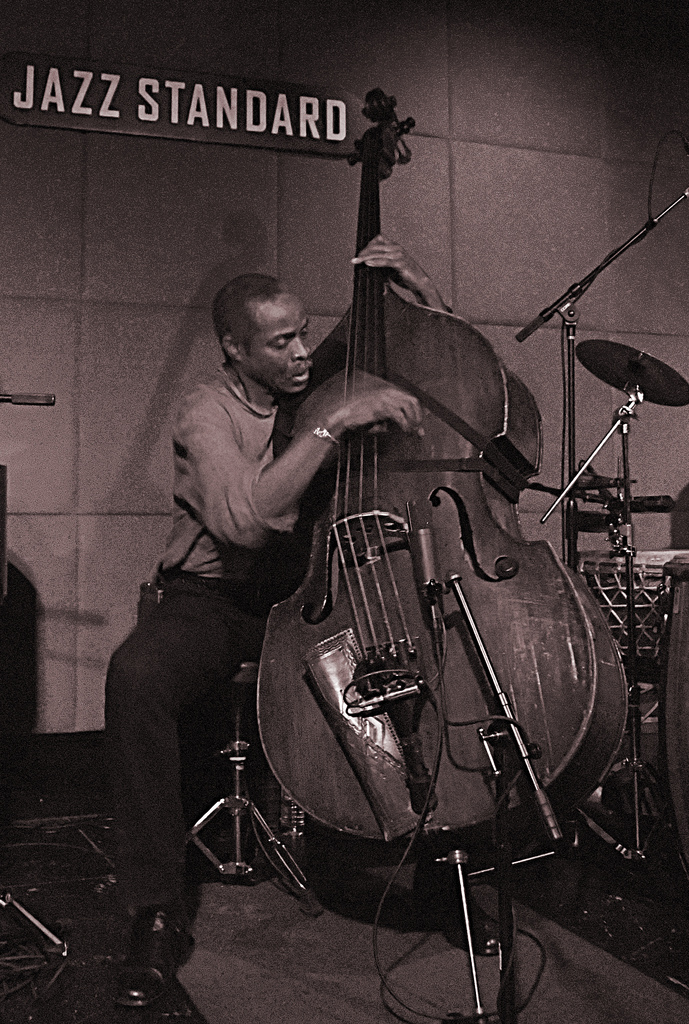
- Blake performing with Randy Weston, Billy Harper and Neil Clarke at the Jazz Standard, March 2007

Background information
- Born: Alejandro Blake Fearon Jr. December 21, 1951 (age 74)
- Genre: Jazz
- Occupation: Musician
- Instruments: Double bass, bass guitar
- Website: alexblakebass.com

Alex Blake (born Alejandro Blake Fearon Jr., December 21, 1951) is a jazz bass player.

== Biography ==
Blake was born in 1951 in Panama and moved to the United States at the age of seven, growing up in Brooklyn, New York. He began his career with Sun Ra's band Arkestra. Blake became one of the major proponents of the fusion movement in the late 1970s through his writing and performances with Lenny White and Billy Cobham.

A live performance compilation was released by Bubble Core Records in 2000 titled Now Is the Time: Live at the Knitting Factory. The album featured Blake's own quintet, which included Pharoah Sanders, Victor Jones, John Hicks and Neil Clarke (percussion).

In addition to leading his own group, Blake also performed and recorded with Randy Weston, as well as with other musicians.

== Discography ==
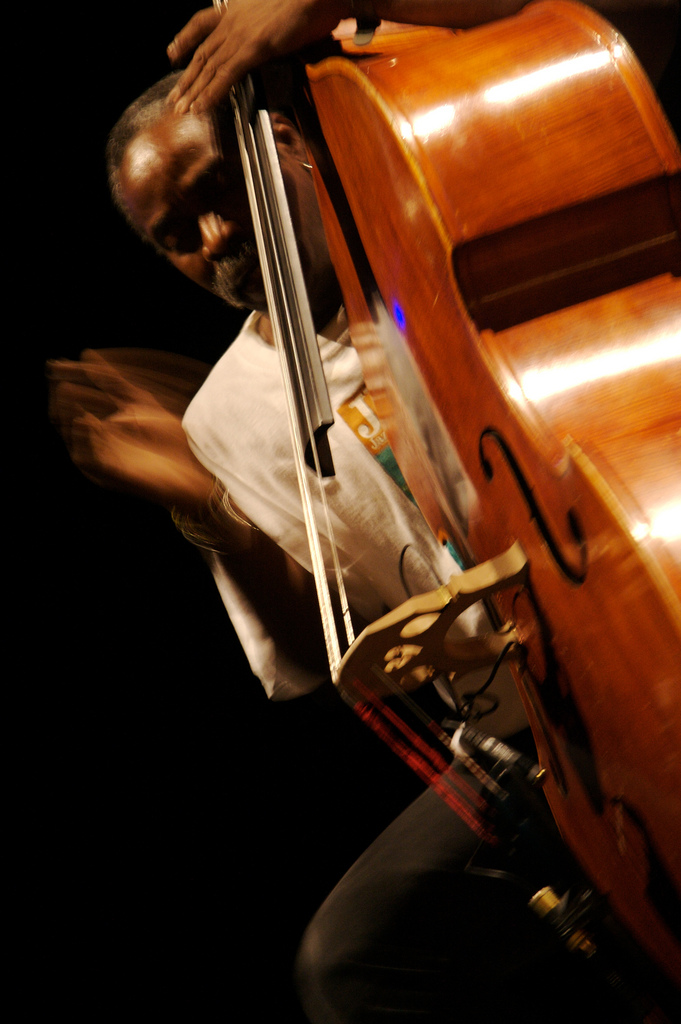
Blake playing

=== As leader ===
- Especially for You (Denon, 1979)
- Now Is the Time: Live at the Knitting Factory (Bubble Core, 2000)

=== As sideman ===
With Billy Cobham

- Total Eclipse (Atlantic, 1974)
- A Funky Thide of Sings (Atlantic, 1975)
- Shabazz (Atlantic, 1975)

With The Manhattan Transfer

- Bodies and Souls (Atlantic, 1983)
- Bop Doo-Wopp (Atlantic, 1984)
- Vocalese (Atlantic, 1985)
- Live (Atlantic, 1987)
- The Offbeat of Avenues (Columbia, 1991)
- Man-Tora! Live in Tokyo (Rhino, 1996)

With Pharoah Sanders

- Love Will Find a Way (Arista, 1978)
- Beyond a Dream with Norman Connors (Arista Novus, 1981)
- Save Our Children (Verve, 1998)

With Sun Ra

- It's After the End of the World (MPS/BASF, 1971)
- My Brother the Wind Vol II (El Saturn, 1971)
- Newport Jazz Festival the Electric Circus (Transparency, 2009)
- Live in London (Transparency, 2010)
- Live at the Red Garter (Transparency, 2013)
- In the Orbit of Ra (Strut/Art Yard, 2014)
- The Intergalactic Thing (Roaratorio, 2016)

With Kazumi Watanabe

- Lonesome Cat (Denon, 1978)
- Village in Bubbles (Better Days, 1978)
- The Best Performance (Better Days, 1982)

With Randy Weston

- African Sunrise (Antilles, 1992)
- Saga (Verve/Gitanes, 1995)
- Khepera (Verve, 1998)
- The Spirits of Our Ancestors (Verve, 1992)
- Spirit! The Power of Music (Gitanes, 2000)
- Live in St. Lucia (Image, 2003)
- Zep Tepi (Random Chance, 2006)
- The Storyteller (Motema, 2010)

With others

- Ahmed Abdullah, Dedication (CIMP, 1998)
- Ahmed Abdullah, Tara's Song (TUM, 2005)
- Jimmy Buffett, Hot Water (MCA, 1988)
- Jonathan Butler, Head to Head (Mercury, 1993)
- Chico Freeman, Sweet Explosion (In+Out 1990)
- Carlos Garnett, Black Love (Muse, 1974)
- Stan Getz, The Final Concert Recording (Eagle, 2000)
- Mac Gollehon, Smokin' Live (McKenzie, 1997)
- Mac Gollehon, La Fama (American Showplace, 2012)
- Weldon Irvine, Time Capsule (Nodlew Music, 1973)
- Weldon Irvine, In Harmony (Strata-East, 1974)
- Oran "Juice" Jones, Player's Call (Tommy Boy, 1997)
- Ryo Kawasaki, Ring Toss (Chiaroscuro, 1977)
- Ryo Kawasaki, Nature's Revenge (MPS, 1978)
- Earl Klugh, Whispers and Promises (Warner Bros., 1989)
- The Last Poets, Delights of the Garden (Douglas, 1977)
- Yusef Lateef, Autophysiopsychic (CTI, 1977)
- Babatunde Lea, March of the Jazz Guerrillas (Ubiquity, 2000)
- Frank Lowe, The Flam (Black Saint, 1976)
- Carmen Lundy, Night and Day (CBS/Sony, 1987)
- Arif Mardin, Journey (Atlantic, 1974)
- Brownie McGhee, Blues Is Truth (Blue Labor, 1976)
- Brownie McGhee, Rainy Day (Tomato, 1989)
- Airto Moreira, Virgin Land (Salvation, 1974)
- Don Pullen, Capricorn Rising (Black Saint, 1976)
- Don Pullen, Tomorrow's Promises (Atlantic, 1977)
- Sonny Rollins, The Way I Feel (Milestone, 1976)
- Dom Um Romao, Saudades (Water Lily Acoustics, 1993)
- Charles "Bobo" Shaw, Concere Ntasiah (Universal Justice 1978)
- Janis Siegel, At Home (Atlantic, 1987)
- Charles Sullivan, Genesis (Strata-East, 1974)
- Ximo Tebar, Steps (Omix, 2008)
- Lenny White, The Adventures of Astral Pirates (Elektra, 1978)
