= Bop Doo-Wopp =

Live album / studio album by The Manhattan Transfer
- Released: December 1984
- Recorded: November 1983 (live); December 1983 (studio); October 1984 (studio)
- Venues: Nakano Sunplaza Hall, Tokyo; Symphony Hall, Boston
- Studios: Studio 55, LA, CA; Paradise Studios, Sydney, Australia
- Genre: Jazz
- Length: 28:52
- Label: Atlantic
- Producers: Tim Hauser, Richard Perry

The Manhattan Transfer chronology
Bodies and Souls (1983)	Bop Doo-Wopp (1984)	Vocalese (1985)

Bop Doo-Wopp is an album by the Manhattan Transfer, released at the end of 1984 on the Atlantic Records label. Six of the ten tracks on Bop Doo-Wopp are live performances.

The album contains the song "Route 66," which originally appeared on the soundtrack of the Burt Reynolds film Sharky's Machine.

The album is essentially a live album (6 tracks) with some additional studio cuts (4 tracks). Five tracks were recorded live at the Nakano Sun Plaza in Japan in November 1983. Songs from these concerts were also released in 1996 on their album Man-Tora! Live in Tokyo. The other live cut, "Duke of Dubuque", was recorded for the Evening at Pops series on PBS. The song "Safronia B" was recorded in Sydney, Australia in December 1983. The other three songs were recorded in New York City.

== Charts ==
This album spawned another Billboard Hot 100 single in "Baby Come Back to Me (The Morse Code of Love)" which reached #83 on the chart in February 1985. The song was dedicated to the Capris (an Italian vocal group from Queens) who wrote and recorded it in 1982, and whose single "There's a Moon Out Tonight" was a top 10 hit in 1961.

== Awards ==
"Route 66" hit the Billboard Hot 100 in 1982, reaching #78, and earned the group another Grammy Award in the category of "Best Jazz Vocal Performance, Duo or Group."

== Track listing ==
CD
No.	Title	Writer(s)	Length
1.	"Route 66" (live)	Bobby Troup	3:20
2.	"Jeannine" (live)	Duke Pearson; Oscar Brown, Jr.	5:30
3.	"My Cat Fell in the Well (Well! Well! Well!)"	Billy Moll; Terry Shand; Dave Roberson	2:45
4.	"The Duke of Dubuque" (live)	James Marchant; Billy Faber; Lawrence Royal	2:20
5.	"How High the Moon" (live)	Nancy Hamilton; Morgan Lewis	1:58
6.	"Baby Come Back to Me (The Morse Code of Love)"	Nick Santamaria	2:52
7.	"Safronia B"	Calvin Boze	2:08
8.	"Heart's Desire" (live)	George Cox; James Dozier; Hugh X. Lewis; Bernard Purdie	2:40
9.	"That's The Way It Goes" (live)	Raoul Cita; George Goldner	2:49
10.	"Unchained Melody"	Alex North; Hy Zaret	2:30
Total length:			28:52

== Personnel ==
The Manhattan Transfer

- Cheryl Bentyne – vocals, vocal arrangements (6, 10)
- Tim Hauser – vocals, musical arrangements (1), vocal arrangements (6, 8–10)
- Alan Paul – vocals, vocal arrangements (6, 10)
- Janis Siegel – vocals, musical arrangements (1), vocal arrangements (3–6, 10)

Musicians

- Yaron Gershovsky – keyboards, conductor, musical arrangements (2, 5–7, 9–10)
- Jon Mayer – acoustic piano
- Tom Kellock – synthesizers
- Ira Newborn – guitars, musical arrangements (3, 8)
- Wayne Johnson – guitars, musical arrangements (4)
- Alex Blake – bass
- Andy Muson – bass
- Jim Nelson – drums
- Art Rodriguez – drums, additional backing vocals (7)
- Don Roberts – woodwinds, additional backing vocals (7)
- Al Capps – vocal arrangements (1)
- Richard Cole – vocal arrangements (2)
- Phil Mattson – vocal arrangements (2)
- John Cutcliffe – additional backing vocals (7)

Production

- Producers – Tim Hauser (Tracks 1, 2, 4–10); Richard Perry and Tim Hauser (Track 3).
- Management – Brian Avnet
- Tracking and Remix – Elliot Scheiner
- Engineers – Howard Steele (Track 3) and Richard Lush (Track 7).
- Second engineers (Track 7) – Glen Holguin and Richard Muecke.
- Tracking engineer (Tracks 1, 2, 5, 8–9) – Kenichi Matsuda
- Monitor engineer (Tracks 1, 2, 5, 8–9) – Pete Winer
- House engineer (Tracks 1, 2, 5, 8–9) – Dan Kasting
- Mastered by Bernie Grundman at A&M Studios (Los Angeles, CA).
- Art direction – Bob Defrin
- Cover Illustration – Leslie Cabarga
