= Brasil (The Manhattan Transfer album) =

Studio album by The Manhattan Transfer
- Released: November 1987
- Studio: Ocean Way Studios, Studio 55, JHL Studios, Bill Schnee Studio,Grey Room, Skip Saylor Recording, LA, CA, Som Livre Studios, Rio de Janeiro, Brazil.
- Genre: Adult contemporary, Latin pop, Smooth jazz
- Length: 41:12
- Label: Atlantic
- Producer: Tim Hauser

The Manhattan Transfer chronology
Live (1987)	Brasil (1987)	The Offbeat of Avenues (1991)

Professional ratings
Review scores
Source	Rating
New Musical Express	5/10

Brasil was The Manhattan Transfer's tenth studio album. It was released in 1987 on Atlantic Records.

This album was a new foray for the group into Brazilian music. During the recording sessions, they worked with many songwriters, including Ivan Lins, Milton Nascimento, Djavan and Atlantic Records Jazz recording artist Gilberto Gil. After the initial recording sessions, the songs were re-arranged and then fitted with English lyrics.

== Awards ==
This album won the Grammy Award for Best Pop Performance by a Duo or Group With Vocals.

== Charts ==
The song "Soul Food To Go" reached #25 on Billboard Magazine's Top Adult Contemporary chart. The stop-motion animated music video for "Soul Food To Go" was produced by Will Vinton Studios.

== Track listing ==
CD
No.	Title	Writer(s)	Length
1.	"Soul Food to Go"	Djavan, Doug Fieger	5:08
2.	"The Zoo Blues"	Djavan, Fieger	3:55
3.	"So You Say"	Djavan, Amanda McBroom	4:47
4.	"Capim"	Djavan	4:58
5.	"Metropolis"	Ivan Lins, Vítor Martins, Brock Walsh	4:15
6.	"Hear the Voices"	Gilberto Gil, Tracy Mann	4:06
7.	"Agua"	Djavan, Walsh	5:08
8.	"The Jungle Pioneer"	Márcio Borges, Milton Nascimento, Walsh	3:30
9.	"Notes from the Underground"	Lins, Martins, Walsh	5:45
Total length:			41:12

== Personnel ==
The Manhattan Transfer

- Janis Siegel – vocals, vocal arrangements (1, 3–4, 6–9)
- Alan Paul – vocals, vocal arrangements (2, 4–5)
- Cheryl Bentyne – vocals, vocal arrangements (3)
- Tim Hauser – vocals

Musicians and Guests

- Larry Williams – keyboards (4, 6–7, 9), synthesizer programming (4, 6–7, 9), arrangements (4, 6–7, 9)
- Jeff Lorber – keyboards (1–3, 5), synthesizer programming (1–3, 5), arrangements (1–3, 5)
- John Robinson – drums (3–4, 7–8)
- Paulinho da Costa – percussion (2, 4–5, 9)
- Toninho Horta – guitar (4, 6, 8)
- Djavan – guest vocals (1, 4)
- Wayne Johnson – guitar (1, 5)
- Djalma Corrêa – percussion (1, 6)
- Dann Huff – guitar (3, 7)
- Abraham Laboriel – bass (4, 6)
- Oscar Castro-Neves – guitar (4, 9)
- Nathan East – bass (5, 7)
- Uakti (Paulo Sergio Dos Santos, Marco Antonio Guimaraes, Decio De Souza Ramos and Artur Andres Riberto) – soloists (7, 9); Arranged by Marco Antonio Guimaraes
- Buddy Williams – drums (1)
- David Sanborn – alto saxophone solo (3)
- Stan Getz – tenor saxophone solo (4)
- Yaron Gershovsky – acoustic piano (5)
- Frank Colón – percussion (8)
- Jamal Joanes Dos Santos – bass (8)
- Victor Biglione – guitar (8)
- Wagner Tiso – synthesizer programming (8), arrangements (8)
- Milton Nascimento – guest vocals (8)

Production

- Producers – Tim Hauser (Tracks 1–7 & 9); Tim Hauser and Mazzola (Track 8).
- Executive producer on Brazilian sessions – Alberto Traiger
- Recorded by Ed Thacker
- Second engineers – Carlos Ronconi and Mike Ross
- Vocal engineer – Keith Cohen
- Second vocal engineer – Ted Blaisdell
- Mixed by Brian Malouf
- Second mixing engineers – Jim Dineen and Clif Jones
- Recorded at Ocean Way Studios, Studio 55 and Skip Saylor Recording (Los Angeles, CA); Bill Schnee Studios and The Grey Room (Hollywood, CA); JHL Studios (Pacific Palisades, CA); Som Livre Studios (Rio de Janeiro, Brazil).
- Mastered by Stephen Marcussen at Precision Mastering (Hollywood, CA).
- Album coordination – Marsha Loeb
- Project coordination – Ivy Skoff
- Art direction, design and paintings – Fayette Hauser
- Back cover photography – Lawrence Manning
- Sleeve photography – Nancy Clendaniel, John Cutcliffe, Fayette Hauser, Tim Hauser, Lawrence Manning and Louise Velasquez.

== Certifications ==
Region	Certification	Certified units/sales
Spain (PROMUSICAE)	Gold	50,000^{^}
^{^} Shipments figures based on certification alone.

== References / Sources ==
- The Manhattan Transfer Official Website

Specific
