= Couldn't Be Hotter =

Live album by The Manhattan Transfer
- Released: September 2003
- Recorded: December 2000
- Genre: Vocal jazz
- Length: 77:32
- Label: Telarc
- Producer: Tim Hauser

The Manhattan Transfer chronology
The Spirit of St. Louis (2000)	Couldn't Be Hotter (2003)	Vibrate (2004)

Couldn't Be Hotter is the fifth live album released by The Manhattan Transfer in 2003 on the Telarc label. This is their third live album with Cheryl Bentyne. It was recorded during a tour of Japan over two nights at Orchestra Hall in Tokyo.

== Reviews ==
- "The Transfer's first live recording in seven years. And, yes, after more than two decades in existence, they're still pretty hot."

-- Los Angeles Times

- "A great live set by the vocal quartet who specialize in jazz vocalese, still harmonizing strongly with 30-plus years under their belts."

-- Goldmine

- "This impressive set shows that the Transfer is still at the peak of their collective powers...it's time we acknowledged them as one of the very best of a dying breed, THE classic vocal group. This CD is proof positive "Couldn't Be Hotter" indeed."

-- JazzReview.com

- "Recorded in Japan, Couldn't Be Hotter fully displays the humor and soaring interplay of Hauser, Siegel, Paul, and Bentyne as they re-establish themselves as the premiere vocal quartet."

-- Rhythm & News

== Track listing ==
#	Song title	Composer/songwriter	length
1	"Old Man Mose"	Louis Armstrong, Zilner Randolph	2:46
2	"Sing Moten's Swing"	Jon Hendricks, Bennie Moten, Ira Moten	3:42
3	"A-Tisket, A-Tasket"	Van Alexander, Ella Fitzgerald	3:06
4	"Sugar"	Sidney D. Mitchell, Edna Pinkard, Maceo Pinkard	3:41
5	"(Up A) Lazy River"	Sidney Arodin, Hoagy Carmichael	5:38
6	"Do You Know What It Means to Miss New Orleans?"	Louis Alter, Eddie DeLange	5:32
7	"Stars Fell on Alabama"	Mitchell Parish, Frank Perkins	4:32
8	"Gone Fishin'"	Nick Kenny, Charles Kenny	5:03
9	"Blue Again"	Dorothy Fields, Jimmy McHugh	5:29
10	"Clouds"	Jon Hendricks, Django Reinhardt	7:51
11	"Stompin' at Mahogany Hall"	Alan Paul, Spencer Williams	3:08
12	"Nothing Could Be Hotter Than That"	Lillian Armstrong	6:43
13	"It's Good Enough to Keep (Air Mail Special)"	Charlie Christian, Benny Goodman, Jimmy Mundy, Alan Paul	3:14
14	"Don't Let Go"	Jesse Stone	4:18
15	"Twilight Zone/Twilight Tone"	Jay Graydon, Bernard Herrmann, Alan Paul	4:15
16	"My Foolish Heart"	Ned Washington, Victor Young	8:25

== Personnel ==
The Manhattan Transfer

- Cheryl Bentyne – vocals
- Tim Hauser – vocals
- Alan Paul – vocals
- Janis Siegel – vocals

Musicians

- Yaron Gershovsky – keyboards, arrangements, musical director
- Wayne Johnson – guitars
- Michael Bowie – bass
- Tom Brechtlein – drums
- Larry Klimas – soprano saxophone, tenor saxophone
- Lew Soloff – trumpet

Production

- Tim Hauser – producer
- Katsu Kusakabe – producer, management director
- Rick Garcia – production coordinator
- Kevin Sproatt – engineer
- Michael Eric Hutchinson – mixing
- Robert Hadley – mastering
- Anilda Carrasquillo – art direction, design
- Robert Hoffman – photography
- Nicholas Jeen – tour manager
