= Jukin' =

Studio album by The Manhattan Transfer
- Released: 1971
- Recorded: 1969–1971
- Genre: Vocal jazz
- Label: Capitol
- Producer: Adam Mitchell

The Manhattan Transfer chronology
| Jukin' (1971) | The Manhattan Transfer (1975) |

Professional ratings
Review scores
| Source | Rating |
|---|---|
| AllMusic | 2/5 stars |

Jukin' is the debut album by the Manhattan Transfer. Released on Capitol Records in 1971, it was also the only album by the first version of the group, which consisted of Tim Hauser, Erin Dickins, Marty Nelson, Gene Pistilli, and Pat Rosalia.

The album was reissued in the UK by EMI's Music for Pleasure under the title The Manhattan Transfer and Gene Pistilli. Pistilli was known for collaborations with Terry Cashman and Tommy West.

The first group lasted about two years. According to Tim Hauser, "Gene and I were in two different places. He was more into country and western, R&B, and the Memphis sound, and by then I'd become more interested in jazz and swing." This version of the Manhattan Transfer broke up shortly after this album was released, and Tim Hauser formed a new version of the group during October 1972. The revised Manhattan Transfer line-up (Tim Hauser, Laurel Massé, Alan Paul and Janis Siegel) signed to Atlantic Records in 1975 and resumed the group's recording career with much greater success.

Jukin' remained an orphan in the Manhattan Transfer's catalogue. Issued on a different label than their future successes, with a different line-up and sound from what became their trademark, Jukin' is not acknowledged on the band's official website, nor have any of its tracks been anthologized on compilations. The revised group re-recorded the track "Java Jive" on the group's next album. It is the re-recorded version, not the version found on Jukin' , that can be found on multiple compilation albums.

The album has been reissued with a variety of covers. A European reissue was entitled A Touch of Class and featured misleading packaging and credits that wrongly implied that the songs were performed by the later (post–1972) version of The Manhattan Transfer.

== Track listing ==
| # | Song title | Composer/songwriter | length |
|---|---|---|---|
| 1 | "Chicken Bone Bone" | Bobby McKinnon, Gene Pistilli | 3:20 |
| 2 | "I Need a Man" | Tom Anthony, Gene Pistilli | 3:12 |
| 3 | "You'se a Viper" | Anne Rachel, Fats Waller | 1:59 |
| 4 | "Fair and Tender Ladies" | A.P. Carter | 2:41 |
| 5 | "Rosianna" | Terry Cashman, Gene Pistilli, Tommy West | 3:03 |
| 6 | "Sunny Disposish" | Philip Charig, Ira Gershwin | 1:41 |
| 7 | "Java Jive" | Milton Drake, Ben Oakland | 2:34 |
| 8 | "One More Time Around Rosie" | Geoff Gutcheon, Gene Pistilli | 4:20 |
| 9 | "Guided Missiles" | Alfred Gaitwood, Dootsie Williams | 3:25 |
| 10 | "Roll Daddy, Roll" | Gene Pistilli, Garry Sherman | 2:21 |
