= Frank Colón =

American musician (born 1951)

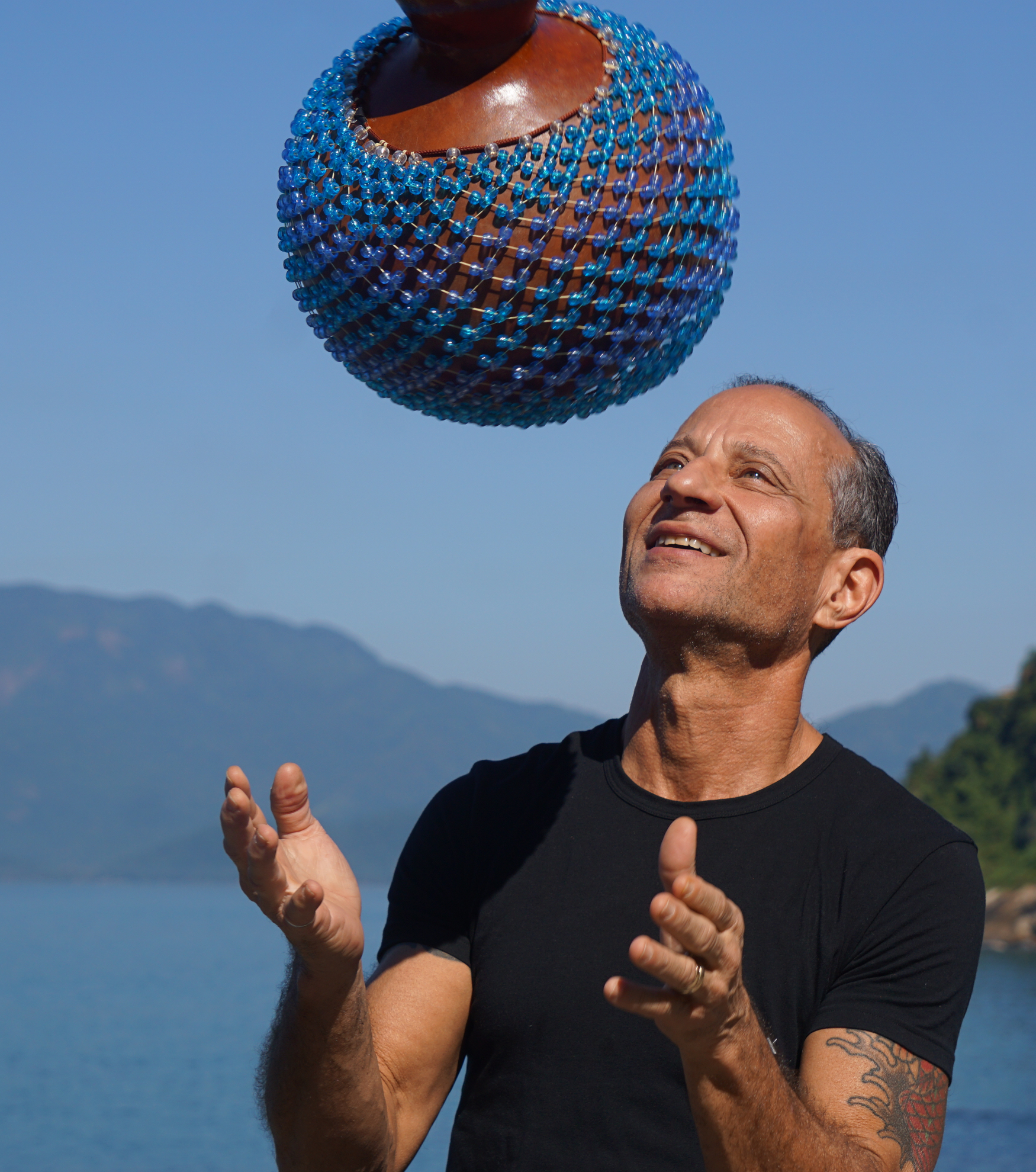

Background information
- Born: October 13, 1951 (age 74); Washington, D.C., U.S.
- Genres: Jazz, jazz fusion, Latin jazz, world music
- Occupation: Musician
- Instrument: Percussion/Composer
- Years active: 1960s–present
- Website: www.frankcolonpercussion.com

Frank Colón (born October 13, 1951) is an American musician and martial artist of Puerto Rican descent.

== Early life and education ==
Born in Washington, D.C., Colón moved from there to Puerto Rico at the age of five. His musical instruction began at age eleven, beginning with classical piano lessons, under the guidance of Angelina Figueroa and Rafael Figueroa. He also studied Brazilian percussion, guitar, electric bass, and trap drums. He was active in municipal and collegiate sports, martial arts, and amateur theater, and worked with various local pop music groups.

In 1970, he moved back to Washington, D.C. to attend college at American University, where he majored in Political Science. During this time, his musical orientation changed from melodic instruments to percussion. Finishing his university requirements, he turned full-time to music.

== Music career ==
In 1976, Colón moved to New York City to work with the drummer Julito Collazo. There he became proficient at playing the Batá drums.

== Martial arts ==
Colón is a practitioner of Tai chi, and an American pioneer black belt senior instructor in the Israeli self-defense system Krav-Maga, certified by the Wingate Institute of Israel and Krav-Maga International, Inc. He was the first elected vice-president of the American Association of Krav maga Instructors (AAKMI), nowadays known as The Krav maga Federation. He currently holds the rank of Professor Black Belt Dan 2.

== Discography ==
=== As leader ===
- Live at Vartanjazz
- Latin Wonder
- Latin Lounge

=== As sideman ===
With Ray Anderson

- Don't Mow Your Lawn (Enja, 1994)

With Gato Barbieri

- Bahia (Fania, 1982)

With Mary J. Blige

- My Life (Verve, 1994)

With George Clinton

- By Way of the Drum (Hip-O Select, 2007)

With David Bennett Cohen

- Cookin' With Cohen (Core, 2008)

With Barbara Dennerlein

- Junkanoo (Verve, 1997)

With Charles Earland

- Front Burner (Milestone, 1988)

With Michael Galasso

- High Lines (ECM, 2005)

With Diem Jones

- Equanimity (Dr. Woo, 2007)

With Babatunde Lea

- Level of Intent (Motema Music, 1991)

With Tom Lellis

- Southern Exposure (Adventure, 2003)

With Andrea Marcelli

- Oneness (Lipstick, 1994)

With Tania Maria

- The Real Tania Maria: WILD! (Concord, 1985)
- Outrageously Wild! (Concord, 1993)
- Heads and Tales (Enja, 1995)

With Airto Moreira

- Aquí Se Puede (Montuno, 1986)
- Samba De Flora (Montuno, 1988)
- The Other Side of This (Rykodisc, 1992)

With Milton Nascimento

- Missa Dos Quilombos (Ariola, 1982)
- Anima (Ariola, 1983)
- Ao Vivo em Montreux (Ariola, 1983)

With Ivo Perelman

- Children of Ibeji (Enja, 1991)

With Michel Petrucciani

- Music (Blue Note, 1989)
- The Blue Note Years (Blue Note, 1994)

With John R. Pollard

- Passion, Poison, and Politik (PPP, 2002)

With Jennifer Richman

- Flowers of Gold (MarcusW, 2006)

With Steve Sacks

- Primeiro Sonho (AMJ, 1999)

With Wayne Shorter

- Joy Ryder (Columbia, 1988)

With Janis Siegel

- The Tender Trap (Medici, 1999)
- I Wish You Love (Telarc, 2002)

With Bob Stewart

- Goin' Home (Verve, 2003)

With Robertinho Silva

- Speak No Evil (Ariola, 1995)
- Bodas De Prata (Gismonti, 1989)

With Tana/Reid

- Blue Motion (Evidence, 1994)

With Towa Tei

- Future Listening! (Elektra, 1995)

With Cecilia Tenconi

- Tiger Lily (Cecitenco, 2007)

With Wagner Tiso

- Ao Vivo em Montreux (Ariola, 1983)

With The Manhattan Transfer

- Brasil (Atlantic, 1987)
- The Offbeat of Avenues (Atlantic, 1991)
- Vibrate (Telarc, 2004)

With Ernie Watts & Gilberto Gil

- Afoxé (CTI, 1991)

With Michael Wolff

- Intoxicate (Indianola, 2001)
- Impure Thoughts (Razor & Tie, 2000)
- Sexual Healing (Roving Spirits, 2002)

== Filmography ==
Colón appeared on an HBO television special with Harry Belafonte, titled "Don't Stop the Music", taped in Winnipeg, Canada; a Disney Channel Special with The Manhattan Transfer, titled, "Going Home"; a TV special with Tania Maria for the "Ohne Filter" show, out of Baden-Baden, Germany; a Brazil TVE special with Milton Nascimento "Live in Montreux"; two appearances on The Tonight Show with The Manhattan Transfer – one with Johnny Carson and the other with Jay Leno; a special on WIPR-TV in Puerto Rico, featured with Tania Maria, performing in the Heineken Jazz Festival; an HBO broadcast of the 40th Anniversary of Atlantic Records, in Madison Square Garden; an appearance on the Good Morning America show (ABC TV) with The Manhattan Transfer, and various other appearances performing with his own band throughout Russia, Uzbekistan, Kyrgyzstan, Georgia and Moldova.

He also appeared in the film Calle 54 by director Fernando Trueba.
