= Now Is the Time: Live at the Knitting Factory =

Live album by The Alex Blake Quintet Featuring Pharoah Sanders
- Released: 2000
- Recorded: December 6, 1999
- Venue: Knitting Factory, New York City
- Genre: Jazz
- Length: 54:05
- Label: Bubble Core bc-030
- Producer: Andrew Choate, Bruno Johnson, John Corbett

Alex Blake chronology
Especially for You (1979)	Now Is the Time: Live at the Knitting Factory (2000)

Now Is the Time: Live at the Knitting Factory is a live album by bassist Alex Blake. It was recorded on December 6, 1999, at the Knitting Factory in New York City, and was released in 2000 by Bubble Core Music. On the album, Blake is joined by guest artist Pharoah Sanders on tenor saxophone, along with a group featuring alto saxophonist Chris Hunter, pianist John Hicks, drummer Victor Jones, and percussionist Neil Clark.

In an interview, Blake listed Richard Davis, Jimmy Garrison, and Reggie Workman as influences on his bass playing, and described his unique approach to the instrument as "like having a guitar and congas and putting them together with the bass. It's a construct of strumming and playing the congas; that's the percussive side of my playing."

== Reception ==
Professional ratings
Review scores
Source	Rating
AllMusic	3/5 stars

In a review for AllMusic, Ken Taylor called the album "an incredibly joyous record that doesn't seem steeped in trying to bring about any great meaning," and wrote: "the musicianship is paramount and unmatched on any late-'90s jazz recordings."

Mark Corroto of All About Jazz stated: "This recording is Blake's first domestic release as a leader. But leading is not a central element of this date. His sidemen are featured prominently, as the enthusiastic audience encourages the revelry." He concluded: "Note to wish list: record this band again, make it a two-CD (maybe three) affair and stretch out the solos." Another AAJ reviewer remarked: "Blake's quintet recalls the energy and fluidity of '60s jazz. It dwells largely within fixed harmonic constraints, but toys endlessly with the possibilities available to soloists... Don't go into Now without an open ear for surprise and humor—these are serious musicians, but they aren't afraid to play around a bit."

Writing for JazzTimes, Christopher Porter singled out "Little Help Solo" for praise, commenting: "Blake demonstrates his full arsenal of percussive techniques and lyrical lines... His bass playing sounds like an a cappella jazz singer improvising on the melody."

In an article for the Chicago Reader, Peter Margasak wrote: "from the lightning-fast 'On the Spot,' which cops a melody from Coltrane's 'Giant Steps,' to the earthy Weston-flavored blues of 'The Chief,' it's... a solid set of nicely nuanced hard bop."

== Track listing ==
1. "On the Spot" (Alex Blake) – 11:48
2. "Intro - Neil Clark" (Alex Blake) – 2:53
3. "The Chief" (Alex Blake) – Alex Blake
4. "Little Help Solo" (Lennon–McCartney) – 6:03
5. "Intro - Alex Blake" (Alex Blake) – 1:27
6. "Now Is the Time" (Alex Blake) – 9:52
7. "Mystery of Love" (Guy Warren) – 9:18

== Personnel ==
- Alex Blake – acoustic bass, electric bass, percussion, vocals
- Pharoah Sanders – tenor saxophone
- Chris Hunter – alto saxophone
- John Hicks – piano
- Victor Jones – drums
- Neil Clark – percussion
