= High Lines =

Studio album by Michael Galasso
- Released: 2005
- Recorded: November 2002 and April 2004
- Studio: Rainbow Studio; Oslo, Norway
- Genre: Jazz
- Length: 50:16
- Label: ECM; ECM 1713
- Producer: Manfred Eicher

Michael Galasso chronology
Scan Lines (1984)	High Lines (2005)

High Lines is an album by American composer and violinist Michael Galasso recorded in November 2002 and April 2004 and released on ECM the following year. The quartet features rhythm section Terje Rypdal, Marc Marder and Frank Colón.

== Reception ==
Professional ratings
Review scores
Source	Rating
AllMusic	3.5/5 stars

The AllMusic review by Richard S. Ginell awarded the album 3½ stars stating "At times, the album resembles a Glass soundtrack, but Galasso is not as predictable as Glass, freely roaming around various world cultures for inspiration, varying his bowing techniques to suit the mood... It's hard to predict how these mostly slight compositions will stand up to repeated listening, but they are beautifully recorded in the best ECM fashion."

== Track listing ==
All compositions by Michael Galasso

1. "Spheric" – 4:44
2. "Caravanserai Day" – 1:48
3. "Never More" – 0:44
4. "The Other" – 6:10
5. "Gothic Beach" – 3:15
6. "Quarantine" – 2:47
7. "Crossing Colors" – 3:30
8. "Chaconne" – 3:18
9. "Boreal" – 2:04
10. "High Lines" – 1:50
11. "Caravanserai Night" – 1:16
12. "Swan Pond" – 2:24
13. "Iranian Dream" – 2:16
14. "Fog and After" – 6:09
15. "Somnambulist" – 2:56
16. "Gorge Green" – 5:28

== Personnel ==
- Michael Galasso – violin
- Terje Rypdal – guitar
- Marc Marder – double bass
- Frank Colón – percussion
