= Wayne Johnson (musician) =

American jazz guitarist

- Born: November 11, 1949 (age 75)
- Genres: Soul jazz, jazz fusion
- Occupation: Musician
- Instrument: Guitar
- Years active: 1970s – present
- Labels: Solid Air

Wayne Johnson is an American jazz electric and acoustic guitarist who won a Grammy Award in 2004 for his contribution to the album Pink Guitar, which featured the songs of composer Henry Mancini.

Johnson attended Boston's Berklee College of Music in the late 1970s and soon after worked as a studio musician, touring with the Manhattan Transfer. He has recorded most often in a trio with bassist Jimmy Johnson and drummer Bill Berg, who were founding members of the group Flim & the BB's. He has been the guitarist for Bette Midler at Caesar's Palace in Las Vegas.

Johnson has performed with Rickie Lee Jones, Elton John, John Tesh, Akiko Yano, and Lee Oskar. He is a music educator and serves as a clinician for Taylor Guitars.

== Discography ==
=== As leader ===
- Arrowhead (Inner City, 1980)
- Grasshopper (ITI, 1983)
- Everybody's Painting Pictures (Zebra, 1984)
- Spirit of the Dancer (Zebra, 1988)
- Keeping the Dream Alive (MoJazz, 1993)
- Kindred Spirits (GTSP, 1996)
- Apache with Jeff Richman (Miramar, 1999)
- One Guitar (Solid Air, 2003)
- The Distance with Jeff Richman (Warrant Music, 2014)

=== As sideman ===
With The Manhattan Transfer

- The Manhattan Transfer Live (Atlantic, 1978)
- Bop Doo-Wopp (Atlantic, 1985)
- Brasil (Atlantic, 1987)
- Couldn't Be Hotter (Telarc, 2003)
