= Laurel Massé =

American jazz singer (born 1951)

- Birth name: Laurel Anne Massé
- Born: December 29, 1951 (age 73); Holland, Michigan, U.S.
- Genres: Vocal jazz, pop, classical, vocal
- Occupation(s): Singer, educator
- Instrument: Vocals
- Years active: 1972–present
- Labels: Pausa
- Website: www.laurelmasse.com

Laurel Massé (born December 29, 1951) is an American jazz singer and former member of The Manhattan Transfer.

== Career ==
Massé was born in Holland, Michigan, grew up in Westchester County, New York, and lived in Europe during her teens. Early in school, she developed a fondness for classical music, particularly Beethoven, though she also cites the Beatles, Pablo Casals, and her grandfather as influences. Her grandfather sang with Fred Waring's Pennsylvanians, and her mother sang opera. Massé started on piano, played cello in her teens, and was her own teacher on guitar during the 1960s. She sang in the choir and belonged to rock bands in high school. When she was very young, her parents took her to see Count Basie as a birthday present, but Massé was otherwise unfamiliar with jazz until the age of 20.

In 1972, Massé was working as a waitress in New York City when she stepped into a taxi driven by Tim Hauser. Massé and Hauser had the same ambition to be singers. Hauser had formed a vocal group, the Manhattan Transfer, which broke up after recording one album. Some weeks later, one of Hauser's passengers took him to a party where he met Janis Siegel, another aspiring singer. Then he was introduced to Alan Paul, and the quartet was complete. Massé's background in multiple genres fit the Manhattan Transfer's repertoire of jazzy pop, rock, and swing.

With the Manhattan Transfer, Massé toured worldwide, appeared on TV, and sold millions of albums until a car accident in 1979. Unhappy with life in the group, she considered the accident a providential opportunity to start a solo career. In 1981, she moved to Chicago, and with the help of Judy Roberts, a singer and pianist, she returned to singing in clubs. She recorded her first solo album, Alone Together (Pausa, 1984), and toured in the U.S. and Canada.

During the 1990s, Massé lived in North Creek, New York in the Adirondack Mountains, concentrating on classical and Celtic music. In 1997, she started teaching at the Ashokan Music and Dance Camp, and in 2004 at the International Cabaret Conference at Yale University. She has also taught at Dartmouth College and the Royal Academy of Music in England. She has been a soloist and member of the choir of the Cathedral of St. John the Divine in New York.

== Awards ==
- MAC Lifetime Achievement Award, 2004
- Bistro Best Jazz Vocalist, 2009

== Discography ==
- Alone Together (Pausa, 1984)
- Easy Living (Pausa, 1986)
- Again (Disques Beaupré, 1990)
- Feather & Bone (Premonition, 2001)
- That Old Mercer Magic with Janis Siegel and Lauren Kinhan as Jalala (Dare, 2009)
- Once in a Million Moons with Tex Arnold (2012)

With The Manhattan Transfer

- The Manhattan Transfer (1975)
- Coming Out (1976)
- Pastiche (1977)
- The Manhattan Transfer Live (1978)

With others

- Tim Curry, Simplicity (1981)
- Carol Hall, Hallways: The Songs of Carol Hall, (2008)
- Barry Manilow, Barry Manilow (1973)
- Tim Moore, White Shadows (1977)
- Professor Louie, Flyin' High (2002)
- Layne Redmond, Invoking the Muse (2004)
- Tony Trischka, New Deal (2003)
