= The Manhattan Transfer =

American vocal music group

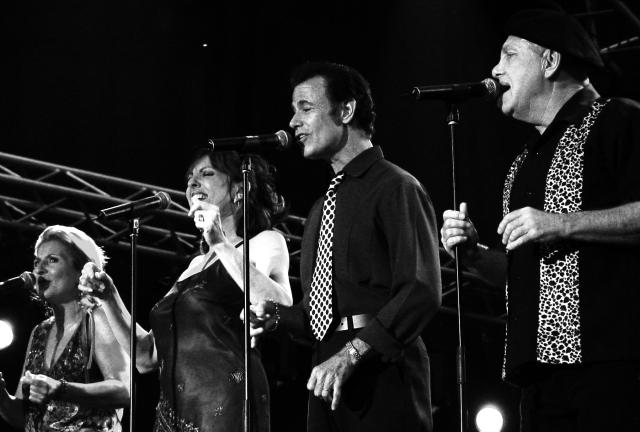
- The classic formation of the Manhattan Transfer from left to right: Janis Siegel, Cheryl Bentyne, Alan Paul, and Tim Hauser

Background information
- Origin: New York City, U.S.
- Genres: A cappella; jazz; swing; vocalese; soul; pop; R&B
- Years active: 1969–2023
- Labels: Capitol; Columbia; Atlantic; Telarc; Rhino
- Past members: Tim Hauser; Erin Dickins; Gene Pistilli; Marty Nelson; Pat Rosalia; Laurel Massé; Janis Siegel; Alan Paul; Cheryl Bentyne; Trist Curless
- Website: manhattantransfer.net

The Manhattan Transfer was an American vocal group founded in 1969 in New York City, performing music genres like jazz, swing, rhythm and blues, pop, and standards. They won eleven Grammy Awards.

There were several incarnations and formations of the Manhattan Transfer, with each rendition having different styles.

The first rendition was in the 1960s, consisting of mostly an acappella-tinged style; it featured Tim Hauser, Erin Dickins, Marty Nelson, Pat Rosalia, and Gene Pistilli. The second version of the group, formed in 1972, incorporating a more vocal jazz approach, consisted of Hauser, Alan Paul, Janis Siegel, and Laurel Massé.

The third, and most commercially perceived, formation of the group happened in 1979, because Massé had to leave the group after being badly injured in a car crash and was replaced by Cheryl Bentyne. This edition of the Manhattan Transfer performed electronic-styled pop, soul, funk, and rhythmic music, having success in the 1980s.

Since the 1990s, the lineup of Hauser, Paul, Siegel, and Bentyne continued, and performed mostly cool and smooth jazz. The group also had several rotating touring members, and longtime pianist Yaron Gershovsky accompanied the group on tour and served as music director. Trist Curless from the Los Angeles a cappella group m-pact became a permanent member in October 2014 following Hauser's death. The group officially retired in 2023.

== Early years ==
In 1969, Tim Hauser formed a vocal group in New York City called The Manhattan Transfer after the novel by John Dos Passos. The group consisted of Hauser, Erin Dickins, Marty Nelson, Pat Rosalia, and Gene Pistilli. This group made one album, Jukin' (Capitol, 1971), which looked at the jazz music of the past as well as rock and country genres unlike the later incarnations of the group. They were not picked up by Capitol Records for a second album, and the group broke up in 1973.

Shortly thereafter, Hauser met Laurel Massé while he was a cab driver and she was his passenger. Soon after, he met Janis Siegel. During this time, session drummer Roy Markowitz, who had played with Janis Joplin and recorded with Don McLean, attended a performance of the group and convinced Tim to change the group's direction. Roy was in the Broadway band of Grease and introduced one of its cast members, Alan Paul (who played the dual role of bandleader Johnny Casino and the Teen Angel), to Tim. Thus began another version of The Manhattan Transfer. After performing in clubs in New York City, the quartet asked Roy to produce a demo to present to Ahmet Ertegun at Atlantic Records. The demo was a success and Atlantic released its debut album with guest appearances by bona fide jazz musicians Randy Brecker, Jon Faddis, and Zoot Sims. The Manhattan Transfer (Atlantic, 1975) featured a re-recorded version of "Java Jive" from the previous album, but was more focused on jazz and swing, presenting a vocalese rendition of "Tuxedo Junction" and scoring a Hot 100 top 25 hit with the gospel-tinged "Operator." During the month of August 1975, the group hosted a four-week variety series on CBS-TV. The hour-long show was simply called The Manhattan Transfer, aired on Sunday evenings, and for the most part concentrated on showcasing the talents of the group. Their next album, Coming Out (1976), produced "Chanson d'Amour," which was a number one hit in the UK and Ireland. The group made two further albums with Massé, Pastiche and The Manhattan Transfer Live (both 1978).

== Bentyne and "Birdland" ==
In 1978, Laurel Massé was in a car crash and dropped out of the group. She was replaced by Cheryl Bentyne. The group's next album, Extensions (Atlantic, 1979), produced the hit "Twilight Zone/Twilight Tone", a song based on the TV series The Twilight Zone (including an impersonation of Rod Serling's narration from Alan Paul).

Extensions featured a cover version of "Birdland", an instrumental by the jazz fusion group Weather Report, with lyrics by Jon Hendricks of Lambert, Hendricks, and Ross. One of the most popular jazz recordings of 1980, "Birdland" won the Grammy Award for Best Jazz Fusion Performance, while Janis Siegel won the Grammy Award for Best Vocal Arrangement.

During the late 1970s, the Manhattan Transfer appeared as performing guest artists on the BBC show The Two Ronnies.

In 1981, the Manhattan Transfer made music history by becoming the first group to win Grammy awards for both popular and jazz categories in the same year. "The Boy from New York City", a cover of the 1965 success by The Ad Libs, reached the Top 10 on the Hot 100 and won them the award for Best Pop Performance by a Duo or Group with Vocal, and "Until I Met You (Corner Pocket)" earned them a Grammy Award for Best Jazz Vocal Performance, Duo or Group. Both of these songs appeared on the group's fifth album, Mecca for Moderns (Atlantic, 1981). In 1982, the group won another Grammy, for Best Jazz Vocal Performance, Duo or Group, for its rendition of "Route 66". The song was featured on the soundtrack to the Burt Reynolds film Sharky's Machine.

== Stretching out ==
In September 1983, the group released the album Bodies and Souls, with an urban-contemporary style which resulted in two R&B chart singles. The first was the No. 2 hit "Spice of Life", which was co-written by former Heatwave member Rod Temperton who had penned several hits for Michael Jackson. The single also reached No. 40 on the US pop chart and No. 19 in the UK. The other single, the ballad "Mystery" (#80 R&B, No. 102 Pop), was later covered by Anita Baker on her 1986 album Rapture.

In 1985, the group released two albums; the first was Bop Doo-Wopp, which included both live and studio recordings, and the second was Vocalese, which received twelve Grammy nominations—at the time making it second only to Michael Jackson's Thriller as the most nominated single album ever. The group won in two categories: Best Jazz Vocal Performance, Duo or Group, and Best Arrangement for Voices. This was followed by a live recording of many of these songs titled Live. This concert, recorded in Japan, was also released on VHS and DVD, later titled Vocalese Live.

For their next album, Brasil (1987), the group headed south to work with Brazilian songwriters and musicians Ivan Lins, Milton Nascimento, Djavan and Gilberto Gil. Brasil won a Grammy for Best Pop Performance by a Duo or Group with Vocal.

The group did not release any studio albums again until 1991, when they signed with the Sony Music label and released The Offbeat of Avenues, featuring original material written or co-written by members of the quartet. Their efforts brought them their 10th Grammy award, for the song "Sassy". This was followed by the release of their first holiday album entitled The Christmas Album in 1992.

Switching back to Atlantic Records as their distributor, they released Tonin' (a collection of R&B and popular successes from the 1960s), The Manhattan Transfer Meets Tubby the Tuba (a children's album), and their 1997 album Swing which covered 1930s-era swing music. Their final album for Atlantic was The Spirit of St. Louis in 2000, dedicated to the music of Louis Armstrong. The group was inducted into the Vocal Group Hall of Fame in 1998.

== Since 2000 ==
The group signed to the Telarc label in 2003 to release Couldn't Be Hotter, a live performance capturing many of the songs from The Spirit of St. Louis. In 2004, the group released Vibrate, another one of their pastich albums, blending original tunes with older ones, pop, jazz and funk. Vibrate featured notable musicians such as bassist Will Lee and Steve Hass on drums. They also released, first in Japan, their second holiday album, An Acapella Christmas, in 2005. The album was released in the U.S. in 2006.

During 2006, the group released The Symphony Sessions, a collection of some of their best-known songs re-recorded with an orchestra, and also The Definitive Pop Collection, a two-disc collection of the group's material from their Atlantic Records period. They also recorded their first original title song for a movie, "Trail of the Screaming Forehead"; and, in late 2006, the group released a new concert DVD, The Christmas Concert, which was broadcast by PBS.

The Chick Corea Songbook, a tribute to the works of that American jazz musician, was released in September 2009. The album features an appearance by Corea himself on the track "Free Samba". Other prominent musicians on this recording are Airto Moreira, Scott Kinsey, Steve Hass, Alex Acuña, Jimmy Earl, John Benitez, and Christian McBride.

In 2011, The Manhattan Transfer worked on an album of previously recorded, but never finished, songs to honor their 40th anniversary. "We are working on a project now that is called The Vaults. Over the years, there are a lot of different songs that we recorded but never finished. We pull out from the archives a lot of these songs and are finishing them," said Alan Paul in an interview for Jazz FM radio in Bulgaria. One of the highlights of the album was a vocalese version of George and Ira Gershwin's "The Man I Love," based on an Artie Shaw and His Orchestra performance of the composition, which had originally been slated for the Swing album.

== Substitutes and fourth line-up ==
Original member Pat Rosalia died from cancer in July 2011.

In 2011, while receiving treatment for Hodgkin's lymphoma, Cheryl Bentyne was replaced on stage for eight months by the soprano Margaret Dorn; Dorn replaced her again December 2013 (followed by Katie Campbell in early 2014) while Bentyne underwent further treatment. Tim Hauser was absent from the stage in 2013 and early 2014 as he recovered from spinal surgery; he was replaced on stage by bass/baritone Trist Curless of the a cappella group m-pact.

In September 2013, one of the original members of the group, Erin Dickins, started a Kickstarter campaign to re-record "Java Jive" with the surviving original members. It featured Tim Hauser's scat musings, as well as a vocal arrangement by Marty Nelson, sung by Dickins, Nelson, Hauser and Gene Pistilli. The project was successfully funded on October 9, 2013, and released on the CD Java Jive on Dot Time Records.

Tim Hauser died of cardiac arrest on October 16, 2014. Following Hauser's death, the group announced Curless would replace him.

Gene Pistilli died on December 26, 2017.

== Retirement and final concert ==
The Manhattan Transfer performed their final concert on December 15, 2023, at the Walt Disney Concert Hall in Los Angeles.

== Awards and honors ==
- 1980 "Birdland", Grammy Award for Best Vocal Arrangement for Two or More Voices, Janis Siegel
- 1980 "Birdland", Grammy Award for Best Jazz Fusion Performance
- 1981 "Boy from New York City", Grammy Award for Best Pop Performance By A Duo Or Group With Vocal
- 1981 "A Nightingale Sang in Berkeley Square", Grammy Award for Best Vocal Arrangement for Two or More Voices, Gene Puerling
- 1981 "Until I Met You (Corner Pocket)", Grammy Award for Best Jazz Vocal Performance, Duo or Group
- 1982 "Route 66", Grammy Award for Best Jazz Vocal Performance, Duo or Group
- 1983 "Why Not! (Manhattan Carnival)", Grammy Award for Best Jazz Vocal Performance, Duo or Group
- 1986 Vocalese, Grammy Award for Best Jazz Vocal Performance, Duo or Group
- 1986 "Another Night in Tunisia", Grammy Award for Best Vocal Arrangement for Two or More Voices, Bobby McFerrin and Cheryl Bentyne, performed by The Manhattan Transfer
- 1989 Brasil, Grammy Award for Best Pop Performance by a Duo or Group with Vocals
- 1992 "Sassy", Grammy Award for Best Contemporary Jazz Performance, Instrumental
- 1998 Vocal Group Hall of Fame
- 2018 Barbershop Harmony Society Honorary Members Award

== Discography ==
=== Albums ===
Album	Label	Year	Peak chart positions						Certifications
Album	Label	Year	US	US Jazz	US R&B	UK	AUS	NZ	Certifications
Jukin'	Capitol	1971	—	—	—	—	—	—	
The Manhattan Transfer	Atlantic	1975	33	—	—	49	—	—	BPI: Gold
Coming Out	Atlantic	1976	48	—	—	12	29	18	
Pastiche	Atlantic	1978	66	—	—	10	39	—	BPI: Gold
The Manhattan Transfer Live	Atlantic	1978	—	—	—	4	71	17	BPI: Platinum
Extensions	Atlantic	1979	55	—	—	63	91	48	
Mecca for Moderns	Atlantic	1981	22	6	—	—	65	21	
Bodies and Souls	Atlantic	1983	52	10	38	53	75	49	
Bop Doo-Wopp	Atlantic	1984	127	11	—	—	—	—	
Vocalese	Atlantic	1985	74	2	—	—	—	39	
Live	Atlantic	1987	187	—	—	—	—	—	
Brasil	Atlantic	1987	98	2	—	—	—	—	
The Offbeat of Avenues	Columbia	1991	179	2	—	—	—	—	
The Christmas Album	Columbia	1992	120	—	—	—	—	—	
The Manhattan Transfer Meets Tubby the Tuba	Summit	1994	—	—	—	—	—	—	
Tonin'	Atlantic	1995	123	—	—	—	—	—	
Man-Tora! Live in Tokyo	Rhino	1996	—	—	—	—	—	—	
Swing	Atlantic	1997	—	1	—	—	—	—	
The Spirit of St. Louis	Atlantic	2000	—	3	—	—	—	—	
Couldn't Be Hotter	Telarc	2003	—	12	—	—	—	—	
Vibrate	Telarc	2004	—	11	—	—	—	—	
An Acapella Christmas	King / Rhino	2004	—	9	—	—	—	—	
The Symphony Sessions	Rhino	2006	—	—	—	—	—	—	
The Chick Corea Songbook	4Q / King	2009	—	10	—	—	—	—	
The Junction	BMG	2018	—	—	—	—	—	—	
Fifty	Craft Recordings	2022	—	—	—	—	—	—	
"—" denotes releases that did not chart or were not released in that territory.

Compilations

- The Best of The Manhattan Transfer (Atlantic, 1981) – ARIA: Platinum
- Anthology: Down in Birdland (Atlantic, 1992)[2CD]
- The Very Best of The Manhattan Transfer (Atlantic, 1994)
- Boy from New York City and Other Hits (Flashback, 1997)
- The Definitive Pop Collection (Rhino, 2005)[2CD]

=== Singles ===
Year	Title	Peak chart positions								Certifications
Year	Title	US	US AC	US Dance	US R&B	UK	AUS	CAN	NZ	Certifications
1975	"Operator"	22	34	—	—	—	60	26	—	
1976	"Tuxedo Junction"	—	—	—	—	24	—	—	—	
1977	"Chanson D'Amour"	—	16	—	—	1	9	—	14	BPI: Gold
1977	"Don't Let Go"	—	—	—	—	32	—	—	—	
1978	"Walk In Love"	—	—	—	—	12	—	—	—	
1978	"On a Little Street in Singapore"	—	—	—	—	20	—	—	—	
1978	"Where Did Our Love Go/Je Voulais Te Dire (Que Je T'Attends)"	—	—	—	—	40	27	—	—	
1979	"Who What Where When Why"	—	—	—	—	49	—	—	—	
1979	"I Kiss Your Hand Madam"	—	—	—	—	—	54	—	—	
1980	"Twilight Zone" / "Twilight Tone"	30	—	4	—	25	28	—	15	
1980	"Trickle Trickle"	73	—	—	—	—	25	—	32	
1981	"The Boy from New York City"	7	4	30	—	—	36	8	2	
1981	"Smile Again"	—	41	—	—	—	—	—	—	
1982	"Spies in the Night"	103	—	—	—	—	—	—	—	
1982	"Route 66"	78	22	—	—	—	—	—	—	
1983	"Spice of Life"	40	5	29	32	19	—	—	—	
1984	"Mystery"	102	6	—	—	—	—	—	—	
1984	"Baby Come Back to Me (The Morse Code of Love)"	83	14	—	—	—	—	—	—	
1987	"Soul Food to Go (Sina)"	—	25	—	—	—	—	—	—	
1995	"Too Busy Thinking About My Baby" (with Phil Collins)	—	27	—	—	—	—	58	—	
"—" denotes releases that did not chart or were not released in that territory.

=== Guest/soundtrack appearances ===
- Schöner Gigolo, armer Gigolo OST (1979): "Johnny," "Jealous Eyes," "I Kiss Your Hand, Madame" Conducted by Frank Barber/ Produced by Tim Hauser
- Sharky's Machine OST (1981): "Route 66"
- Weather Report, Procession (Columbia, 1983): "Where the Moon Goes"
- A League of Their Own OST (1992): "Choo Choo Ch'Boogie" and "On the Sunny Side of the Street"
- Home Improvement (1992): Sing "Santa Claus Is Coming To Town" and "It Came Upon The Midnight Clear" as part of a Tool Time Christmas special ("I'm Scheming Of A White Christmas", Season 2).
- Swing Kids OST (1993): "Bei Mir Bist du Schön" was sung by Janis Siegel
- Various artists, Tapestry Revisited: A Tribute to Carole King (Atlantic, 1995): "Smackwater Jack"
- Pentatonix, A Pentatonix Christmas (RCA, 2016): "White Christmas"

=== In other media ===
"Chanson d'Amour" was featured in Are You Being Served, performed by all the staff of Grace Brothers department store in the final episode of the long running sitcom.

The Manhattan Transfer was parodied in a sketch of the 1990s Argentine comedy show Cha Cha Cha, where the group was renamed as "Los Maltrattan Hamsters" (a wordplay meaning "They Mistreat Hamsters"), and were led by a fictitious Albino band leader named "Albin Stromber".
