= Bill Johnson (reed player) =

American saxophonist (1912–1960)

- Born: William Luther Johnson; September 30, 1912; Jacksonville, Florida, U.S.
- Died: July 5, 1960 (aged 47) New York City, New York, U.S.
- Genres: Jazz
- Instruments: Saxophone, clarinet

William Luther Johnson (September 30, 1912 – July 5, 1960) was an American alto saxophonist, clarinetist, and arranger.

== Early life and education ==
Johnson studied piano as a child and began playing the alto saxophone at the age of 16. After working with lesser-known bands he studied in conservatories in Wisconsin and Illinois, then attended Marquette University.

== Career ==
While in Milwaukee, Johnson played with Jabbo Smith and others. He worked with Baron Lee and Tiny Bradshaw, and in 1936 joined Erskine Hawkins, with whom he performed into the early 1940s. His recordings with Hawkins include "Uptown Shuffle"' (1939, Bb 10504) and "Bear Mash Blues" (1942, Bb 30–0813); he also arranged the former title, as well as "Uncle Bud" (1941, Bb 11372), and he composed "Tuxedo Junction" with Hawkins. He appears with the latter's band in the short film Deviled Hams (1937).

There's a record on Alert from around mid-1946 by "Bill Johnson and Orchestra," which is the beginning of his subsequent group, the Musical Notes. The members, as given on the label, were: Bill Johnson (alto sax), Ray Turner (tenor sax), Gene Brooks (drums), Clifton "Skeeter" Best (guitar), Jimmy Robinson (bass), and Egbert "Sharkie" Victor (piano). The song was "If I Was A Itty Bitty Girl," with vocals by Grace Smith (who had a couple of subsequent releases on National and Avalon).

Presumably those sides were recorded a bit earlier, since, by the Spring of 1946, several of the members had become the Musical Notes: Bill Johnson (tenor lead, alto sax and clarinet), West Indian Egbert Victor (baritone and piano), Clifton "Skeeter" Best (second tenor and guitar; he, too, seems to have been with Erskine Hawkins for a while), Jimmy Robinson (baritone/bass and bassist), and Gus Gordon (lead tenor and cocktail drums).

Bill Johnson and the Musical Notes recorded for Harlem, RCA, King, Regal, Tru-Blue, Ronnex (as the Bill Johnson Quartet), Jubilee (Ronnex masters), and Baton (Bill Johnson Quintet). Over the years, there were many personnel changes, but Bill and Gus Gordon were on all the recordings.

== Personal life ==
Johnson was diagnosed with lung cancer in 1957, which caused the breakup of the group, although he re-formed it on a couple of occasions.
