= Four Brothers (jazz standard) =

1947 jazz standard by Jimmy Guiffre

Four Brothers is a jazz standard in AABA format written by Jimmy Giuffre in 1947, based on the chord changes of 'Jeepers Creepers'. The song was written for the "Four Brothers" saxophone section of Woody Herman's second band, and has since been covered by many groups.

== Notable recordings ==
Woody Herman recorded it on December 27, 1947, for Columbia records with his second Herd, which had been organized earlier that year. It features the "Four Brothers" saxophone section of Zoot Sims, Serge Chaloff, Herbie Steward, and Stan Getz, playing in that order. All four played in the light, almost vibrato-less, style of their idol, Lester Young. The song so typifies the sound of Woody Herman's second Herd that the band is also known as the Four Brothers Band.

Giuffre recorded it in 1955 when it was released on his debut album by Capitol. He again recorded it in 1958, an album released by Atlantic titled The Four Brothers Sound.

== See also ==
- List of jazz contrafacts
