= Janis Siegel =

American singer

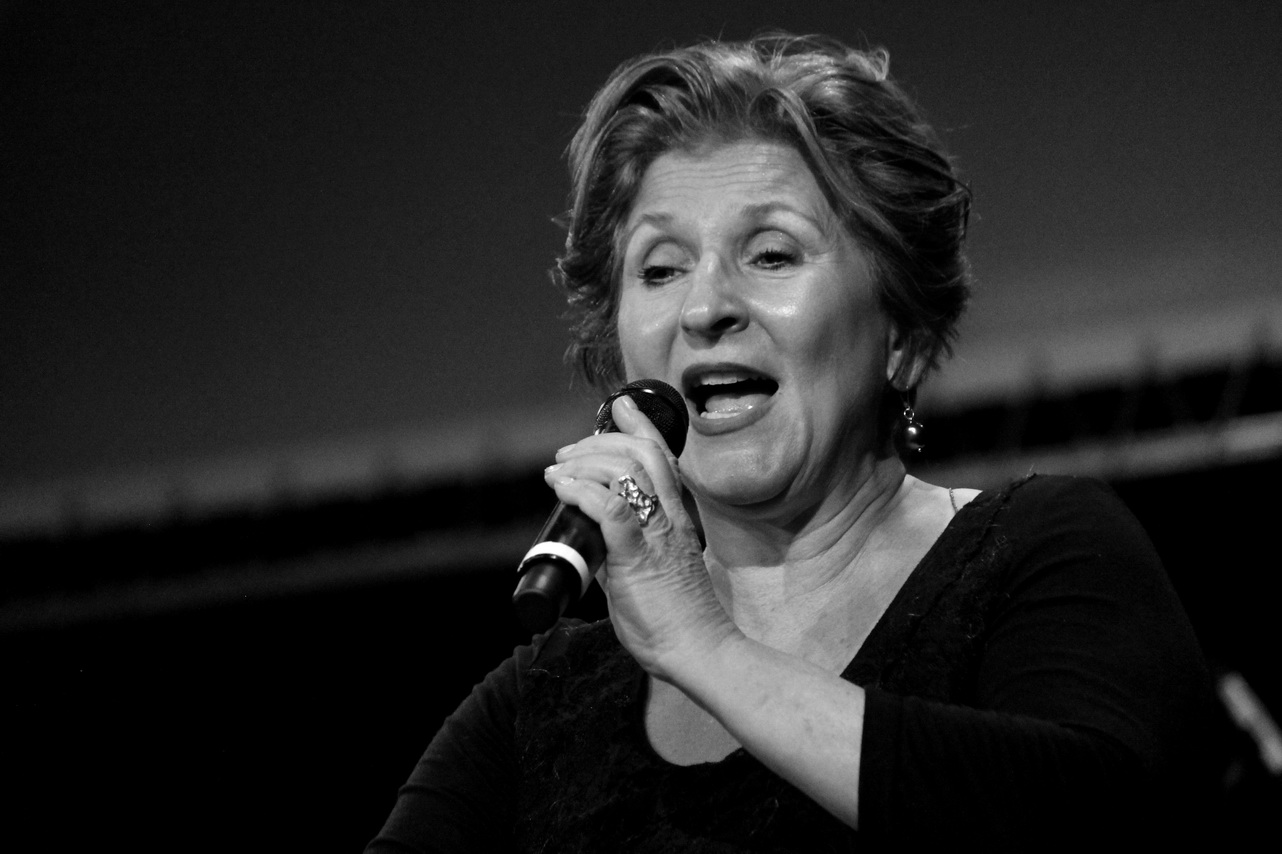

Background information
- Born: July 23, 1952 (age 73); Brooklyn, New York
- Genres: Vocal jazz, a cappella, pop
- Occupation: Singer
- Years active: 1965–present
- Labels: Atlantic, Varèse Sarabande, Monarch, Telarc, Palmetto, ACT
- Website: www.janis-siegel.com

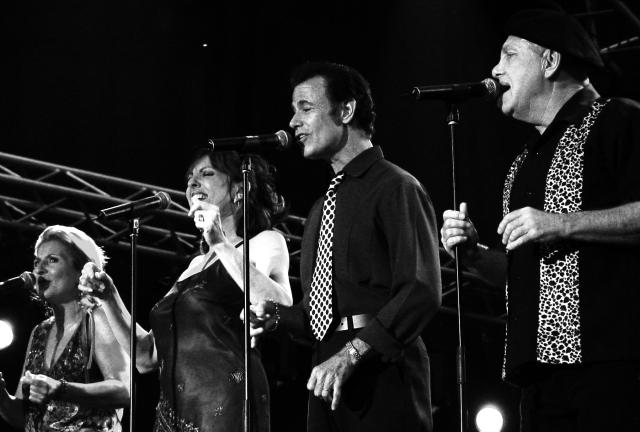
From left to right: Janis Siegel, Cheryl Bentyne, Alan Paul, and Tim Hauser

Janis Siegel (born July 23, 1952) is a multiple grammy-winning American jazz singer, best known as a member of the vocal group The Manhattan Transfer.

== Musical career ==
In 1965, Siegel made her recording debut with a group called Young Generation on Red Bird Records. After one single, "The Hideaway", the group disbanded, and then Siegel went on to join the folk trio The Loved Ones (later Laurel Canyon).

In 1972, after the original Manhattan Transfer had disbanded, founder Tim Hauser met Siegel at a party. After recording some demos, she agreed to join the group, and on October 1, 1972, the Manhattan Transfer was reformed. This incarnation of the group has enjoyed international popularity, covering songs from the 1930s through the 1980s in a variety of genres including jazz fusion, R&B, pop, and doo wop. The group has received 10 Grammy Awards during Siegel's ongoing tenure, and was inducted into the Vocal Group Hall of Fame in 2003.

In addition to her work with the Transfer, Siegel has maintained a solo career, releasing her first album, Experiment in White, in 1982.

In 1985, Siegel joined Jon Hendricks, Bobby McFerrin and Dianne Reeves in a group called Sing, Sing, Sing. In 2015, she released Honey & Air, a collaboration with John DiMartino and Nanny Assis as the Requinte Trio. She has also been a member of Bobby McFerrin's Voicestra.

== Awards ==
She won 10 Grammys as a member of the Manhattan Transfer. Her second solo album, At Home (1987), was nominated for a Grammy Award for Best Jazz Vocal Performance, Female.

In 1993, Siegel was awarded an Honorary Doctorate of Music from Berklee College of Music.

== Discography ==
- Experiment In White (Atlantic, 1982)
- At Home (Atlantic, 1987)
- Short Stories with Fred Hersch (Atlantic, 1989)
- Slow Hot Wind with Fred Hersch (Varèse Sarabande, 1995)
- The Tender Trap (Monarch, 1999)
- I Wish You Love (Telarc, 2002)
- Friday Night Special (Telarc, 2003)
- Sketches Of Broadway (Telarc, 2004)
- A Thousand Beautiful Things (Telarc, 2006)
- That Old Mercer Magic, with Laurel Massé and Lauren Kinhan as Jalala (Dare, 2009)
- Night Songs: A Late Night Interlude (Palmetto, 2013)
- Honey And Air, with the Requinte Trio (ArtistShare, 2015)
- Mazel, with John Di Martino and Cantor Daniel Kramer (Night is Alive, 2020)
- Cryin' In My Whiskey with John Di Martino (Night is Alive, 2021)
- The Colors Of My Life (A Cy Coleman Songbook) with Yaron Gershovsky (Club44 Records, 2024)

=== As guest ===
- Cheryl Bentyne, Rearrangements of Shadows (ArtistShare, 2017)
- Richie Cole, Hollywood Madness (Muse, 1980)
- Richie Cole, Bossa Nova Eyes (Palo Alto, 1985)
- Frank Colon, Latin Wonder: Frank Colon Plays Stevie Wonder (Elephant, 2000)
- Lorraine Feather, Language (Jazzed Media, 2008)
- Steve Hass, Traveler (Hassbeat Productions, 2003) Siegel sings on "People Get Ready", "The Heart of Saturday Night", and "Skylark".
- Jon Hendricks, Freddie Freeloader (Denon, 1990)
- Robert Kraft, Retro Active (RCA Victor, 1982)
- Erich Kunzel, Got Swing (Telarc, 2003)
- Nils Landgren, Some Other Time: A Tribute to Leonard Bernstein (ACT, 2016)
- Jeff Lorber, Worth Waiting For (Verve Forecast, 1993)
- Bobby McFerrin, Spontaneous Inventions (Blue Note, 1986)
- Bobby McFerrin, Circlesongs (Sony Classical, 1997)
- Jay McShann, The Big Apple Bash (Atlantic, 1979)
- İlhan Mimaroğlu, String Quartet No. 4 (Finnadar, 1981)
- Renee Rosnes, Ice on the Hudson: Songs by Renee Rosnes and David Hajdu (SMK, 2018)
- Rumer, Into Colour (Atlantic, 2014)
- Spyro Gyra, A Night Before Christmas (Heads Up, 2008)
- Bobby Sanabria, Vox Humana featuring Janis Siegel, Antoinette Montague, Jennifer Jade Ledesna (JazzHeads, 2023)
- Leon Ware, Why I Came To California from Leon Ware (Elektra, 1982)
