= Cheryl Bentyne =

American jazz singer

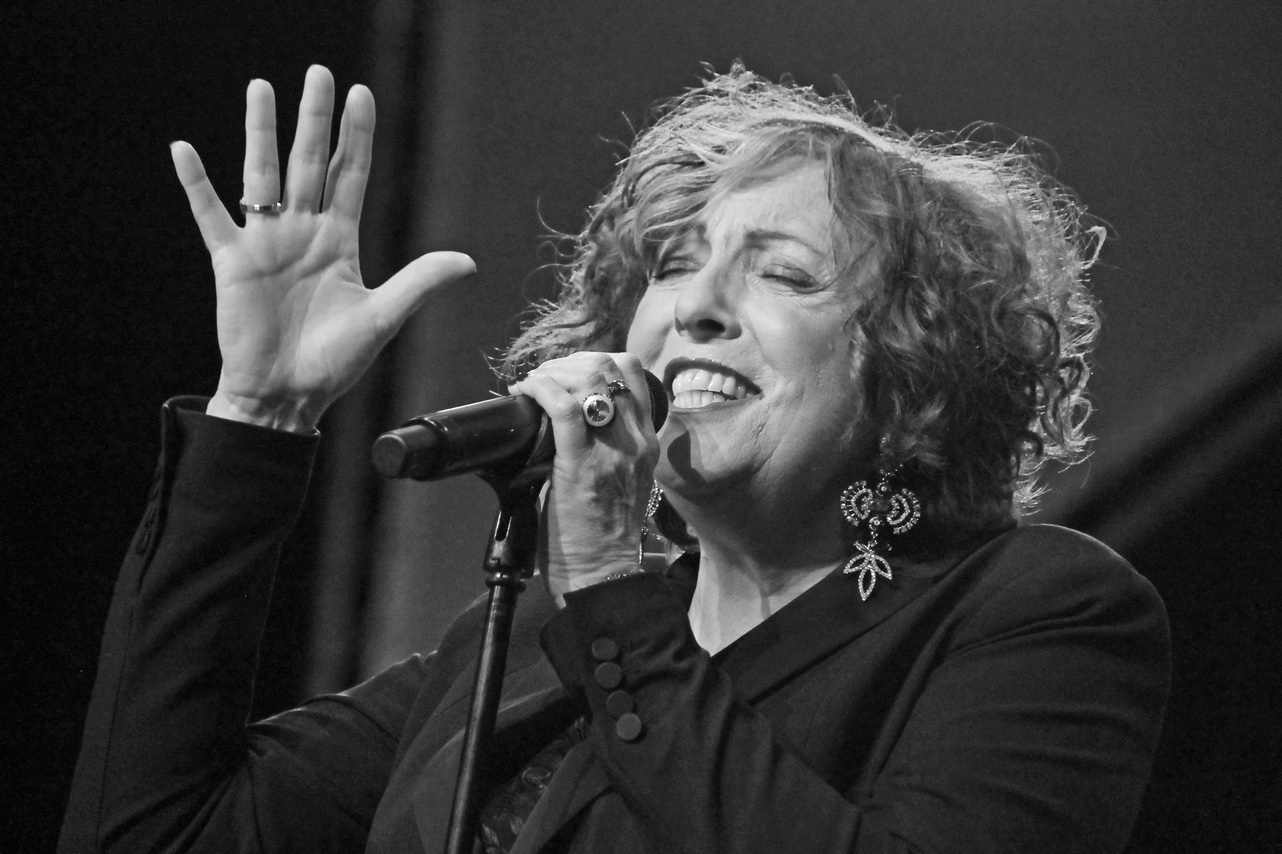

Background information
- Born: January 17, 1954 (age 72); Mount Vernon, Washington, U.S.
- Genres: Vocal jazz; pop
- Occupation: Singer
- Years active: 1975–present
- Labels: Columbia; Telarc; King; ArtistShare; Summit

Cheryl Bentyne (born Cheryl Benthien; January 17, 1954) is an American jazz singer who spent much of her career with the vocal group the Manhattan Transfer.

== Early years ==
Bentyne started singing at age 13 with her father's Dixieland and swing band. Following graduation from Mount Vernon High School, she enrolled at Skagit Valley College and studied music and theater. She moved to Seattle in the mid 1970s and sang with John Holte's New Deal Rhythm Band. The NDRB trombonist Gary McKaig gave her an album by the Manhattan Transfer. After four years in Seattle, she moved to Los Angeles.

== The Manhattan Transfer ==
In 1979, Bentyne became the permanent replacement for singer Laurel Massé in the Manhattan Transfer, when Massé left the group after being injured in an automobile accident. Her first appearance was on the album Extensions (1979), which won the group its first Grammy Award, Best Jazz Fusion Performance for a vocalese version of the song "Birdland" by Weather Report.

She won ten Grammy Awards with the Manhattan Transfer, including awards for her arrangement of "Another Night in Tunisia" with Bobby McFerrin and for writing the song "Sassy" for the album The Offbeat of Avenues.

== Solo career ==
Her debut solo album, Something Cool (Columbia, 1992), was produced by trumpeter Mark Isham and consisted of traditional pop and jazz standards. This was followed by Dreaming of Mister Porter (2000), a tribute to Cole Porter; Talk of the Town (2004) with Kenny Barron, David "Fathead" Newman, Chuck Mangione; and Let Me Off Uptown (2005), a tribute to Anita O'Day. While still a member of the Manhattan Transfer, she recorded the album Duets with bassist Rob Wasserman. In 1991, she collaborated with Mark Isham on a song for the soundtrack to the film Mortal Thoughts.

Bentyne left music in 2012 due to illness. Her spleen was removed and she was diagnosed with Hodgkin's lymphoma. Margaret Dorn replaced her in the Manhattan Transfer. Within a year, a doctor told her she was free of cancer, and she returned to singing.

In 2013, she narrated an audiobook version of the best-selling book Little Girl Blue, a biography of singer Karen Carpenter. In 2014, she was a judge and mentor for the Songbook Academy, a summer program for high school students operated by the Great American Songbook Foundation founded by Michael Feinstein.

== Awards and honors ==
- Grammy Award for Best Jazz Fusion Performance, Vocal or Instrumental, "Birdland" (from Extensions), The Manhattan Transfer, 1980; "Until I Met You (Corner Pocket)" (from Mecca for Moderns), The Manhattan Transfer, 1981
- Grammy Award for Best Jazz Vocal Performance, Duo or Group, "Route 66" (from the soundtrack Sharkey's Machine), The Manhattan Transfer, 1982; "Why Not!" (from Bodies and Souls), The Manhattan Transfer, 1983; Vocalese, The Manhattan Transfer, 1985
- Grammy Award for Best Pop Performance by a Duo or Group, Brasil; The Manhattan Transfer, 1987; "The Boy from New York City" (from Mecca for Moderns), The Manhattan Transfer, 1981
- Grammy Award for Best Arrangement for Voices, "Another Night in Tunisia" (from Vocalese), Cheryl Bentyne and Bobby McFerrin, arrangers, 1985
- Grammy Award for Best Contemporary Jazz Performance, "Sassy" (from The Offbeat of Avenues), The Manhattan Transfer, 1992
- Honorary Doctorate of Music from Berklee College of Music, 1993
- Golden Disc Award, Swing Journal: Talk of the Town, 2003; Waltz for Debby, 2004; Songs of Our Time, 2008

== Discography ==
- Something Cool (Columbia, 1992)
- Dreaming of Mister Porter (released through Manhattan Transfer Fan Club, 2000)
- Talk of The Town (Paddle Wheel, 2002)
- The Lights Still Burn (Paddle Wheel, 2003)
- Moonlight Serenade (King, 2003)
- Cheryl Bentyne Sings Waltz for Debby (Paddle Wheel, 2004)
- Let Me Off Uptown (Telarc, 2005)
- The Book of Love (Telarc, 2006)
- Songs of Our Time (Paddle Wheel, 2008)
- The Cole Porter Songbook (Paddle Wheel, 2009)
- The Gershwin Songbook (ArtistShare, 2010)
- Let's Misbehave: The Cole Porter Songbook (Summit, 2012) – reissue of the 2009 album
- West Coast Cool with Mark Winkler (Summit, 2013)
- Lost Love Songs (Summit, 2016) – compilation of The Lights Still Burn, Moonlight Serenade, and Songs of Our Time
- ReArrangements of Shadows (ArtistShare, 2017)
- Eastern Standard Time with Mark Winkler (Café Pacific, 2018)
