= Tim Hauser =

American singer (1941–2014)

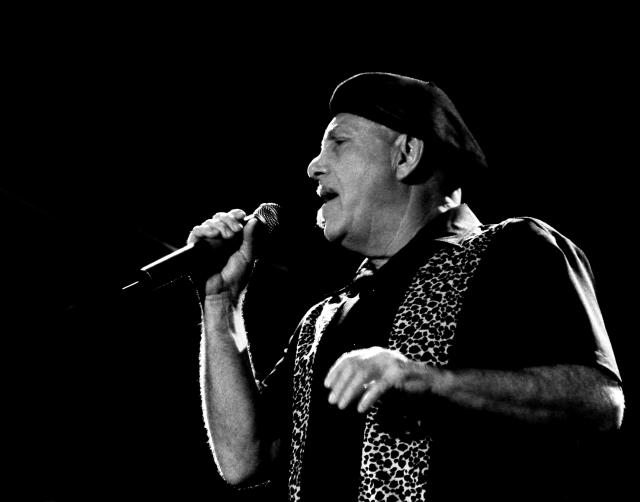

Background information
- Born: Timothy DuPron Hauser; December 12, 1941; Troy, New York, U.S.
- Died: October 16, 2014 (aged 72) Sayre, Pennsylvania, U.S.
- Genres: Jazz, pop, doo wop
- Occupation: Singer
- Instrument: Vocals
- Formerly of: The Manhattan Transfer

Timothy DuPron Hauser (December 12, 1941 – October 16, 2014) was an American singer and founding member of the Manhattan Transfer vocal group. He won 10 Grammy Awards as a member of The Manhattan Transfer.

== Early life ==
Hauser was born in Troy, New York. When he was seven he moved with his family to the Jersey Shore, living in Wanamassa, Ocean Township, Monmouth County, and, later, in Asbury Park. He graduated in 1959 from St. Rose High School (Belmar), where an award in his name has been given every year since 1989 to students who excel in theater arts.

When he was fifteen, he began to sing professionally. He founded a doo-wop quartet named The Criterions. For the Cecilia label the Criterions recorded two singles: "I Remain Truly Yours" and "Don't Say Goodbye". The group appeared on the Big Beat Show hosted by Alan Freed.

In 1959, Hauser entered Villanova University. With Tommy West and Jim Ruf, both from The Criterions, he formed the folk group the Troubadours Three. He was a member of the Villanova Singers and the Villanova Spires/Coventry Lads with classmate Jim Croce. He spent four years on the staff of college radio station WWVU. In 1963, he graduated from Villanova with a degree in economics. In 1964, Hauser served in the United States Air Force and the New Jersey Air National Guard.

In 1965, he began his career in marketing. From 1965 to 1966, he worked as a market research analyst with the advertising agency Sullivan, Stauffer, Colwell, and Bayles. His accounts included Pepsodent Toothpaste (Lever Bros.), Micrin Mouthwash (Johnson & Johnson), and Rise Shaving Cream (Carter Products).

From 1966 to 1968, he worked as manager of the Market Research Department for the Special Products Division of Nabisco. His accounts included cereal and pet food.

== Music career ==
In 1969, he formed the first version of The Manhattan Transfer with Gene Pistilli, Marty Nelson, Erin Dickins, and Pat Rosalia. The group had a jazz/R&B sound and recorded one album, Jukin' , for Capitol Records under manager Richard Flanzer. This version of the group dissolved after one album.

Hauser drove a cab to support himself while pursuing a music career. Through this job, he met Laurel Massé, a waitress and aspiring singer. He was again driving his cab when he picked up the conga player for the group Laurel Canyon who invited him to a party where he met Janis Siegel. With Massé they reformed The Manhattan Transfer. They needed a male singer, so they contacted Alan Paul. The four became The Manhattan Transfer on October 1, 1972.

After a car accident, Massé decided to leave the group and pursue a solo career, and in 1978 Cheryl Bentyne was hired to replace her. From then until Hauser's death, the line-up was mostly unchanged with only occasional substitutions due to illness. After his death, he was replaced by Trist Curless.

The Manhattan Transfer won the Downbeat and Playboy Readers' Polls every year in the 1980s for best vocal group. In 2007, they won the JazzTimes Readers' Poll for best vocal group. When Ahmet Ertegün founded the Rock and Roll Hall of Fame, he selected Hauser to serve on the voting committee, a position he held for three years (1986–1989). In 1993, Hauser was awarded an honorary doctorate degree from the Berklee College of Music.

== Personal life ==
He was married to Barbara Sennet, Lori Lethin, and Lorna Marie Fenenbock.

== Death ==
Hauser died of cardiac arrest at the Robert Packer Hospital in Sayre, Pennsylvania, on October 16, 2014, at the age of 72. He had been admitted to the hospital for pneumonia.
