= Alan Paul =

American singer and composer (born 1949)

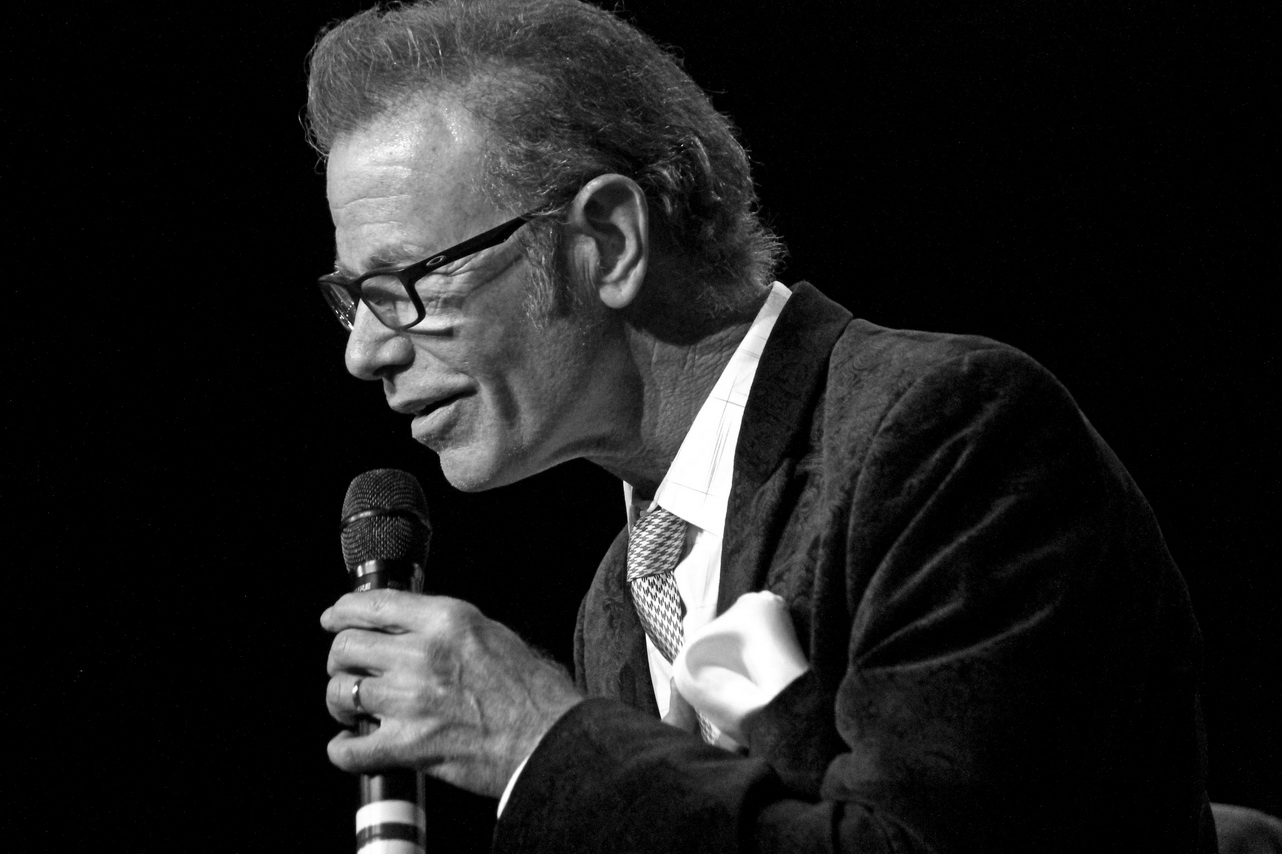
- Alan Paul

Background information
- Born: November 23, 1949 (age 76); Newark, New Jersey, U.S.
- Genre: a cappella
- Occupation: Singer
- Instrument: Vocals
- Formerly of: The Manhattan Transfer

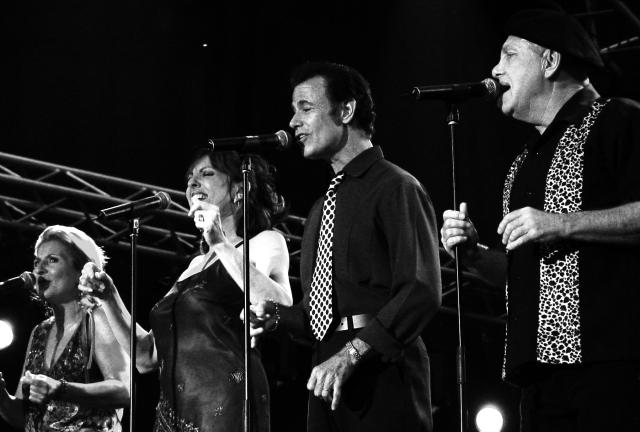
Manhattan Transfer, second from right Alan Paul

Alan Paul Wichinsky (born November 23, 1949) is an American Grammy Award-winning singer and composer, best known as one of the founding members of the current incarnation of the vocal group The Manhattan Transfer.

== Education ==
Raised in Newark and Hillside, New Jersey Paul graduated from Hillside High School and attended Newark State College (now Kean University) where he earned a BA in Music Education. He received two Honorary Doctorate degrees, one in The Humanities from Kean University and another in Music from Berklee School of Music.

== Career ==
He began his professional career on Broadway at the age of 12 in the original cast of Oliver! After college, he returned to Broadway as Teen Angel and Johnny Casino in the original cast of Grease, where he introduced the songs "Beauty School Dropout" and "Born to Hand Jive". In 2004, he released a solo CD called Another Place in Time. He also provided Dino Spumoni's singing voice on the animated television series Hey Arnold!

== Awards ==
As a writer and arranger for The Manhattan Transfer, he earned four Grammy nominations for his compositions "Twilight Zone/Twilight Tone" and "Code Of Ethics" and for his vocal arrangements for "Ray’s Rockhouse". He received a Grammy nomination for Best Jazz Vocalist, Male.

== Personal life ==
Paul has been married to writer/model Angela Paul for 42 years, they have one daughter.
