= The Bonnie Banks o' Loch Lomond =

Traditional Scottish folk song

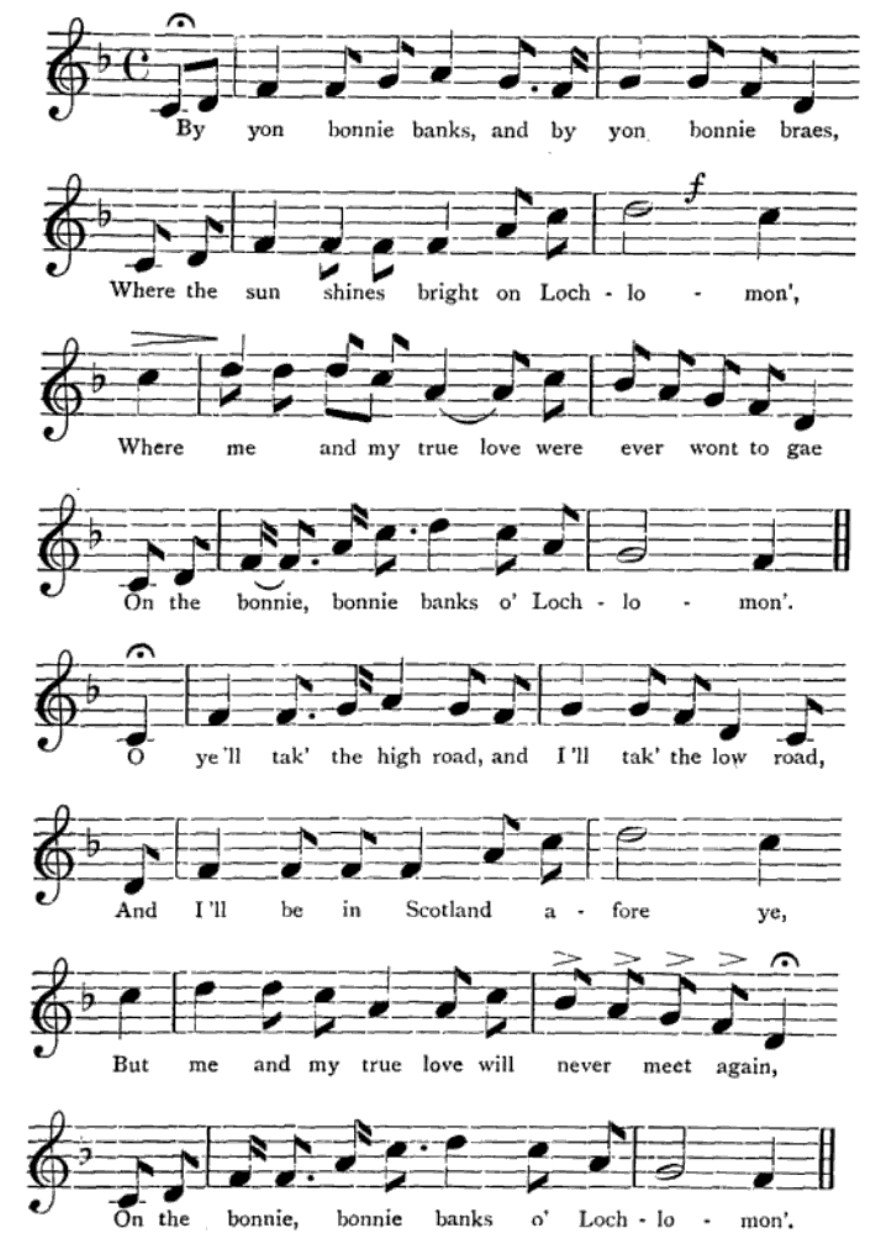
"The Bonnie Banks o' Loch Lomond" (ed. Robert Ford, 1904)

"The Bonnie Banks o' Loch Lomond" (or "Loch Lomond") is a traditional Scottish folk song (Roud No. 9598). Its origins are thought to date to the Jacobite rising of 1745.

Loch Lomond is the largest Scottish loch. In Scots, "bonnie" means "fair" or "beautiful".

== Lyrics ==
By yon bonnie banks and by yon bonnie braes,
Where the sun shines bright on Loch Lomond,
Where me and my true love were ever wont to gae,
On the bonnie, bonnie banks o' Loch Lomond.

Chorus:
O ye'll tak' the high road, and I'll tak' the low road,
And I'll be in Scotland afore ye,
But me and my true love will never meet again,
On the bonnie, bonnie banks o' Loch Lomond.

'Twas there that we parted, in yon shady glen,
On the steep, steep side o' Ben Lomond,
Where in soft purple hue, the highland hills we view,
And the moon coming out in the gloaming.
(Chorus)

The wee birdies sing and the wildflowers spring,
And in sunshine the waters are sleeping.
But the broken heart it kens nae second spring again,
Though the waeful may cease frae their grieving.
(Chorus)

== Interpretation ==
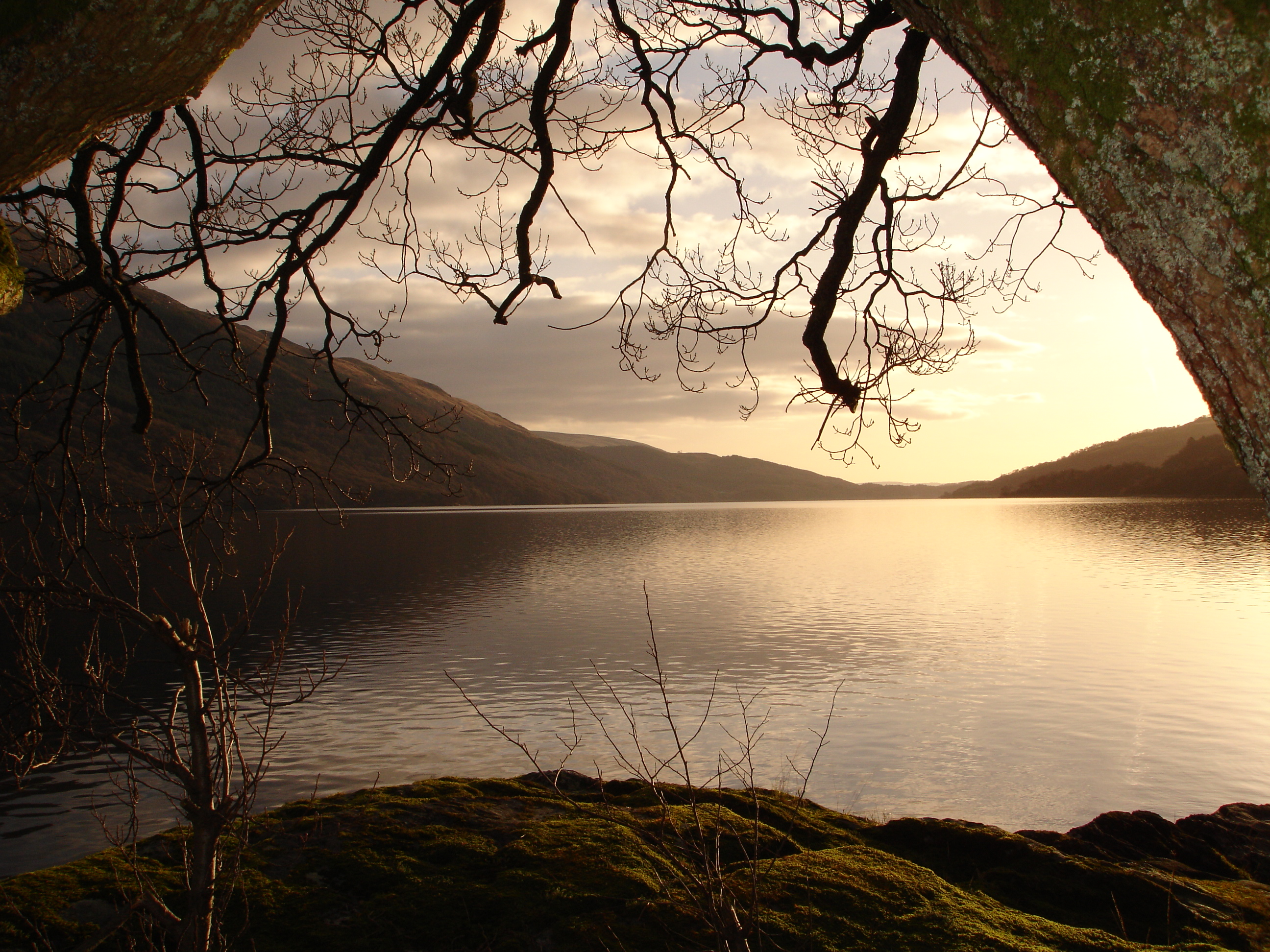
View of Loch Lomond, December 2005

The song has often been dated to 1746, and it has long been associated with the Jacobite rebellion. In December 1745, Bonnie Prince Charlie retreated to Scotland, and the lyrics have been interpreted as a lament of the march. One of the soldiers rues his sacrifice for the king. In Celtic mythology, the "low road" was a fairy route for a soldier's soul to return home when killed abroad.

Another common interpretation is that the chorus are the final words spoken by one of the Jacobite rebels prior to his execution, perhaps in Carlisle, where dozens of rebels were executed. He sees his lover at the gallows and tells her they will meet again in Scotland, albeit by different routes. Ironically, the song became one of a handful of folk signifiers for British unity as the nation expanded its empire.

One of the earliest sheet music printings of the ballad was in 1840 by Paterson and Sons in Edinburgh. It was titled "Bonnie Loch Loman" and credited to "a lady" with arrangements by Finlay Dunn and John Thomson. Lady John Scott was often cited as the composer of "Loch Lomond", but she only transcribed the melody and lyrics after hearing it sung by a boy in the Edinburgh streets. In his 1898 novel Wild Eelin, William Black has the title character, Eelin MacDonald, directly refute the idea that a street urchin in Edinburgh would ever sing the song, dismissing it as "spurious".

The actual composer is unknown. Precedents for the tune have been found in several other folk songs, such as the Danish/Faroese tune "Dankonning lod gribe en havfrue fin" (The Dane-King Captured a Mermaid). "Loch Lomond" along with "The Oak and the Ash" also bear a resemblance to "Godesses", a tune in John Playford's 1651 compilation The Dancing Master.

There are also similar melodic fragments in "The Bonniest Lass In A' The World" and "The Bonnie House of Airlie". "Loch Lomond" has often been described as sharing a melody with "Kind Robin Loes Me" and all its variants like "Robin Cushie".

=== Variants ===
Both the 1840 sheet music and Lady John Scott's lyrics differ significantly from the most common form of the song today. An 1849 broadside called "Flora's Lament for Her Charlie" largely parallels the lyrics of "Loch Lomond". Flora MacDonald was a supporter of Bonnie Prince Charlie, and she was imprisoned for helping Charles escape his pursuers. There are even hyperlocal variants like the one that changes "'Twas there that we parted, in yon shady glen" to "We'll meet whaur we parted in bonnie Luss glen".

The song is often misattributed to Scottish poet and folklorist Andrew Lang. In 1876, he wrote a poem called "The Bonnie Banks o' Loch Lomond, 1746".

THERE's an ending o' the dance, and fair Morag's safe in France,
And the Clans they hae paid the lawing,
And the wuddy has her ain, and we twa are left alane,
Free o' Carlisle gaol in the dawing.

So ye'll tak the high road, and I'll tak the laigh road,
An' I'll be in Scotland before ye:
But me and my true love will never meet again,
By the bonnie, bonnie banks o' Loch Lomond.

For my love's heart brake in twa, when she kenned the Cause's fa',
And she sleeps where there's never nane shall waken,
Where the glen lies a' in wrack, wi' the houses toom and black,
And her father's ha's forsaken.

While there's heather on the hill shall my vengeance ne'er be still,
While a bush hides the glint o' a gun, lad;
Wi' the men o' Sergeant Môr shall I work to pay the score,
Till I wither on the wuddy in the sun, lad!

So ye'll tak the high road, and I'll tak the laigh road,
An' I'll be in Scotland before ye:
But me and my true love will never meet again,
By the bonnie, bonnie banks o' Loch Lomond.

"Wuddy" is a euphemism for a noose. "Morag" refers to Bonnie Prince Charlie who was defeated in 1746. "Sergeant Môr" is John Du Cameron, a supporter of Bonnie Prince Charlie who continued fighting as an outlaw until he was captured and hanged in 1753. Several Scots terms are used like "lawing" (reckoning) and "dawing" (dawn).

In William Black's novel, Eelin MacDonald sings her own version of "Loch Lomond". She wrote the new lyrics because she views the popular ones as "rubbish".

The Irish variant of the song is called "Red Is the Rose" and is sung with the same melody but different (although similarly themed) lyrics. It was popularized by Irish folk musician Tommy Makem. Even though many people mistakenly believe that Makem wrote "Red Is the Rose", it is a traditional Irish folk song.

== Legacy ==
"Loch Lomond" has been arranged and recorded by many composers and performers over the years, in several genres ranging from traditional Scottish folk to barbershop to rock and roll.

=== Classical music ===
Charles Ives quotes "Loch Lomond" in "The Alcotts" movement of his Concord Sonata.

In 1921, Ralph Vaughan Williams arranged "Loch Lomond" for baritone solo and male choir. It has been recorded several times, notably by the tenor Ian Partridge and the London Madrigal Singers for EMI in 1970.

=== Jazz ===
The Jazz Discography, an online index of studio recordings, live recordings, and broadcast transcriptions of jazz – as of May 22, 2019 – lists 106 recordings of "Loch Lomond" and one recording of "Bonnie Banks o' Loch Lomond".

Jazz singer Maxine Sullivan recorded "Loch Lomond" on August 6, 1937 (matrix 21472-1; Vocalion-OKeh 364). Sullivan's version was arranged by Claude Thornhill. It inspired countless other acts to start swinging folk songs. It was a career-defining song, and she recorded it 14 times in total. Her last recording was a live performance at the Fujitsu-Concord Jazz Festival in Tokyo, on September 28, 1986, with the Scott Hamilton Quintet.

When Benny Goodman and His Orchestra started performing "Loch Lomond", they made sure to imitate Claude Thornhill's arrangement for Maxine Sullivan. Martha Tilton fronted the song when the band included it in the January 16, 1938 set that was immortalized on their live album The Famous 1938 Carnegie Hall Jazz Concert (Columbia SL 160).

=== Popular music ===
"Bonnie Banks o' Loch Lomond", sung by Marie Narelle.

Marie Narelle recorded "The Bonnie Banks o' Loch Lomond" for Edison Gold Moulded Records. She sang the song with an orchestra, and her performance was released in August 1906 as cylinder 9325.

Internationally famous, Scottish performer, Sir Harry Lauder, recorded "Loch Lomond" for RCA Victor Records, with an orchestra, in 1926, released on a 78 record in 1929.

Australian rock band AC/DC recorded a version of the song as "Fling Thing" and released it as the B-side to their 1976 single "Jailbreak". The song underscored the band's Scottish ancestry, and they played it at the Apollo Theatre in Glasgow during the recording of their 1978 live album If You Want Blood You've Got It. On their 1992 album AC/DC Live, the cover is simply listed as "Bonny". "Fling Thing" was later remastered and released on the 2009 box set Backtracks.

Rod Stewart's "Rhythm of My Heart" (1991) reworks the tune's melody into the chorus, turning "On the bonnie, bonnie banks of Loch Lomond" into "Where the ocean meets the sky I'll be sailing". The song was written by Marc Jordan and John Capek and first recorded by René Shuman in 1986.

=== Runrig ===
"Loch Lomond"

Single by Runrig
- B-side: "Tuireadh Iain Ruaidh"
- Released: December 1982
- Studio: Castlesound Studios, Edinburgh
- Length: 4:27
- Label: Ridge
- Songwriter: Traditional
- Producer: Chris Harley

Runrig singles chronology
"Loch Lomond" (1982)	"Dance Called America" (1984)

Scottish celtic rock band Runrig recorded "Loch Lomond" for their 1979 album The Highland Connection. Despite being three albums into their career in 1982, Runrig had never released a single. They decided to re-record "Loch Lomond" at Castlesound Studios in Edinburgh and make it their debut single release. It was released by Ridge Records in December 1982 and received moderate airplay. The single peaked at #86 on the UK Singles Chart on 8 January 1983. It remains one of their best known songs.

In 2007, Runrig re-recorded "Loch Lomond" with 50,000 members of the Tartan Army, the supporters of the Scotland national football team. The recording was part of the BBC's Children in Need fundraiser. The single was released as "Loch Lomond (Hampden Remix)" and was a commercial success. It debuted at #1 on the Scottish Singles Chart and #9 in the UK. The single was certified silver by the British Phonographic Industry.

"Loch Lomond" is also the anthem of FC Köln, and their fans sing it before each match.

"Loch Lomond"
Performed by Southern Aire of the United States Air Force Reserve Band

== TV and film ==
The song is frequently used in TV and movies to convey a sense of Scottish story setting and/or character identity.

Louis Prima ended the 1938 Vitaphone short film Swing Cat's Jamboree with a performance of "Loch Lomond".

In Our Gang Follies of 1938, an American short musical film by Hal Roach, Annabelle Logan sings a rendition of "Loch Lomond" at the local talent show. The song features in the 1940 American musical It's a Date.

In the 1945 Sherlock Holmes film Pursuit to Algiers, starring Basil Rathbone, Dr. Watson (Nigel Bruce) sings a rendition of "Loch Lomond" accompanied by Sheila Woodbury (Marjorie Riordan) on the piano.

In the 1955 Disney animated classic Lady and the Tramp, one of its characters, Jock, a Scottish Terrier, sings his own version of "The Bonnie Banks Of Loch Lomond" when he buries a new bone "in [his] bonnie, bonnie bank in the back yard".

In the 1958 Tom and Jerry short Robin Hoodwinked, Nibbles sings the first half of the chorus of "Loch Lomond".

The song is heard in the 1963 Disney film The Three Lives of Thomasina.

The Marcia Blane music class is heard singing the song in the background in The Prime of Miss Jean Brodie.

A recording of a Scotsman singing the song in captivity during the First World War featured in the 2007 BBC documentary How the Edwardians Spoke.

In the children's cartoon, Animaniacs, it is heard in "Ups and Downs" as Wakko and Dr. Scratchansniff ride the elevator. It is also heard in the Animaniacs feature film Wakko's Wish.

In the American TV series The Simpsons, Groundskeeper Willie whistles the melody in the episode "Lard of the Dance".

In the Hal Roach short comedy film Tit for Tat, Stan Laurel sings a verse of this song after Oliver Hardy declares in a verbal altercation with his neighbor that he will take the "high road" and walk away.

In Smallville Season 7 Episode 19, the tune is featured under the title "The Birks of St Kilde." It is played by a grandfather clock and later by Lex Luthor on the piano as he quotes alternative plot-important lyrics: "On the shores of St Kilde, birks sway in the wind from the left to the right again."

In the 2000 movie Prince of Central Park J.J. Somerled, played the song in keyboard while Jerry Orbach as a businessman, sang the song.

In The Office Season 8 Episode 20 "Welcome Party" Andy sings an excerpt from the song.
