= War Games (John Paul Young song) =

Single by John Paul Young

from the album One Foot in Front
- Released: March 1984
- Genre: Pop, Electronic
- Length: 3:34 (Album version); 5:44 (Extended version)
- Label: I.C. Records, Channel Records
- Songwriter(s): John Capek, Marc Jordan
- Producer(s): John Capek

John Paul Young singles chronology
"Soldier of Fortune" (1983)	"War Games" (1984)	"L.A. Sunset" (1984)

Music video
- "War Games" on YouTube

War Games is a song by Australian singer John Paul Young, released in 1984. It was released as the second single from One Foot in Front and it was written by John Capek and Marc Jordan. The song reached number 87 in Australia.

== Track listings ==
7 Inch single

No.	Title	Writer(s)	Length
1.	"War Games"	John Capek, Marc Jordan	3:34
2.	"Come On Down"	John Paul Young, Warren Morgan	3:17

12 Inch single

No.	Title	Writer(s)	Length
1.	"War Games" (Extended)	John Capek, Marc Jordan	5:44
2.	"War Games"	John Capek, Marc Jordan	3:34
3.	"War Games" (Instrumental)	John Capek, Marc Jordan	3:34
4.	"Come On Down"	John Paul Young, Warren Morgan	3:17

== Charts ==
Chart (1984)	Peak position
Australian (Kent Music Report)	87
