= Soldier of Fortune =

Soldier of fortune or Soldier of Fortune may refer to:

- Mercenary, sometimes known as a soldier of fortune

== Film ==
- Soldier of Fortune (1955 film), starring Clark Gable and Susan Hayward
- Soldier of Fortune (1976 film), an Italian film starring Bud Spencer
- Laser Mission, a 1990 film also titled Soldier of Fortune, featuring Brandon Lee and Ernest Borgnine
- Soldiers of Fortune (1914 film) with Dustin Farnum
- Soldiers of Fortune (1919 film), a lost American silent drama
- Soldiers of Fortune (2012 film), an action comedy starring Sean Bean, Ving Rhames and Christian Slater

== Television ==
- Soldier of Fortune, Inc., a 1997–1998 television show (later renamed Special Ops Force)
- Soldiers of Fortune (TV series), a 1955 television series
- Soldier of Fortune (1982 TV series), a TVB television series

== Video games ==
- Soldier of Fortune (video game), a 2000 first-person shooter game created by Raven Software
  - Soldier of Fortune II: Double Helix, 2002 sequel
  - Soldier of Fortune: Payback, 2007 sequel
- The Chaos Engine, a 1993 action game, sold as Soldiers of Fortune in the United States
- Soldier of Fortune, a Commodore 64 game
- Soldier of Fortune, a ZX Spectrum game

== Literature ==
- Soldiers of Fortune, an 1897 novel by Richard Harding Davis
- Soldier of Fortune, a 2003 biography about Emil Lewis Holmdahl by Douglas V. Meed
- Soldier of Fortune (magazine), a magazine about warfare

== Music ==
=== Albums ===
- Soldiers of Fortune (album), a 1986 album by Outlaws
- Soldier of Fortune (Loudness album) a 1989 album by Loudness
- Soldier of Fortune (Eric Burdon album), a 1997 album by Eric Burdon

=== Songs ===
- "Soldier of Fortune" (Deep Purple song) (1974)
- "Soldier of Fortune" (John Paul Young song) (1983)
- "Soldier of Fortune", from Bad Reputation (1977) by Thin Lizzy
- "Soldier of Fortune", from I've Got the Rock'n'Rolls Again (1981) by The Joe Perry Project
- "Soldier of Fortune", from Bodies and Souls (1983) by The Manhattan Transfer
- "Soldier of Fortune", from Soldier of Fortune (1989) by Loudness
- "Soldiers of Fortune", from Unknown Soldier (2000) by Warmen
- "Soldier of Fortune", from End of Disclosure (2013) by Hypocrisy

== Other uses ==
- Soldier of Fortune (horse), 2007 Irish Derby winner
