= Rhythm of My Heart =

1991 single by Rod Stewart

Single by Rod Stewart

from the album Vagabond Heart
- B-side: "Moment of Glory"; "I Don't Want to Talk About It"
- Released: 4 March 1991
- Studio: Cherokee, Conway (Hollywood, California); Sarm (London, England)
- Length: 4:12
- Label: Warner Bros.
- Songwriters: Marc Jordan; John Capek
- Producer: Trevor Horn

Rod Stewart singles chronology
"It Takes Two" (1990)	"Rhythm of My Heart" (1991)	"The Motown Song" (1991)

"Rhythm of My Heart" is a song written by Marc Jordan and John Capek that was first recorded by Dutch rock and roll artist René Shuman, included on his 1986 self-titled debut album. In 1991, British singer Rod Stewart recorded the song for his sixteenth album, Vagabond Heart (1991), with production by Trevor Horn. It is the album's opening track and was released as its second single on 4 March 1991 by Warner.

Stewart's version reached No. 3 on the UK Singles Chart, No. 5 on the US Billboard Hot 100, and No. 1 on the Canadian and Irish charts. The melody is an adaptation of "Loch Lomond". The meter, stanzas and lyrics are also based on the poem. The Great Highland bagpipes feature during Stewart's version.

== Track listings ==
- 7-inch single
1. "Rhythm of My Heart" – 4:12
2. "Moment of Glory" – 4:37
- 12-inch single
1. "Rhythm of My Heart" – 4:12
2. "Moment of Glory" – 4:37
3. "I Don't Want to Talk About It" (newly recorded) – 4:49
- CD maxi – Europe
1. "Rhythm of My Heart" – 4:12
2. "Moment of Glory" – 4:37
3. "I Don't Want to Talk About It" (newly recorded) – 4:49

== Credits and personnel ==
Credits are lifted from the Vagabond Heart album booklet.

Studios

- Recorded at Cherokee Studio, Conway Studio (Hollywood, California), and Sarm Studio (London, England)
- Mastered at Precision Mastering (Los Angeles)

Personnel

- Marc Jordan – writing
- John Capek – writing
- Joe Turano – backing vocals, choir director
- Arnold Stiefel – backing vocals
- Gary Falcone – backing vocals
- Jerry Cook – backing vocals
- John Batdorf – backing vocals
- Lionel Conway – backing vocals
- Randel Crenshaw – backing vocals
- Robert Jason – backing vocals
- Roger Freeland – backing vocals
- Robin Le Mesurier – guitars
- Steve Lukather – guitars
- Neil Stubenhaus – bass guitar
- Gary Maughan – Fairlight programming
- Kevin Savigar – keyboards, string arrangement and conducting
- Richard Cottle – keyboards
- Michael MacNeil – squeezebox
- Kevin Weed – bagpipes
- John Robinson – drums
- Nick Strimple – choir director
- Trevor Horn – production, mixing
- Steve Macmillan – mixing, engineering
- Stephen Marcussen – mastering

== Charts ==
=== Weekly charts ===
Chart (1991)	Peak position
Australia (ARIA)	2
Austria (Ö3 Austria Top 40)	5
Belgium (Ultratop 50 Flanders)	10
Canada Top Singles (RPM)	1
Canada Adult Contemporary (RPM)	1
Denmark (IFPI)	9
Europe (Eurochart Hot 100)	7
Europe (European Hit Radio)	1
France (SNEP)	20
Germany (GfK)	4
Ireland (IRMA)	1
Luxembourg (Radio Luxembourg)	1
Netherlands (Dutch Top 40)	18
Netherlands (Single Top 100)	21
New Zealand (Recorded Music NZ)	6
Sweden (Sverigetopplistan)	17
Switzerland (Schweizer Hitparade)	9
UK Singles (Official Charts)	3
UK Airplay (Music Week)	1
US Billboard Hot 100	5
US Adult Contemporary (Billboard)	2
US Mainstream Rock (Billboard)	13
US Cash Box Top 100	9
Zimbabwe (ZIMA)	7

=== Year-end charts ===
Chart (1991)	Position
Australia (ARIA)	13
Austria (Ö3 Austria Top 40)	29
Belgium (Ultratop)	80
Canada Top Singles (RPM)	4
Canada Adult Contemporary (RPM)	4
Europe (Eurochart Hot 100)	26
Europe (European Hit Radio)	2
Germany (Media Control)	16
New Zealand (RIANZ)	38
Sweden (Topplistan)	62
Switzerland (Schweizer Hitparade)	20
UK Singles (OCC)	34
US Billboard Hot 100	50
US Adult Contemporary (Billboard)	12
US Cash Box Top 100	10

== Certifications ==
Region	Certification	Certified units/sales
Australia (ARIA)	Gold	35,000^{^}
New Zealand (RMNZ)	Gold	15,000^{‡}
United Kingdom (BPI)	Silver	200,000^{^}
^{^} Shipments figures based on certification alone.^{‡} Sales+streaming figures based on certification alone.

== Release history ==
Region	Date	Format(s)	Label(s)	Ref.
United Kingdom	4 March 1991	7-inch vinyl; 12-inch vinyl; CD; cassette	Warner Bros.	
Australia	8 April 1991	7-inch vinyl; 12-inch vinyl; CD; cassette	Warner Bros.	
Japan	25 April 1991	Mini-CD	Warner Bros.	

== Covers ==
"Rhythm of My Heart" was also covered by Runrig, who released it as a single in 1996. This is the version heard on the Loch Ness soundtrack when it was released on CD in 2005, instead of Stewart's version heard in the film.

== In popular culture ==
Stewart's version of the song was used during the closing credits of the 1996 family film Loch Ness. The single was also used in the 2000 film The Perfect Storm. "Rhythm of My Heart" was played at the British farewell ceremony in Hong Kong in 1997.
