= One Foot in Front =

Studio album by John Paul Young
- Released: March 1984
- Recorded: Horus Sound Studios, Hannover, West Germany, Union Studios, Munich, West Germany, Bodifications Inc, Los Angeles, USA, AAV, Melbourne, Australia, Albert Studio 2, Sydney, Australia
- Genre: Synth-pop
- Length: 36:32
- Label: I.C. Records
- Producer: John Capek

John Paul Young chronology
The Singer (1981)	One Foot in Front (1984)	Classic Hits (1988)

Singles from One Foot in Front
- 1. "Soldier of Fortune" Released: October 1983; 2. "War Games" Released: March 1984; 3. "L.A. Sunset" Released: July 1984; 4. "Call the Night" Released: November 1984

One Foot in Front is the seventh studio album by Australian pop singer John Paul Young, released in March 1984. The album spawned four singles, "Soldier of Fortune" in 1983, and "War Games", "L.A. Sunset" and "Call the Night" in 1984. For European release in 1984, the album was titled Soldier of Fortune, and for re-release in 1992 it was renamed War Games. It is the first Young album to not feature Vanda & Young as producers.

In 1992, the album was remastered and released on CD with seven additional bonus tracks.

== Overview ==
In 1983, Young signed to the Australian branch of German label I.C. Records. He flew to Germany with producer, composer and keyboard player John Capek to record a new album. Additional sessions were in Los Angeles, Melbourne and Sydney.

== Track listing ==
Side one

No.	Title	Writer(s)	Length
1.	"War Games"	John Capek, Marc Jordan	3:34
2.	"She Made a Fool Out of You"	Frank Howson, John Capek	3:46
3.	"System Overload"	John Capek, Marc Jordan	4:04
4.	"Call the Night"	Frank Howson, John Capek, John Paul Young	3:19
5.	"Soldier of Fortune"	John Capek, Marc Jordan	4:24

Side two

No.	Title	Writer(s)	Length
1.	"Cryin' Eyes"	John Paul Young, Warren Morgan	3:50
2.	"Body Heat"	John Capek, Leslie Smith, Marc Jordan	3:46
3.	"Love Is for Heroes"	Frank Howson, John Capek	3:42
4.	"Television Girl"	John Capek, Marc Jordan	4:34
5.	"L.A. Sunset"	Frank Howson, John Capek	3:33

1992 bonus tracks

No.	Title	Writer(s)	Length
1.	"The Sirens"	John Paul Young, Warren Morgan	4:05
2.	"War Games (instrumental)"	John Capek, Marc Jordan	3:49
3.	"Blues Singer (previously unreleased)"	Alex Burns	3:59
4.	"Pasadena (previously unreleased)"	David Hemmings, George Young, Harry Vanda	3:47
5.	"Down on Down on Down (previously unreleased)"	Beeb Birtles, Frank Howson	3:59
6.	"Soldier of Fortune (Extended Mix)"	John Capek, Marc Jordan	5:10
7.	"War Games (Extended Mix)"	John Capek, Marc Jordan	5:44

== Personnel ==
John Paul Young and the All Star Band

- Arranged by [horns] – Bill Shepherd
- John Paul Young - vocals
- John Capek - keyboards, synthesizer
- Steve McDonnell - didgeridoo
- Alex Conti - guitar
- Mark Punch - guitar
- Russell Dunlop - percussion, backing vocals)
- Veronica Lee - backing vocals
- Wendy Matthews - backing vocals
- Marc Jordan - backing vocals
- Warren Morgan - keyboards [additional]
- The Munich Horns - horns

Producer – John Capek (tracks: 1 to 10, 12 to 17), John Paul Young (tracks: 11), Warren Morgan (tracks: 11) Notes: Originally recorded in 1983 between Europe and Australia and issued as "One Foot in Front". Tracks 11 and 16 are taken from the 12" single "Soldier of Fortune" released in 1983. Tracks 12 and 17 are taken from the 12" maxi-single "War Games" released in 1984.
