= Soldier of Fortune (John Paul Young song) =

Single by John Paul Young

from the album One Foot in Front
- Released: 1983
- Genre: Synth-pop
- Length: 3:58 (single edit); 4:34 (album version); 5:09 (extended version)
- Label: Innovative Communication/I.C. Records
- Songwriter(s): John Capek, Marc Jordan
- Producer(s): John Capek

John Paul Young singles chronology
"Oh No No" (1982)	"Soldier of Fortune" (1983)	"War Games" (1984)

"Soldier of Fortune" is a song written by John Capek and Marc Jordan, and first released by the Manhattan Transfer on their 1983 album Bodies and Souls. Australian pop singer John Paul Young released his version in October 1983 as the lead single from his seventh studio album One Foot in Front (1984). The song peaked at number 17 on the Australian Kent Music Report and stayed on the chart for 19 weeks.

The song gained further prominence when it was picked as the theme song for the 1984 Disabled Olympics held in New York, and it also went on to be a hit in Germany.

== Track listing ==
1. "Soldier of Fortune" (John Capek, Marc Jordan) – 4:34
2. "The Sirens" (John Paul Young, Warren Morgan) – 4:06
3. "Soldier of Fortune" (J. Capek, M. Jordan) (Extended) – 5:09

== Personnel ==
- Rick Lewis – cover
- SNB – mastering
- Tony Beuttel – engineer, mixing, producer (track 2)
- Mike Stavrou – engineer
- John Capek – producer (track 1)
- John Paul Young – producer (track 2)
- Warren Morgan – producer (track 2)

== Charts ==
Chart (1983)	Peak position
Australian (Kent Music Report)	17

== Other recordings ==
Co-writer of the song Marc Jordan released two of his own versions of the song, one on the soundtrack album of the film Youngblood and another, featuring a slower arrangement, on his 1987 album Talking Through Pictures.
