= Meerssen =

Meerssen Meersje (Limburgish)
- Municipality and town
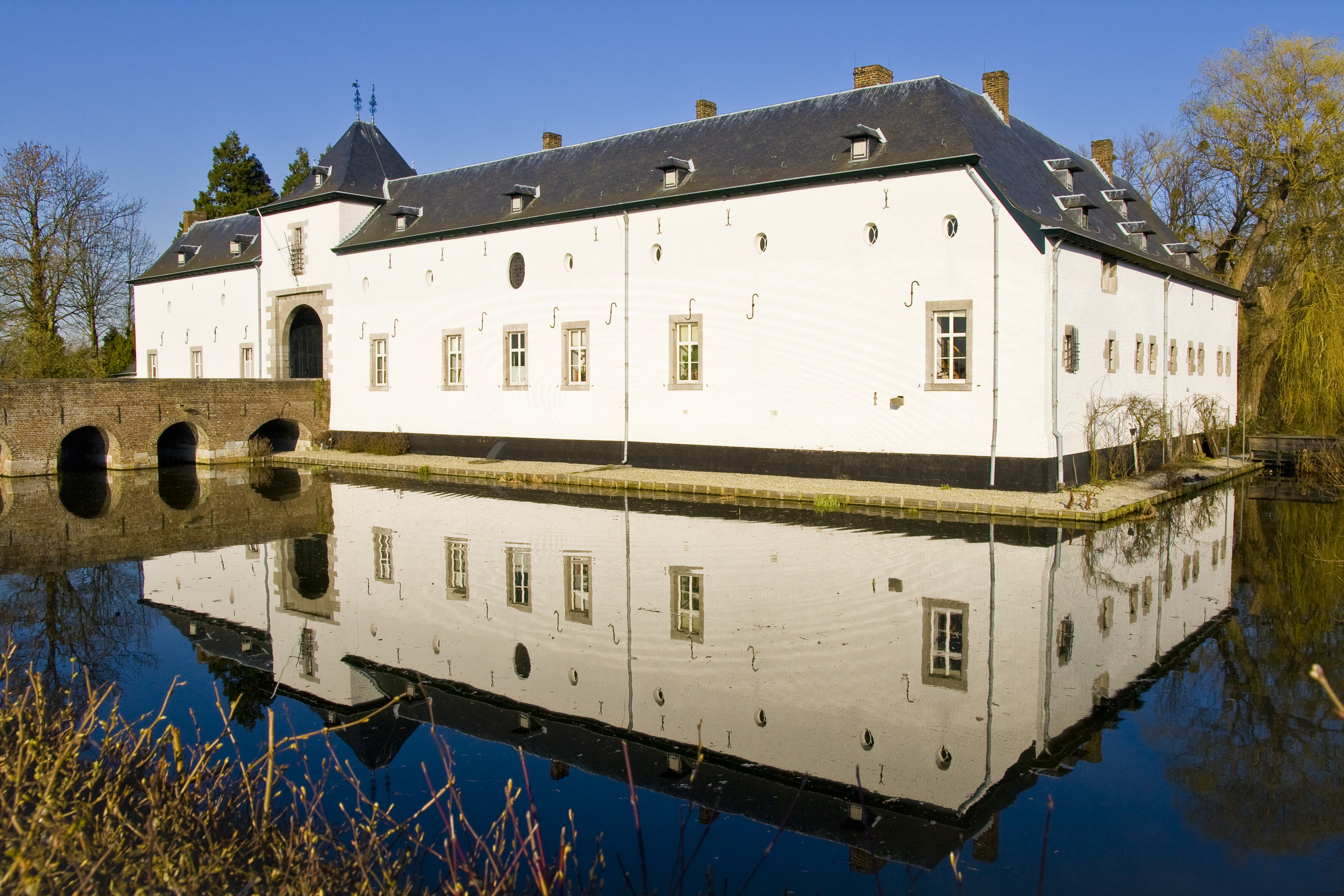
- Geulle Castle

- Flag Coat of arms

- Location in Limburg
- Coordinates: 50°53′N 5°45′E
- Country: Netherlands
- Province: Limburg

Government
  - Body: Municipal council
  - Mayor: Mirjam Clermonts-Aretz (VVD)

Area
  - Total: 27.70 km^{2} (10.70 sq mi)
  - Land: 26.96 km^{2} (10.41 sq mi)
  - Water: 0.74 km^{2} (0.29 sq mi)
- Elevation: 57 m (187 ft)

Population (January 2021)
  - Total: 18,661
  - Density: 692/km^{2} (1,790/sq mi)
- Demonym: Meerssenaar
- Time zone: UTC+1 (CET)
  - Summer (DST): UTC+2 (CEST)
- Postcode: 6230–6243
- Area code: 043
- Website: www.meerssen.nl

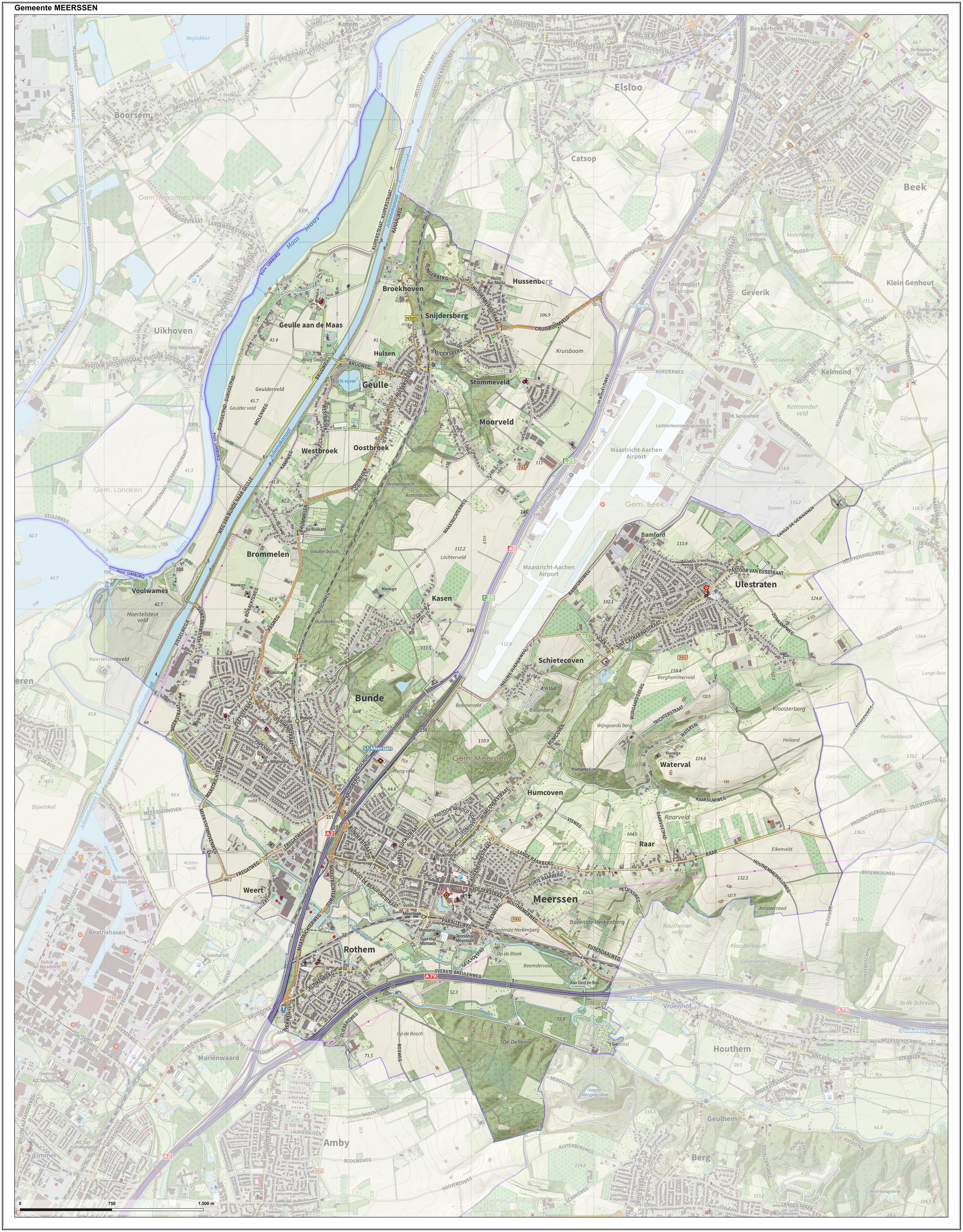
Dutch Topographic map of Meerssen, June 2015

Meerssen (Dutch: [ˈmeːrsə(n)]; Limburgish: Meersje [ˈmeːʀʃə]) is a town and a municipality in southeastern Netherlands.

== History ==
The Treaty of Meerssen was signed in Meerssen in 870. The Treaty of Meerssen was an agreement of the division of the Carolingian Empire by the surviving sons of Louis I: Charles II of the West Franks and Louis the German of the East Franks.

Around the middle of the 10th century the allodium Meerssen was the property of queen Gerberga, the daughter of king Henry I. She was the spouse of Louis IV of France. In 968 she donated all her property to the abbey of Saint Remigius in Reims.

== Population centres ==
- Bunde
- Geulle
- Meerssen
- Rothem
- Ulestraten

== Transportation ==
Railway station: Meerssen

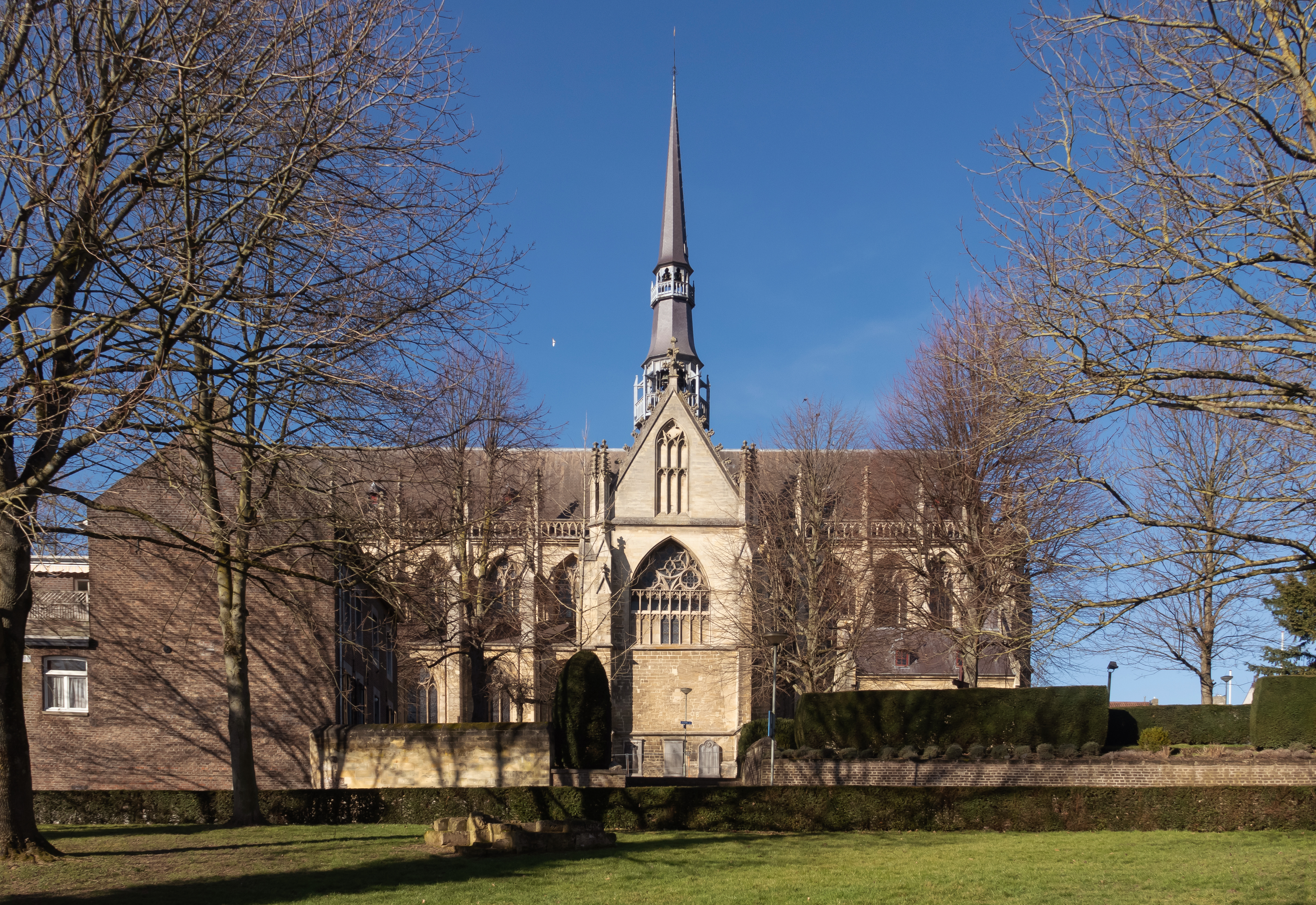
Basilica: Basiliek van het Heilig Sacrament, de Sint-Bartholomeusbasiliek

== International relations ==
=== Twin towns – sister cities ===
Meerssen is a founding member of the Douzelage, a town twinning association of 24 towns across the European Union. This active town twinning began in 1991 and there are regular events, such as a produce market from each of the other countries and festivals. Discussions regarding membership are also in hand with three further towns (Agros in Cyprus, Škofja Loka in Slovenia, and Tryavna in Bulgaria).

- Altea, Spain - 1991
- Bad Kötzting, Germany - 1991
- Bellagio, Italy - 1991
- (Republic of Ireland) Bundoran, Ireland - 1991
- Granville, France - 1991
- Holstebro, Denmark - 1991
- Houffalize, Belgium - 1991
- Meerssen, Netherlands - 1991
- Niederanven, Luxembourg - 1991
- Preveza, Greece - 1991
- Sesimbra, Portugal - 1991
- Sherborne, United Kingdom - 1991
- Karkkila, Finland - 1997
- Oxelösund, Sweden - 1998
- Judenburg, Austria - 1999
- Chojna, Poland - 2004
- Kőszeg, Hungary - 2004
- Sigulda, Latvia - 2004
- Sušice, Czech Republic - 2004
- Türi, Estonia - 2004
- Zvolen, Slovakia - 2007
- Rokiškis, Lithuania - 2018
- Marsaskala, Malta - 2009
- Siret, Romania - 2010
- Tryavna, Bulgaria - 2011

== Notable people ==
- Charles Eyck (1897 in Meerssen - 1983) a Dutch visual artist
- Hubert Levigne (1905 in Meerssen - 1989) a Dutch artist
- Gerard Kockelmans (1925 in Meerssen - 1965) a Dutch composer, conductor and music teacher
- Jef Lahaye (1932 in Bunde – 1990) a Dutch professional racing cyclist
- Maria van der Hoeven (born 1949 in Meerssen) a retired Dutch politician
- Erik Meijer (born 1969 in Meerssen) a retired Dutch footballer with 462 club caps
- Kyara Stijns (born 1995 in Bunde) a Dutch professional racing cyclist
- Ruben van Bommel (born 2004 in Meerssen) a Dutch professional football player

== Gallery ==
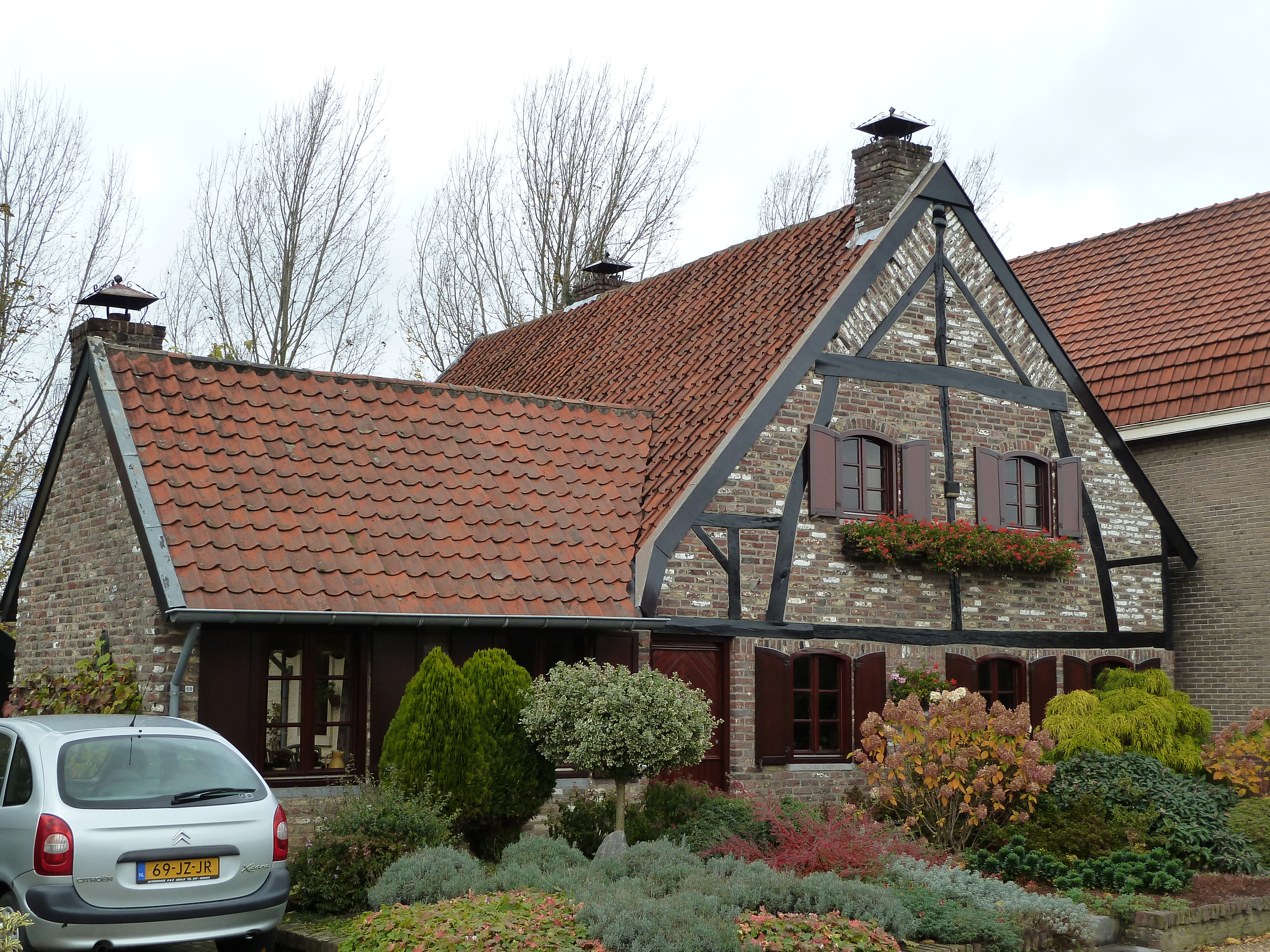
Geulle-Westbroek

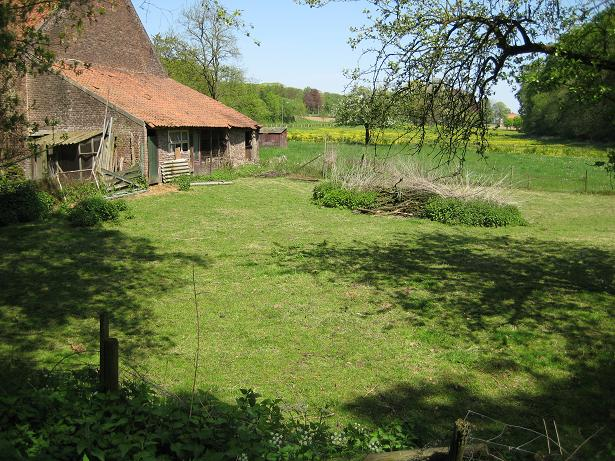
Old farm near Meerssen

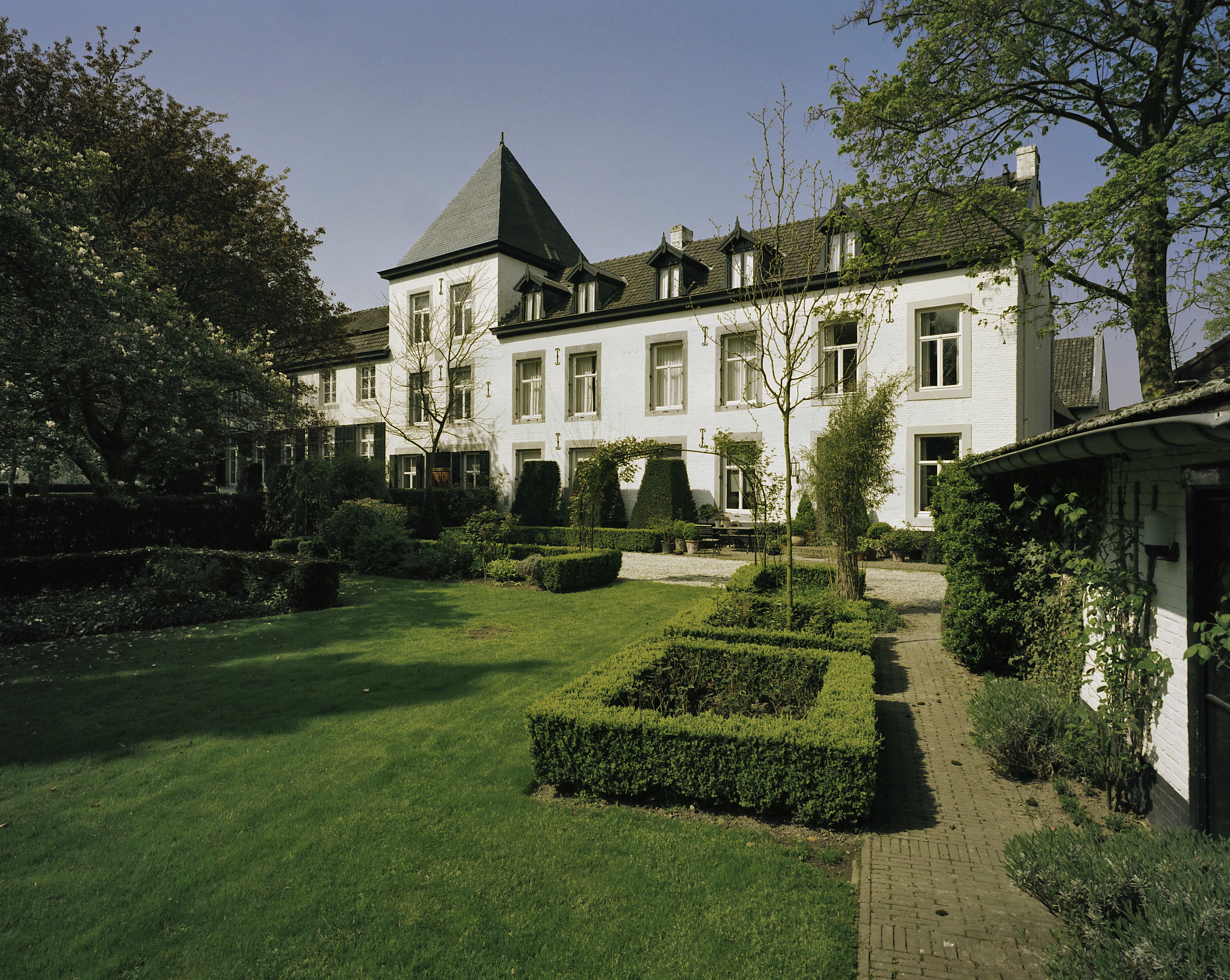
Overzicht van een der vleugels van de herenhof - Bunde

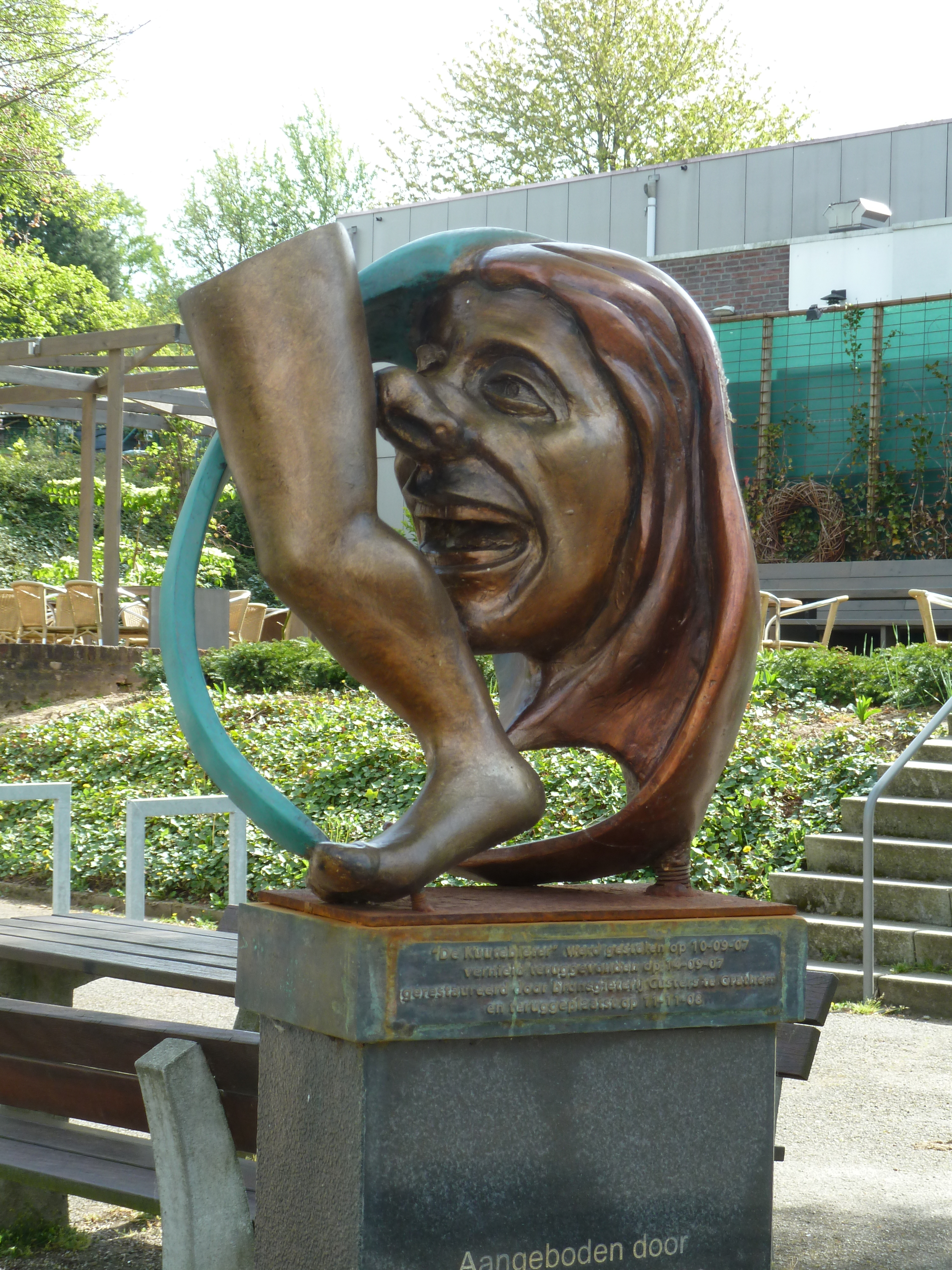
Ulestraten-De nar van Ulestraten

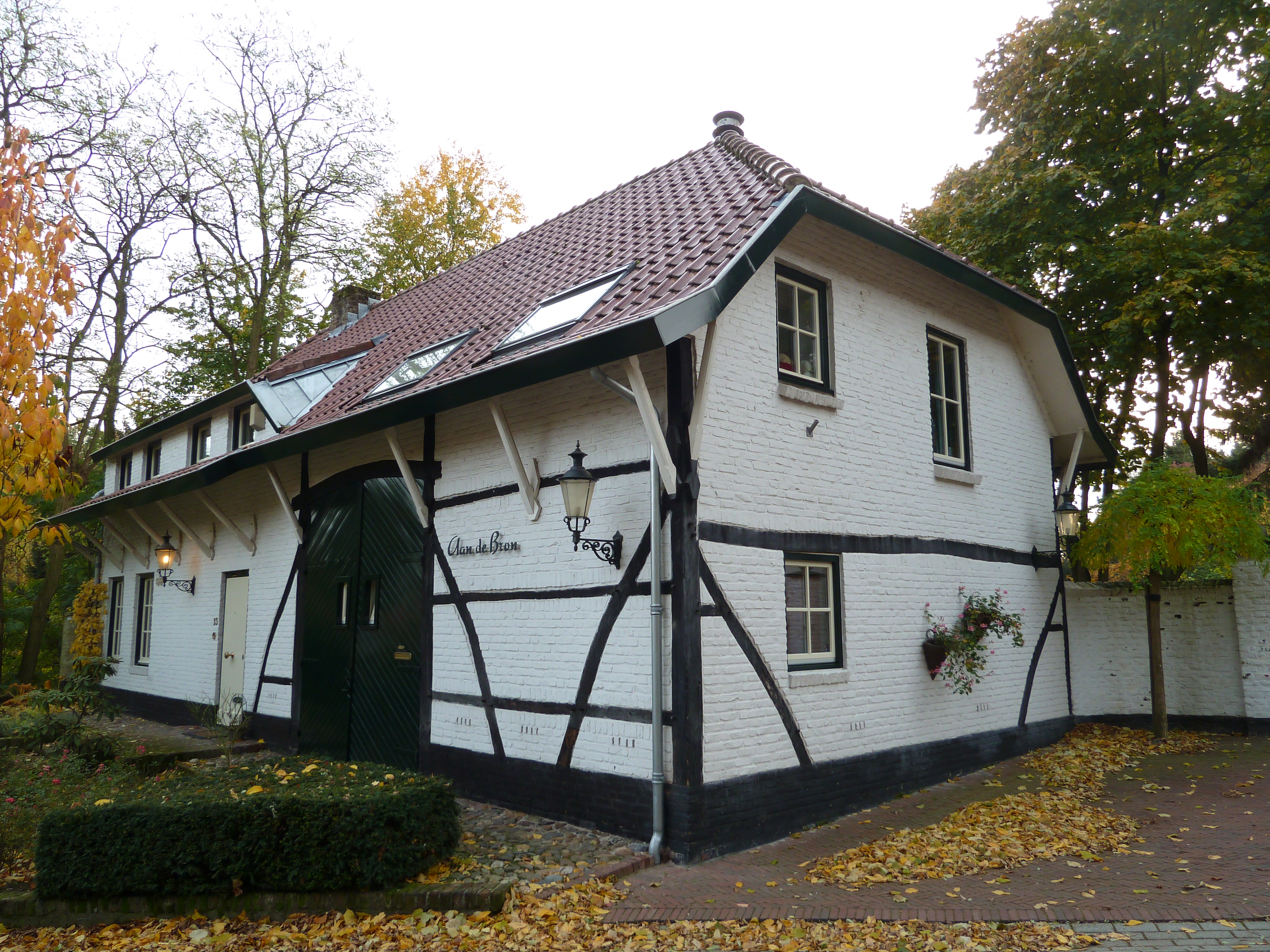
Ulestraten-Groot Berghem
