= Mecca for Moderns =

1981 studio album by the Manhattan Transfer

Studio album by the Manhattan Transfer
- Released: June 3, 1981
- Studios: Dawnbreaker Studio, San Francisco, California
- Genres: Vocal jazz, pop
- Length: 36:12
- Label: Atlantic
- Producer: Jay Graydon

The Manhattan Transfer chronology
Extensions (1979)	Mecca for Moderns (1981)	The Best of The Manhattan Transfer (1981)

Professional ratings
Review scores
Source	Rating
AllMusic	4.5/5 stars

Mecca for Moderns is the sixth studio album by the Manhattan Transfer. It was released in 1981 by Atlantic Records.

This album was the highest-charting album to date for the group, peaking on Billboard magazine's Top Pop Catalog Albums chart at No. 22. With this album, the Manhattan Transfer became the first group to win Grammy Awards in both the pop and jazz categories in the same year.

== Awards ==
The song "The Boy from New York City" became their first top 10 hit, reaching number 7 on Billboard Magazine's Hot 100 chart. This song also won the group the Grammy for Best Pop Performance by a Duo or Group With Vocals.

The song "Until I Met You (Corner Pocket)" also earned them a Grammy for Best Jazz Vocal Performance, Duo or Group.

The song "A Nightingale Sang in Berkeley Square" which was arranged by Gene Puerling, won the Grammy Best Vocal Arrangement for Two or More Voices.

The song "Spies in the Night", which incorporates the "James Bond Theme", also charted on Billboard Magazine's Bubbling Under chart, peaking at number 103.

== Album name ==
According to Tim Hauser, he picked up the name for this album from a Duke Ellington album entitled Live at the Blue Note 1952. "While reading the cover, he noticed it said 'The Blue Note was a haven for the smart set, in fact, the real mecca for moderns.' The group liked the phrase, and it fit well with the album concept."

== Track listing ==
No.	Title	Writer(s)	Length
1.	"On the Boulevard"	Richard Page, Jay Graydon, Marc Jordan	4:08
2.	"The Boy from New York City"	George Davis, John T. Taylor	3:40
3.	"(Wanted) Dead or Alive"	Art DeCoteau, Slinger Francisco	3:27
4.	"Spies in the Night"	Alan Paul, David Foster, Jay Graydon	3:59
5.	"Smile Again"	Bill Champlin, David Foster, Jay Graydon, Alan Paul	4:33
6.	"Until I Met You (Corner Pocket)"	Freddie Green, Don Wolf	5:17
7.	"(The Word of) Confirmation"	Charlie Parker	3:14
8.	"Kafka"	Bernard Kafka, Jay Graydon	4:08
9.	"A Nightingale Sang in Berkeley Square"	Eric Maschwitz, Manning Sherwin	3:46
Total length:			36:12

== Personnel ==
=== The Manhattan Transfer ===
- Cheryl Bentyne – vocals
- Tim Hauser – vocals
- Alan Paul – vocals, vocal arrangement (2, 4)
- Janis Siegel – vocals, vocal arrangement (6)

=== Musicians ===
- Victor Feldman – Fender Rhodes (1), acoustic piano (1)
- Jay Graydon – synthesizers (1, 3), guitar (1–4, 8), arrangements (1, 3, 5, 8), horn arrangements (2), rhythm arrangements (2, 4, 6), vocal arrangements (4, 6)
- David Foster – acoustic piano (2, 4, 5), keyboards (5), synthesizers (5)
- Greg Mathieson – organ (3), synthesizers (3)
- Michael Boddicker – synthesizers (4, 8)
- Yaron Gershovsky – acoustic piano (6, 8)
- Milcho Leviev – acoustic piano (7, 8), arrangements (7)
- Steve George – synthesizers (8)
- Steve Lukather – guitar (1, 4, 5)
- Dean Parks – guitar (2, 8)
- Al Viola – guitar (6)
- Abraham Laboriel – bass (1–8)
- Steve Gadd – drums (1, 3–8)
- Mike Baird – drums (2)
- Alex Acuña – percussion (3)
- Andy Narell – cowbell (3), steel drums (3)
- Don Roberts – saxophone (2)
- Tom Scott – saxophone (3), Lyricon (3)
- Richie Cole – saxophone (7)
- Jerry Hey – trumpet (2)
- Bernard Kafka – arrangements (8)
- Gene Puerling – arrangements (9)
- Jon Hendricks – scatting (7)

=== Production ===
- Producer, Remix – Jay Graydon
- Engineer – Joseph Bogan
- Assistant Engineers – Bob Bullock and Deborah Thompson
- Recorded at Dawnbreaker Studios (San Fernando, CA).
- Overdubbed and Mixed at Garden Rake Studios (Studio City, CA).
- Mastered by Bernie Grundman at A&M Studios (Hollywood, CA).
- Musical Contractor – Frank DeCaro
- Art Direction – Steve Arnold, Richard DeGussie and Sarah Richardson.
- Photography – Steve Arnold
