= Bodies and Souls =

Studio album by The Manhattan Transfer
- Released: September 1983
- Studios: Sunset Sound (Hollywood, California)
- Genres: Vocal jazz, pop, R&B
- Length: 42:40
- Label: Atlantic
- Producers: Richard Rudolph and The Manhattan Transfer (tracks 1–7, 9, 10 & 11); Tim Hauser and Greg Mathieson (track 8).

The Manhattan Transfer chronology
The Best of The Manhattan Transfer (1981)	Bodies and Souls (1983)	Bop Doo-Wopp (1984)

Professional ratings
Review scores
Source	Rating
AllMusic	link

Bodies and Souls is the seventh studio album by The Manhattan Transfer, released in September 1983 on the Atlantic Records label.

This album took the Manhattan Transfer in a different direction from their previous releases, offering a new, revised style of their music. There were several collaborations on this album, including with Stevie Wonder, Rod Temperton, and Jeremy Lubbock. Frankie Valli appears as a guest artist on the song "American Pop".

The final track on the album, "The Night That Monk Returned to Heaven", is a tribute to American jazz pianist Thelonious Monk.

Alan Paul co-wrote two songs on the album, "Malaise En Malaisie" and "Code of Ethics".

Both "Spice of Life" and "Mystery" were written by Rod Temperton and Derek Bramble and originally recorded by Michael Jackson for his Thriller album in 1982.

== Charts ==
This album was the first Manhattan Transfer album to be included in the Rhythm & Blues charts. The song "Spice of Life" was a hit on both the R&B chart, reaching #32, and on the Pop chart, reaching #40. This song featured a distinctive harmonica solo by Stevie Wonder. The song, written by Rod Temperton and Derek Bramble of Heatwave, has a similar structure to the Temperton-penned album cut "Baby Be Mine" on Michael Jackson's 1982 Thriller album.

The song "Mystery", also written by Rod Temperton, reached #80 on the R&B chart and #102 on the Pop chart. The song was later covered by Anita Baker on her 1986 album Rapture. "This Independence", written by Canadian composer Marc Jordan (famous for "Living In Marina Del Rey"), was also released on a 12" disco single.

== Awards ==
The group won a Grammy Award for "Why Not!" in the category of Best Jazz Vocal Performance, Duo or Group.

== Track listing ==
Side one: "Bodies"
No.	Title	Writer(s)	Length
1.	"Spice of Life"	Derek Bramble, Rod Temperton	3:40
2.	"This Independence"	John Capek, Marc Jordan	5:01
3.	"Mystery"	Rod Temperton	5:00
4.	"American Pop"	John Capek, Marc Jordan	3:34
5.	"Soldier of Fortune"	John Capek, Marc Jordan	4:21

Side two: "Souls"
No.	Title	Writer(s)	Length
6.	"Code of Ethics"	Wayne Johnson, Alan Paul, Randy Waldman	5:06
7.	"Malaise En Malaisie"	Alain Chamfort, Serge Gainsbourg, Alan Paul	3:58
8.	"Down South Camp Meetin'"	Fletcher Henderson, Jon Hendricks, Irving Mills	3:00
9.	"Why Not! (Manhattan Carnival)"	Michel Camilo, Julie Elgenberg, Hilary Koski	2:33
10.	"Goodbye Love"	Jeremy Lubbock, Richard Rudolph	3:04
11.	"The Night That Monk Returned to Heaven"	Robert Kraft	3:23
Total length:			42:40

== Personnel ==
The Manhattan Transfer

- Cheryl Bentyne – vocals, vocal clarinet solo (8)
- Tim Hauser – vocals, vocal arrangement (2, 5)
- Alan Paul – vocals, vocal arrangement (4–7)
- Janis Siegel – vocals, vocal arrangement (4, 8–9)

Musicians

- Larry Williams – Rhodes (1), saxophone (1–2, 4, 9), keyboards (2, 4), synthesizers (2–5), bass (2, 4), instrumental arrangements (2, 4, 5), horn arrangements (2)
- Casey Young – synthesizer programming (1–4, 7)
- Michael Boddicker – synthesizers (3), synthesizer programming (3)
- Greg Phillinganes – Fender Rhodes (3), synthesizers (3)
- J. Peter Robinson – synthesizers (4)
- Yaron Gershovsky – acoustic piano (5), keyboards (7, 9), synthesizers (7), instrumental arrangements (7, 9)
- Randy Waldman – acoustic piano (6), synthesizers (6), instrumental arrangements (6)
- John Erdsvoog – synthesizer programming (6)
- Greg Mathieson – acoustic piano (8)
- Kevin Clark – guitar (1), wind chimes (11)
- David Williams – guitar (1–4)
- Wayne Johnson – guitar (5–7, 9)
- Neil Stubenhaus – bass (1)
- Nathan East – bass (3, 6)
- Alex Blake – bass (5, 7, 9)
- Abraham Laboriel – bass (8)
- John Robinson – drums (1, 3, 6)
- Jeff Porcaro – drums (2, 4), Simmons drums (4)
- Art Rodriguez – drums (5, 7, 9)
- Carlos Vega – drums (8)
- Paulinho da Costa – percussion (1, 5, 9)
- Brian Avnet – handclaps (4)
- Richard Rudolph – handclaps (4)
- Stevie Wonder – harmonica solo (1)
- June Kiramoto – koto (7)
- Ernie Watts – saxophone (1), alto sax solo (3)
- Gary Herbig – saxophone (9)
- Bill Reichenbach Jr. – trombone (1–2, 9)
- Charles Loper – trombone (9)
- Gary Grant – trumpet (1–2, 9)
- Jerry Hey – trumpet (1–2), horn arrangements (1, 9)
- Chuck Findley – trumpet (9)
- Rod Temperton – instrumental arrangements (1, 3), horn arrangements (1), vocal arrangements (1, 3)
- Jeremy Lubbock – string arrangements and conductor (6, 10–11), Rhodes (10–11), instrumental arrangements (11)
- Gerard Vinci – concertmaster (6, 10–11)
- Frankie Valli – guest vocals (4)
- Erin Clark – "God's voice" and giggles (11)

Production

- Producers – Richard Rudolph and The Manhattan Transfer (tracks 1–7, 9–11); Tim Hauser and Greg Mathieson (track 8).
- Engineers – Kevin Clark (tracks 1–7, 9–11); David Leonard (track 8).
- Second engineers – Steve Bates, Gary Boatner, Joe Borga, Rick Butz, Benny Faccone and David Glover.
- Recorded at Westlake Studios, Sunset Sound and Boddifications (Los Angeles, CA); United Western Recorders, Baby 'O Recorders and T.A.P.E. Recorders (Hollywood, CA).
- Mixed by Kevin Clark at A&M Studios (Hollywood, CA) and Baby 'O Recorders.
- Mastered by Bernie Grundman at A&M Studios.
- Production coordination – John Cutcliffe
- Management coordination – Marsha Loeb
- Art Direction and design – Fayette Hauser
- Management – Brian Avnet
