= Angel-Eye =

Dutch singer-songwriter (born 1974)

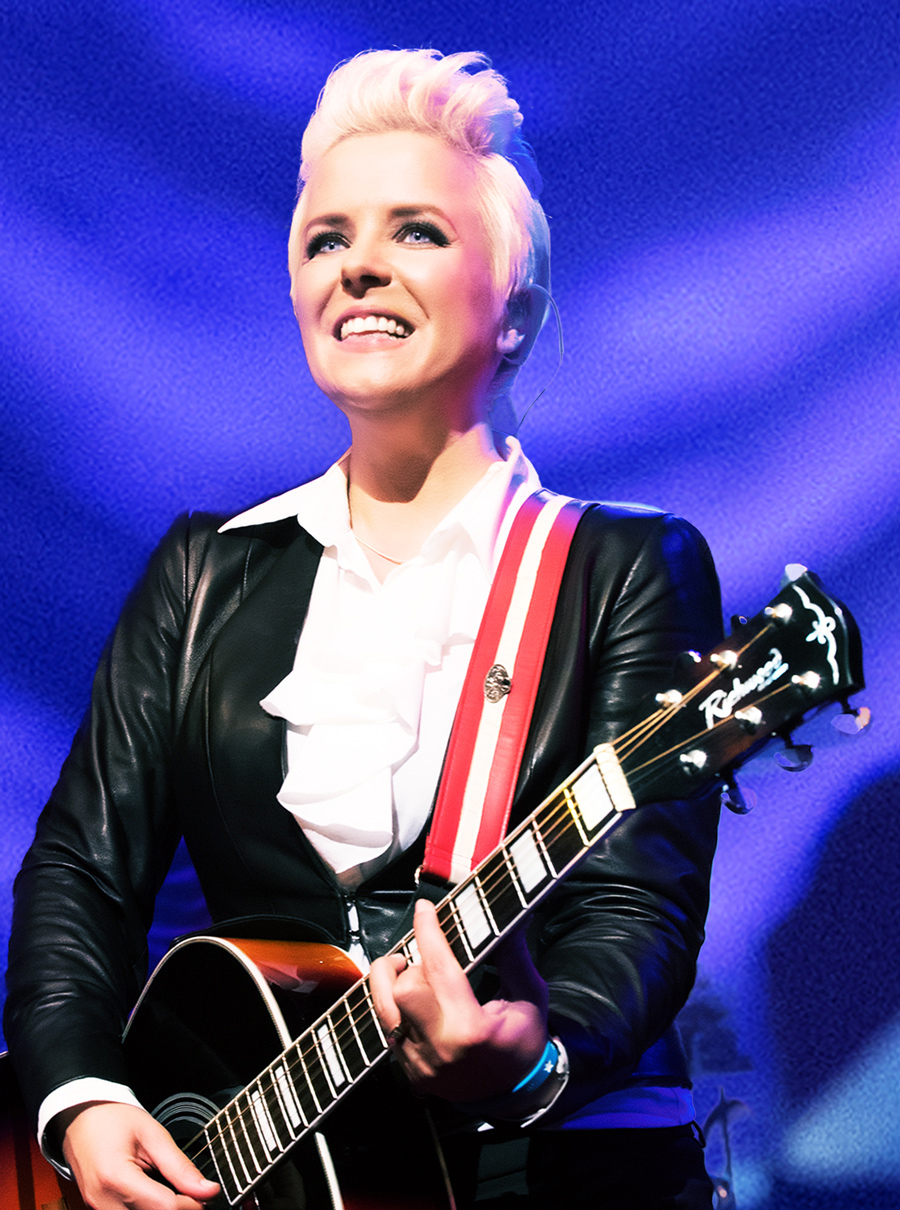
- Angel-Eye

Background information
- Born: Angela Brouwers; 11 September 1974 (age 52); Bunde, Netherlands
- Genres: Country; rock and roll; pop; dance
- Occupations: Singer, composer, record producer
- Instruments: Piano; guitar; saxophone
- Years active: 1994–present
- Spouse: René Shuman (m. 2010)

Angela Shuman (née Brouwers; born 11 September 1974), known professionally as Angel-Eye, is a Dutch singer, composer and record producer. Around 2000 she wrote music for commercials and for Belgian artists. Since 2003 she has performed with René Shuman as the duo Shuman & Angel-Eye.

== Early life and education ==
As a child, Brouwers played the saxophone in a local wind band and the guitar in pop bands. She studied piano with the jazz pianist Frank Giebels at the Conservatorium Maastricht. She entered the conservatory at seventeen, and a year later set up her own studio and production company, AudioNet.

== Career ==
=== Advertising music ===
With AudioNet she wrote music for radio and television commercials, including campaigns for Arke, Profiel de Fietsspecialist, Sony and Rabobank. With Shuman she composed the music for an Audi television commercial that was also broadcast outside the Netherlands.

=== Belgium ===
In Belgium she collaborated with Kim Kay, co-writing "Les vacances d'été" that reached number 18 in the charts, and working on DJ Peter's The Party Plane that reached number 6. She signed with EMI as the singer of Tiger Tiger, a Belgian project for which Guy Chambers, the regular songwriter of Robbie Williams, wrote the song I'm So High. The single entered the High Rotation Top 30 of the music channel TMF.

Her stage name came from her website, where Angel refers to her first name, and Eye to the world she showed there through her own eyes. She calls herself a "virtual artist".

=== Shuman & Angel-Eye ===
In 2000 Shuman got in touch with her after seeing her in a television documentary. They worked together on his album Set the Clock on Rock and have performed as a duo since 2003. Their version of "Don't Be Cruel" reached number 13 on the Dutch Top 40 that year. In 2004 the weekly magazine Margriet ran a four-page feature on her work as a composer, producer and performer.

The duo mainly performs rock and roll, including many songs by Elvis Presley, and has held memorial concerts for him since 2003. In October 2017, forty years after Presley's death, Omroep MAX broadcast their memorial show Elvis & More as a part of its series Max Muziekspecials, with guest list including Shuman & Angel-Eye and Lee Towers. Two more specials followed on MAX in 2018. The duo also appeared on such television programmes as TROS Muziekfeest op het ijs (2007), Omroepfeest (2011) and MAX's Tinekeshow.

In 2020, together with students of Maastricht University, the duo took part in the first AI Song Contest, an initiative of VPRO and NPO 3FM. Their entry, I Write A Song, was created with the help of artificial intelligence.

== Personal life ==
Angel-Eye married René Shuman in Hawaii on 14 February 2010.

== Charts ==
Year	Title	Artist	Dutch Top 40	Single Top 100
2003	"Don't Be Cruel"	Shuman & Angel-Eye	13	12
2006	"Magic Ride"	René Shuman & Angel-Eye	–	20
