= Bunde, Limburg =

Bunde Bung
- Village
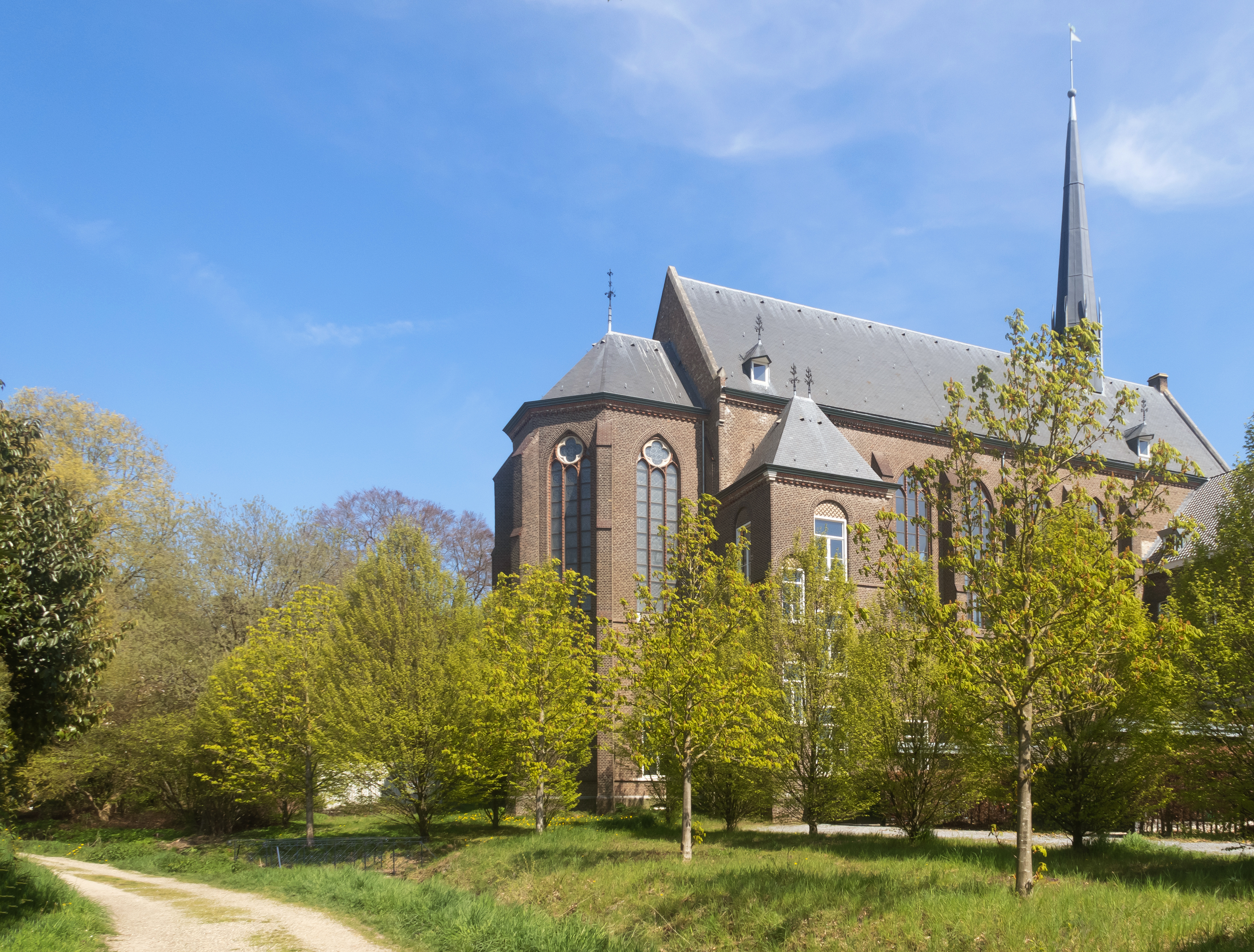
- Country house: Huize Overbunde

- Coat of arms

- Location in the Netherlands Location in the province of Limburg in the Netherlands
- Coordinates: 50°53′45″N 5°43′59″E
- Country: Netherlands
- Province: Limburg
- Municipality: Meerssen

Area
  - Total: 3.67 km^{2} (1.42 sq mi)
- Elevation: 47 m (154 ft)

Population (2021)
  - Total: 5,230
  - Density: 1,430/km^{2} (3,690/sq mi)
- Time zone: UTC+1 (CET)
  - Summer (DST): UTC+2 (CEST)
- Postal code: 6241
- Dialing code: 043

Bunde (Dutch pronunciation: [ˈbʏndə]; Limburgish: Bung [ˈbʏŋ]) is a village in the Dutch province of Limburg. It is located in the municipality of Meerssen, about 2 km northwest of Meerssen itself.

== History ==
The village was first mentioned in 893 as Bundende. The etymology is unclear. Bunde developed on the eastern flank of the Maas Valley. It used to belong to the Land van Valkenburg. In 1626, it became an independent heerlijkheid. Between June 1814 until May 1815, it was part of Prussia, but awarded to the Kingdom of the Netherlands by the Congress of Vienna.

The Old St Agnes Church is a single aisled church with a double tower at the front. In 1714, the medieval church was replaced by the current church. The tower burnt down in 1822 after a lightning strike. The New St Agnes Church is an aisleless church with concrete tower built between 1959 and 1960.

Bunde was home to 386 people in 1840. It was a separate municipality until 1982, when it became part of the municipality Meerssen.

== Transportation ==
- Bunde railway station
- Bus services - 17, 52, 98

== Notable people ==
- Angel-Eye (born 1974), artist, composer and producer
- Willem Victor Bartholomeus (1825–1892), organist and composer
- Jef Lahaye (1932–1990), racing cyclist
- Jan Lambrichs (1915–1990), racing cyclist
- Godfried Pieters (born 1936), sculptor
- Manouk Pluis (born 1999), actress
- Kyara Stijns (born 1995), racing cyclist
- Pauline van de Ven (born 1956), writer and visual artist

== Gallery ==
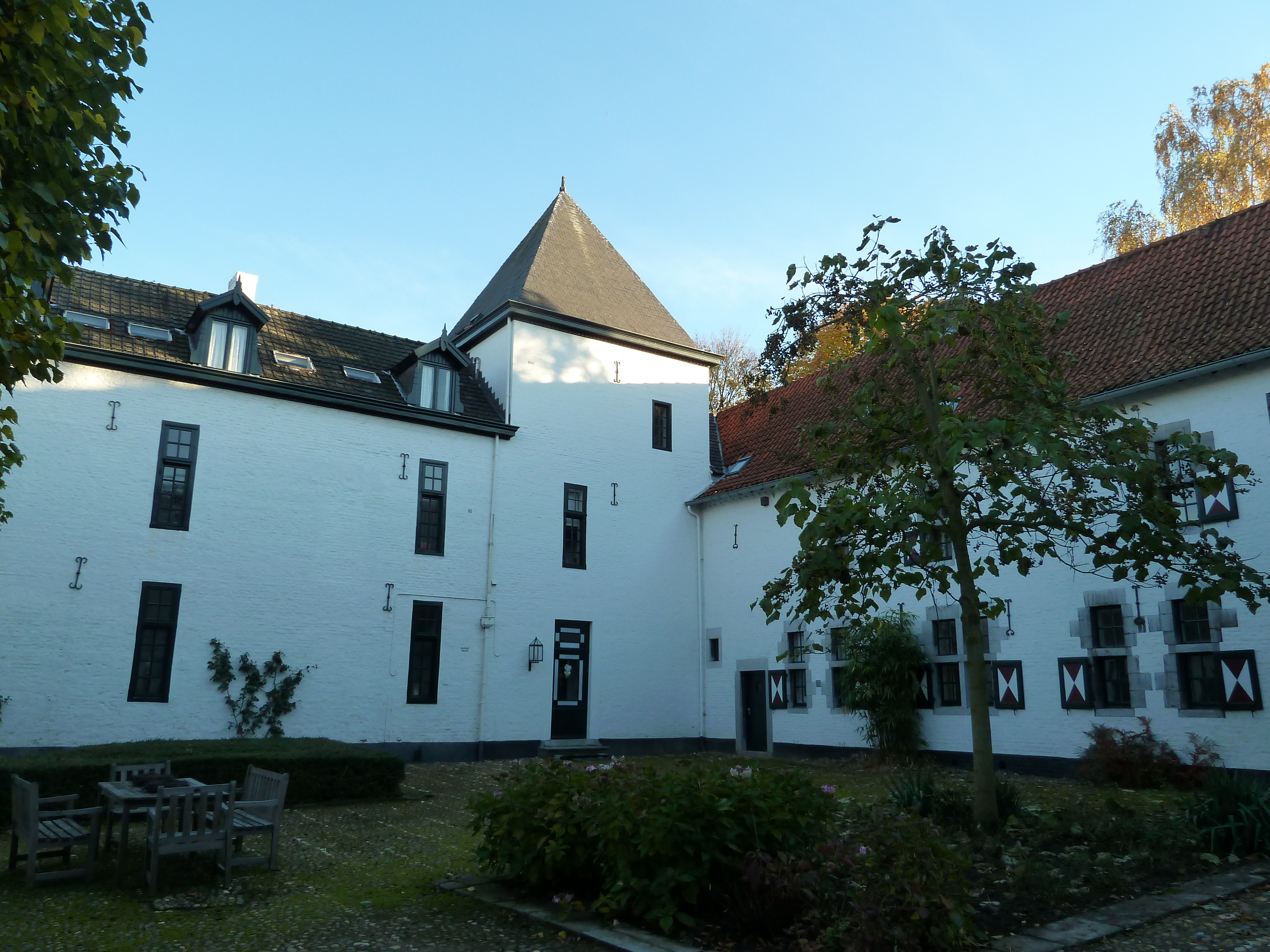
Estate Rustenburg

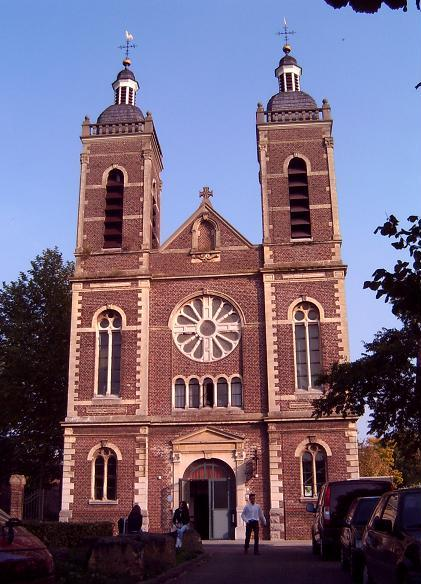
Old St Agnes Church

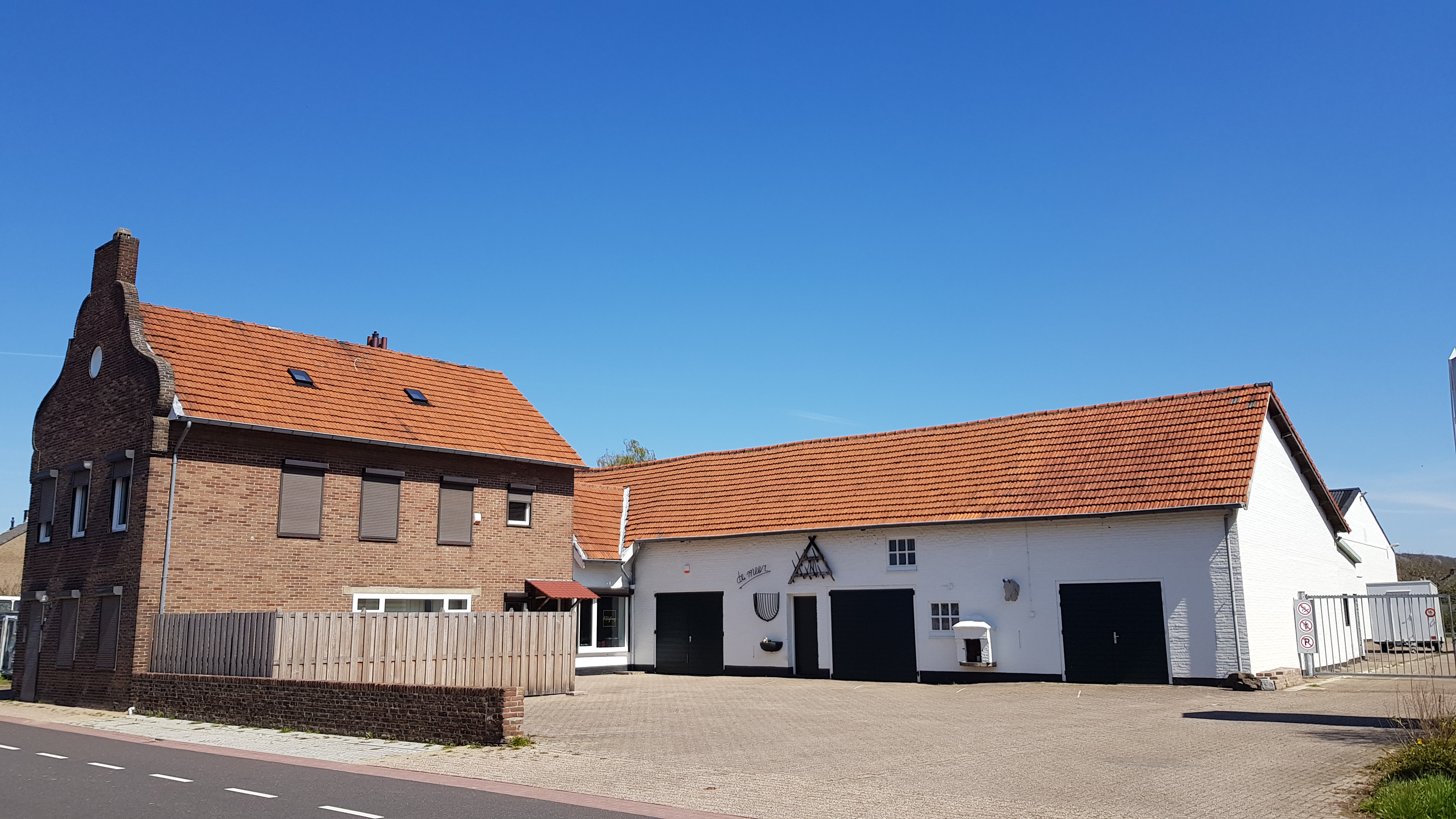
Farm in Bunde

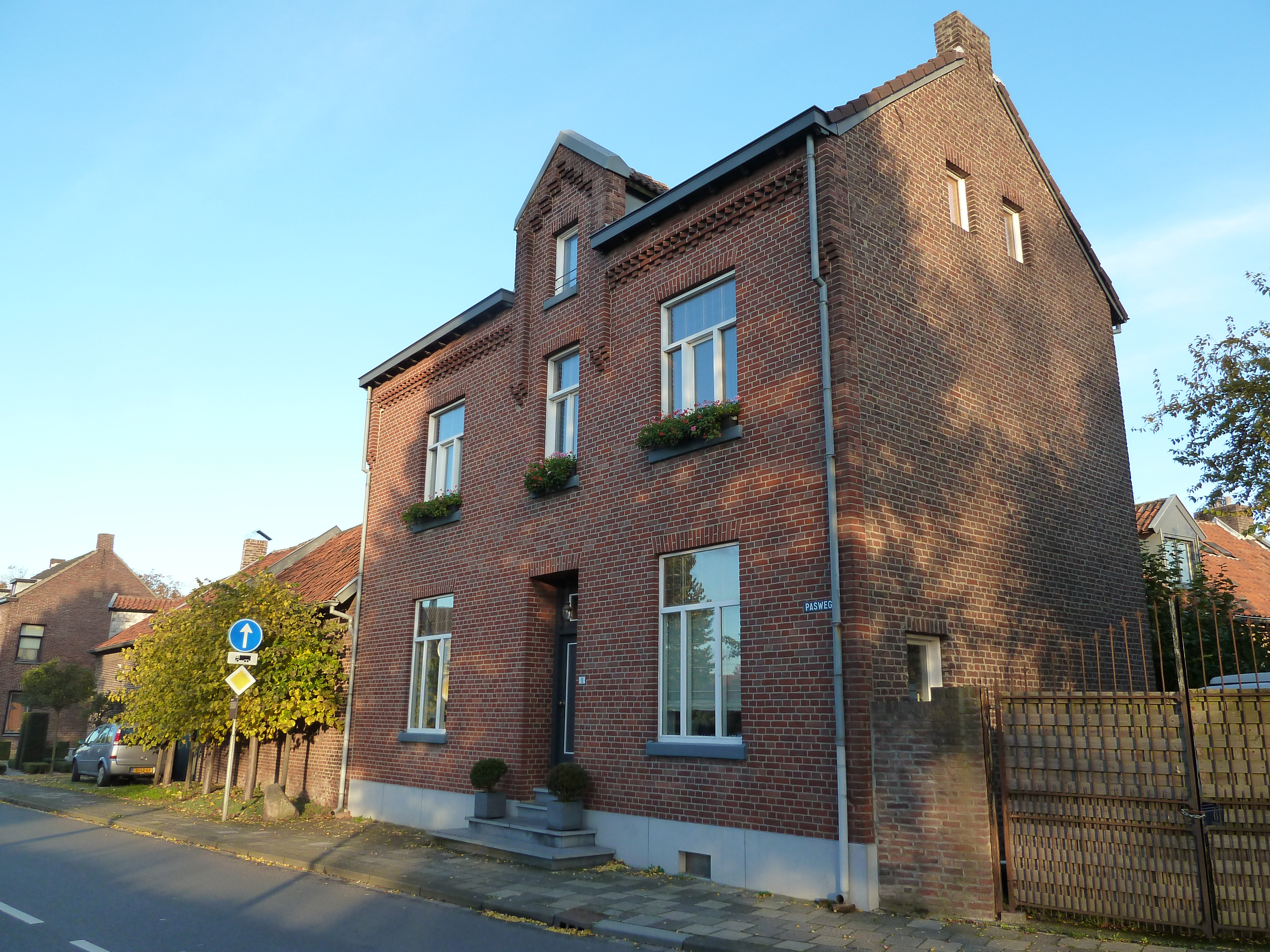
House in Bunde
