= Irene Capek =

Australian politician (1924–2006)

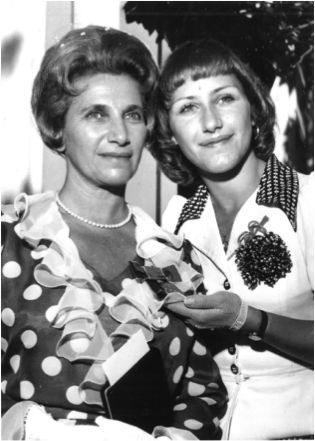
Capek and daughter, Annabelle, at the Member of the Order of the British Empire Investiture Ceremony, 12 April 1973.

Irene Capek MBE (28 December 1924 – 19 November 2006) was a Jewish Holocaust survivor, humanitarian and local Australian politician. She was the fourth ever female member of the Caulfield City Council, was the recipient of the Caulfield City Council Citizen of the Year award, and went on to become a Member of the Order of the British Empire (MBE).

== Early life ==
Capek was born Bedřiška "Iška" Lavecká (anglicised to 'Irene') to parents Anna and Emil Lavecký in Prague, Czechoslovakia on 28 December 1924. She lived with her parents until 1931, when her mother died from typhoid and her father, a travelling salesman and recovering World War 1 serviceman, placed her in the care of her grandmother. She was transferred to the care of a Prague orphanage in 1936 following the death of her grandmother, and to a nearby English boarding school soon after.

== Holocaust ==
The German occupation of Czechoslovakia began with the annexation of the Sudetenland in 1938, and the subsequent establishment of Bohemia and Moravia as German protectorates in March 1939. Capek describes these early years of German occupation as 'gradual, and systematic'. Her persecution developed over the course of a three-year period, beginning with her removal from school, and progressing to her banishment from work and subsequent placement in a Jewish Youth Hostel. The situation changed dramatically with the assassination of German Nazi Officer Reinhard Heydrich in 1942. Heydrich's death saw a marked increase in transportations from Prague to Theresienstadt concentration camp. By September 1942, Capek herself was bound for the camp. Capek remembered Theresienstadt 'in mixed terms'. She recalled the horror of finding her father malnourished and emaciated on her arrival there, and watched him die from pleurisy two days later. She recalled the inhumanity she felt in knowing that the old and sick were dying at the camp, and the scenes she witnessed in the early days as a cleaner in the camp's infirmary. By September 1944, she had met and become engaged to marry one of the camp's inhabitants, Igor "Sisi" Eisenberg. Upon learning that he and hundreds of the camp's other men were bound for Auschwitz, Capek and five hundred of the camp's women volunteered to join them. At the time, Capek recalled that the men and women of the camp thought they were being moved to 'assist with the war efforts'. Capek arrived at Auschwitz on 1 October 1944. Upon arrival, the leader of her group was shot and killed as she exited the train. The group were then gathered outside the gates of the camp, where they were separated into two groups by ‘a man in a white coat’. After entering the camp, Capek and her group were shaved, showered and dressed in dog collars and rags. Over the ensuing four weeks, Capek was woken every morning at 5:00 am for roll call and fed red beetroot in water. Amongst the horrors, she recalled witnessing German guards murder two Polish women, and people throwing themselves at the electrical fence. By her own account, she was 'lucky' to have arrived at Auschwitz as late in the war as she did. By 28 October 1944, Capek was being transported again, this time to the Kudowa-Sackisch concentration camp, where she remained for the duration of the war. She stated that the camp was run largely by 'female Gestapo officers', and was required to work as a machinist, grave digger and railway worker during her time there. At the end of the war, on 8 May 1945, Capek was marched by the Gestapo to the border of Czechoslovakia with the remainder of the camp's inhabitants. She was met by the townsfolk of Nachod, who took her and the remainder of the camp into their care as they recovered.

== Post-war years ==
After the war, Capek returned to Prague and worked for the Red Cross, tending to the sick and dying who had returned from Europe's concentration camps. It was there that she learnt that her fiancé, Sisi, had died of dysentery soon after being transferred from Theresienstadt. It was also there that she re-united with Fred Capek. Fred and his late-wife Greta, who was murdered at Auschwitz, had been Capek's supervisors at the Jewish Youth Hostel she attended in Prague before the war. Within a year, Capek and Fred were married, and expecting their first son, John.

== Migration to Australia ==
Three years later, fearing the Stalinisation of Europe, the Capeks fled from Prague to Australia. They arrived in Melbourne aboard the Cyreniaii on 5 April 1949. The years following their arrival were lean. For the first five years, the family lived in a converted garage. Irene worked as a cleaner and waitress, and Fred worked as a gardener and conveyor belt operator. Their fortunes changed when Fred, a mechanical engineer by trade, obtained work at a local engineering company. Employed to clean the company's European machinery, Fred took the liberty of designing machinery for the company in his free time, and eventually impressed his employers with a design for commercially harvesting sea-wood. He was given a job as an engineer, and his wages increased commensurably. In 1953, this allowed Irene, who had just given birth to the couple's second child, Annabelle, to quit her cleaning and waitressing jobs, and focus on her community endeavours.

== Humanitarian work ==
With the challenges of settling in a new country fresh in her mind, Capek focused her efforts on migrant services. She began by attending the Port Melbourne docks, migrant hostels and local hospitals to hand out information to new arrivals. Sensing a need for a more concerted effort, she went on to establish the Prahran Migrant Advisory Service, and lobby government through her roles as an Executive Member of the Commonwealth and Victorian Migrant Advisory Councils. Her other appointments in migrant and community services included: United Nations International Children's Emergency Fund. Australian Auxiliary (Secretary and Treasurer); Good Neighbours Council (United Nations Delegate, and Vice President); Caulfield Community Services (foundation member); Commonwealth Council of the Ageing (Executive Member); United Nations Association of Australia (Executive Member); and Caulfield Citizens Advice Bureau (Member).

== Election to the Caulfield City Council ==
Capek was elected as a councillor to the City of Caulfield in September 1977, making her the fourth woman to achieve this office. Ultimately, she served less than a year on the council, leaving office in June 1978 so that she could resume work with people at a more community level, and attend to family matters.

== Honours ==
Capek's involvement in migrant welfare was recognised on 1 January 1973, when she was appointed a Member of the Order of the British Empire. Her appointment was formalised on 12 April 1973, when she attended Victoria's Government House to be vested with her insignia.

Member of the Order of the British Empire (MBE)	1973 The Queen's New Year Honours – "For community services and particularly in migrant welfare and integration."

Capek was named the Caulfield City Council Citizen of the Year on 22 January 1988, the year of Australia's bicentenary celebrations.
