= Willem Victor Bartholomeus =

Dutch organist (1825–1892)

Willem Victor Bartholomeus (Bunde, 11 February 1825 – Zwolle, 13 August 1892) was a Dutch organist and conductor.

He was born in the family of sexton/organist/church singer Jan/Jean Bartholomeus and Maria Cornelia Isabella Hagemans. His brother Jan Nicolaas Bartholomeus (or Jean Nicolas Bartholomeus) was also an organist and singer. He himself was married to the German milliner Gertien Elisabetha Dorothea Wilms.

He received his musical education at the Brussels Conservatory. His teacher was François-Joseph Fétis, who taught him piano, church organ and composition.

On 1 May 1850 he was appointed organist of the St. Michael's Church in Zwolle. He also established himself as a private tutor in harmony, piano and singing. He was also a member and later conductor of the Liedertafel Caecilia in Zwolle and led the choir of St Michael's Church, which performed polyphonic works with the help of boys' voices, such as Mozart's Mass in C minor.

In 1871 he co-founded the Zangvereeniging for the practice of classical music in Zwolle, which in early 1872 performed The Seasons by Joseph Haydn under his direction, accompanied by the Orchest van Stumpff from Amsterdam and local dilettantes as soloists. In 1873 he became the director of the Zangvereeniging. At the beginning of 1873 the oratorio Samson by George Frideric Handel was performed with the accompaniment of the Great Symphony Orchestra of Cornelis Coenen (later the Utrecht Municipal Orchestra). Among the soloists were Wilhelmina Gips and Mrs. Anna Collin-Tobisch.

In 1873 Barthelomeus was also co-founder and first conductor of the choir of the Zwolle section of the Maatschappij tot Bevordering der Toonkunst, a merger of several Zwolle choirs, which still exists today as Toonkunstkoor Caecilia.

The various members of the Bartholomeus family have several compositions to their name. It is unclear who wrote what. This concerns church music and songs.

== Sources ==
- J.H. Letzer, Muzikaal Nederland. 1850-1910, Utrecht: J.L. Beijers 1913, p. 7 (with incorrect date of death)
