= Godfried Pieters =

Dutch sculptor

- Born: 25 November 1936 (age 89); Bunde, Limburg, Netherlands
- Education: Maastricht Institute of Arts and Jan van Eyck Academie in Maastricht
- Known for: Sculpture

Godfridus Mathias (Godfried) Pieters (born 25 November 1936) is a Dutch sculptor.

== Life and work ==
Pieters was educated at the Maastricht Institute of Arts and the Jan van Eyck Academie in Maastricht. His oeuvre shows a preference for the human figure (especially torsos and heads) and nature (birds, fish and plants and tubers), which he depicts in a realistic style.

== Works ==
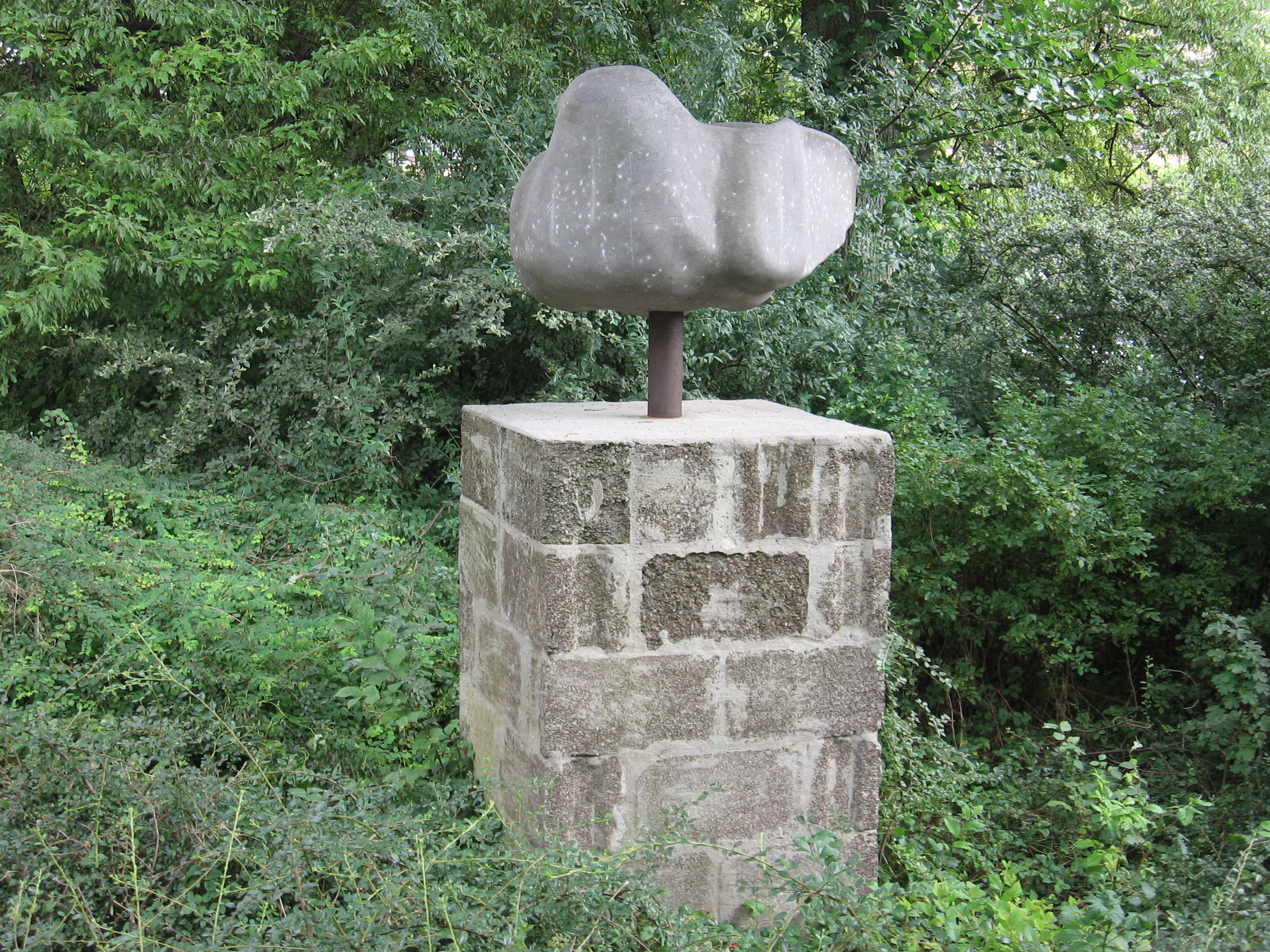
Vogel (1968), Delft

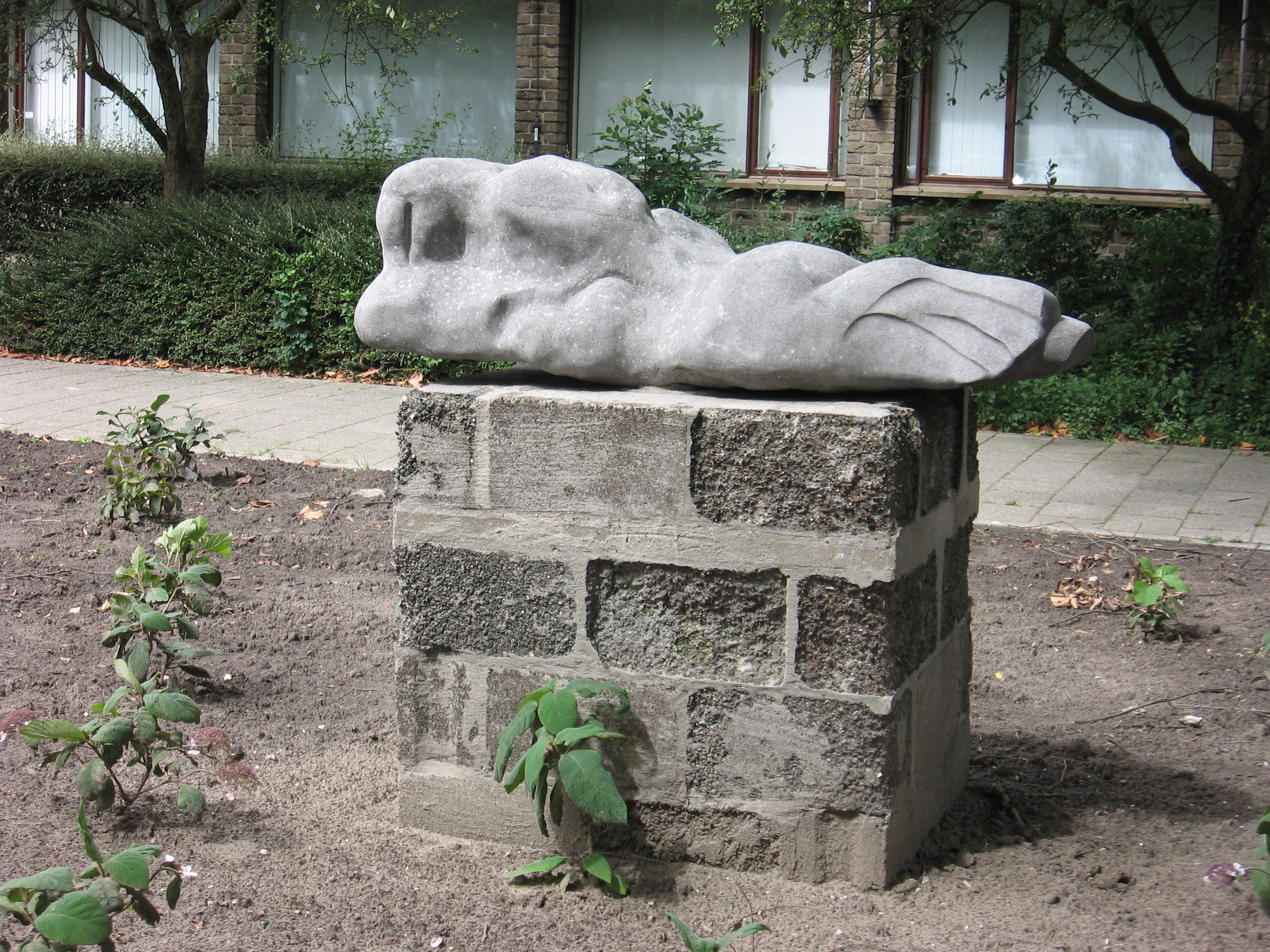
Waternimf (1969), Delft
