= Charles Jordan (baritone) =

Canadian opera singer

Charles Jordan (3 April 1915 – 27 June 1986) was a Canadian baritone and voice teacher. As a performer he was mainly active on Canadian radio.

== Early life and education ==
Jordan was born into a Jewish family in Montreal. He first studied singing with Adrienne Bourassa in Montreal during the 1930s, and later was a pupil of Albert Whitehead at the Toronto Conservatory of Music from 1941 to 1943.

== Career ==
Jordan made his professional debut singing French chassons on CKAC in 1937. He performed regularly on CKAC and with various Canadian Broadcasting Corporation orchestras in Montreal through 1940. From 1941 to 1943 he recorded several oratorios and operas by Purcell and Handel for the CBC, including Polyphemus in Acis and Galatea. He also sang on the show Air Band in 1943.

From 1944 to 1950 Jordan worked as a radio singer for both the CBC in Toronto, and for the American radio programs Sweetwood Serenade (NBC) and Sunday Night Serenade (MBS) in New York City.

After 1950, Jordan divided his time between performing and teaching singing in Toronto. Several well-known actors studied singing with him, including Susan Clark, Lorne Greene, and William Shatner. He also made several albums during the 1950s of Canadian classical music and Canadian folk songs, including Folk Songs of Canada, based on Edith Fowke's book of the same name. It was recorded with singer Joyce Sullivan and released on the Hallmark label. Critics praised the quality of the singing, but pointed out the lack of authenticity involved in having classically trained singing for folk songs.

He is the father of Canadian singer-songwriter Marc Jordan.

Jordan died 27 June 1986 in Toronto.
