= The Best of The Manhattan Transfer =

The Best of the Manhattan Transfer

Greatest hits album by The Manhattan Transfer
- Released: November or December 1981
- Genre: Vocal Jazz
- Label: Atlantic

The Manhattan Transfer chronology
Mecca for Moderns (1981)	The Best of the Manhattan Transfer (1981)	Bodies and Souls (1983)

The Best Of The Manhattan Transfer was released in 1981 on the Atlantic Records label by The Manhattan Transfer for the Holiday Season. It contained the "best of" their hits from their early Atlantic years (1975–1981). All of the tracks had been previously released on their Atlantic studio albums up to the point of the compilation's release.

The album cover art is an adaptation of A.M. Cassandre's 1927 Nord Express poster.

== Track listing ==
North American and worldwide CD track listing

1. "Tuxedo Junction" (Erskine Hawkins, William Johnson, Buddy Feyne, Julian Dash) - 2:44
2. "The Boy from New York City" (John Taylor, George Davis) - 3:40
3. "Twilight Zone/Twilight Tone" (Jay Graydon, Bernard Herrmann, Alan Paul) - 3:55
4. "Body and Soul" (Johnny Green, Edward Heyman, Robert Sour, Frank Eyton) - 4:25
5. "Candy" (Alex Kramer, Mack David, Joan Whitney) - 3:26
6. "Four Brothers" (Jimmy Giuffre, Jon Hendricks) - 3:47
7. "Birdland" (Joe Zawinul, Jon Hendricks) - 6:00
8. "Gloria" (Esther Navarro) - 2:57
9. "Trickle Trickle" (Clarence Bassett) - 2:18
10. "Operator" (William Spivery) - 3:09
11. "Java Jive" (Milton Drake, Ben Oakland) - 2:44
12. "A Nightingale Sang in Berkeley Square" (Manning Sherwin, Eric Maschwitz) - 3:46

=== Notes ===
- "Chanson D'Amour" was included on European and Australasian vinyl and cassette editions as well as Australasian CD editions.
- "A Nightingale Sang in Berkeley Square" was replaced with "Where Did Our Love Go" on Australasian vinyl and cassette editions.
- "Candy" was replaced with "On a Little Street in Singapore" on European vinyl and cassette editions.

== Certifications ==
Region	Certification	Certified units/sales
Australia (ARIA)	Platinum	50,000^{^}
^{^} Shipments figures based on certification alone.
