= René Shuman =

Dutch singer-songwriter (born 1974)

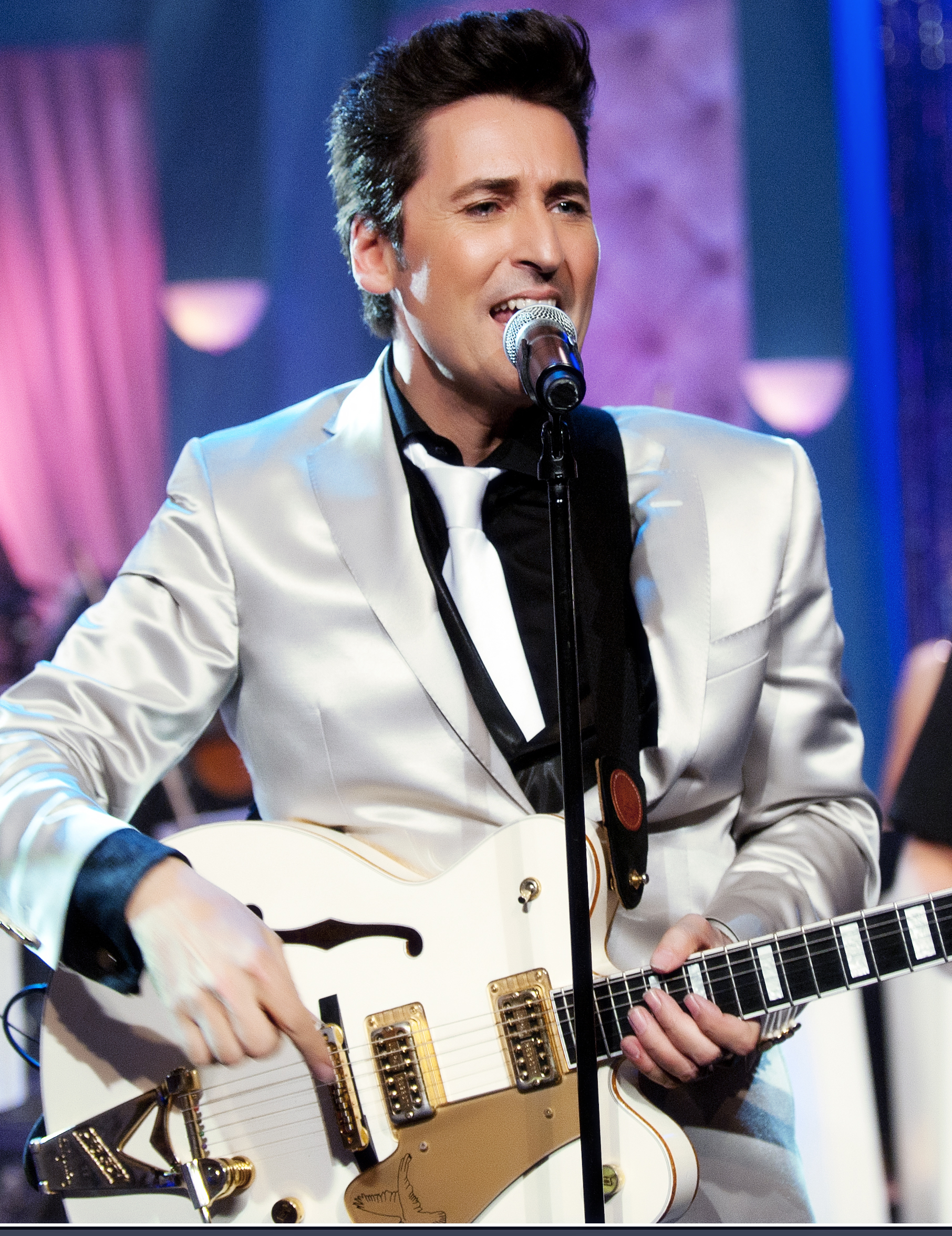
- René Shuman

Background information
- Born: 5 December 1967 (age 58); Geleen, Limburg, Netherlands
- Genres: Rock and roll, country
- Occupations: Singer; guitarist; songwriter; producer
- Years active: 1986–present
- Spouse: Angela Brouwers (m. 2009)

René Shuman (born 5 December 1967) is a Dutch singer, guitarist, songwriter and producer.

Shuman gained national fame through his performance in Henny Huisman's Soundmixshow. He came in second with Elvis Presley's repertoire, a rendition of the songs "Are You Lonesome Tonight?" and "Don't Be Cruel". He performed several times with the original band members of Elvis Presley, both in group form and individually. He was on stage with the Jordanaires (Presley's original vocal group), the TCB Band, drummer DJ Fontana, Cherrill Nielsen, Charly Hodge and guitarist Scotty Moore. In 1999, Shuman presented Scotty Moore with a Lifetime Achievement Award in Amsterdam.

Shuman has been nicknamed the "Dutch Elvis". Despite the fact that the Dutch public often associates Shuman with the music of Elvis Presley, it took until 2003 before he released a cover of 'the King' together with singer Angel-Eye. His repertoire until then was mostly self-produced.

Shuman included "Rhythm of My Heart", a song written by Marc Jordan and John Capek, on his 1986 debut album, René Shuman. In 1990, British singer Rod Stewart recorded the song for his 1991 album Vagabond Heart. Stewart's version reached No. 3 on the UK Singles Chart, No. 5 on the US Billboard Hot 100, and No. 1 on the Canadian and Irish charts.

He married his partner Angel-Eye in February 14th 2010 on Hawaii (Kauaï).
