= Kyara Stijns =

Dutch cyclist

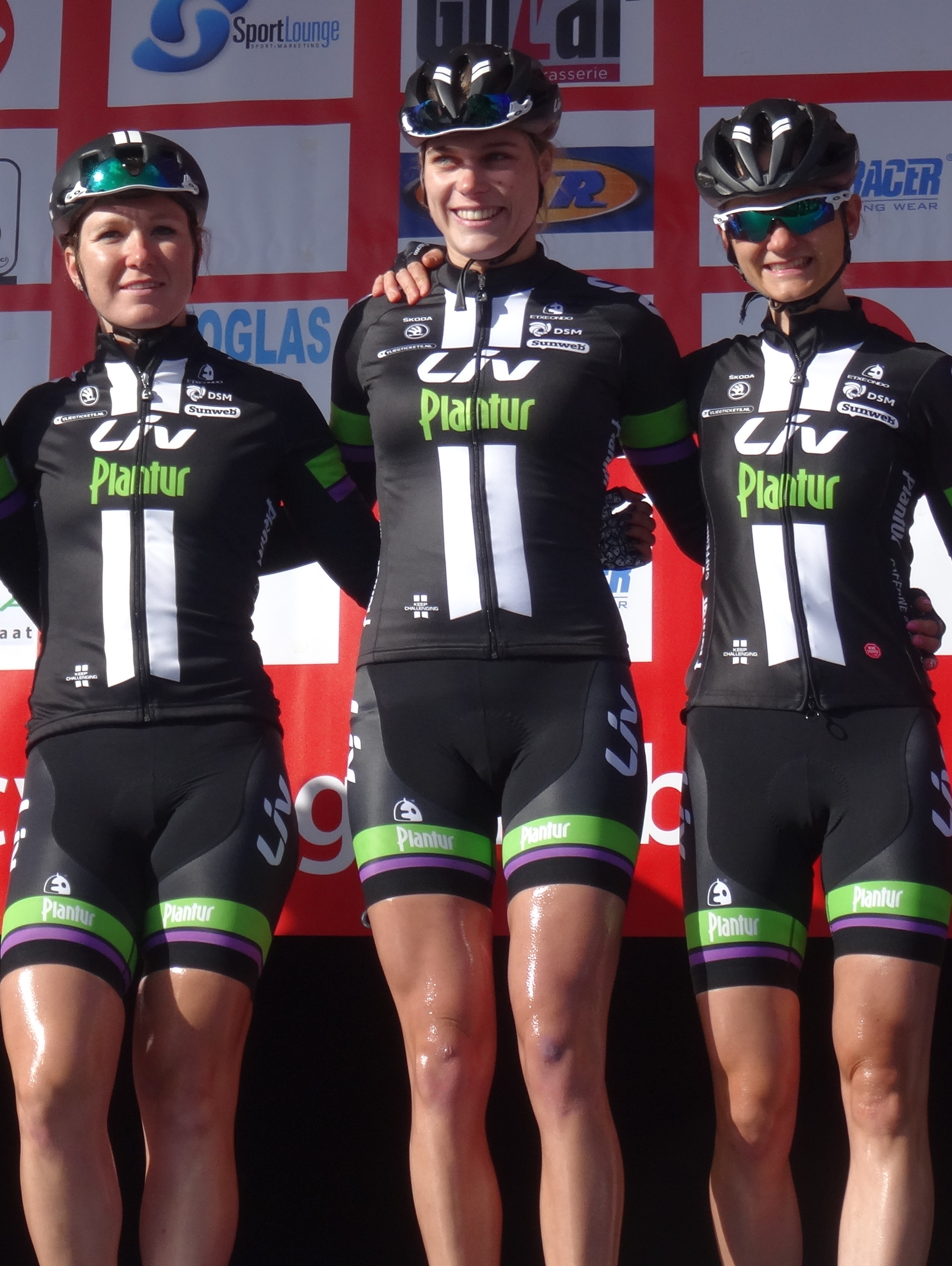
- Kyara Stijns, Le Samyn des Dames 2015

Personal information
- Born: 9 October 1995 (age 31) Bunde, Limburg, Netherlands
- Height: 175 cm (5 ft 9 in)
- Weight: 61.5 kg (136 lb)

Cycling career
- Sport: Cycling
- Current team: Team Liv-Plantur
- Discipline: Road
- Role: Rider
- Rider type: Climber

Amateur team
- 2013: WCL Bergklimmers

Professional teams
- 2014: Giant-Shimano
- 2015-: Team Liv-Plantur

Major wins
- 2013 Dutch road champion (junior)

Kyara Stijns (born 9 October 1995) is a Dutch professional racing cyclist. She started cycling with club team 'WCL Bergklimmers' in the south of the province of Limburg. In 2013, she won the Dutch junior national championships road race. As a result, she became pro riding for Giant-Shimano in 2014. On Friday 31 July 2015 she became third in the Profronde Heerlen, after winner Chantal Blaak and second Anna van der Breggen. On Sunday 6 September 2015 she started the last stage of the Holland Ladies Tour in her hometown Bunde. In the same month the team announced Stijns will also be riding for Liv-Plantur in 2016.

== Major results ==
2013

- Dutch road champion (junior)

== See also ==
- 2014 Team Giant-Shimano season
- 2015 Team Liv-Plantur season
