= Marie Narelle =

Australian singer

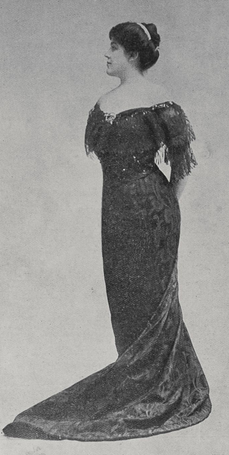
- Marie Narelle, from a 1906 newspaper.
- Born: Catherine Mary Ryan; 28 January 1870; Combaning station, near Temora, New South Wales
- Died: 26 January 1941 (aged 70); Chipping Norton, Oxfordshire, England
- Other names: Catherine Mary Callaghan (after first marriage); Catherine Mary Currie (after second marriage)
- Occupation: Singer

Marie Narelle (28 January 1870 – 26 January 1941), born Catherine Mary Ryan, was an Australian singer, billed as "the Australian Queen of Irish Song".

== Early life ==
Catherine Mary Ryan, called "Molly", was born at Combaning station, near Temora, New South Wales, the daughter of John Joseph Ryan and Catherine Mary Comans Ryan. Her father was a goldminer and a rancher. She attended a convent school in Wagga Wagga, with further vocal training later in life, in Sydney.

== Career ==
Left to support three young children as a single parent, Molly Callaghan started teaching music to remote students in Candelo, riding her horse between lessons. She soon had a music studio in Sydney, and began performing under the stage name "Marie Narelle", and billed as "the Australian Queen of Irish Song."

As Marie Narelle, she gave concerts of Irish and Scottish ballads, arias, and other popular works. She was invited to Ireland to perform in 1902, and took the opportunity to study Gaelic. She performed at a benefit concert in London's Royal Albert Hall in 1902, sharing the bill with Clara Butt and Ada Crossley.

During the 1904–1905 season, she sang in New York, was part of the Irish delegation at the St. Louis World's Fair, and made recordings for Edison. She toured New Zealand in 1906, toured the United States in 1917, and was heard on Australian stages again in 1909 and in 1925–1926. She gave a concert at Carnegie Hall with both of her daughters in 1921, a fundraiser for the Woman's Hospital Alumnae Sick Benefit Fund.

Narelle was based in New York City after 1910, and in England after her second husband's death in 1934.

== Personal life ==
Catherine Mary Ryan married Matthew Aloysius Callaghan, a childhood friend, in January 1891, in Sydney. They had three children together, Reginald, Kathleen, and Rita, before they separated in 1894. The Callaghans divorced in 1909. She married again, to engineer Harry Allan Currie, in New York City in 1911. He died in 1934, and she died in 1941, in Chipping Norton, Oxfordshire, England, aged 70 years. Kathleen Narelle, an accomplished pianist, married H. Newton Quinn; Rita Narelle, a coloratura soprano, married Dr George Eccles. Reginald Narelle was a businessman in America; he married Marie Cassidy in New York.

Narelle's younger cousin Eva Mylott was also known as a singer in Australia and abroad. They sometimes toured and performed together. Mylott is remembered today as the grandmother of actor Mel Gibson.
