= John Capek =

- Born: 27 November 1947 (age 78); Prague, Czechoslovakia
- Occupation: Composer

John Capek (born 27 November 1947) is a Czech-born Australian-Canadian composer, arranger, keyboardist and producer.

== Biography ==
John Capek was born in Prague, Czechoslovakia (now the Czech Republic) on 27 November 1947. He is the son of Fred Capek, a concert pianist and mechanical engineer, and Irene Capek, both survivors of Terezín and the Auschwitz concentration camp. Capek moved with his family to Melbourne, Australia at the age of three. His father was his first piano teacher and showed him the works of Czech composers Bedřich Smetana and Antonín Dvořák, which he was playing by the age of three.

Capek's wife Batsheva, born in Toronto, Canada, is a singer and guitar player, known for her Yiddish and Hebrew songs.The couple now live in Nashville, Tennessee.

== Career ==
Capek studied piano as a child, then later, influenced by Little Richard, Ray Charles and Chuck Berry, co-founded Carson, one of Australia's premier blues bands. He graduated as a chemical engineer but left this job soon after to pursue his passion of music. Capek then played in the bands King Harvest, Flite, and with Australian musical artists Doug Parkinson and Renee Geyer.

While living in Victoria, Capek was featured on an episode of the Australian game show New Faces, in the 1969 final. As act number 8, he performed St Louis Blues by W. C. Handy on the piano, accompanied by Billy Hyde on drums and Kenny Lester on bass. Capek received scores of 82, 90, and 90 from judges Frank Wilson, Terry Dear, and Barry Crocker.

In 1973, Capek emigrated to Canada.

In Toronto, Capek played keyboards and arranged songs for Marc Jordan, Ian Thomas, Dan Hill and Dianne Brooks, and produced hit recordings for Hill, Ken Tobias, the Good Brothers, the Downchild Blues Band and Amy Sky. He formed a songwriting partnership with Jordan and moved to Los Angeles, placing songs with René Shuman, Rod Stewart, Joe Cocker, Diana Ross, Manhattan Transfer, Isaac Hayes and many others. As a session musician, Capek recorded with producers Humberto Gatica and John Boylan. As John Capek & the Family of Man, he released his debut recording, "Indaba (Mesa Blue Moon)".

Capek co-wrote much of Australian singer John Paul Young's 1984 album, One Foot in Front.

Returning to Toronto in 1995, Capek continued writing for Stewart, as well as for Cher, Amanda Marshall, Bonnie Raitt amongst others, and also scored the television series Grandpa's Garden and Letters to God.

== Appointments ==
Capek is a former director of the Songwriters Association of Canada and the Canadian Songwriters Hall of Fame, and founding faculty member of the songwriting program at the Royal Conservatory of Music.

== Songwriting ==
An exceptionally prolific pop songwriter, Capek is noted for his use of complex harmonies, mostly associated with Tin Pan Alley. His biggest success to date has been "Rhythm of My Heart" with Rod Stewart. Other Capek hits include "Take Me Home" with Joe Cocker, featured in the film Blown Away, "Promises" with Amanda Marshall, "Love So High" with Cher, and "Deep Water" with Bonnie Raitt. His songs have also been recorded by artists in the Czech Republic and used in films such as Cocktail, The Silencer and The Perfect Storm.
