= Marc Jordan =

Canadian singer-songwriter and producer

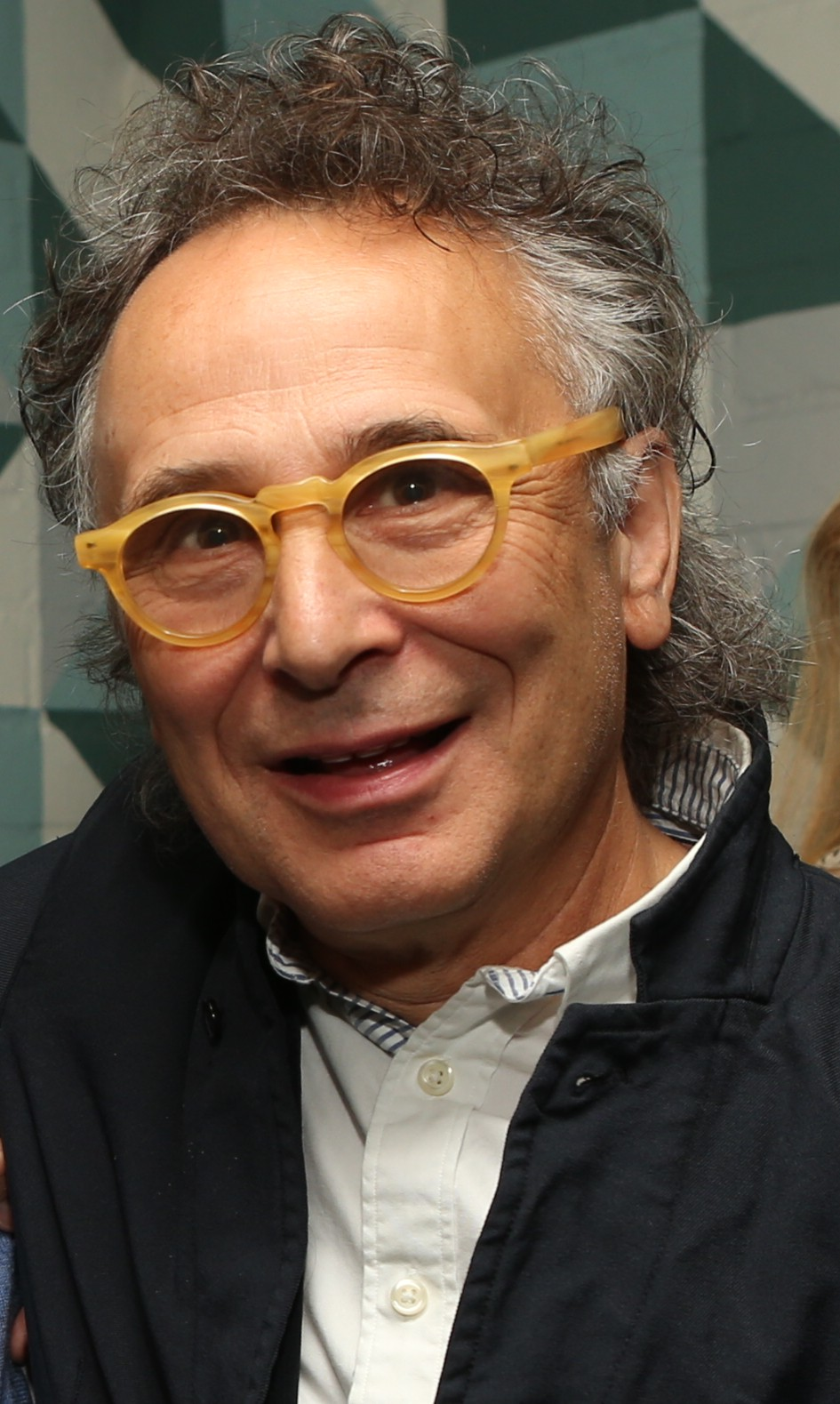
- Jordan at a Canadian Film Centre Gala in 2014

Background information
- Born: Marc Wallace Jordan; March 6, 1948 (age 78); Brooklyn, New York, U.S.
- Genres: Rock, jazz fusion
- Occupations: Musician, songwriter, record producer, actor
- Instruments: Vocals, guitar, Keyboard
- Years active: 1974–present
- Labels: EMI/Blue Note, Warner Bros., RCA, CBS
- Website: marcjordan.com

Marc Wallace Jordan (born March 6, 1948) is an American-born Canadian singer-songwriter, record producer, session musician, and actor. Covering a wide variety of genres, he has written songs for a number of well-known artists, including Diana Ross, Rod Stewart, Cher, Bette Midler, Chicago, and Josh Groban. He was named best producer with Steven MacKinnon at the Juno Awards in 1994 for "Waiting for a Miracle" from Reckless Valentine. In early 2014, Jordan was named Chair of Slaight Family Music Lab at Norman Jewison's Canadian Film Centre.

== Biography ==
Born in Brooklyn, New York, the son of Canadian singer Charles Jordan, Marc Jordan grew up in a musical household in Toronto after his father returned to Canada. He studied film at Brock University but soon turned to music, coming to public attention as a guitarist for Bobby Vee.

With the Canadian division of CBS Records, Jordan released some singles in 1974, which included "It's a Fine Line", "New York Kids", "Original Sin". They were not very successful themselves, but they impressed American music producer Gary Katz, and in 1977 Jordan reached a U.S. deal with Warner Bros. Records. This period with Warner spawned the Canadian hit songs "Marina del Rey" and "Survival" from the record Mannequin; a second record produced by Jay Graydon called Blue Desert was released in 1979, and is regarded as a classic of the West Coast Sound of the period.

In the 1980s, Jordan was signed to RCA for two records. Paul De Villiers produced the first, Talking Through Pictures, and Kim Bullard the second, called C.O.W.. In 1988, Jordan sang and co-wrote the theme song to the hit Australian movie Boulevard of Broken Dreams which was nominated for an AFI Award for Best Film. In 1989, he and Jay Gruska received a Genie Award nomination for Best Original Song for "Shadow Dance", a song they wrote for the film Shadow Dancing.

In 1994, Jordan won a Juno Award for "Producer of the Year" (along with co-producer Steven MacKinnon) for "Waiting for a Miracle" from his Reckless Valentine album.

After independently releasing the critically acclaimed recordings Reckless Valentine and Cool Jam Black Earth, he was signed to Blue Note/EMI Canada in 1999, and followed up with two more jazz-oriented CDs, This Is How Men Cry and Make Believe Ballroom.

In 2014 the Canadian Film Centre appointed Jordan as the musical director of its Slaight Family Music Lab.

During the summer of 2016, Jordan was performing with singers Murray McLauchlan, Cindy Church and Ian Thomas in the group Lunch At Allen's, in a number of towns and small cities in Ontario, Canada. He is married to fellow singer-songwriter Amy Sky. They live in Toronto and have a cottage in Muskoka with their two children, Ezra and Zoe. Jordan and Sky are both national UNICEF Goodwill Ambassadors for Canada.

Jordan made his acting debut in Michael McGowan's 2010 sports musical Score: A Hockey Musical, where he plays Edgar Gordon, a pacifist father who along with his wife (Olivia Newton-John) have a 17-year-old son who has a talent for hockey.

Jordan's fifteenth and latest studio album, Waiting for the Sun to Rise, was released on April 21, 2023, through Linus Entertainment. It is Jordan's first album of original material since On a Perfect Day (2013).

In October 2023, Jordan and his long-time collaborator John Capek were announced as new inductees into the Canadian Songwriters Hall of Fame.

== This is How Men Cry ==
First released in Canada by Blue Note/EMI on October 25, 1999, This is How Men Cry contains six tracks written by Jordan: "This Is How Men Cry," "Charlie Parker Loves Me" (covered by Rod Stewart on his album Human, released February 6, 2001), "Slow Bombing the World," "I Must Have Left My Heart," "Let's Get Lost," and "London in the Rain". There are an additional three covers: Willie Nelson's '"Crazy," Elvis Costello's "Almost Blue," and Manny Curtis' "Let It Be Me". The lead track, "This is How Men Cry," is a poem about how men communicate, or more often how they don't.

== Personal life ==
Marc Jordan is married to Amy Sky and they have two children together, a son, Ezra and a daughter, Zoe. Jordan is Jewish. His father was a cantor.

Jordan is a member of the Canadian charity Artists Against Racism.

== Discography ==
=== Albums ===
| Year | Details | Peak chart position |
| Year | Details | Canada |
|---|---|---|
| 1978 | Mannequin: Released: 1978; Label: Warner Bros. | 83 |
| 1979 | Blue Desert: Released: 1979; Label: Warner Bros. | 74 |
| 1983 | A Hole in the Wall: Released: 1983; Label: Sound Design | – |
| 1987 | Talking Through Pictures: Released: 1987; Label: RCA | – |
| 1990 | Cow: Released: 1990; Label: RCA | 73 |
| 1993 | Reckless Valentine: Released: 1993; Label: Sin-Drome | – |
| 1996 | Cool Jam Black Earth: Released: 1996; Label: Magada International | – |
| 1999 | This Is How Men Cry: Released: 1999; Label: Blue Note | – |
| 2004 | Make Believe Ballroom: Released: 2004; Label: EMI | – |
| 2010 | Crucifix in Dreamland: Released: 2010; Label: EMI | – |
| 2013 | On a Perfect Day: Released: 2013; Label: Lettuce Head Productions | – |
| 2019 | Both Sides: Released: 2019; Label: Linus Entertainment | – |
| 2022 | He Sang She Sang: Released: 2022; Label: Linus Entertainment | – |
| 2023 | Waiting for the Sun to Rise: Released: 2023; Label: Linus Entertainment | – |

=== Live albums ===
- Live (1980)
- Live: Now and Then (1999)

=== Compilation albums ===
- Living in Marina del Rey and Other Stories (2002)
- Norm Amadio and Friends (2009)

=== Singles ===
| Year | Single | Chart Positions | | | Album |
| Year | Single | CAN AC | CAN | CAN Country | Album |
|---|---|---|---|---|---|
| 1974 | "New York Kids" | — | — | — | singles only |
| 1974 | "Original Sin" | — | — | — | singles only |
| 1974 | "It's a Fine Line" | — | — | 47 | singles only |
| 1978 | "Survival" | — | 83 | — | Mannequin |
| 1978 | "Marina del Rey" | 23 | — | — | Mannequin |
| 1978 | "One Step Ahead of the Blues" | — | — | — | Mannequin |
| 1979 | "I'm a Camera" | 30 | 80 | — | Blue Desert |
| 1979 | "Generalities" | — | — | — | Blue Desert |
| 1980 | "Secrets" | — | — | — | Live at El Mocambo |
| 1980 | "New York City" | 13 | 81 | — | Live at El Mocambo |
| 1980 | "Potential and Air" | — | — | — | Live at El Mocambo |
| 1981 | "You Found Out" | 25 | — | — | single only |
| 1987 | "I Was Your Fool" | — | — | — | Talking Through Pictures |
| 1987 | "This Independence" | 27 | — | — | Talking Through Pictures |
| 1988 | "Catch the Moon" | — | — | — | Talking Through Pictures |
| 1989 | "Shadow Dance" | — | — | — | single only |
| 1989 | "Burning Down the Amazon" | — | — | — | C.O.W. (Conserve Our World) |
| 1990 | "Edge of the World" | — | — | — | C.O.W. (Conserve Our World) |
| 1992 | "Her Body Makes Vows" (with Exchange) | — | — | — | Exchange (Exchange album) |
| 1992 | "'Til the Last Teardrop Falls" (with Exchange and Amy Sky) | 13 | 44 | — | Exchange (Exchange album) |
| 1994 | "Rhythm of My Heart" | — | — | — | Reckless Valentine |
| 1994 | "Waiting for a Miracle" | — | — | — | Reckless Valentine |
| 1994 | "Back Street Boy" | — | — | — | Reckless Valentine |
| 1996 | "Beautiful Disguise" | — | — | — | Cool Jam Black Earth |
| 1997 | "I Will Be Your Priest" | — | — | — | Cool Jam Black Earth |
| 1999 | "Charlie Parker Loves Me" | — | — | — | This Is How Men Cry |
| 2002 | "Rockets" | — | — | — | Living in Marina del Rey and Other Stories |
| 2003 | "Everything Love Is" (with Amy Sky) | — | — | — | With This Kiss (Amy Sky album) |
| 2008 | "Every Time It Snows" | — | — | — | single only |
| 2012 | "Your Love Was All" | — | — | — | Crucifix in Dreamland |

== Writing credits ==
A list of artists who have performed songs written by Jordan include the following:

- Alfie Zappacosta – Tears of Hercules
- Susan Aglukark
- Jim Brickman
- Cher
- Chicago
- Joe Cocker
- Holly Cole
- Natalie Cole
- Shawn Colvin
- Renée Geyer
- Josh Groban
- Molly Johnson
- David Hasselhoff
- Jeff Healey
- Don Johnson
- Kansas
- Kenny Loggins
- The Manhattan Transfer
- Amanda Marshall
- Iain Matthews
- Olivia Newton-John
- The Nylons
- Robert Priest
- Bonnie Raitt
- Diana Ross
- Runrig
- Sawyer Brown
- René Shuman
- Amy Sky
- Rod Stewart
- Tiffany
- Kim Carnes
- Keith Harkin
- John Paul Young
