= 1941 in music =

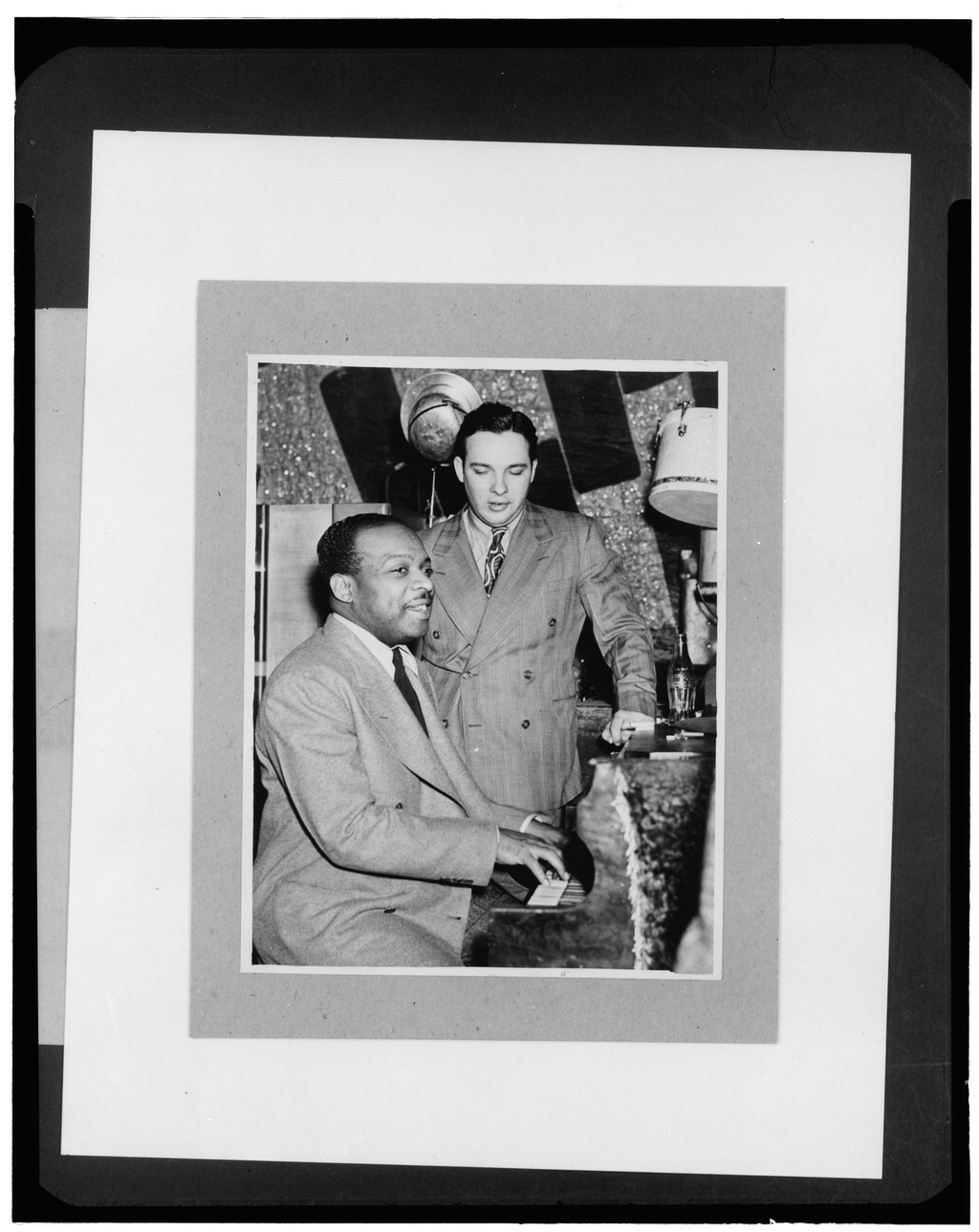
Portrait of Count Basie and Bob Crosby, Howard Theater, Washington, D.C., 1941.

This is a list of notable events in music that took place in the year 1941.

== Specific locations ==
- 1941 in British music
- 1941 in Norwegian music

== Specific genres ==
- 1941 in country music
- 1941 in jazz

== Events ==
- January 5 – Ernesto Bonino makes his début on Italian radio.
- January 15 – Olivier Messiaen's Quatuor pour la fin du temps is premiered by the composer and fellow prisoners-of-war in Stalag VIII-A in Silesia.
- January 20 – Béla Bartók's String Quartet No. 6 is premièred in New York City.
- May
  - Front National des Musiciens established in Nazi-occupied France by Elsa Barraine and others as part of the French Resistance.
  - Woody Guthrie writes and records "Roll On, Columbia, Roll On" and "Grand Coulee Dam" among other folk songs in Portland, Oregon on a commission from the Bonneville Power Administration; these are released as Columbia River Collection.
- May 10 – London's Queen's Hall, venue for The Proms, is bombed by the Luftwaffe. The concert series relocates to the Royal Albert Hall.
- August 18 – In a brutal police operation in Nazi Germany, over 300 Swingjugend ("Swing kids") are arrested, marking the end of tolerance to swing music.
- date unknown
  - Alan Lomax (working for the Library of Congress) discovers Muddy Waters and Son House, among others
  - Les Paul almost electrocutes himself while attempting to build the first solid-body electric guitar.
  - Enrico Gentile leaves Quartetto Ritmo. Felice Chiusano replaces him and the group is renamed Quartetto Cetra.
  - Dutch Leschan sisters of Trio Lescano become Italian citizens.
  - The National Negro Opera Company is launched in Pittsburgh, USA.
  - Virgil Thomson's Four Saints in Three Acts is presented at Town Hall in New York City.

== Albums released ==
- Songs for John Doe – The Almanac Singers
- Okeh Presents the Wayfaring Stranger – Burl Ives
- Small Fry – Bing Crosby
- Hawaii Calls – Bing Crosby, Frances Langford, Harry Owens
- Crosbyana – Bing Crosby
- Four Star Favorites – Artie Shaw

== Top Popular Recordings 1941 ==
The following songs appeared in The Billboard's 'Best Selling Retail Records' chart during 1941. Each week fifteen points were awarded to the number one record, then nine points for number two, eight points for number three, and so on. The total points a record earned determined its year-end rank. Regional charts determined the 11–25 rankings each week, and records that failed to score on the main chart were ranked by highest position. Additional information was obtained from the "Discography of American Historical Recordings" website, Joel Whitburn's Pop Memories 1890–1954 and other sources as specified.

The following songs appeared in The Billboard's 'Best Selling Retail Records' chart during 1941.

Rank	Artist	Title	Label	Recorded	Released	Chart positions
1	Glenn Miller and His Orchestra	"Chattanooga Choo Choo"	Bluebird 11230	May 7, 1941	July 25, 1941	US BB 1941 #1, US #1 for 9 weeks, 28 total weeks, 253 points, Grammy Hall of Fame 1996, ASCAP song of 1941, Oscar Nomination 1941 (film 'Sun Valley Serenade')
2	Freddy Martin and His Orchestra	"Piano Concerto In B Flat"	Bluebird 11211	June 16, 1941	July 3, 1941	US BB 1941 #2, US #1 for 8 weeks, 26 total weeks, 230 points
3	Jimmy Dorsey and His Orchestra	"Amapola (Pretty Little Poppy)"	Decca 3629	February 3, 1941	February 1941	US BB 1941 #3, US #1 for 10 weeks, 18 total weeks, 171 points, 1,000,000 sales
4	Swing And Sway With Sammy Kaye	"Daddy"	Victor 27391	March 31, 1941	April 25, 1941	US BB 1941 #4, US #1 for 8 weeks, 19 total weeks, 170 points
5	Jimmy Dorsey and His Orchestra	"Green Eyes"	Decca 3698	March 19, 1941	April 1941	US BB 1941 #5, US #1 for 4 weeks, 28 total weeks, 153 points, 1,000,000 sales
6	Jimmy Dorsey and his Orchestra	"Maria Elena"	Decca 3698	March 19, 1941	April 1941	US BB 1941 #6, US #1 for 2 weeks, 19 total weeks, 142 points, 1,000,000 sales
7	Glenn Miller and his Orchestra	"Elmer's Tune"	Bluebird 11274	August 11, 1941	August 29, 1941	US BB 1941 #7, US #1 for 1 week, 21 total weeks, 126 points
8	Tommy Dorsey and His Orchestra (Vocal Frank Sinatra)	"This Love of Mine"	Victor 27508	May 28, 1941	July 11, 1941	US BB 1941 #8, US #3 for 4 weeks, 27 total weeks, 111 points
9	Jimmy Dorsey and his Orchestra	"Blue Champagne"	Decca 3775	April 29, 1941	June 1941	US BB 1941 #9, US #1 for 1 week, 20 total weeks, 84 points
10	Tommy Dorsey and His Orchestra (Vocal Frank Sinatra & Connie Haines & Pied Pipers)	"Oh Look At Me Now"	Victor 27274	January 16, 1941	February 1941	US BB 1941 #10, US #2 for 6 weeks, 14 total weeks, 81 points
11	Jimmy Dorsey and his Orchestra	"My Sister and I"	Decca 3710	March 19, 1941	April 1941	US 1941 #11, US #1 for 2 weeks, 13 total weeks, 79 points
12	Horace Heidt And His Musical Knights	"I Don't Want To Set The World On Fire"	Columbia 36295	July 24, 1941	August 1941	US BB 1941 #12, US #2 for 2 week, 17 total weeks, 77 points
13	Charlie Barnet and his Orchestra	"I Hear a Rhapsody"	Bluebird 10934	October 14, 1940	November 1940	US BB 1941 #13, US #2 for 6 weeks, 18 total weeks, 76 points
14	Tommy Dorsey and His Orchestra	"Yes, Indeed!"	Victor 27421	February 17, 1941	May 23, 1941	US BB 1941 #14, US #4 for 3 weeks, 24 total weeks, 73 points
15	Jimmy Dorsey and his Orchestra	"Yours"	Decca 3657	February 3, 1941	March 1941	US BB 1941 #15, US #2 for 2 weeks, 18 total weeks, 73 points
16	Xavier Cugat and His Waldorf-Astoria Orchestra	"Perfidia (Tonight)"	Victor 26334	December 19, 1940	January 7, 1941	US BB 1941 #16, US #3 for 4 weeks, 16 total weeks, 70 points
17	Jimmy Dorsey and his Orchestra	"I Hear A Rhapsody"	Decca 3570	October 14, 1940	November 1940	US BB 1941 #17, US #3 for 4 weeks, 10 total weeks, 55 points
18	Glenn Miller and his Orchestra	"Song Of The Volga Boatmen"	Bluebird 11029	April 24, 1941	February 1941	US BB 1941 #18, US #1 for 1 week, 10 total weeks, 53 points
19	Freddy Martin and his Orchestra	"The Hut-Sut Song (A Swedish Serenade)"	Bluebird 11147	April 24, 1941	May 16, 1941	US BB 1941 #19, US #2 for 1 week, 13 total weeks, 53 points
20	Bing Crosby	"Dolores"	Decca 3644	December 23, 1940	February 1941	US BB 1941 #20, US #2 for 1 week, 15 total weeks, 52 points

Additional recordings of historical interest, and songs that crossed over from Hillbilly (Country) and Race (R&B):

Rank	Artist	Title	Label	Recorded	Released	Chart positions
23	Andrews Sisters	"(I'll Be with You) In Apple Blossom Time"	Decca 3622	November 14, 1940	February 1941	US BB 1941 #23, US #5 for 5 weeks, 18 total weeks, 48 points
25	Harry James and His Orchestra	"You Made Me Love You"	Columbia 36296	May 20, 1941	August 1941	US BB 1941 #25, US #5 for 2 weeks, 22 total weeks, 41 points, Grammy Hall of Fame 2010
46	Artie Shaw and His Orchestra	"Star Dust"	Victor 27230	October 7, 1940	December 6, 1940	US 1941 #46, US #6 for 1 week, 10 total weeks, 12 points, Grammy Hall of Fame 1988
56	Bing Crosby	"San Antonio Rose"	Decca 3590	December 16, 1940	February 1941	US BB 1941 #56, US #7 for 1 week, 12 total weeks, 9 points, 1,000,000 sales
87	Bob Wills and His Texas Playboys	"New San Antonio Rose"	OKeh 05694	April 16, 1940	August 1940	US BB 1941 #87, US #11 for 2 weeks, 18 total weeks, US Hillbilly 1940 #9, USHB #1 for 2 weeks, 29 total weeks, 1,000,000 sales, Grammy Hall of Fame 1998, Library of Congress artifact added 2003
86	Dinah Shore	"Yes, My Darling Daughter"	Bluebird 10920	October 4, 1940	November 8, 1940	US BB 1941 #86, US #11 for 4 weeks, 10 total weeks
88	Andrews Sisters	"Boogie Woogie Bugle Boy"	Decca 3598	January 2, 1941	January 20, 1941	US BB 1941 #88, US #11 for 1 week, 7 total weeks, Grammy Hall of Fame in 2000
91	Duke Ellington and His Famous Orchestra	"Take the "A" Train"	Victor 27380	February 15, 1941	April 11, 1941	US BB 1941 #91, US #12 for 1 week, 9 total weeks, Grammy Hall of Fame 1976
95	Larry Clinton and His Orchestra	"Because of You"	Bluebird 11094	December 12, 1940	March 28, 1941	US 1941 #95, US #12 for 1 week, 1 total weeks
99	Louise Massey and the Westerners	"My Adobe Hacienda"	Okeh 6077	January 27, 1941	March 1941	US BB 1941 #99, US #13 for 1 week, 1 total weeks, US Hillbilly 1941 #10, USHB #1 for 1 week, 21 total weeks
131	Gene Autry	"You Are My Sunshine"	Okeh 6274	June 18, 1941	July 10, 1941	US BB 1941 #131, US #16 for 1 week, 1 total weeks, US Hillbilly 1941 #1, USHB #1 for 20 weeks, 50 total weeks, 1,000,000 sales
142	Sons of the Pioneers	"Cool Water"	Decca 5939	March 27, 1941	April 1941	US BB 1941 #142, US #17 for 1 week, 1 total weeks, US Hillbilly 1941 #12, USHB #1 for 1 week, 18 total weeks
167	Bing Crosby	"You Are My Sunshine"	Decca 3952	July 8, 1941	August 1941	US BB 1941 #167, US #19 for 1 week, 1 total weeks
147	Gene Autry	"Be Honest with Me"	Okeh 5980	August 20, 1940	January 17, 1941	US BB 1941 #147, US #17 for 1 week, 1 total weeks, US Hillbilly 1941 #3, USHB #1 for 6 weeks, 58 total weeks
154	Ernest Tubb	"Walking the Floor Over You"	Decca 5958	April 26, 1941	May 28, 1941	US BB 1941 #154, US #18 for 1 week, 1 total weeks, US Hillbilly 1941 #2, USHB #1 for 10 weeks, 72 total weeks
251	Bing Crosby	"It Makes No Difference Now"	Decca 3590	December 16, 1940	February 1941	US BB 1941 #251, US #23 for 1 week, 1 total weeks

== Published popular music ==
- "All That Meat and No Potatoes" words and music: Fats Waller & Ed Kirkeby
- "The Anniversary Waltz" w. Al Dubin m. Dave Franklin
- "Apollo Jump" m. Ernest Puree, Prince Robinson & Lucius "Lucky" Millinder
- "Arthur Murray Taught Me Dancing In A Hurry" w. Johnny Mercer m. Victor Schertzinger
- "Baby Mine" w. Ned Washington m. Frank Churchill nominated for Oscar, from the animated feature Dumbo
- "Be Honest With Me" w.m. Fred Rose & Gene Autry
- "Blue Champagne" w.m. Jimmy Eaton, Grady Watts & Frank Ryerson
- "Blues in the Night" w. Johnny Mercer m. Harold Arlen
- "Boa Noite" w. Mack Gordon m. Harry Warren
- "Boogie Woogie Bugle Boy" w.m. Don Raye & Hughie Prince
- "Botch-A-Me" w. (Eng) Eddie Stanley (Ital) R. Morbelli & L. Astore m. R. Morbelli & L. Astore
- "Casey Junior" w. Ned Washington m. Frank Churchill from the animated feature Dumbo
- "Chattanooga Choo Choo" w. Mack Gordon m. Harry Warren
- "Cherry" w.m. Charles N. Daniels
- "Chica Chica Boom Chic" w. Mack Gordon m. Harry Warren
- "Could You Please Oblige Us with a Bren Gun?" w.m. Noël Coward
- "Daddy" w.m. Bobby Troup
- "Deep in the Heart of Texas" w. June Hershey m. Don Swander
- "Down Forget-Me-Not Lane" w.m. Horatio Nicholls, Charlie Chester & Reg Morgan
- "Elmer's Tune" w.m. Elmer Albrecht, Sammy Gallop & Dick Jurgens
- "Five Guys Named Moe" w. Larry Wynn m. Jerry Bresler
- "God Bless The Child" w.m. Arthur Herzog Jr & Billie Holiday
- "Goodbye Mama, I'm Off To Yokohama" w.m. J. Fred Coots
- "He Wears a Pair of Silver Wings" w. Eric Maschwitz m. Michael Carr
- "Hey Little Hen" w.m. Ralph Butler & Noel Gay
- "How About You?" w. Ralph Freed m. Burton Lane
- "Humpty Dumpty Heart" w. Johnny Burke m. Jimmy Van Heusen
- "The Hut-Sut Song" w.m. Leo V. Killion, Ted McMichael & Jack Owens, The Cruising Crooner
- "I Could Write a Book" w. Lorenz Hart m. Richard Rodgers. Introduced by Gene Kelly and Leila Ernst in the musical Pal Joey. Performed in the 1953 film version by Frank Sinatra.
- "I Don't Want To Set The World On Fire" w.m. Eddie Seiler, Sol Marcus, Bennie Benjamin & Eddie Durham
- "I Dreamt I Dwelt in Harlem" w. Buddy Feyne m. Jerry Gray, Leonard Ware & Ben Smith
- "I Don't Want To Walk Without You" w. Frank Loesser m. Jule Styne
- "I Got It Bad (And That Ain't Good)" w. Paul Francis Webster m. Duke Ellington
- "I Know Why (And So Do You)" w. Mack Gordon m. Harry Warren
- "I Remember You" w. Johnny Mercer m. Victor Schertzinger
- "I Said No!" w. Frank Loesser m. Jule Styne
- "I, Yi, Yi, Yi, Yi" w. Mack Gordon m. Harry Warren
- "I'll Remember April" w. Don Raye & Patricia Johnston m. Gene De Paul
- "I'm Glad There Is You" w.m. Jimmy Dorsey & Paul Madeira Mertz
- "Introduction to a Waltz" m. Glenn Miller, Jerry Gray & Hal Dickinson
- "It Happened In Sun Valley" w. Mack Gordon m. Harry Warren
- "It's So Peaceful In The Country" w.m. Alec Wilder
- "I Understand" w. Kim Gannon m. Mabel Wayne
- "I've Got Sixpence" w.m. Elton Box & Desmond Cox
- "Jenny" (aka "The Saga of Jenny") w. Ira Gershwin m. Kurt Weill. Introduced by Gertrude Lawrence in the musical Lady in the Dark. Performed in the 1944 film version by Ginger Rogers
- "Jim" w. Nelson Shawn m. Caesar Petrillo & Edward Ross
- "Kiss The Boys Goodbye" w. Frank Loesser m. Victor Schertzinger
- "Let's All Meet At My House" w. Johnny Burke m. Jimmy Van Heusen
- "Let's Get Away from It All" w. Tom Adair m. Matt Dennis
- "Let's Not Talk About Love" w.m. Cole Porter
- "London Pride" w.m. Noël Coward
- "Ma! I Miss Your Apple Pie" w.m. Carmen Lombardo & John Jacob Loeb
- "Misirlou" w. (Eng) Milton Leeds, S. K. Russell & Fred Wise m. N. Roubanis
- "Moonlight Cocktail" w. Kim Gannon m. C. Luckeyth "Lucky" Roberts
- "My Adobe Hacienda" w.m. Louise Massey & Lee Penny
- "My Ship" w. Ira Gershwin m. Kurt Weill
- "My Sister and I" w.m. Hy Zaret, Joan Whitney & Alex Kramer
- "Oh! Look at Me Now" w. John DeVries m. Joe Bushkin
- "Racing With The Moon" w. Vaughn Monroe & Pauline Pope m. Johnny Watson
- "Rancho Pillow" Charles Newman & Allie Wrubel
- "Remember Pearl Harbor" w.m. Don Reid & Sammy Kaye
- "Road To Zanzibar" w. Johnny Burke m. Jimmy Van Heusen from the film Road To Zanzibar
- "Rose O'Day" w.m. Charles Tobias & Al Lewis
- "Sand In My Shoes" w. Frank Loesser m. Victor Schertzinger
- "The Shrine Of Saint Cecilia" w. Carroll Loveday m. Nils Perne (Jokern)
- "A Sinner Kissed An Angel" w. Mack David m. Larry Shayne
- "Someone's Rocking My Dreamboat" w.m. Leon René, Otis René & Emerson Scott
- "So Near and Yet So Far" w.m. Cole Porter. Introduced by Fred Astaire in the film You'll Never Get Rich.
- "Starlight Serenade" w.m. Sonny Miller, Frederick Tysh & Hans May
- "The Story Of A Starry Night" w.m. Jerry Livingston, Al Hoffman & Mann Curtis
- "A String Of Pearls" w. Eddie De Lange m. Jerry Gray
- "Sun Valley Jump" m. Jerry Gray from the film Sun Valley Serenade
- "Take The "A" Train" w.m. Billy Strayhorn
- "Tangerine" w. Johnny Mercer m. Victor Schertzinger
- "That Lovely Weekend" w.m. Ted Heath & Moira Heath
- "There Goes That Song Again" Allie Wrubel
- "There, I've Said It Again" w.m. Redd Evans & Dave Mann
- "This Is New" w. Ira Gershwin m. Kurt Weill
- "This Time the Dream's on Me" w. Johnny Mercer m. Harold Arlen. Introduced by Priscilla Lane in the film Blues in the Night.
- "Tonight We Love" w. Bobby Worth m. Freddy Martin & Ray Austin
- "Tschaikovsky (And Other Russians)" w. Ira Gershwin m. Kurt Weill. Introduced by Danny Kaye in the musical Lady in the Dark
- "Two In Love" w.m. Meredith Willson
- "The Waiter And The Porter And The Upstairs Maid" w.m Johnny Mercer
- "Walking the Floor Over You" w.m. Ernest Tubb
- "We're The Couple In The Castle" w. Frank Loesser m. Hoagy Carmichael
- "When I Love I Love" w. Mack Gordon m. Harry Warren
- "When I See an Elephant Fly" w. Ned Washington m. Oliver Wallace
- "When They Sound The Last All Clear" w.m. Hughie Charles, Louis Elton
- "(There'll Be Bluebirds Over) The White Cliffs of Dover" w. Nat Burton m. Walter Kent
- "Why Don't We Do This More Often?" w. Charles Newman m. Allie Wrubel
- "Winter Weather" w.m. Ted Shapiro
- "You And I" w.m. Meredith Willson
- "You Don't Know What Love Is" w. Don Raye m. Gene De Paul

== Other publications ==
- Robert van Gulik – The Lore of the Chinese Lute: An Essay in Ch'in Ideology

== Classical music ==
=== Premieres ===
Composer	Composition	Date	Location	Performers
Alwyn, William	Pastoral Fantasia for Viola and Orchestra	1941-11-03	Bedford, UK	Forbes / BBC Symphony – Boult
Barber, Samuel	Violin Concerto	1941-02-07	Philadelphia	Spalding / Philadelphia Orchestra – Ormandy
Bartók, Béla	String Quartet No. 6	1941-02-07	New York City	Kolisch Quartet
Britten, Benjamin	Matinées musicales	1941-06-27	Rio de Janeiro	American Ballet Company Orchestra – Balaban
Britten, Benjamin	Sinfonia da Requiem	1941-03-30	New York City	New York Philharmonic – Barbirolli
Britten, Benjamin	String Quartet No. 1	1941-09-21	Los Angeles	Coolidge Quartet
Copland, Aaron	Piano Sonata	1941-10-21	Buenos Aires	Copland
Dallapiccola, Luigi	Canti di prigionia	1941-12-11	Rome	[unknown ensemble] – Previtali
Dallapiccola, Luigi	Piccolo concerto per Muriel Couvreux	1941-05-01	Rome	[unknown ensemble] – Previtali
Ginastera, Alberto	Concierto argentino	1941-07-18	Montevideo, Uruguay	Balzo / SODRE Symphony – Baldi
Herrmann, Bernard	Symphony	1941-07-27	New York City	CBS Symphony – Herrmann
Hindemith, Paul	Cello Concerto	1941-02-07	Boston	Piatigorsky / Boston Symphony – Koussevitzky
Messiaen, Olivier	Quatuor pour la fin du temps	1941-01-15	Görlitz, Germany	Le Boulaire, Akoka, Pasquier, Messiaen
Novák, Vítězslav	De Profundis	1941-11-20	Brno, Czechoslovakia	Reinberger / Prague Radio Symphony – Bakala
Rachmaninoff, Sergei	Symphonic Dances	1941-01-03	Philadelphia	Philadelphia Orchestra – Ormandy
Schuman, William	Symphony No. 3	1941-10-17	Boston	Boston Symphony – Koussevitzky

=== Compositions ===
- Joseph Achron – Concerto for Piano Solo
- Richard Addinsell – Warsaw Concerto
- Hanns Eisler – Vierzehn Arten den Regen zu Beschreiben (Fourteen Ways of Describing the Rain)
- Roberto Gerhard – Sinfonía homenaje a Pedrell
- Reinhold Glière – Pochodnyj marš (Field march) for wind orchestra, op. 76
- Paul Hindemith – English Horn Sonata (premiered November 23 in New York City)
- Vagn Holmboe – Symphony No. 3, Sinfonia rustica
  - Symphony No. 4, Sinfonia sacra
- Wilhelm Kienzl – String Quartet No.3, Op.113
- Olivier Messiaen – Quatour pour la fin du temps
- Harry Partch – Barstow
- Sergei Prokofiev – String Quartet No. 2 in F, Op. 92
- Sergei Rachmaninoff – Lullaby (Paraphrase of Tchaikovsky's "Cradle Song" Op. 16 No. 1)
- Dmitri Shostakovich – Symphony No. 7 C major, Op. 60 "Leningrad"
- Lukas Foss – Concerto No. 1 for clarinet and orchestra

== Opera ==
- Benjamin Britten – Paul Bunyan
- Miguel Bernal Jiménez – Tata Vasco
- William Grant Still – A Bayou Legend, with libretto by Verna Arvey

== Film ==
- Bernard Herrmann – Citizen Kane
- Bernard Herrmann – The Devil and Daniel Webster
- Erich Korngold – The Sea Wolf
- Franz Waxman - Dr. Jekyll and Mr. Hyde
- Ralph Vaughan Williams – 49th Parallel

== Musical theatre ==
- Apple Sauce London revue opened at the Palladium on March 5
- Banjo Eyes Broadway production opened on December 25 at the Hollywood Theatre and ran for 126 performances.
- Best Foot Forward Broadway production opened on October 1 at the Ethel Barrymore Theatre and ran for 326 performances.
- Get a Load of This London production opened on November 19 at the Hippodrome Theatre and ran for 698 performances.
- High Kickers Broadway production opened on October 31 at the Broadhurst Theatre and ran for 171 performances.
- It Happens on Ice Broadway Revue opened on July 15 at the Center Theatre and ran for 386 performances.
- Lady Behave London production opened at His Majesty's Theatre on July 24 and ran for 401 performances
- Lady in the Dark Broadway production opened on January 23 at the Alvin Theatre and ran for 467 performances.
- Let's Face It! Broadway production opened on October 29 at the Imperial Theatre and ran for 547 performances.
- Sons O' Fun Broadway Revue opened on December 1 at the Winter Garden Theatre and ran for 742 performances.

== Musical films ==
- Alle gaar rundt og forelsker sig, starring Lilian Ellis
- Apavadu
- Babes on Broadway
- Birth of the Blues
- Blues in the Night
- The Chocolate Soldier
- Dumbo
- Háry János, starring Antal Páger and Margit Dajka
- He Found a Star starring Vic Oliver, Sarah Churchill and Evelyn Dall
- Hold That Ghost starring Bud Abbott and Lou Costello and featuring The Andrews Sisters and Ted Lewis and his Band
- In the Navy starring Bud Abbott, Lou Costello, Dick Powell and The Andrews Sisters
- Kiss the Boys Goodbye starring Don Ameche and Mary Martin
- Lady Be Good
- Moon Over Miami
- Navy Blues starring Ann Sheridan, Jack Oakie, Martha Raye and Jack Haley
- Playmates
- Rise and Shine starring Jack Oakie, Linda Darnell, George Murphy and Milton Berle
- Road to Zanzibar
- San Antonio Rose starring Robert Paige, Jane Frazee, Eve Arden and The Merry Macs
- Sis Hopkins starring Judy Canova, Bob Crosby, Jerry Colonna and Susan Hayward
- Smilin' Through
- Sun Valley Serenade
- Sunny
- Sweetheart of the Campus
- That Certain Something
- That Night in Rio
- They Met in Argentina
- Time Out for Rhythm
- Too Many Blondes starring Rudy Vallee and Helen Parrish
- Week-End in Havana
- You'll Never Get Rich starring Fred Astaire, Rita Hayworth and Robert Benchley. Directed by Sidney Lanfield.
- You're the One starring Bonnie Baker, Orrin Tucker & his Orchestra, Edward Everett Horton and Jerry Colonna
- Ziegfeld Girl
- Zis Boom Bah starring Grace Hayes, Peter Lind Hayes, Mary Healy, Skeets Gallagher and Benny Rubin, and directed by William Nigh

== Births ==
- January 8 – Little Anthony, American R&B vocalist (Little Anthony & the Imperials)
- January 9
  - Joan Baez, folk singer
  - Roy Head, singer-songwriter and guitarist (died 2020)
- January 11 – Dave Edwards, American musician (died 2000)
- January 12 – Long John Baldry, R&B singer (Blues Incorporated) (died 2005)
- January 15 – Captain Beefheart, musician and artist (died 2010)
- January 18 – David Ruffin, soul singer (The Temptations) (died 1991)
- January 20 – Ron Townson, pop singer (The 5th Dimension) (died 2001)
- January 21
  - Plácido Domingo, operatic tenor
  - Richie Havens, folk singer (died 2013)
- January 24
  - Michael Chapman, folk guitarist and singer-songwriter (died 2021)
  - Neil Diamond, singer-songwriter
  - Aaron Neville, R&B and soul vocalist and musician (The Neville Brothers)
- January 27 – Bobby Hutcherson, American jazz musician (died 2016)
- January 28 – Cash McCall, American singer-songwriter and guitarist (died 2010)
- February 4 – John Steel, rock drummer The Animals
- February 5
  - Henson Cargill, country singer (died 2007)
  - Barrett Strong, Motown singer-songwriter (died 2023)
  - Cory Wells, rock singer (Three Dog Night) (died 2015)
- February 11
  - Earl Lewis, doo-wop singer-songwriter (The Channels)
  - Sérgio Mendes, Brazilian keyboard player and Latin American musician (died 2024)
  - Tom Rush, folk & blues singer
- February 12 – Dominguinhos, Brazilian composer, accordionist and singer (died 2013)
- February 15 – Brian Holland, songwriter
- February 17 – Gene Pitney, pop singer-songwriter (died 2006)
- February 18
  - Herman Santiago, rock & roll singer-songwriter (Frankie Lymon & The Teenagers)
  - Irma Thomas, soul singer
- February 20 – Buffy Sainte-Marie, singer and composer
- February 24 – Joanie Sommers, singer and actress
- March 5 – Alain Boublil, librettist
- March 6 – Palle Mikkelborg, jazz trumpeter and composer
- March 8 – Ivana Loudová, composer (died 2017)
- March 12 – Paul Kantner, psychedelic rock guitarist (Jefferson Airplane, KBC Band) (died 2016)
- March 15 – Mike Love, rock singer (The Beach Boys)
- March 18 – Wilson Pickett, soul singer (died 2006)
- March 22 – Jeremy Clyde, singer (Chad and Jeremy)
- March 24 – Michael Masser, songwriter, composer and producer of popular music (died 2015)
- March 28 – Alf Clausen, orchestra conductor (The Simpsons)
- March 30 – Graeme Edge (The Moody Blues) (died 2021)
- April 3
  - Jan Berry, American singer (Jan & Dean) (died 2004)
  - Jorma Hynninen, Finnish baritone
  - Philippé Wynne, American musician (died 1984)
- April 5
  - David LaFlamme, born Gary Posie, American classical and rock violinist (It's a Beautiful Day)
  - Dave Swarbrick, English folk rock fiddle player (Fairport Convention) (died 2016)
- April 9 – Kay Adams, American country singer
- April 17 – Adolphus Hailstork, American composer and educator
- April 19 – Roberto Carlos, Brazilian singer
- April 21 – Jim Owen, American country singer-songwriter (died 2020)
- April 22 – Dieter Kaufmann, Austrian composer (died 2025)
- April 28
  - Peter Anders, American songwriter (The Tradewinds)
  - Ann-Margret, Swedish-born American actress and singer
- April 30 – Johnny Farina, American rock and roll musician (Santo & Johnny)
- May 4 – Richard Burns (The Hondells)
- May 8 – John Fred, vocalist (John Fred & His Playboy Band) (died 2005)
- May 9
  - Peter Birrell (Freddie & The Dreamers)
  - Danny Rapp, American singer (Danny and the Juniors) (died 1983)
- May 11 – Eric Burdon, R&B singer (The Animals)
- May 13
  - Joe Brown, singer and guitarist
  - Ritchie Valens, singer (died 1959)
- May 18 – Lobby Loyde, Australian guitarist, songwriter and producer (Billy Thorpe & the Aztecs, Purple Hearts, Wild Cherries and Rose Tattoo) (died 2007)
- May 21 – Ronald Isley (The Isley Brothers)
- May 24
  - Konrad Boehmer, composer
  - Bob Dylan, folk singer-songwriter
- May 27 – Teppo Hauta-aho, Finnish double bassist and composer
- June 1 – Edo de Waart, conductor
- June 2
  - William Guest, R&B/soul singer (Gladys Knight & the Pips) (died 2015)
  - Charlie Watts, rock drummer (The Rolling Stones) (died 2021)
- June 5 – Martha Argerich, pianist
- June 7 – Jaime Laredo, Bolivian-American violinist and conductor
- June 8 – Fuzzy Haskins, musician (died 2023)
- June 9 – Jon Lord, rock keyboard player and composer (Deep Purple) (died 2012)
- June 10
  - Mickey Jones, rock drummer and character actor (died 2018)
  - Shirley Owens, soul singer (The Shirelles)
  - Aida Vedishcheva, Soviet and Russian singer
- June 12
  - Chick Corea, jazz musician (died 2021)
  - Roy Harper, folk rock singer-songwriter
  - Reg Presley, rock singer-songwriter (The Troggs) (died 2013)
- June 13 – Esther Ofarim, singer
- June 15 – Harry Nilsson, singer-songwriter (died 1994)
- June 16 – Lamont Dozier, songwriter (died 2022)
- June 23 – Robert Hunter, American singer-songwriter and guitarist (The Grateful Dead) (died 2019)
- June 24 – Erkin Koray, Turkish musician
- July 5 – Terry Cashman, record producer and singer-songwriter
- July 16 – Desmond Dekker, reggae musician (died 2006)
- July 17
  - Spencer Davis, instrumentalist (The Spencer Davis Group) (died 2020)
  - Gribouille, chanteuse (died 1968)
- July 18
  - Lonnie Mack, rock and blues guitarist (died 2016)
  - Martha Reeves, vocalist
- July 19 – Vicki Carr, singer
- July 22
  - Estelle Bennett (The Ronettes) (died 2009)
  - George Clinton, American musician
- July 25 – Manny Charlton, hard rock lead guitarist and record producer (Nazareth) (died 2022)
- July 26 – Brenton Wood, singer-songwriter
- July 27 – Johannes Fritsch, composer and violist (died 2010)
- July 28 – Riccardo Muti, conductor
- July 30 – Paul Anka, singer-songwriter
- August 2 – Doris Coley (The Shirelles) (died 2000)
- August 3 – Beverly Lee (The Shirelles)
- August 14
  - David Crosby, rock singer-songwriter (The Byrds, Crosby, Stills & Nash) (died 2023)
  - Connie Smith, country singer-songwriter
- August 20 – Dave Brock (Hawkwind)
- August 21
  - Tom Coster (Santana)
  - Jackie DeShannon, singer-songwriter
- August 22 – Marvell Thomas, African-American Memphis blues keyboardist (died 2017)
- August 24 – Kenny Rogers, country musician (died 2020)
- August 26 – Chris Curtis (The Searchers) (died 2005)
- August 27 – Cesária Évora, morna vocalist (died 2011)
- August 28 – Joseph Shabalala, choral director (Ladysmith Black Mambazo) (died 2020)
- August 30 – John McNally (The Searchers)
- September 9 – Otis Redding, soul singer (died 1967)
- September 10 – Christopher Hogwood, conductor and harpsichordist (died 2014)
- September 13 – David Clayton-Thomas, vocalist (Blood, Sweat & Tears) (died 2026)
- September 14
  - Alberto Naranjo, arranger and composer (died 2020)
  - James Anthony Carmichael, American musician
- September 19 – Cass Elliot, singer (died 1974)
- September 24 – Linda McCartney (Wings) (died 1998)
- September 26 – Salvatore Accardo, Italian violinist and conductor
- October 2 – Ron Meagher (The Beau Brummels)
- October 3 – Chubby Checker, singer
- October 4 – Mighty Shadow, Trinidadian calypsonian (died 2018)
- October 13 – Paul Simon, singer-songwriter
- October 17
  - Alan Howard (The Tremeloes)
  - James Seals (Seals and Crofts) (died 2022)
- October 21 – Steve Cropper, R&B guitarist and songwriter (Booker T. & the M.G.'s) (died 2025)
- October 24 – Helen Reddy, singer (died 2020)
- October 28
  - Curtis Lee, singer (died 2015)
  - Hank Marvin, guitarist (The Shadows)
- October 30 – Otis Williams, vocalist (The Temptations)
- November 2
  - Brian Poole, singer (The Tremeloes)
  - Bruce Welch, guitarist and singer (The Shadows)
- November 5 – Art Garfunkel, singer (Simon and Garfunkel)
- November 6
  - James Bowman, countertenor (died 2023)
  - Guy Clark, folk singer-songwriter (died 2016)
  - Doug Sahm, Tex-Mex musician (Sir Douglas Quintet) (died 1999)
- November 8 – Simon Standage, baroque violinist
- November 9 – Tom Fogerty, rock rhythm guitarist (Creedence Clearwater Revival) (died 1990)
- November 13 – Odia Coates, singer (died 1991)
- November 16 – Dan Penn, American singer-songwriter and producer
- November 20 – Dr. John, American singer-songwriter and musician (died 2019)
- November 21 – David Porter, American soul musician
- November 24
  - Pete Best, rock drummer (The Beatles, original lineup)
  - Donald "Duck" Dunn, rock bass guitarist (Booker T. & the M.G.'s, The Blues Brothers) (died 2012)
- November 27 – Eddie Rabbitt, country singer-songwriter (Amos Garrett) (died 1998)
- November 29 – Denny Doherty, folk singer (The Mamas & the Papas) (died 2007)
- December 2 – Tom McGuinness, English pop guitarist (Manfred Mann)
- December 8 - Bobby Elliott, drummer (The Hollies)
- December 10
  - Kyu Sakamoto, Japanese singer and actor (died 1985)
  - Peter Sarstedt, Indian-born British singer-songwriter (died 2017)
  - Chad Stuart, English folk rock singer (Chad & Jeremy) (died 2020)
- December 12 – Tim Hauser, American singer (The Manhattan Transfer) (died 2014)
- December 18 – Sam Andrew, American rock musician (Big Brother & The Holding Company) (died 2015)
- December 19 – Maurice White, American R&B musician (Earth, Wind and Fire) (died 2016)
- December 27 – Mike Pinder, English rock keyboard player (The Moody Blues) (died 2024)
- December 29 – Ray Thomas, English rock flautist and singer-songwriter (The Moody Blues) (died 2018)

== Deaths ==
- January 7 – Louis Bousquet, composer and lyricist (born 1871)
- January 10 – Frank Bridge, composer, 61
- January 23 – Dobri Hristov, composer, 65
- February 5 – Miina Härma, Estonian organist, composer, and conductor, 76
- February 13 – Blind Boy Fuller, blues musician, 36 (sepsis)
- February 15 – Guido Adler, musicologist, 85
- February 19 – Sir Hamilton Harty, conductor and composer, 61
- February 21 – La Bolduc, Québécois singer, 46 (cancer)
- March 11 – Sir Henry Walford Davies, composer, 71
- March 12 – Ernst Décsey, music critic, 70
- March 17 – Wassily Sapellnikoff, pianist, 73
- March 20 – Oskar Baum, music teacher and writer, 58
- March 27 – Primo Riccitelli, Italian composer, 65
- April 6 – Henry Burr, Canadian popular singer, 59 (throat cancer)
- April 17 – Al Bowlly, popular singer, 43 (explosion)
- April 19 – Johanna Müller-Hermann, Austrian composer and teacher
- April 21
  - Agustín Bardi, tango composer, pianist and violinist, 56 (heart attack)
  - Emma Heckle, soprano, 91
- May 1
  - Julia Claussen, operatic mezzo-soprano, 62
  - Howard Johnson, lyricist
- May 18 – Milka Ternina, Croatian dramatic soprano
- May 23 – Slavko Osterc, Slovenian composer, 45
- May 30 – Edmund L. Gruber, composer (born 1879)
- June 17 – Johan Wagenaar, organist and composer, 78
- June 29 – Ignacy Jan Paderewski, pianist and composer, former Prime Minister of Poland, 80
- July 5 – Oskar Fried, conductor and composer
- July 8 – Philippe Gaubert, composer and conductor, 62
- July 10 – Jelly Roll Morton, jazz pianist, 55 (asthma)
- July 30 – Hugo Becker, cellist, 78
- August 16
  - John Coates, operatic tenor
  - Pauline Schöller, operatic soprano
- August 30 – Hong Nan-pa, composer, violinist, conductor, music critic and educator, 44
- September 18 – Louis Feuillard, French cellist and professor (born 1872)
- September 19 – Enrique Saborido, tango pianist and composer, 64
- October 2 – Jef Denyn, carillon player, 79
- October 3 – Wilhelm Kienzl, Austrian composer and conductor (born 1857)
- October 8
  - Helen Morgan, US singer and actress, 41 (cirrhosis of the liver)
  - Gus Kahn, US lyric writer, 54
- October 9 – Clara E. Thoms, pianist, soprano, and music educator, 82
- October 26 – Victor Schertzinger, violinist and composer, 53 (heart attack)
- October 29 – Edmée Favart, operatic soprano, 62
- October 30 – Leon "Chu" Berry, jazz saxophonist, 33 (car accident)
- November 1 – Félix Mayol, singer, 68
- November 16 – Miina Härma, organist and composer, 77
- November 17 – Edmond Haraucourt, lyricist (born 1856)
- November 25 – Henri Christiné, composer,
- November 29 – Gennaro Papi, Italian opera conductor, 54
- December 3 – Christian Sinding, composer, 85
- December 21 – Peetie Wheatstraw, blues singer, 39 (car accident)
- December 22 – Jurgis Karnavičius, composer, 57
- December 24 – Siegfried Alkan, composer, 83
- date unknown – William H. Potstock, music teacher and composer
