= Memaloose State Park =

State park in Oregon, United States

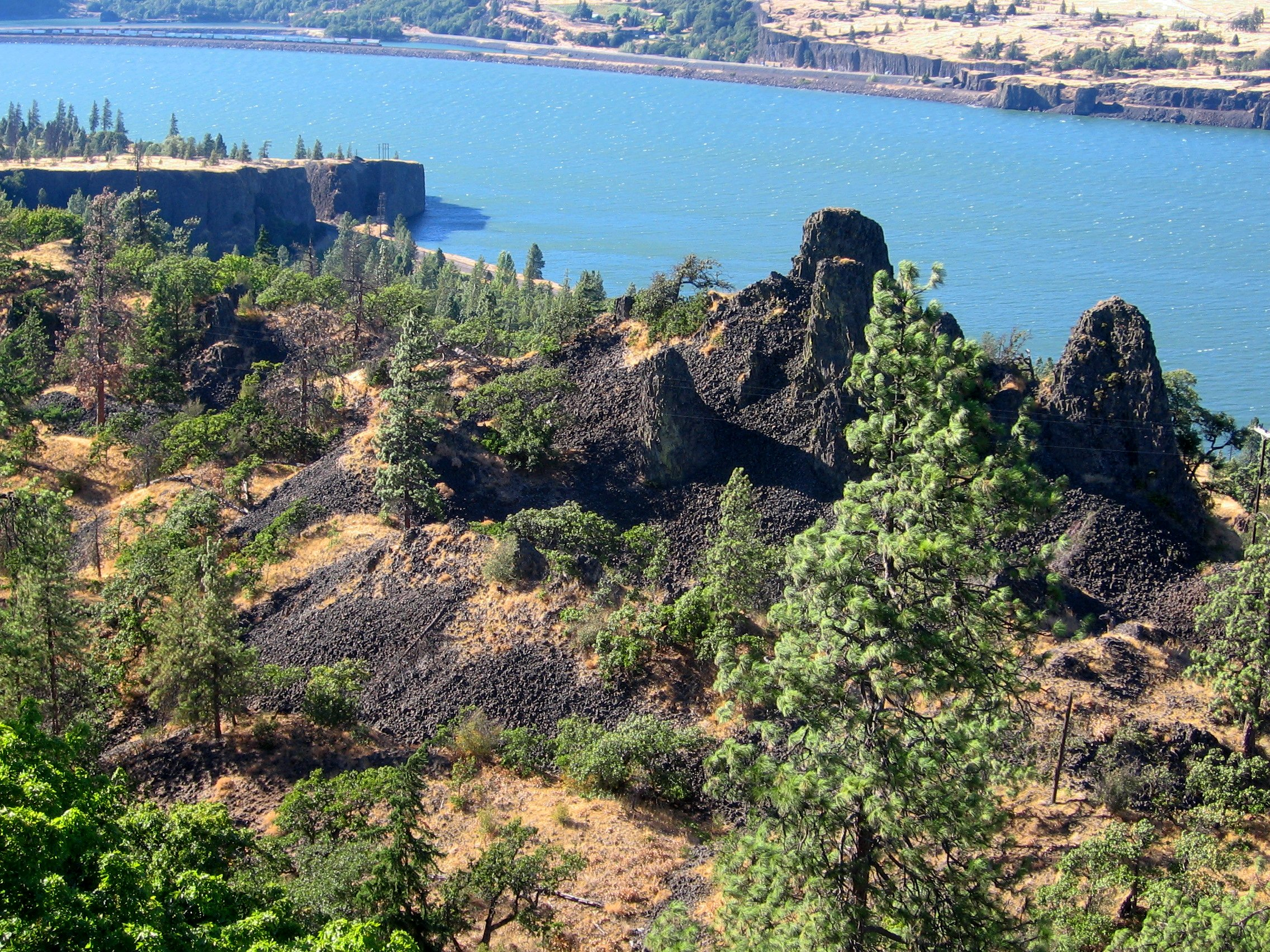
- The Columbia River at the park

- Location within Oregon Location within the United States
- Type: Public, state
- Location: Wasco County, Oregon
- Nearest city: Hood River
- Coordinates: 45°41′44″N 121°19′58″W
- Created: 1925
- Operator: Oregon Parks and Recreation Department

Memaloose State Park is a state park in the U.S. state of Oregon, 11 miles west of The Dalles and accessible via Interstate 84. Memaloose Island to the north is visible from the state park. Victor Trevitt, an early member of the Oregon Legislative Assembly, was buried on the island after his death in 1883; his grave marker is visible on the southern shore of the island.

== History ==
Prior to the arrival of Europeans, the island was long used as a Chinook burial ground. Rather than truly burying their dead, the Indian peoples wrapped the dead, placed them in canoes, and then left the canoes on the island, some inside cedar vaults.

The name is derived from "Memaloose Ilahee", the Chinook Jargon for "land of the dead". Memaloose Island was originally referred to as "Sepulcher Island" by American explorers Meriwether Lewis and William Clark in their 1804-1806 expedition.

The state park was established as Memaloose Island Overlook in 1925 on an initial land donation of 2.64 acres. It was further expanded in 1952 and 1953 as private land was purchased for the construction of I-84, with land not used for the freeway being transferred to the park.

Only about a third of the island as seen by Lewis and Clark is still visible above water. The rest of the island was flooded with the construction of Bonneville Dam further down river, completed in 1937.

Memaloose Island is mentioned in the 1941 folk song, "Roll on, Columbia, Roll on," by Woody Guthrie.

== See also ==
- List of Oregon state parks
