= Neva Krysteva =

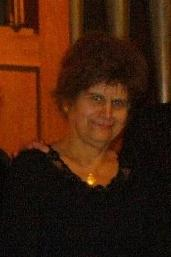
Neva Krysteva

Neva Krysteva (Bulgarian: Нева Кръстева; born 2 August 1946) is a Bulgarian organist, professor of music, pedagogue, composer from Moscow State Music Academy in Music Studies and Organ, and musicologist.

== Life ==
Born in Sofia, Bulgaria, Krysteva graduated from Moscow P. I. Tchaikovsky Conservatoire, or from Moscow State Music Academy in Music Studies and Organ, majoring in organ (in the Prof. Leonid Roizmann's class) and musicology. She continued her studies in Prague and Zürich with Prof. Jiří Reinberger, with Yuri Holopov for musicology and Leonid Royzman and Iri Reinberger for organ. Krysteva's career is separated in three general branches - organ performances, musicology and composition. In 1978 she organized the first organ class in Bulgaria.

After completing her education, Krasteva taught organ at the National Academy of Music in Bulgaria and became head of the organ classes at New Bulgarian University. She also works as a lecturer at the National Academy of Music. Krasteva has published a number of professional articles.

Neva Krysteva has given many concerts throughout Europe: (Italy, the Netherlands, Switzerland, Germany, Austria, Russia, Hungary, the Czech Republic, Slovakia, Romania) and in Asia. Her performing career in Bulgaria - her native country - starts in 1974, after the new pipe organ in Bulgaria Concert Hall in Sofia was installed. Her repertoire includes Baroque and Romantic music as well as 20th-century works.

Krysteva's compositions are in the sphere of organ, chamber and choral music.

== Works ==
Krasteva composes mostly solo and orchestra works for organ and choir. Selected works include:

- Рефлекси (Reflexi) (Text: after Johann Wolfgang von Goethe)
- Старата икона (Starata ikona) (Text: Ivan Minchov Vazov)
- Върхът (Varhat) (Text: Ivan Minchov Vazov)
