= Police Auxiliary Messengers =

Police Auxiliary Messengers (PAMS) were operational in the UK during World War 2. Young lads under the age of eighteen with their own bikes were employed by local police forces with the primary role of taking messages during and after air raids if telephone communication was not practicable.

== The police during WW2 ==
The police had a critical part to play as part of the civil defence arrangements during World War 2 for the UK. In addition to their normal duties they were responsible for enforcement of the blackout restrictions, monitoring enemy aliens, finding and arresting deserters, and dealing with drunken servicemen. They also attended all air raid incidents and depending on local civil defence arrangements would co-ordinate the response to a bombing. Most forces set up new sub-stations throughout their area. At the outbreak of War working in the Police was not regarded as a reserved occupation, although this changed in 1940, and many of the young constables joined up voluntarily or were conscripted; many constables were ex-servicemen who were called up as part of the forces reserve. The Police were also subject to a freeze on recruiting. They made up their numbers by recalling their own pensioner reservists, and by increasing the number of special constables (mainly men in reserved occupations). These were supplemented by War Reserve Police who were men over the age of conscription but who were not doing work that was considered essential for the war effort.

== Police Auxiliary Messenger Service ==
=== Establishment of the service ===
The Home Office had foreseen that communications would become difficult in the event of an air raid when it was likely that telephone communications would be cut either by wires coming down, by a power failure or where a telephone link could not be established. Civil Defence committees set up their own messenger services in 1939, in some cases pressing entire troops of Boy Scouts into service. This enthusiasm had to be tempered at the prospect of boys, and in some cases girls, of 14 out riding bikes with bombs flying around. A UK wide scheme was then set up in 1941 for volunteers over 18 – those under 18 were used post raid only. The Police however needed their own messengers and from 1940 they took on lads below the age of 18, with their own bikes, (some forces recruited at the age of 15, others at 16). The PAMs, as they were universally called, were to act as messengers during and after raids. They were issued with uniforms – army surplus dyed black - and wore berets, or tin helmets during raids. They were employed full-time although it is thought that some Police Authorities also took on volunteer PAMs who only worked when the sirens went off.

=== Training ===
PAMs were given a basic training in first aid and in the use of stirrup pumps. They had to know where all the civil defence and Police out-stations were – they would often be riding their bikes at night in the black out and would not always be able to see such street signs as there were; during or after an air raid streets could be blocked with rubble and debris.

=== PAMs at work ===
From the firsthand account of those who served as PAMs it seems that in some areas where there was little enemy bombing, e.g. Oxfordshire, that PAMS were used as extra pairs of hands to make up for lack of manpower particularly in the headquarters offices. In areas targeted by the enemy the PAMs filled their primary role of taking messages during air raids but would also help the rescue services when needed. This was clearly the case in Coventry where PAMs proved their worth during the heavy bombing raids. George Frederick Barratt of the Coventry PAMs was awarded a British Empire Medal in June 1941 – his citation reads “Police Messenger Barratt, who was in the lower corridor of a building when it received a direct hit from a H.E. bomb, was blown by the blast for some distance. When he recovered he immediately made his way to report to the Main A.R.P. Control Centre and was sent out with a message. On the way he was blown off his cycle by blast. He remounted and continued his journey but ran into some broken telephone wires and sustained injuries to his neck. He delivered the message and returned with the reply. First aid treatment was obtained for him and although he was badly shaken again he went out through the rain of falling bombs to deliver other vital messages.” Another Coventry PAMs' citation for the B.E.M. reads: "Howard George Miles, Police Messenger, Police auxiliary Messenger Service, Coventry. During a severe enemy air attack Police Messenger Miles rendered great assistance by delivering urgent and important messages. He dealt with many incendiary bombs and, at grave risk to himself, helped to rescue a baby who was trapped in the wreckage of a house. Miles showed courage and devotion to duty.”

== Discontinuation of the service ==
During War time, Police officers and their auxiliary support were not allowed to resign. In June 1945, in response to a question in the House Sir D Somervell, Secretary of State for the Home Department announced the discontinuation of this restriction on PAMs: "Yes, Sir. I am glad to say that the war-time restrictions on the liberty to resign of part-time special constables and part-time members of the Women's Auxiliary Police Corps and the police auxiliary messenger service will come to an end on the 1st July." This effectively resulted in the disbandment of the Police Auxiliary Messenger Service and its replacement with Police Cadets.

== PAMs in literature ==
The Police Auxiliary Messenger Service is little known in literature but a recent book, Blitz PAMs, by John Orton, gives a semi-fictional account of the early years of the blitz on South Shields through the eyes of a 16 year old PAM. Although the story line (as told by Mossie Hamed, a grocery delivery boy of mixed Yemeni/Shields blood, which includes his ill-fated love for Jackie Hansen, a girl who pretends to be a lad to become a PAM) is fictional, the accounts of the air raids on South Shields are as near fact as possible, based on the photographic archive held by South Tyneside Local Library Service.

== PAMs archive material ==
The Metropolitan Police Force's records of their Police Auxiliary Messenger Service is now deposited at The National Archives. Kew.
