= Could You Please Oblige Us with a Bren Gun? =

1941 song written by Noël Coward

"Could You Please Oblige Us with a Bren Gun?" is a humorous song written and composed by Noël Coward in 1941.

Like much of Coward's work it displays skill at wordplay and evokes a feeling of both good humour and patriotic pride. The song pokes fun at the disorder and shortages of equipment, supplies and effective leadership that the Home Guard experienced during the Second World War.

== Content ==
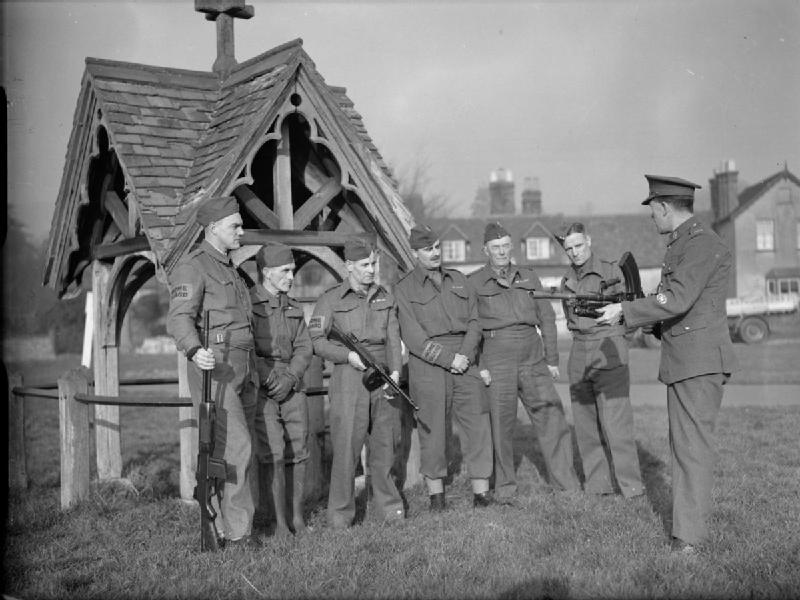
Home Guard soldiers being trained in the use of a Bren light machine gun, 1940

The song centres on an elderly ex-soldier, Colonel Montmorency, who was "in Calcutta in 'ninety-two". He has come out of retirement to raise a corps of the Home Guard, and the lyrics tell of two letters that he addresses to the "Minister of Supply", courteously but desperately appealing for munitions:

Could you please oblige us with a Bren gun?
Or failing that, a hand grenade will do.

He repeatedly emphasises the paucity and makeshift nature of the equipment the unit currently possesses:

We've got some ammunition, in a rather damp condition,
And Major Huss has a arquebus that was used at Waterloo.
With the Vicar's stirrup pump, a pitchfork and a stave,
It's rather hard to guard an aerodrome.

In his second letter, Montmorency reports that:

Last night we found the cutest, little German parachutist:
He looked at our kit, and giggled a bit, and laughed until he cried.

And he also remarks:

We'll have to hide that armoured car when marching to Berlin:
We'd almost be ashamed of it in Rome.

Several verses conclude:

So if you can't oblige us with a Bren gun,
The Home Guard might as well go home.

The subject of the song, the Bren light machine gun, was in high demand and short supply in wartime Britain, especially in 1941, when the British military was still recovering from the massive loss of materiel and supplies at Dunkirk. First priority was given to the British Army and Royal Marines, with the result that the units of the Home Guard, the very last line of defence, were quite unlikely to get one. As a result, members of the Home Guard often had to make do with whatever they could get their hands on – frequently old and outdated weapons.

Montmorency, the surname of the colonel, is also the name of the dog in Jerome K. Jerome's humorous novel Three Men in a Boat (1889).

== Legacy ==
"Could You Please Oblige Us with a Bren Gun?" is available on several compilation albums and box sets of Coward's songs.

Graham Payn, Coward's longtime companion and literary executor, related that the post-war generation found an appreciation for the song after watching the British television series Dad's Army, which similarly found humour in the exploits of the Home Guard. The song was later featured in the West End stage show of the television programme. It was also performed by some of the Dad's Army cast in a BBC Noël Coward special: the performance appears as a special feature on the DVD Dad's Army: The Christmas Specials.
