= Dingbat the Singing Cat =

Single by Freddy Martin and His Orchestra
- B-side: "Happy Journey"
- Released: 1946
- Recorded: 1946
- Genre: Pop
- Length: 3:06
- Label: RCA Victor
- Songwriters: Al Hoffman, Ted Mossman

"Dingbat the Singing Cat" is a 1940s pop song by Freddy Martin and His Orchestra, adapted from Prokofiev's "Peter and the Wolf".

== History ==
Adapted and arranged from the Russian Composer Sergei Prokofiev's symphonic fairy tale "Peter and the Wolf" with music and lyrics by Al Hoffman and Ted Mossman, it was recorded in 1946 by Freddy Martin and His Orchestra. Performed in the swing style, it features on vocals Stuart Wade, Glenn Hughes and the Martin Men.

== Release details ==
Released by RCA Victor in June 1946 as a 78 rpm 10-inch shellac recording, it was the 'A' side of catalog number 20-1908 ('B' side was Happy Journey).

== Other recordings ==
In 2007, it was remixed by independent artist Dalt Wisney and released on the EP Lifetime Psychedelic Dance Lessons.
