= Miguel Bernal Jiménez =

Mexican composer (1910–1956)

Statue of Miguel Bernal Jiménez at the Conservatorio de las Rosas, Morelia, Michoacán, Mexico

Miguel Bernal Jiménez (16 February 1910 – 26 July 1956) was a Mexican composer, organist, teacher, and musicologist.

He is widely regarded as the best representative of 20th century Mexican religious music, in addition to his important contributions to the Mexican nationalist music movement. He is considered by some to be the mainstay of the nacionalismo sacro (sacred nationalism) movement.

== Biography ==
He was born in the city of Morelia, Michoacán. He began his musical career at the age of seven as a choirboy in the Orfeón Pío X, studying in the Colegio de Infantes de la Catedral. His talent was discovered by his teachers Felipe Aguilera Ruiz and Ignacio Mier y Arriaga, who succeeded in getting him recommended and admitted in 1928 to the Instituto Pontificio de Música Sagrada (Pontifical Institute of Sacred Music) of Rome by the Canónigo José María Villaseñor. In this institution he was instructed in organ, counterpoint, fugue, paleographic musicology, composition, orchestration, harmony and Gregorian chant, by his teachers Cesare Dobici, Raffaele Manari, Raffaele Casimiri, Paolo M. Ferretti, and Licinio Refice. He graduated two years later with the titles of Doctor in Gregorian chant, Master in composition, and organ concert performer.

In 1933, he returned to Mexico to be director of the Escuela Superior de Música Sagrada (Sacred Music High School) of Morelia, a position he held for twenty years. In Morelia he fought relentlessly to create schools, give concerts, courses and congresses. He published many books, sheet music, and specialized magazines, giving foremost importance to sacred music. In 1939, he founded the Schola Cantorum magazine, the first periodical to publish musicological, musical, and pedagogic material. It was one of the most important means of musical diffusion in his time.

In his time, Miguel Bernal made himself an important spot in multiple social circles in Mexico, and made friends with other great musicians of his time, including Manuel M. Ponce and Silvestre Revueltas. He was recognized internationally and many of his works were premiered in Spain.

He created the Amigos de la Música (Music Friends) society in 1938. In 1944 he organized and directed the Coro de los Niños Cantores de Morelia (Morelia Singing Boys Choir). In 1945 he became director of the Conservatorio de las Rosas, where he worked to bring the institution up to date and gave its current image. Between 1945 and 1946 he toured the United States and Canada giving organ concerts. He was dean of the College of Music of the Loyola University New Orleans until his death in 1956 due to a heart attack.

Miguel Bernal also regularly published in his periodical publication, Schola Cantorum.

== Works ==
His most important works include:

- Ave Gratia Plena (1924)
- Cuarteto Virreinal (1937)
- Suite Sinfónica Michoacán (1940)
- Por el Valle de las Rosas (1941)
- Opera: Tata Vasco (1941)
- Noche en Morelia (1941)
- Misa Aeternae Trinitatis (1941)
- La Virgen que Forjó una Patria (1942)
- Tingambato (1943)
- Angelus (1943)
- Misa Guadalupana Juandieguito (1945)
- Sinfonía-Poema: México (1946)
- Retablo Medieval: Concertino para Órgano y Orquesta (1949)
- Tres Cartas de México (1949)
- El Chueco (1951)
- Carteles (1952)
- Los Tres Galanes de Juana (1952)
- Sinfonía Hidalgo (1953)
- Antífonas para México (1954)
- El Himno de los Bosques (1956)

His large musical repertoire includes diverse works. One of the most noteworthy is Tata Vasco (1941), symphonic drama which speaks of Vasco de Quiroga, called Tata Vasco by the native Purépecha people. It premiered in Pátzcuaro, Mexico in 1941 and was later performed in Madrid in 1948 with costumes and scenery by Alejandro Rangel Hidalgo. This work combines indigenous peoples' chants, gregorian chants and romantic melodies to represent each part of the story.

Bernal composed many of his works at the request of other parties. "Noche de Morelia" (1941) was made by request of the local Red Cross, and premiered by the Matinal Symphony Orchestra under the direction of its header and founder Carlos Chávez. This work is representative of many of the customs of the people of Morelia at the time. His Symphony-Poem "Mexico" (1946), one of his most representative nationalist works, gave him the acknowledgment of the Spanish composer Joaquin Turina.

In his "Concertino para Órgano y Orquesta" (1949) he manifests his own admiration for great composers of the European Baroque and Classical periods, the influence of which is not as noticeable in his other, earlier works. Bernal Jiménez demonstrates his harmonious dexterity by arranging the identity of the organ as a solo instrument and accompanies it grandiloquently with an orchestra. The medieval altarpiece that designs this work is characterized in its two first parts; "Mester de Juglares" and "Mester de Clerecia".

"El Chueco" (1951) is considered as one of the most representative works of Mexican ballet of the 20th century. The work shows a nationalist sonority characterized by popular themes, in a background that seems inherently religious. The work was released in 1951 by the National Symphony Orchestra in the Palacio de Bellas Artes and was directed by Bernal Jiménez himself.

His "Sinfonia Hidalgo" (1953) was requested by the "Universidad Michoacana de San Nicolás de Hidalgo" and was released by the National Symphony Orchestra by its author in the "Teatro Ocampo" of Morelia.

=== Style and influences ===
Because of his birth at the start of the Mexican Revolution, the works of Miguel Bernal Jiménez are found to be defined by a marked nationalism. His religious education and devotion to Catholicism, combined with his nationalism, made him become the head of the movement known as "Nacionalismo sacro", the product of the "motu proprio", published by the Pope Pius X in 1903. This document promoted the reintroduction of sacred music by medium of blending it with regional elements. This, along with the religious tolerance which was the product of the arrangements between the church and the Mexican state after the Cristero War, defined the style of one of the musicians with most influence in contemporary Mexican music.

Miguel Bernal Jiménez defended the application of innovative tendencies in religious music to vindicate its supremacy as a holy art over the profane. His style of music is eclectic, music that intends to encompass all the elements of Mexico and to expose all the elements of its reality.

Miguel Bernal Jiménez also shows common elements of Manuel M. Ponce and other nationalist composers of this era. He also seems to mix his music with themes obtained from popular traditions, like work chants, religious mottoes and melodies of political context.

Harmonically, however, his music is of a markedly conservative strain. It bears the influences of the pan-modal style offered up by the Catholic Church style of the twentieth century Schola Cantorum, along with elements of Debussy and other composers thrown in to good effect. "Tres Cartas de Mexico", for example, practically quotes Debussy's Nocturnes for orchestra.

== Musicological work ==
As a musicologist, he investigated the history of colonial music. After arduous and tedious searches, he discovered the first archive of Mexican colonial music, which dates from the 18th century, and comes from the "School of Santa Rosa de Virreinato".

== Pedagogical work ==
Miguel Bernal Jiménez also worked as a great pedagogist. His methods and publications were tested with success in the "Conservatorio de las Rosas" and the "Escuela Popular de Bellas Artes". In 1939 he founded the magazine "Schola Cantorum" which was, for a long time, one of the most important media of musical diffusion of the country. The magazine kept being published periodically until the year 1974, and until that year, it conserved the original format proposed by its creator. In this magazine, Bernal Jiménez constantly published musical, musicological and pedagogical material under pseudonyms such as "M.Mouse", "Q.U.D", "Primicerius", "Jaime Le Brungel" and "Fray Florindo".

Miguel Bernal was a prolific academic and his bibliographic archive consists of 11 books and 173 articles, many of which were used in the teachings of sacred music in varied locations throughout the country, and in seminaries in Mexico and abroad. In what are commonly regarded as his most important works, he elaborated on methods of music theory in Gregorian Chant. Included in this category are "La Disciplina Coral", "Las tres etapas de la ejecucion gregoriana", "teoria del canto gregoriano", "El acompañamiento gregoriano" and "La dirección gregoriana".

== Achievements ==
During his life he received the "Premio Pontificio" in three occasions (1930, 1931 and 1932), the "Diploma de Honor de la Federación Teatral Mexicana" (1941), the "Medalla al Mérito Civil", given by the newspaper El Universal (1941), the "Premio Nacional" (1943) for the music used in the movie "La Virgen que forjó una Patria", The "Condecoracion Generalisimo Morelos" (1945) and the "Primer Premio del Concurso Chopin" (1949). In 1956, he was declared "favorite child" of the state of Michoacán.
