= The Hut-Sut Song =

"The Hut Sut Song"

Song by Horace Heidt and His Musical Knights
- Language: English, Gibberish
- Released: 1941
- Genre: Novelty
- Length: 2:43
- Songwriters: Leo V. Killion, Ted McMichael, Jack Owens

"The Hut-Sut Song (a Swedish Serenade)" is a novelty song from the 1940s with nonsense lyrics. The song was written in 1941 by Leo V. Killion, Ted McMichael and Jack Owens. The first and most popular recording was by Horace Heidt and His Musical Knights. A 1941 Time magazine entry suggests the song was probably a creative adaptation of an unpublished Missouri River song called "Hot Shot Dawson".

== Lyrics ==
The lyrics of the chorus are supposed to be a garbled rendition of a Swedish folk song. The chorus goes in part:

"Hut-Sut Rawlson on the rillerah and a brawla, brawla sooit."

The song then purports to define some of the words, supposedly Swedish: "Rawlson" being a Swedish town, "rillerah" being a stream, "brawla" being the boy and girl, "hut-sut" being their dream and "sooit" being the schoolteacher. The story told in the song is that of a boy (and later a girl) who play hooky from school and spend their days fishing and dreaming by the riverbank, until their schoolteacher finds them and, to prevent the incident from happening again, "plant(s) poison oak all along the stream." The children end up back at school. To explain why the words bear no resemblance to actual Swedish language, the song notes that the boy didn't know any Swedish and that the nonsense words were simply ones the boy made up to go along with the melody he heard.

The song was also recorded by various artists such as Mel Tormé, Freddy Martin, The Four King Sisters, and Spike Jones. The song is of the same genre as other novelty songs of the era, such as "Mairzy Doats" and "Three Little Fishies (Itty Bitty Pool)" – all three of which were subjected to the musical arrangements of Spike Jones.

== In popular culture ==
The popularity of the song is lampooned in a 1940s film short. In the film, The King's Men (who also performed on Fibber McGee and Molly) play young men living in a boarding house who are endlessly singing the song while getting dressed, eating dinner, playing cards, etc., until an exasperated fellow boarder (William Irving) finally has them removed to an insane asylum.

In 1942, Horton the Elephant (voiced by Kent Rogers) sang the song in a Warner Bros. Merrie Melodies animated adaptation of the Dr. Seuss book Horton Hatches the Egg, though he struggled to remember the correct lyrics. He later sang a reprise with the baby Elephant-Bird (voiced by Sara Berner).

Virginia O'Brien sings just a few words of the song as a cigarette girl exiting a scene in the 1942 musical film Panama Hattie. In the 1951 film Ace in the Hole the song is referred to as what soldiers on a landing craft sang together to calm their nerves during an amphibious operation in Italy. The song is also featured in the films From Here to Eternity and A Christmas Story.

A snippet of the song was also sung by Rowlf the Dog in a "Veterinarians' Hospital" sketch on The Muppet Show. In the UK, an episode of a 1970s sitcom Happy Ever After (a show that evolved into the later sitcom Terry and June), starring Terry Scott and June Whitfield, was built around the song. In the episode "The Hut-Sut-Song" (series 5, episode 2, first aired in September 1978) Terry remembers the Melba Trio version of the song from his youth. He discovers that his 78 rpm copy is badly scratched, and finding a replacement becomes a comic quest throughout the episode.
