= Why Don't We Do This More Often? =

Song by Freddy Martin And His Orchestra
- Released: 1941
- Genre: Traditional Pop
- Songwriters: Allie Wrubel, Charles Newman

"Why Don't We Do This More Often?" is a song with music written by Allie Wrubel and lyrics by Charles Newman, published in 1941. The song is considered a standard, having been recorded by many artists including, Bing Crosby.

== Selected recordings ==
- Kay Kyser (1941)
- The Andrews Sisters (1941)
- Benny Goodman (1949)
- Doris Day - Cuttin' Capers (1959)

== Popular culture ==
- In the Warner Brothers cartoon "Bugs Bunny Gets the Boid", Bugs Bunny and Beaky Buzzard say the first two lines of the song.
