= Tata Vasco (opera) =

Miguel Bernal Jiménez, the composer of Tata Vasco (statue in the Conservatorio de las Rosas, Morelia, Michoacán)

Tata Vasco is an opera in five scenes composed by Miguel Bernal Jiménez to a Spanish libretto with nationalistic and devoutly Roman Catholic themes by the Mexican priest and poet, Manuel Muñoz. It premiered in Pátzcuaro, Mexico on 15 February 1941. The opera is based on the life of Vasco de Quiroga, the first Bishop of Michoacán and known to the indigenous Purépecha of the region as 'Tata Vasco'. Considered one of Bernal Jiménez's most emblematic scores, the music incorporates native melodies, dances, and instruments as well as elements of Gregorian chant.

== Background and performance history ==
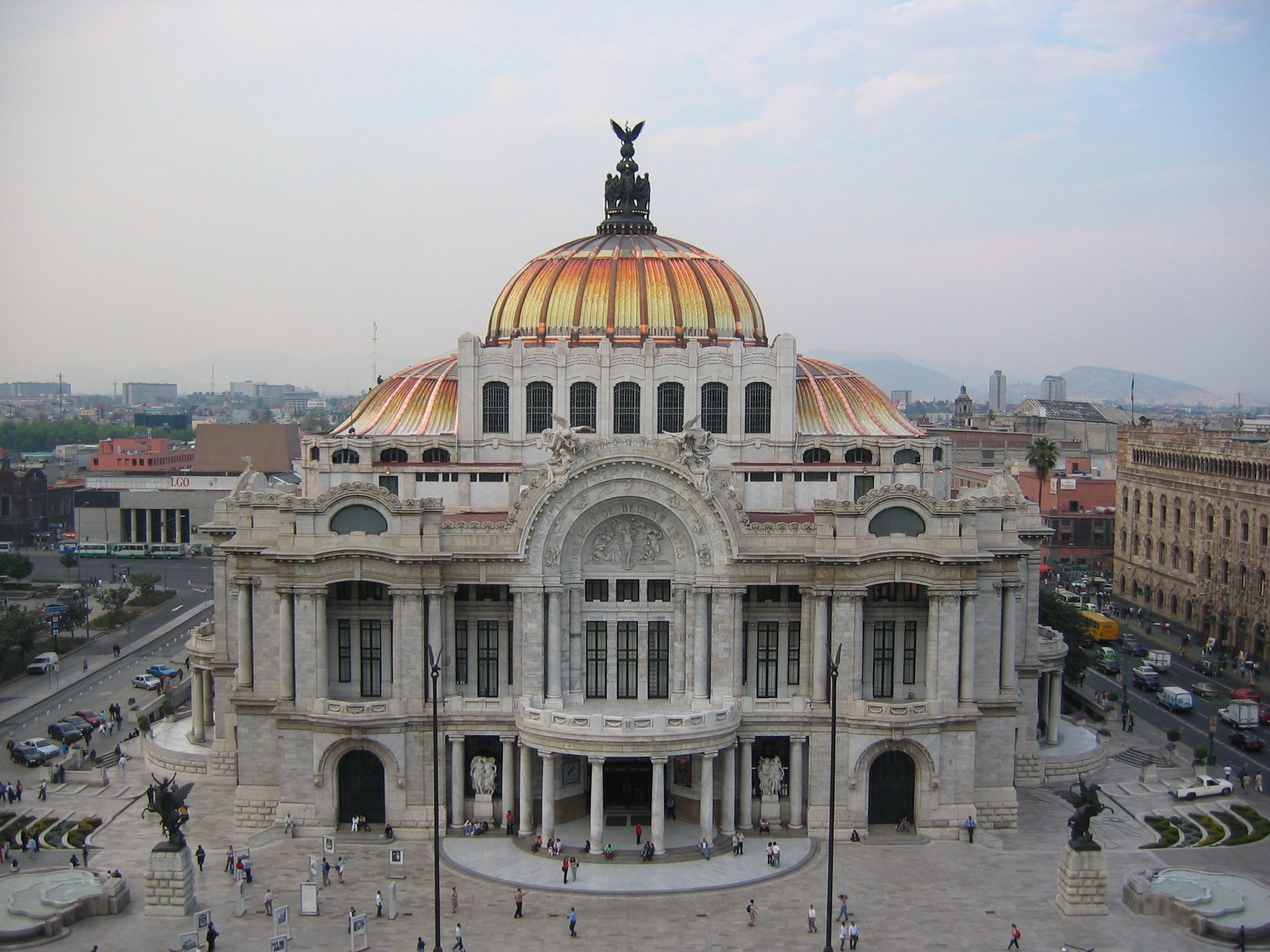
Mexico City's Palacio de Bellas Artes

Described as a drama sinfónico (symphonic drama), Tata Vasco was the first and only opera by Bernal Jiménez and composed when he was 30 years old. It was to be part of the celebrations for the 400th anniversary of Vasco de Quiroga's arrival in Pátzcuaro and was set to a libretto in rhyming verse by Manuel Muñoz Mendoza, a Catholic priest, poet, and writer who lived in Morelia, the composer's native city. The world premiere was originally planned for 1940 at the Palacio de Bellas Artes in Mexico City but was postponed due to fears that it would "provoke religious controversy". Instead, it premiered on 15 February 1941 in a performance conducted by the composer in the ruins of the Franciscan monastery chapel in Pátzcuaro.

The opera had its Mexico City premiere at the Teatro Arbeu on 15 March 1941 and in September of that year was performed to great enthusiasm in Morelia. It was performed in 1943 at the Teatro Degollado in Guadalajara and in 1948 had its Spanish premiere, when at the invitation of General Franco, a reduced oratorio version was performed in Madrid. Part of Spain's commemorations for the 400th anniversary of the death of Hernán Cortés, the Madrid performance met with considerable success. On 29 September 1949, eight years after its premiere, Tata Vasco was finally staged at the Palacio de Bellas Artes where it was given a run of two performances, both conducted by the composer. The opera was revived there in 1975, 1992 (in concert version), and in 2006 to mark the 50th anniversary of the composer's death.

Tata Vasco was given two performances by the National Opera Company of Mexico at the Teatro de la Ciudad de Mexico in February 2010, the year which marks not only the bicentenary of the Mexican War of Independence and the centenary of the Mexican Revolution but also the 100th anniversary of the composer's birth.

== Score ==
The opera is scored for: 2 flutes, 1 piccolo, 2 oboes, 1 cor anglais, 2 clarinets, 1 bass clarinet, 2 bassoons, 4 French horns, 3 trumpets, 3 trombones, tuba, harp, piano, celesta, cymbals, drum, timbales, bombo (type of bass drum), pandero (type of frame drum), gong, glockenspiel, bells, maracas, vibraphone, teponaztli, and strings.

== Roles and premiere cast ==
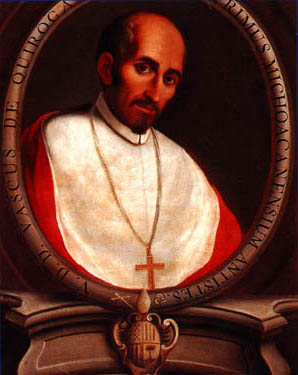
Vasco de Quiroga

- Vasco de Quiroga ("Tata Vasco", Bishop of Michoacán), baritone – Gilberto Cerda
- Coyuva (daughter of the Purépecha king, Tangaxuan II), soprano – Leonor Caden
- Ticátame (a Purépecha prince), tenor – Ricardo C. Lara
- Petámuti (a Purépecha sorcerer), bass – Felipe Aguilera
- Cuninjángari (the Purépecha governor of Tzintzuntzan), baritone – Ernesto Farfán
- Three friars, tenor, baritone, and bass – Nicolás Rico, Miguel Botello and Saturnino Huerta
- Watchman, baritone
- First singer, tenor
- Second singer, mezzo-soprano
- A child, boy soprano

The cast also includes a mixed chorus, children, and dancers

== Synopsis ==
Setting: Michoacán, circa 1537

Scene 1. At night in a forest where the Purépecha kings are buried, the warriors, led by the sorcerer Petámuti, are dancing around a bonfire. They have sworn revenge for the death of their king who was burnt at the stake by the Spanish conquistador, Nuño de Guzmán. Princess Coyuva, the king's daughter, arrives bearing his ashes. Her betrothed, Prince Ticátame, expresses his hatred for the Spanish and determination to avenge her father's death. Coyuva, who has become a Christian, tells him to forgive his enemies and to follow the teachings of 'Tata Vasco', Don Vasco de Quiroga, a priest and the Spanish judge (Oidor) for the territory. When Ticátame is persuaded by Coyuva's words, Petámuti tries to kill him and in the ensuing struggle with the prince is killed. In a fury, Petámuti curses the young lovers.

Scene 2. In the sacristy of the Franciscan church in Tzintzuntzan, native children play while waiting for their lesson. A jovial friar arrives and after the lesson tells the children a story and asks them to sing like minstrels. When their song is finished, the children depart and Tata Vasco enters to receive a delegation from the natives in Tzintzuntzan, led by Cuninjángari, the city's governor and a relative of the dead king. Don Vasco assures them of his desire to help them and urges them to give up nomadic life and polygamy and convert to Christianity. Ticátame and Coyuva then arrive for an audience and ask Vasco (who has been made Bishop of Michoacán) to marry them in a Christian ceremony.

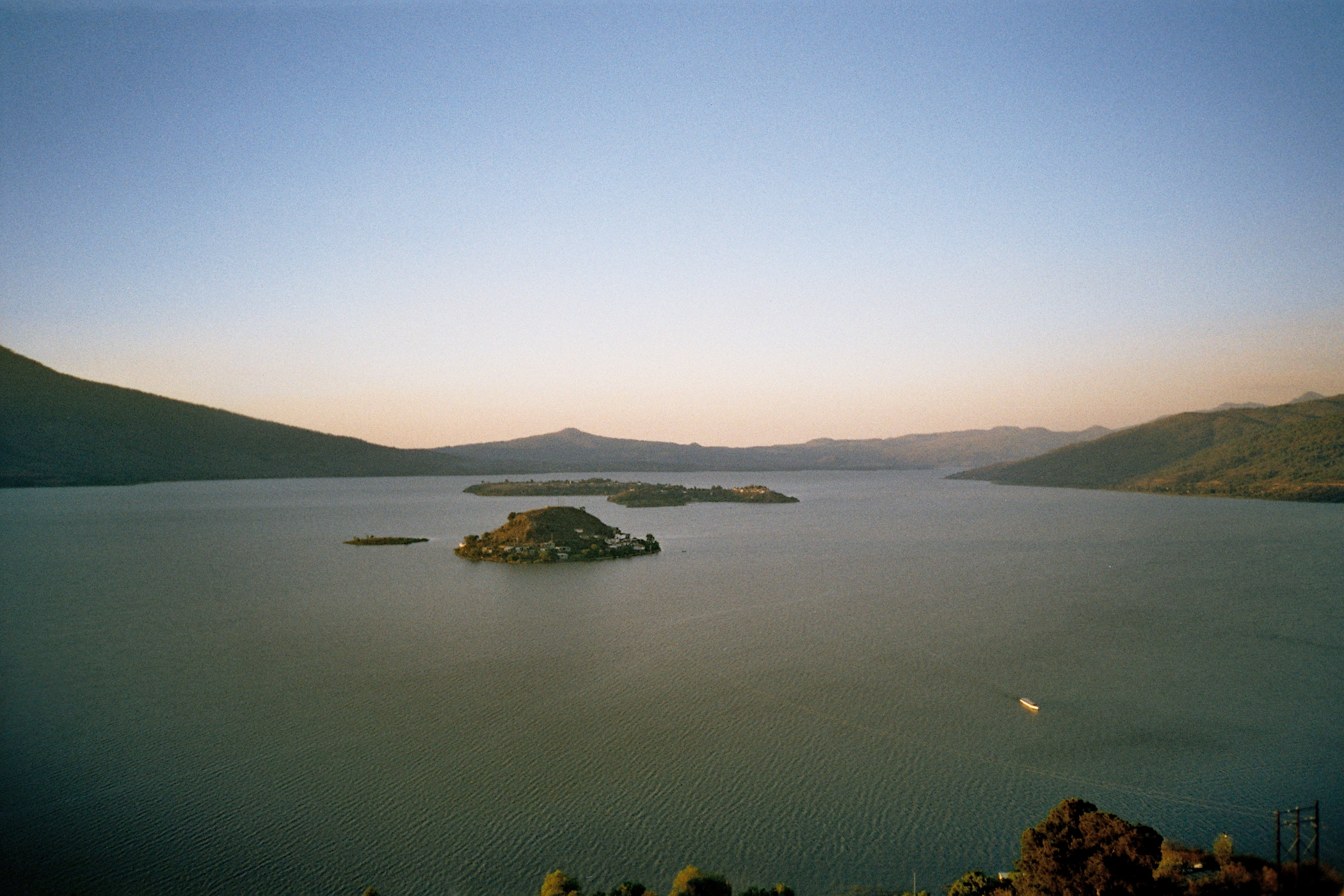
Lake Pátzcuaro

Scene 3. At dawn in the courtyard of the Franciscan church, the natives can be heard singing as they work in the fields. They then come to the courtyard bringing gifts. Vasco and his entourage arrive for the wedding of Ticátame and Coyuva. Before entering the church, he speaks to the couple about the sacrament of marriage and they promise to be faithful to each other. The doors of the church swing open and a choir is heard singing. As the wedding party are about to enter the church, the sorcer Petámuti arrives, dagger in hand, to murder Ticátame and Coyuva. Petámuti accidentally falls on the church steps and is mortally wounded by his own weapon. Hearing his cries, Cuninjángari calls to Don Vasco to minister to the dying man. After Vasco speaks to him, Petámuti asks to be baptised before he dies. A group of native folk then carry off his body while songs of praise (ablados) heard in the distance.

Scene 4. On a hill overlooking Lake Pátzcuaro, there is a fiesta to celebrate Ticátame and Coyuva's wedding. Don Vasco arrives and watches four dances performed by the natives and listens to a song and toast to the couple in their native language. Before leaving, he addresses the natives and invites them to come to Pátzcuaro where they can learn new trades to better their lives. Don Vasco departs and the scene closes with another dance in which all present take part.

Scene 5. In the audience room of the Bishop's palace in Pátzcuaro, Don Vasco is looking over plans for the new cathedral and seminary. A group of natives arrive to present the first fruits of the industries he has taught them. A colourful parade ensues in which gourd cups, pottery, fishing nets, guitars, blouses and shawls are displayed to Don Vasco. Deeply touched, he tells the natives that he will dedicate his life to their welfare and shows them an image of the Virgin of Good Health, who he says will protect them and their children.

== Sources ==
- Brennan, Juan Arturo, "Tata Vasco: ópera revisionista", La Jornada, 28 November 2008 (in Spanish, accessed 29 March 2010)
- Cortés, Raúl Arreola, La poesía en Michoacán: desde la época prehispánica hasta nuestros días, Fimax Publicistas, 1979 (in Spanish)
- Protocolo, "Con la ópera Tata Vasco, Bellas Artes inicia su temporada 2010", 12 February 2010 (in Spanish, accessed 29 March 2010)
- Saavedra, Leonora, "Staging the Nation: Race, Religion, and History in Mexican Opera of the 1940s", Opera Quarterly, Vol. 23, 2007, pp. 1–21
- Sosa, José Octavio, Tata Vasco, Diccionario de la Ópera Mexicana, Consejo Nacional para la Cultura y las Artes, 2005 (reprinted on operacalli.com with permission of the author) (in Spanish, accessed 29 March 2010)
- Standish, Peter, A Companion to Mexican Studies, Boydell & Brewer Ltd, 2006. ISBN 1-85566-134-9
- Stevenson, Robert, Music in Mexico: A historical survey, Crowell, 1952
- Stevenson, Robert (2001). "Bernal Jiménez, Miguel". In Sadie, Stanley; Tyrrell, John (eds.). The New Grove Dictionary of Music and Musicians (2nd ed.). London: Macmillan Publishers. ISBN 978-1-56159-239-5.
