= When I Love I Love =

Single by Carmen Miranda
- Released: 1941
- Genre: Samba
- Composer(s): Harry Warren
- Lyricist(s): Mack Gordon

Carmen Miranda singles chronology
"Diz Que Tem ..." (1941)	"When I Love I Love" (1941)	"Rebola, Bola" (1941)

"When I Love I Love" is a song written by Harry Warren and Mack Gordon and recorded by Carmen Miranda for the film Week-End in Havana in 1941.
