= Grand Coulee Dam (song) =

Song by Woody Guthrie
- Recorded: May 1941
- Songwriter(s): Woody Guthrie

"Grand Coulee Dam" is an American folk song recorded in 1941 by Woody Guthrie.

== Background ==
He wrote it during a brief period when he was commissioned by the Bonneville Power Administration to write songs as part of a documentary film project about the dam and related projects.

The song was part of the Columbia River Ballads, a set of 26 songs written by Guthrie as part of a commission by the BPA, the federal agency created to sell and distribute power from the river's federal hydroelectric facilities, in particular the Bonneville Dam and Grand Coulee Dam. On the recommendation of Alan Lomax, the BPA hired Guthrie to write a set of propaganda songs about the federal projects to gain support for federal regulation of hydroelectricity.

Although the intended documentary film was not completed until 1949, Guthrie's songs were recorded in Portland, Oregon in May 1941. The tune for "Grand Coulee Dam" is based on that of the traditional song "The Wabash Cannonball". Guthrie's recording was reissued on the Folkways album Bound For Glory in 1956, and subsequently on numerous compilations of Guthrie's songs.

The song was later recorded by British skiffle musician Lonnie Donegan, whose version entered the British pop charts in April 1958, rising to number six on the chart. Donegan was featured performing the song in the movie Six-Five Special, a spin-off of the British TV show of the same name. One critic has written:

[I]t remains arguable that, without recordings like [Donegan's] version of Woody's "Grand Coulee Dam", later performers (perhaps even Dylan himself) might not have beaten their way to Guthrie's door.
