= William H. Potstock =

German American musician and composer

William Herman Potstock (Wilhelm Hermann), (1872–1941) was a German American musician and composer. His best known work “Souvenir De Sarasate ” combines different techniques (left-hand pizzicato and double stops) and is a popular virtuoso piece.

== Life ==
Potstock was born in Northern Germany; he emigrated with his family via Bremen (Germany) to the U.S. in 1881. He lived and worked as a self-employed music teacher and musician in Chicago, where he died. In 1895 he married Martha Bock. They had two children, Stella (born 1896) and Eugene (1901–1979). His daughter was also an accomplished musician just like her father.

== List of compositions ==
- Souvenir de Sarasate: Fantasia Espagnole für Violine und Klavier in D-Dur, Op. 15
