= Raffaele Manari =

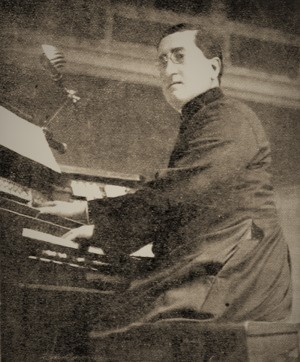
Raffaele Manari

Raffaele Manari (April 21, 1887, Carsoli – April 21, 1933, Rome) was an Italian priest, organist, and composer.

== Biography ==
He studied under the guidance of Raffaele Casimiri and, especially regarding the organ, with Remigio Renzi. He was one of the founders of the Pontifical Institute of Sacred Music in Rome, where he designed and inaugurated the grand Mascioni opus 438 organ. Among his students, notable ones include Ferruccio Vignanelli and Fernando Germani. From 1920 until his death, he served as the organist at the Basilica of St. John Lateran. He was one of the main proponents of the so-called Cecilian Movement.

== Works ==
- Fantasia siciliana
- Concert Etude on the "Salve Regina"
- Leggenda e Scherzo
