= Columbia River Collection =

Studio album by Woody Guthrie
- Released: 1987
- Recorded: 1941
- Genre: Folk
- Label: Rounder
- Producer: Moe Asch

Professional ratings
Review scores
Source	Rating
Allmusic	4/5 stars
New Musical Express	6/10

Columbia River Collection, also known as Woody Guthrie: The Columbia River Collection, is a compilation album of songs folksinger Woody Guthrie wrote during his visit to the U.S. states of Oregon and Washington in 1941. Guthrie traveled to these states on the promise of a part narrating a documentary about the construction of public works dams and other projects in the Pacific Northwest. The documentary was delayed by WWII but eventually was released in 1949. 17 of the 26 songs he wrote during this period were later compiled and released in 1987 as this collection, including some of his most famous songs, such as "Roll on Columbia", "Grand Coulee Dam", "Hard Travelin’," and "Pastures of Plenty."

"I pulled my shoes on and walked out of every one of these Pacific Northwest Mountain towns drawing pictures in my mind and listening to poems and songs and words faster to come and dance in my ears than I could ever get them wrote down."

— Guthrie's introduction in the Columbia River Songbook

== Production ==
Video: In 1941 Guthrie wrote songs for The Columbia: America's Greatest Power Stream, a documentary about the use of the Columbia River for hydroelectric power.

In May 1941, after a brief stay in Los Angeles, Guthrie moved to Portland, Oregon, in the neighborhood of Lents, on the promise of a job. Gunther von Fritsch was directing a documentary about the Bonneville Power Administration's construction of the Grand Coulee Dam on the Columbia River, and needed a narrator. Alan Lomax had recommended Guthrie to narrate the film and sing songs onscreen.

The original project was expected to take 12 months, but as the filmmakers became worried about casting such a political figure, they minimized Guthrie's role. The United States Department of the Interior hired him for one month to write songs about the Columbia River and the construction of the federal dams for the documentary's soundtrack.

Guthrie toured the Columbia River and the Pacific Northwest. Guthrie said he "couldn't believe it, it's a paradise", which appeared to inspire him creatively. In one month Guthrie wrote 26 songs, including three of his most famous: "Roll On, Columbia, Roll On", "Pastures of Plenty", and "Grand Coulee Dam". These were all included in the 1949 film Columbia: America's Greatest Power Stream.

== Track listing ==
1. "Oregon Trail"
2. "Roll on Columbia"
3. "New Found Land"
4. "Talking Columbia"
5. "Roll Columbia, Roll"
6. "Columbia’s Waters"
7. "Ramblin’ Blues"
8. "It Takes a Married Man to Sing a Worried Song"
9. "Hard Travelin’"
10. "The Biggest Thing That Man Has Ever Done"
11. "Jackhammer Blues"
12. "Song of the Coulee Dam"
13. "Grand Coulee Dam"
14. "Washington Talkin’ Blues"
15. "Ramblin’ Round"
16. "Pastures of Plenty"
17. "End of My Line"

== See also ==
- Woody Guthrie in the Pacific Northwest
- Bonneville Power Administration
- Woody Guthrie discography
