= Freddy Martin =

American bandleader and saxophonist (1906–1983)

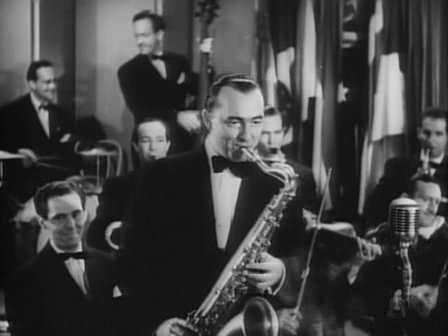
- Martin in the 1943 film Stage Door Canteen

Background information
- Born: Frederick Alfred Martin; December 9, 1906; Cleveland, Ohio, United States
- Died: September 30, 1983 (aged 76) Newport Beach, California, United States
- Genres: Big band, sweet jazz
- Occupations: Musician, bandleader
- Instrument: Saxophone

Frederick Alfred Martin (December 9, 1906 – September 30, 1983) was an American bandleader and tenor saxophonist.

== Early life ==
Freddy Martin was born in Cleveland, Ohio, United States. Raised largely in an orphanage and by various relatives, Martin started out playing drums, then switched to C melody saxophone and subsequently tenor saxophone, the latter the one with which he would be identified. Early on, he had intended to become a journalist. He had hoped that he would earn enough money from his musical work to enter Ohio State University, but instead, he wound up becoming an accomplished musician. Martin led his own band while he was in high school, then played in various local bands. Martin spent his spare time selling musical instruments, which also gave him an excuse to listen to the Lombardos play at the "Music Box". After working on a ship's band, Martin joined the Mason-Dixon band, then joined Arnold Johnson and Jack Albin. It was with Albin's "Hotel Pennsylvania Music" that he made his first recordings for Columbia's Harmony, Velvet Tone, and Clarion 50-cent labels in 1930.

== Early career ==
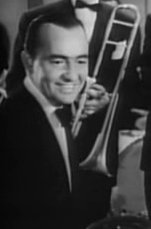
Martin in 1943

After a couple of years, his skill began attracting other musicians. One was Guy Lombardo, who remained friends with Martin throughout his life. After graduation from high school, Martin accepted a job at the H.N. White musical instrument company. When Lombardo was playing in Cleveland, Martin tried giving Lombardo some saxophones, which proved unsuccessful. However, Lombardo got to hear Martin's band. One night, when Lombardo could not do a certain date, he suggested that Martin's band could fill in for him. The band did very well and Martin's career got started. However, the band broke up, and he did not form a permanent band until 1931 at the Bossert Hotel in Brooklyn.

At the Bossert Marine Roof, a nautical-themed restaurant positioned on the roof of the hotel, Martin pioneered the "Tenor Band" style that swept the sweet-music industry. With his own tenor sax as melodic lead, Martin fronted an all-tenor sax section with just two brasses and a violin trio plus rhythm. The rich, lilting style quickly spawned imitators in hotels and ballrooms nationwide. "Tenor bands", usually with just the three tenors and one trumpet, could occasionally be found playing for older dancers well into the 1980s.

The Martin band recorded first for Columbia Records in 1932. As the company was broke and signing no new contracts, the band switched to Brunswick Records after one session and remained with that label till 1938. During his tenure at Brunswick/ARC, half of his recordings were issued on ARC's stable of budget-priced labels (Banner, Conqueror, Melotone, Oriole, Perfect, Romeo, and Vocalion) as well as scores of non-vocal takes issued on ARC's special theater use label, sold only to movie theaters as background music. In 1938, he signed with RCA Victor and was assigned to the Bluebird label. The band also recorded pseudonymously in the early 1930s, backing singers such as Will Osborne. From 1932 to 1938, the band's primary vocalists were saxophonist Elmer Feldkamp and pianist Terry Shand. The former primarily sang romantic ballads, while the latter was used mostly for 'hot' dance tunes.

Martin took his band into many prestigious hotels, including the Roosevelt Grill in New York City and the Ambassador Hotel in Los Angeles. A fixture on radio, his sponsored shows included NBC's Maybelline Penthouse Serenade of 1937. Martin's real success came in 1941 with an arrangement from the first movement of Tchaikovsky's Piano Concerto No. 1 in B♭ minor. Martin recorded the piece instrumentally, but soon lyrics were added by Ray Austin, and it was re-recorded as "Tonight We Love" with Clyde Rogers' vocal – becoming his biggest hit. It sold over one million copies by 1946 and was awarded a gold disc by the RIAA.

The success of "Tonight We Love" prompted Martin to adopt several other classical themes (of Rachmaninoff, Grieg, and others), which featured the band's pianists Jack Fina, Murray Arnold, and Barclay Allen. In 1946, he recorded "Dingbat the Singing Cat", adapted from Prokofiev's "Peter and the Wolf", and later recorded "A Lover's Concerto", adapted from baroque composer Christian Petzold's "Minuet in G major", two decades before pop group The Toys released it. At this time, Martin enlarged the orchestra to a strength of six violins, four brasses, and a like number of saxes.

His band's first hits included "Intermezzo" and "the Hut-Sut Song".

== Musical style ==
Martin was nicknamed "Mr. Silvertone" by saxophonist Johnny Hodges. Chu Berry named Martin his favorite saxophonist. He has also been idolized by many other saxophonists, including Eddie Miller. Although his playing has been admired by so many jazz musicians, Martin never tried to be a jazz musician. Martin always led a sweet-styled band. Unlike most sweet bands that just played dull music, Martin's band turned out to be one of the most musical and most melodic of all the typical hotel-room sweet bands. According to George T. Simon, Martin's band was "one of the most pleasant, most relaxed dance bands that ever flowed across the band scene."

He used the banner "Music in the Martin Manner." Russ Morgan used a similar banner when he finally landed a radio series with his own band in 1936. (Morgan's title was "Music in the Morgan Manner".) Morgan had been playing in Martin's band and the two were good friends for years. Morgan used some of Martin's arrangements when he started his band.

== Later career ==
Martin employed various people from the music industry for vocal performances, such as singers Merv Griffin, Buddy Clark, Gene Merlino; pianists Sid Appleman and Terry Shand; saxophonists Elmer Feldkamp and Stuart Wade; violinist Eddie Stone, and many others. Helen Ward was also a singer for Martin, just before she joined Benny Goodman's new band.

Martin's popularity as a bandleader led him to Hollywood in the 1940s where he and his band appeared in a handful of films, including Seven Days' Leave (1942), Stage Door Canteen (1943), and Melody Time (1948), among others.

In the 1950s and 1960s, Martin continued to perform on the radio and also appeared on TV. By 1955, he was featured five times a week on national radio networks through the RCA Thesaurus transcription service. Untroubled by changing musical tastes, he continued to work at major venues and was musical director for Elvis Presley's first appearance in Las Vegas. Still in demand for hotel work, Martin entered the 1970s with an engagement at the Ambassador Hotel in Los Angeles. In the early 1970s, he was part of two tours of one-nighters that were known as 'The Big Band Cavalcade'. Among the other performers on the show were Margaret Whiting, Bob Crosby, Frankie Carle, Buddy Morrow, Art Mooney, and George Shearing. When the tours ended, Martin returned to the West Coast. In 1977, Martin was asked to lead Guy Lombardo's band when Lombardo was hospitalized with a heart condition.

Martin continued leading his band until the early 1980s, although by then, he was semi-retired. Freddy Martin died on September 30, 1983, in Hoag Memorial Hospital Presbyterian, after suffering a second stroke. He was 76 years old.

The 1947 song "Pico and Sepulveda" was recorded by Martin under the alias of "Felix Figueroa and his Orchestra" and was frequently featured on Dr. Demento's syndicated radio show. It was also featured in the 1980 surrealist film Forbidden Zone.

== Selected discography ==
April in Paris (Brunswick 6717) 1933

I Saw Stars (Brunswick 6948) 1934
Be Still, My Heart (Brunswick 6998) 1934
Everything's Been Done Before (Brunswick 7395) 1935
Tell Me That You Love Me (Brunswick 7438) 1935
I Couldn't Believe My Eyes (Brunswick 7462) 1935
Paris in the Spring (Brunswick 7459) 1935
A Little Bit Independent (Brunswick 7559) 1935
The Broken Record (Brunswick 7591) 1936
Goody Goody (Brunswick 7621) 1936
It's Been So Long (Brunswick 7631) 1936
Scatter-Brain (Bluebird 10436) 1939
Intermezzo (Bluebird 11113) 1941
The Hut-Sut Song (Bluebird 11147) 1941
Piano Concerto in B-Flat (Bluebird 11430) 1941
Tonight We Love (Bluebird 11320) 1941
Rose O'Day (Bluebird 11286) 1941
Grieg Piano Concerto (Bluebird 11430) 1942
I Met Her on Monday (Victor 27909) 1942
Dream (Victor 1645) 1945
Laura (Victor 1655) 1945
Lily Belle (Victor 1712) 1945
Symphony (Victor 1747) 1945
Doin' What Comes Natur'lly (RCA Victor 1878) 1946
To Each His Own (RCA Victor 1921) 1946
Managua, Nicaragua (RCA Victor 2026) 1947
The Lady from 29 Palms (RCA Victor 2347) 1947
Sabre Dance Boogie (RCA Victor 2721) 1948
The Dickey-Bird Song (RCA Victor 2617) 1948
On a Slow Boat to China (RCA Victor 3123) 1948

I've Got a Lovely Bunch of Coconuts (RCA Vic.78-3554) 1949
Music! Music! Music! (RCA Vic. 78-3693) 1950
