= Allie Wrubel =

American songwriter (1905–1973)

- Born: Elias Paul Wrubel; January 15, 1905; Middletown, Connecticut, U.S.
- Died: December 13, 1973 (aged 68) Twentynine Palms, California, U.S.
- Occupations: Composer, songwriter

Elias Paul "Allie" Wrubel (January 15, 1905 – December 13, 1973) was an American composer and songwriter.

== Biography ==
Wrubel was born to a Jewish family in Middletown, Connecticut, United States, the son of Regina (née Glasscheib) and Isaac Wrubel. His family founded the Wrubels department store in Middletown, Connecticut. He attended Wesleyan University and Columbia University before working in dance bands. "After earning his bachelor’s degree in 1926, Allie enrolled in graduate music studies at Columbia University. He roomed with his close friend, film actor James Cagney [a former Columbia undergrad], and began playing with bands in Greenwich Village and making the rounds on Tin Pan Alley." He played saxophone and clarinet for a variety of famous swing bands. In 1934 he moved to Hollywood to work for Warner Bros. as a contract songwriter. He contributed material to a large number of movies, including those of the famous Busby Berkeley before moving to Disney in 1947.

Wrubel collaborated with lyricist Ray Gilbert on the song "Zip-a-Dee-Doo-Dah", from the film Song of the South, which won the Oscar for Best Song in 1947.

Wrubel also contributed to the films Make Mine Music, Duel in the Sun, I Walk Alone, Melody Time, Tulsa, Never Steal Anything Small and Midnight Lace. The lyricists with whom he collaborated included Abner Silver, Herb Magidson, Charles Newman, Mort Dixon and Ned Washington. When he died, from a heart attack aged 68, in Twentynine Palms, California, he left a lengthy catalogue of songs.

Allie Wrubel was inducted into the Songwriters Hall of Fame in 1970. His best-known songs include:

- "Breakin' My Back Putting Up A Front For You"
- "Cleanin' My Rifle (Dreamin' Of You)"
- "Gone with the Wind"
- "Farewell to Arms"
- "Flirtation Walk"
- "I Met Her on Monday"
- "I'll Buy That Dream"
- "Mine Alone"
- "Music Maestro Please"
- "The Lady from 29 Palms"
- "The Lady in Red"
- "The Masquerade Is Over"
- "Why Don't We Do This More Often?"
- "Zip-a-Dee-Doo-Dah"
