= Victor Trevitt =

American politician

Victor Trevitt ("Vic", c. 1827-1883) was a soldier, publisher, business owner, and legislator in the U.S. state of Oregon. He was born in New Hampshire in about 1827 and lived in Ohio prior to enlisting for the Mexican War, in which he lost an eye. He was a publisher of the Salem Statesman and the Vox Populii, and later served as a member of the Oregon House of Representatives and the Oregon State Senate. He was a Mason.

He owned and operated a toll bridge over the Deschutes River, but sold it upon the successful launch of the Colonel Wright steamship. He also operated a saloon in The Dalles. He died in 1883 after moving to San Francisco, and his dying wish was to be buried among the native people of Oregon, who he avowed to be more honorable than white people. His is the only grave marker on Memaloose Island in the Columbia River near Mosier, Oregon.
