= Roll On, Columbia, Roll On =

"Roll On Columbia"
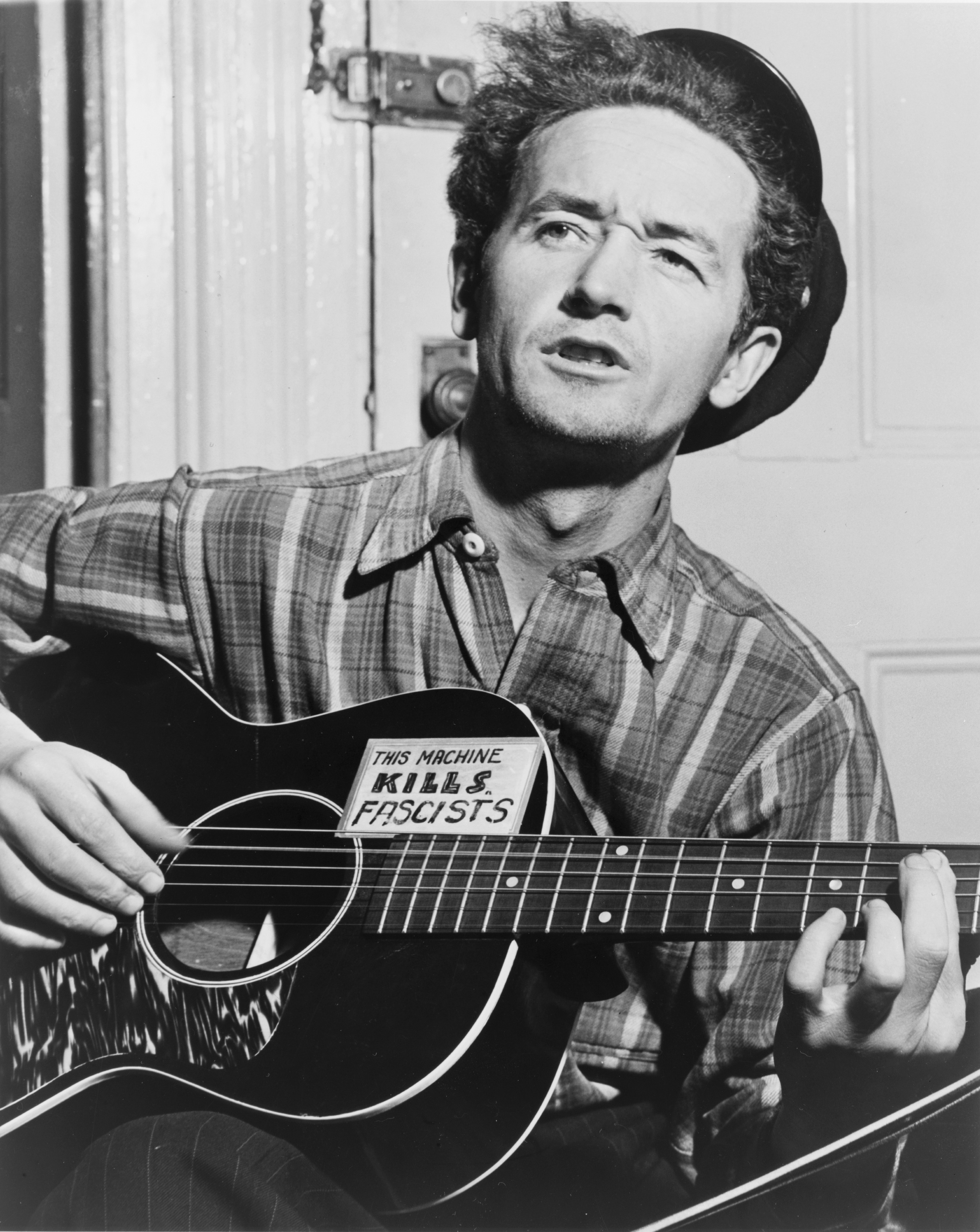
- Woody Guthrie

Song by Woody Guthrie
- Written: 1941
- Songwriter: Woody Guthrie
- Composer: based on "Goodnight, Irene"
- Lyricist: Woody Guthrie

"Roll On, Columbia, Roll On" is an American folk song written in 1941 by American folk singer Woody Guthrie, who popularized the song through his own recording of it. The song glamorized the harnessing of the Columbia River in the Pacific Northwest. The 11 hydroelectric dams built on the American stretch of the Columbia helped farms and industry, but their construction also permanently altered the character of the river.

The song became famous as an anthem about American public works projects arising out of the New Deal in the Great Depression. In 1987, it was adopted as the official folk song of the State of Washington.

== History ==
"Roll On, Columbia, Roll On" was part of the Columbia River Ballads, a set of twenty-six songs written by Guthrie as part of a commission by the Bonneville Power Administration (BPA), the federal agency created to sell and distribute power from the river's federal hydroelectric facilities (primarily Bonneville Dam and Grand Coulee Dam). At the time, the agency was facing a controversy because several counties in Washington and Oregon had begun construction of their own dams on the Columbia, outside of the federal jurisdiction. On the recommendation of Alan Lomax, the BPA hired Guthrie to write a set of propaganda songs about the federal projects to gain support for federal regulation of hydroelectricity.

As part of the effort, Guthrie, who was from Oklahoma and knew little about the Pacific Northwest, was driven all around Washington and Oregon to gain inspiration from the sites of the Columbia and its tributaries. Guthrie was glad he was able to tour and get a feel for the area, commenting that "these Pacific Northwest songs and ballads have all got these personal feelings for me because I was there on these very spots and very grounds before."

Of the Columbia River Ballads "Roll on, Columbia", which he set to a modified version of Huddie Ledbetter's "Goodnight, Irene", was by far the most popular. Because of the song's message and popularity, it was established as the official folk song of Washington in 1987.

== Historical and geographical content ==
The chorus of "Roll On, Columbia, Roll On" declares that the Columbia River is "turning the darkness to dawn". This refers to the electricity generated by the New Deal hydropower projects that brought electricity to homes in rural areas.

The first verse describes the path of the Columbia River from the Canadian Northwest to the Pacific Ocean. The second verse lists a number of the Columbia's tributaries: the Yakima, the Snake, the Klickitat, the Sandy, the Willamette, and the Hood.

In some later versions, after the first two verses, a verse was inserted describing how Thomas Jefferson had sent Lewis and Clark to explore this region. Lewis and Clark had reached the mouth of the Columbia in 1805. However, this verse did not appear in Guthrie's original recording of the song.

The next four verses describe the late 19th century American Indian Wars that took place in the Columbia basin after white settlers followed the Oregon Trail westward and were met with resistance from the Native Americans. The first three of these four verses describe a battle with a congress of the northwestern tribes in the area surrounding Cascade Locks on the Washington bank of the Columbia. If the Indians had taken the blockhouse at this location, they would have continued on into Oregon and to the Willamette Valley. However, they were stopped when Philip Henry Sheridan sailed across from Fort Vancouver with soldiers. The fourth of these verses refers to additional Indian wars that occurred "year after year", citing battles fought near Cascades Rapids, in The Dalles, and on Memaloose Isle.

The final three verses describe the construction of two Columbia River dams: Bonneville Dam and Grand Coulee Dam. Bonneville Dam had locks built into it so ships could navigate past it, alleviating worries that a dam would prevent the shipment of goods and passengers along the length of the river. Guthrie's lyrics describe Grand Coulee Dam as "the mightiest thing ever built by a man"; when it was built it was the largest concrete dam in the world, and as of 2021 it is still the largest electric power-producing facility in the United States and one of the largest concrete structures in the world.

== Cultural references ==
The Emerald City Supporters, a fan group of the Major League Soccer team Seattle Sounders FC, sing the chorus of "Roll On, Columbia" during home matches at the 12th minute, in honor of the team's first goal in MLS, scored by Colombian forward Fredy Montero in their inaugural match against New York Red Bulls on March 19, 2009.
