= Horace Heidt =

American pianist and band leader (1901–1986)

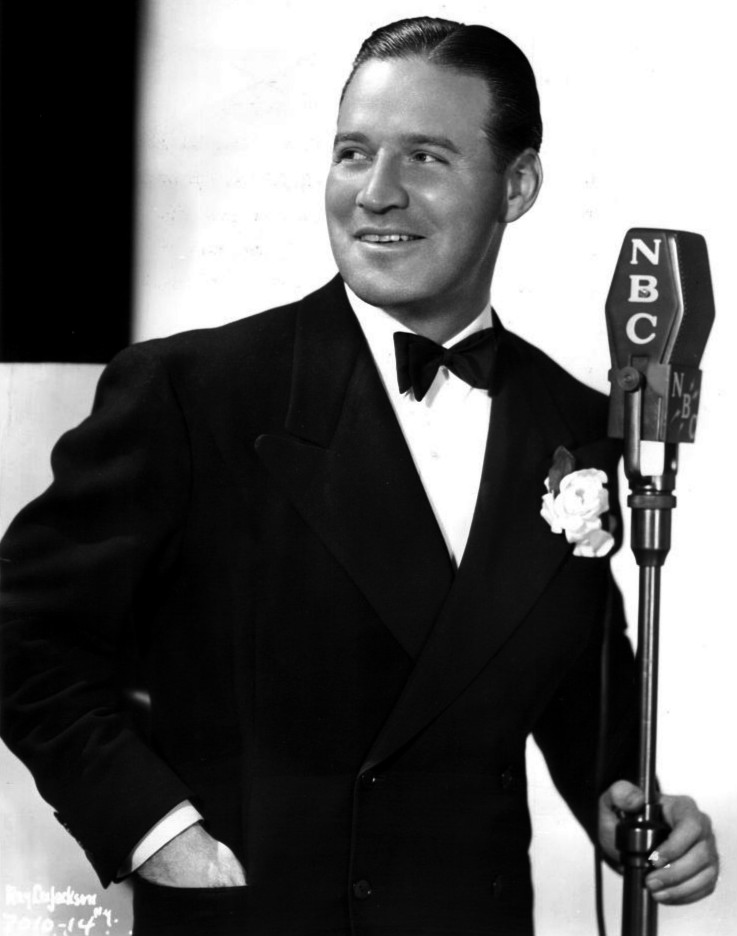
- Heidt in 1937

Background information
- Born: May 21, 1901; Alameda, California, U.S.
- Died: December 1, 1986 (aged 85) Los Angeles, California, U.S.
- Genres: Big band
- Occupations: Musician, bandleader
- Instrument: Piano

Horace Heidt (May 21, 1901 – December 1, 1986) was an American pianist, big band leader, and radio and television personality. His band, Horace Heidt and his Musical Knights, toured vaudeville and performed on radio and television during the 1930s and 1940s.

== Early years ==
Born in Alameda, California, Heidt attended Culver Academies. At the University of California, Berkeley, he was a guard on the football team. A broken back suffered in a practice session caused him to give up football, leading him to turn his attention to music. He and some classmates formed a band, The Californians.

== Career ==
Heidt and his band performing in a Vitaphone Varieties short, 1930

From 1932 to 1953, he was one of the more popular radio bandleaders, heard on both NBC and CBS in a variety of different formats over the years. He began on the NBC Blue Network in 1932 with Shell Oil's Ship of Joy and Answers by the Dancers. During the late 1930s on CBS he did Captain Dobbsie's Ship of Joy and Horace Heidt's Alemite Brigadiers before returning to NBC for 1937–39 broadcasts. It was at this time that the band featured guitarist Alvino Rey and The King Sisters.

In 1936, Horace Heidt conducted an ensemble of eight musicians all of whom played harmonica on Saturday evenings at the Drake Hotel in Chicago.

Singer Matt Dennis got his start with Heidt's band, and Art Carney was the band's singing comedian. The Heidt band's recordings were highly successful, with "Gone with the Wind" going to No. 1 in 1937 and "Ti-Pi-Tin" to No. 1 in 1938. In 1939, "The Man with the Mandolin" ranked No. 2 on the chart.

He and his band played on the NBC Pot o' Gold radio show (1939–41). The 1941 film of the same title, produced by James Roosevelt (son of the U.S. president) and directed by George Marshall, starred James Stewart and Paulette Goddard, and it featured Heidt portraying himself with his band. Carney can be glimpsed in some of the film's musical numbers. The movie gives a fairly accurate depiction of Heidt's radio show but features staged sequences, such as a scene in which a Minnesota farmer is allegedly phoned at random by Heidt during his radio show.

From 1940 to 1944 he did Tums Treasure Chest, followed by 1943–45 shows on the Blue Network. Lucky Strike sponsored The American Way on CBS in 1953.

On December 7, 1947, Heidt shortly came out of his retirement and founded a talent show. The talent show was sponsored by Phillip Morris Cigarettes, and lasted several years. The show was called "The Original Youth Opportunity Program", the first televised, traveling talent show in America. The first winner of this show was famous accordion player Dick Contino. Other discoveries of note include, Dean Jones (actor), Johnny Carson, Marlene Willis, Florence Henderson, Al Hirt, Dominic Frontiere, Richard Keith (actor), Johnny Standley, Ralph Sigwald, Conley Graves, Dick Kerr, and Doodles Weaver.

Heidt died in 1986, aged 85.

== Legacy ==
For his contribution to radio, Heidt has a star on the Hollywood Walk of Fame at 1631 Vine Street; and a second star for his contribution to television at 6628 Hollywood Boulevard. In 2001, a Golden Palm Star on the Palm Springs Walk of Stars was dedicated to him.

Heidt developed an early apartment complex in the San Fernando Valley community of Sherman Oaks, in Los Angeles, so that his band members would have a place to live when they were in town for gigs, and many of the band members eventually retired there together. Known as Horace Heidt's Magnolia Estates, the complex is a ten-acre (4.0 ha) community of apartments, swimming pools, a clubhouse, and a golf course.

== Discography ==
=== Billboard hits ===
The songs are listed with the most widely successful first.

Song	Year	Chart position
I Don't Want to Set the World on Fire	1941	US Billboard 1 – 1941 (13 weeks), Australia 1 for 2 months – Oct 1942, US 1940s 2 – Sep 1941 (11 weeks), DDD 10 of 1941, US invalid BB 17 of 1941
Deep in the Heart of Texas	1942	Australia 1 for 2 months – Dec 1943, US Billboard 7 – 1942 (6 weeks), US 1940s 7 – Mar 1942 (4 weeks)
Ti–Pi–Tin	1938	US Billboard 01 – 1938 (13 weeks); Your Hit Parade 9 of 1938
The Hut Sut Song (A Swedish Serenade)	1941	US Billboard 03 – 1941 (13 weeks), US 1940s 3 – Jun 1941 (6 weeks), DDD 46 of 1941
G'bye Now	1941	US Billboard 02 – 1941 (12 weeks), US 1940s 2 – May 1941 (7 weeks)
Gone with the Wind	1937	US Billboard 01 – 1937 (9 weeks)
This Can't Be Love	1938	US Billboard 06 – 1938 (5 weeks), Jazz Standard 123
Goodbye Dear, I'll Be Back in a Year	1941	US Billboard 03 – 1941 (14 weeks), US 1940s 8 – Jul 1941 (2 weeks)
The Man with the Mandolin	1939	US Billboard 02 – 1939 (10 weeks)
Don't Fence Me In	1945	US Billboard 10 – Feb 1945 (2 weeks), US 1940s 10 – Feb 1945 (2 weeks)
Shepherd Serenade	1941	US Billboard 07 – 1941 (8 weeks), US 1940s 7 – Dec 1941 (5 weeks)
Once in a While	1937	US Billboard 02 – 1937 (7 weeks)
Lovelight in the Starlight	1938	US Billboard 03 – 1938 (14 weeks)
Sweet as a Song	1938	US Billboard 03 – 1938 (9 weeks)
Little Heaven of the Seven Seas	1937	US Billboard 03 – 1937 (5 weeks)
Vieni Vieni	1937	US Billboard 04 – 1937 (4 weeks)
This Time It's Real	1938	US Billboard 06 – 1938 (10 weeks)
Rosalie	1938	US Billboard 06 – 1938 (4 weeks)
There's a Goldmine in the Sky	1937	US Billboard 05 – Dec 1937 (4 weeks)
Hot Lips	1937	US Billboard 05 – 1937 (4 weeks)
It's the Natural Thing to Do	1937	US Billboard 05 – 1937 (5 weeks)
Little Sir Echo	1939	US Billboard 07 – 1939 (5 weeks)
Tu–Li Tulip Time	1938	US Billboard 07 – 1938 (3 weeks)
Penny Serenade	1939	US Billboard 08 – 1939 (7 weeks)
Shabby Old Cabby	1939	US Billboard 09 – 1939 (3 weeks)
My Marguerita	1938	US Billboard 08 – 1938 (4 weeks)
I Long to Belong to You	1939	US Billboard 12 – 1939 (7 weeks)
Heigh-Ho	1938	US Billboard 12 – 1938 (2 weeks)
Sweet Someone	1937	US Billboard 09 – Dec 1937 (9 weeks)
Tomorrow Night	1939	US Billboard 16 – 1939 (1 week)
Dawn of a New Day	1939	US Billboard 17 – 1939 (2 weeks)
When They Played the Polka	1938	US Billboard 14 – 1938 (2 weeks)
That Old Black Magic	1943	US Billboard 11 – 1943 (3 weeks)
The Girl in the Bonnet of Blue	1938	US Billboard 15 – 1938 (4 weeks)
Let's Stop the Clock	1939	US Billboard 20 – 1939 (1 week)
Oh Marie Oh Marie	1937	US Billboard 12 – 1937 (2 weeks)
Lovely One	1937	US Billboard 12 – 1937 (2 weeks)
This is the Army, Mr Jones	1943	US Billboard 20 – 1943 (1 week)
The Miller's Daughter Marianne	1937	US Billboard 17 – 1937 (2 weeks)
in the Mission by the Sea	1937	US Billboard 17 – Dec 1937 (2 weeks)
Friendly Tavern Polka	1941	US Billboard 08 – 1941 (15 weeks)
Three Little Sisters	1942	US Billboard 18 – 1942 (1 week)
Little Bo Peep Has Lost Her Jeep	1942	US Billboard 19 – 1942 (2 weeks)
Pennsylvania Polka	1942	US Billboard 21 – 1942 (1 week)
When You Wish upon a Star	1940	US Billboard 12 – 1940 (5 weeks)
Carle Meets Mozart (Turkish March)	1942	US Billboard 22 – 1942 (1 week)
B–I–Bi	1941	US Billboard 10 – 1941 (10 weeks)
Make Love with a Guitar	1940	US Billboard 18 – 1940 (2 weeks)
Mamma	1941	US Billboard 14 – 1941 (6 weeks)
The Stars and Stripes Forever	1940	US Billboard 26 – 1940 (1 week)

Friendly Tavern Polka" was re-released on 3-25-44. It was US Billboard 24-1944 (1 week). "Pound Your Table Polka" sung by Mary Martin was US Billboard 22-1942 (1 week). "It's in the Book" by Johnny Standley was US Billboard 1-1952 (2 weeks) million seller.
