= Stirrup pump =

Portable, hand operated, for water

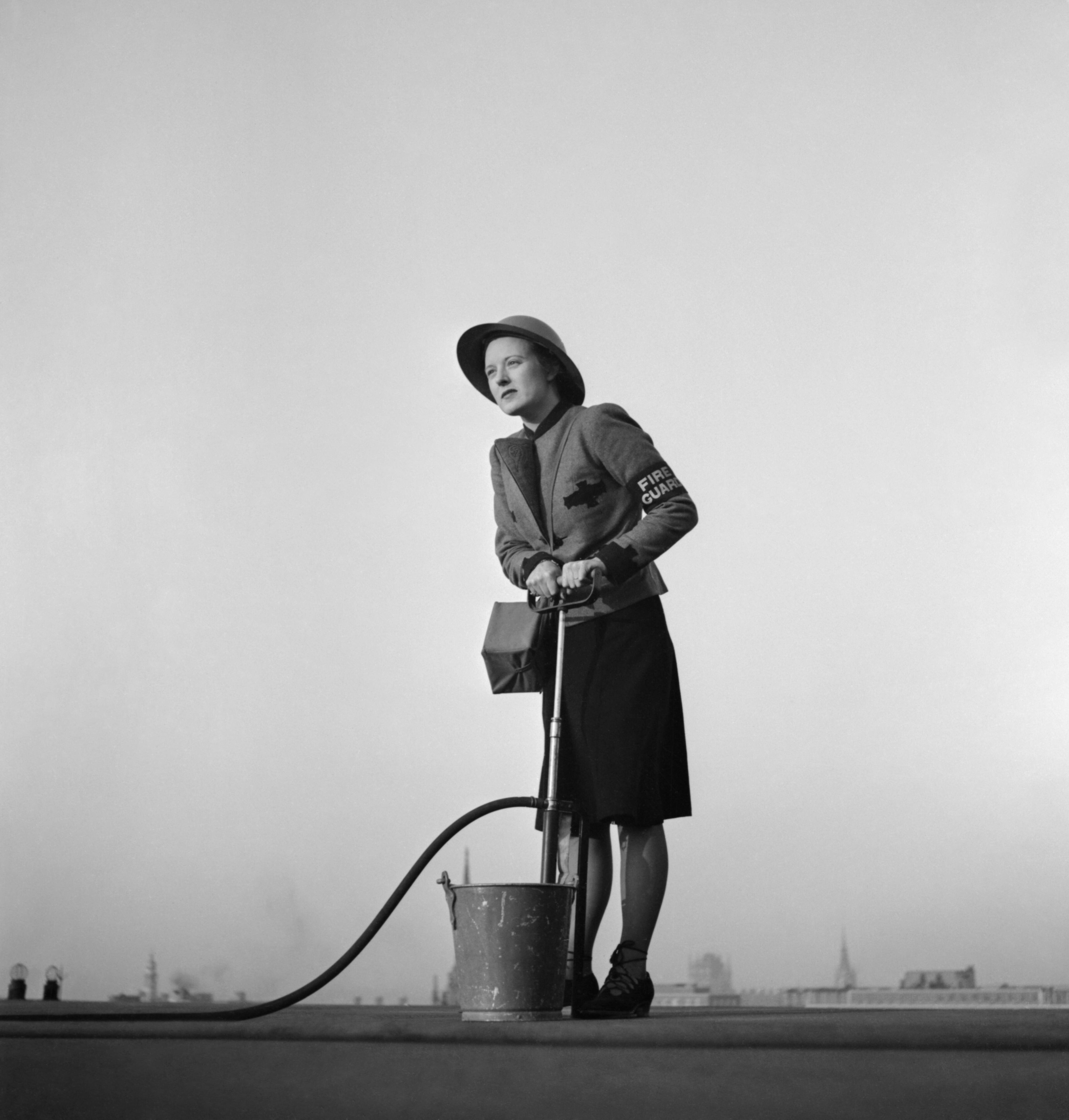
Fireguard on the roof of a building London 1941

A stirrup pump is a portable reciprocating water pump used to extinguish or control small fires. It is operated by hand. The operator places a foot on a stirrup-like bracket at the bottom of the pump to hold the pump steady, the bottom of the suction cylinder is placed inside a bucket of water.

== Gallery ==
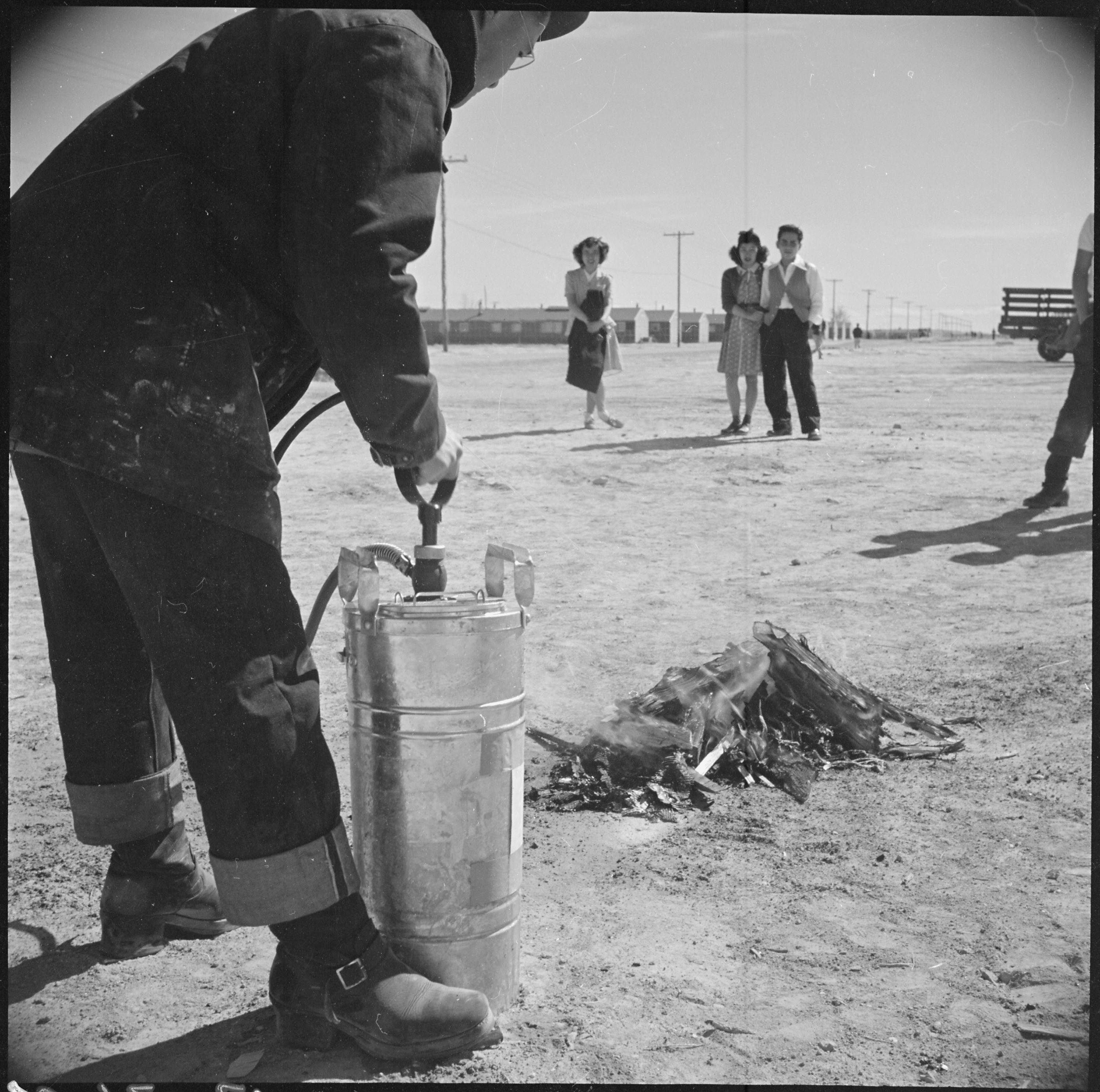
Topaz Utah 1946

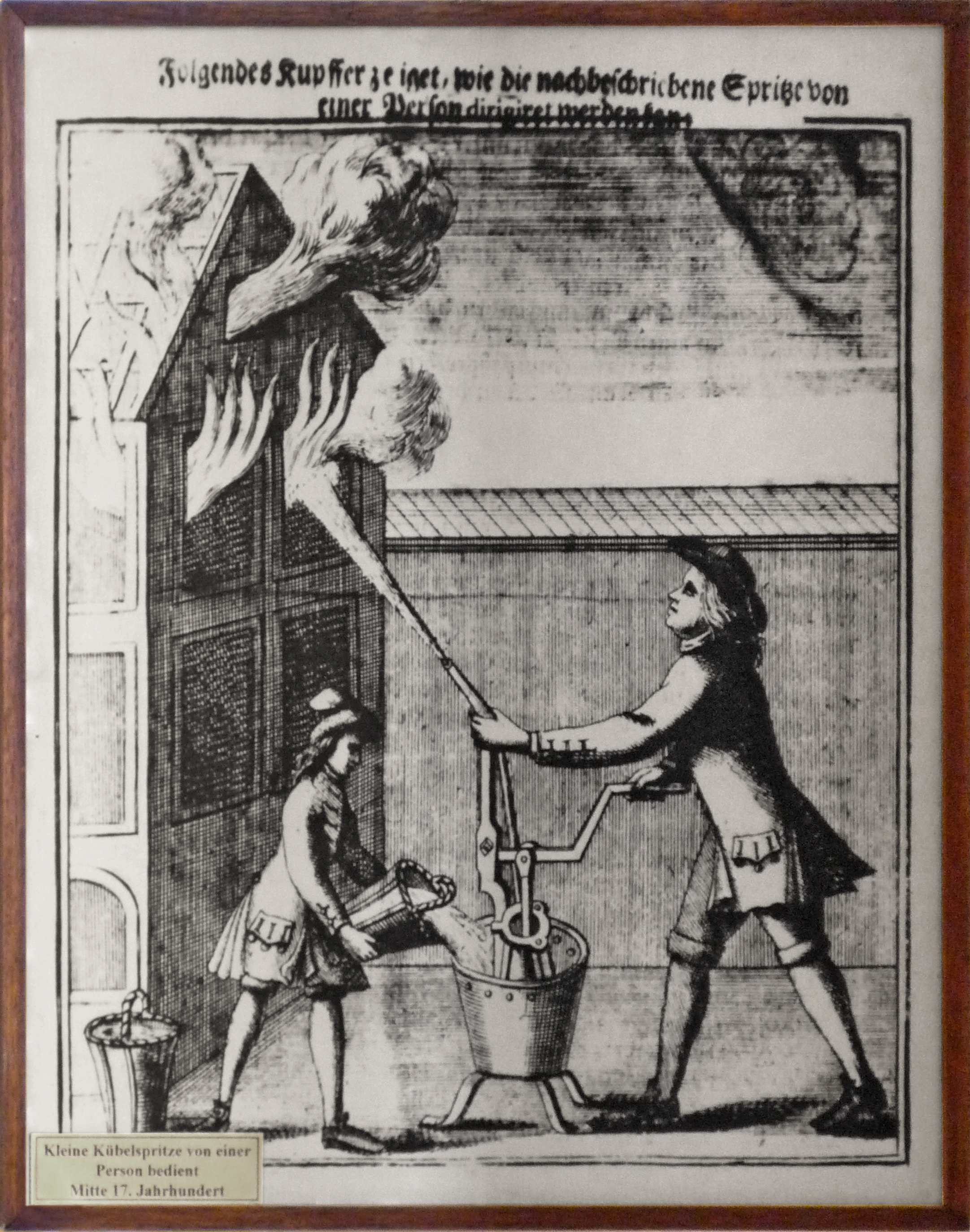
Engraving from the mid-17th Century fire museum in Salem at Lake Constance, Germany

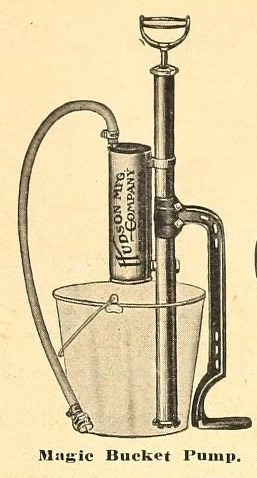
Farm and Garden Annual A Currie & Co, Milwaukee, Wis.
