= Jiří Reinberger =

Jiří Emil Reinberger (14 April 1914 – 28 May 1977) was a Czech organist, organ expert, music educator and composer.

== Early life ==
Jiří Reinberger was born on 14 April 1914 in Brno, Moravia, Austria-Hungary. He was the son of the Brno high school teacher of the same name and his wife Růžena (née Grünwald). He attended the high school in Holešov from 1925 to 1929.

He graduated from a gymnasium in Brno in 1933. As part of extracurricular studies, he had already obtained a degree in organ performance at the Brno Conservatory under Eduard Tregler in 1932. Privately, he furthered his organ studies with Bedřich Antonín Wiedermann in Prague and with Günther Ramin and Karl Straube in Leipzig. At the Brno Conservatory, he earned his degree in 1938 under Vilém Petrželka obtained a degree in Composition. He then furthered his knowledge and skills at the Prague Conservatory in the master class of the composer Vítězslav Novák, graduating with a diploma in 1940.

== Career ==
From February 1945, he taught organ at the Brno Conservatory and from 1945 to 1951 at the Prague Conservatory. From 1946, he worked as a music educator at the Music Faculty of the Academy of Performing Arts in Prague. There, he was appointed associate professor in 1954 and professor in 1964. In 1964, Reinberger was honored with the title "Meritorious Artist" (Czech: 'zasloužilý umělec').

Reinberger was involved in the preparation of the Czech television series "Varhanní hudba sedmi staletí" ("Organ Music from Seven Centuries") and the film "Československé varhany" ("Organs in Czechoslovakia"), thus contributing to the dissemination of knowledge about organ music. He also wrote the text for the illustrated book "Varhany v Československu" ("Organs in Czechoslovakia"). The introduction of international organ competitions as part of the Prague Spring Festival in 1958 was due to his initiative.

Reinberger worked as an expert and consultant for the Krnov-based organ building firm Rieger-Kloss on new organ construction projects both in Czechoslovakia and abroad, including in Bucharest, Cairo, Moscow (Tchaikovsky Concert Hall), Saint Petersburg, Tallinn, and Toronto. The new organ for the Prague Rudolfinum concert hall was built according to his design. As an expert in the design of new organs as well as the reconstruction of historical organs, Reinberger also designed the specifications for the electro-pneumatic organ in the Church of St. Martin in the Wall in Prague's Old Town and drew up a plan for the reconstruction of the organ of the Korand congregation of the Evangelical Church of Czech Brethren in Plzeň.

The summation of his career in the German music encyclopedia Die Musik in Geschichte und Gegenwart reads: "Reinberger played a crucial role in establishing the organ as a fully-fledged concert instrument at a time when its use in churches made it undesirable in public concert life in Czechoslovakia. As a performer, teacher, and consultant for organ building, he gained international recognition […] and founded a modern Czech school of organ playing characterized by a faithful and stylistically appropriate interpretation of works."

Reinberger died on 28 May 1977 in Prague.

== Selected Works ==
- *Symphony in G minor* (1938)
- *Symphony No. 2 in F minor* (1958)
- *Concerto for Cello and Orchestra* (1958)
- *Concerto in A minor for Organ and Orchestra* (1940)
- *Concerto No. 2 in C minor for Organ and Orchestra* (1955)
- *Concerto No. 3 for Organ and String Orchestra* (1960)

== Bibliography ==
- J. Kubáň: Malá varhanní kronika [Eine kleine Orgelchronik]. In: 150 let pražské konzervatoře, Prague, 1961, Pp. 37–72.
- J. Kozák: Českoslovenští koncertní umělce a komorní soubory [Tschechoslowakische Konzertkünstler und Kammerensembles]. Prague, 1964, Pp. 99–102.
- J. Kříž: Bilance zdaleka neuzavřená [Die Bilanz ist noch lange nicht abgeschlossen]. In: Hudební rozhledy, 17, 1964, P. 284.
- Gracian Černušák: Reinberger, Jiří. In: Československý hudební slovník osob a institucí, Prague, 1965, Vol.. 2, P. 409.
- Author=Jan Popelka, Jaroslav Tvrzský|Subject=Reinberger, Jiří |Edition=2|Volume=P13|ID=mgg10697; https://www.mgg-online.com/articles/mgg10697/1.0/mgg10697
