= The Fabulous Dorseys =

1947 film by Alfred E. Green

- Directed by: Alfred E. Green
- Screenplay by: Art Arthur; Curtis Kenyon
- Based on: The Battling Brothers Dorsey; 1946 The Saturday Evening Post by Richard English
- Produced by: Charles R. Rogers
- Starring: Tommy Dorsey; Jimmy Dorsey; Janet Blair
- Cinematography: James Van Trees
- Edited by: George M. Arthur
- Music by: Louis Forbes; Leo Shuken
- Production company: Charles R. Rogers Productions
- Distributed by: United Artists.
- Release date: February 21, 1947 (US)
- Running time: 88 minutes
- Country: United States
- Language: English

The Fabulous Dorseys is a 1947 American musical biopic film released by Allied Artists. Starring Big Band musicians and orchestra leaders brothers Tommy and Jimmy Dorsey, it tells the story of their boyhood in Shenandoah, Pennsylvania, rise together to stardom, breakup, and reunion. It was directed by Alfred E. Green, and produced by Charles R. Rogers, the film co-stars actress and Big Band singer Janet Blair. The film also appeared under the alternative title The Fighting Dorseys.

== Plot ==
In 1916, Shenandoah, Pennsylvania, coal miner Thomas Dorsey, Sr, moonlights as a music teacher. He insists his sons Jimmy Dorsey, 9, and Tommy Dorsey, 7, learn the saxophone and trombone, respectively, to avoid ending up in the grueling mines. Initially, the boys are resentful of long hours of practice and their father's strict discipline. Their mother, Theresa, thinks her husband is too hard on their sons. Childhood friend Janie Howard watches them practice.

When Thomas Sr loses his mining job, he pitches his family "band" to the owner of Gorman’s Hall, a public dance hall. Knowing Thomas's sons are roughly 10 and 12, Gorman hesitates. Tomas Sr convinces him to give the band a chance, paying them only if he's satisfied.

At their first engagement, the band plays the Turkey Trot. The patrons dance and applaud politely, but Gorman is unimpressed. When the band begins a waltz, Tommy improvises on trombone in swing tempo, and Jimmy joins in on sax. The crowd becomes more enthusiastic, and Gorman hires them.

In the early 1920s, the boys, with Janie singing, tour with their band, the Wild Canaries. Struggling to meet expenses between one-night engagements, their piano player leaves before the band departs for Jefferson City, Missouri,. Jimmy and Tommy enlist Robert Burton, a piano player for silent films at the local movie theater. Their agent sends a telegram that their engagement is cancelled with no further bookings. They receive an offer to join the popular band of Paul Whiteman, "The King of Jazz." Tommy does not relay the Whiteman offer to Jimmy.

Attracted to Jane, Robert sticks around, playing his composition, “To Me,” for Jane to sing. Offered $50 to participate in a radio experiment testing a live orchestra's reception on the air over 50 to 60 miles, they play "Runnin' Wild" too loudly. When Tommy takes a solo and Jimmy objects, they get into another of their constant arguments live over the air. Two more band members leave. Jimmy blames Tommy for concealing the Whiteman offer.

Tommy and Jimmy join the prestigious Paul Whiteman band in New York. On the side, the Dorseys plug songs for sheet music sales and reunite with Burton, who has published “To Me.” The Dorseys, with Robert and Jane, form the Dorsey Brothers Orchestra. Robert works on his ambitious instrumental composition, "The American Concerto". Robert and Jane become engaged, but she hesitates to desert the struggling Tommy and Jimmy, who bicker constantly over jazz styles and leadership. Tommy thinks the rhythm should be livelier; Jimmy thinks it's too fast.

The band plays with Jazz pianist Art Tatum. Jane sings "The Object of My Affection" and "I'll Never Say Never Again". After another argument, Tommy walks out for good. Robert gives Jane an ultimatum. If she goes now, they are through. Jane stays with Tommy, who she believes needs her more than Jimmy.

Tommy Dorsey forms his own orchestra and has a hit with "Moonlight in Vermont". Jimmy continues with the rebranded "Jimmy Dorsey Band". Jimmy sets records for dance band attractions, voted the Jukebox King, and Tommy is radio pick as best Swing band. They tie for top place in April disc sales. Jimmy has hits with "Tangerine," "Green Eyes (Bob Eberley and Helen O’Connell perform their hit) ," and "Amapola." Tommy Dorsey has hits with "I'll Never Smile Again," "I'm Getting Sentimental Over You," and "Oh Marie".

Their mother is sad at the brothers' estrangement and refusal to reconcile. Seeking to bring them together, Jane schemes to give Whiteman a copy of Robert's unpublished "American Concerto" without Robert's knowledge. Whiteman convinces Jimmy and Tommy—without the other's knowledge—to play a new "American Concerto" at a charity benefit. At rehearsal, both Tommy and Jimmy initially refuse to play together. When their father becomes seriously ill, they both arrive to say goodbye to him. They concede to their father's last wish to reconcile, a comfort to their mother.

The Whiteman concert is a success, where Robert is surprised to find Jane sitting next to Mrs. Dorsey. Robert recognizes his concerto and reconciles with Jane. Jimmy and Tommy play a clarinet and saxophone duet.

== Cast ==
- Tommy Dorsey as himself
- Jimmy Dorsey as himself
- Janet Blair as Jane Howard
- Paul Whiteman as himself
- William Lundigan as Robert Burton
- Sara Allgood as Mrs. Dorsey
- Arthur Shields as Tommy Dorsey Sr.
- Dave Willock as Foggy
- William Bakewell as Eddie
- James Flavin as Gorman
- Charlie Barnet as himself
- Bob Eberly as himself
- Henry Busse as Bandleader
- Helen O'Connell as herself
- Mike Pingitore as musician
- Art Tatum as himself

== Production ==
Written by Art Arthur, Richard English and Curtis Kenyon, and directed by Alfred E. Green, the film is based on the lives and careers of musicisans, orchestra leaders, and Swing music stars Tommy and Jimmy Dorsey. The Dorsey Brothers star as themselves. Former Big Band vocalist and actress Janet Blair co-stars. Other actors include William Lundigan, Sara Allgood and Arthur Shields.

The "side plot" focuses on a romance between Jane, who grew up with the Dorseys and becomes the singer with their band, and Bob Burton, who leaves his employment as a support pianist for the cinema and joins the Dorseys. Bob writes music and strives to complete an original American-sound concerto.

There are also cameo appearances by other jazz musicians of the period: Paul Whiteman, Charlie Barnet, Henry Busse, Bob Eberly, Helen O'Connell and Art Tatum. Pianist Tatum "is shown playing in a night club with the piano surrounded by the Dorsey brothers and other well-known musicians, who finally join him in an ensemble blues."

The Jimmy Dorsey composition and theme song "Contrasts" is played in the movie. "Green Eyes", "Tangerine", "I'll Never Smile Again", "Marie", and "I'm Getting Sentimental Over You" are also featured in the movie, along with "To Me" and "Dorsey Concerto". Paul Whiteman and the Orchestra perform "At Sundown". Art Tatum performs "Turquoise" and "Art's Blues" at the piano.
