= Devil May Care (album) =

Studio album by Teri Thornton
- Released: 1961
- Recorded: December 23, 1960 and January 10, 1961; New York City
- Genre: Jazz
- Length: 39:19
- Label: Riverside; RLP 352
- Producer: Orrin Keepnews

Teri Thornton chronology
Devil May Care (1961)	Open Highway (1963)

Devil May Care (also rereleased as Lullaby of the Leaves) is the debut album by American jazz vocalist Teri Thornton featuring tracks recorded in late 1960 and early 1961 for the Riverside label.

== Reception ==
Professional ratings
Review scores
Source	Rating
Allmusic	4.5/5 stars

Allmusic awarded the album 4½ stars with the review by Michael G. Nastos stating, "This is an important document of a truly great jazz singer, and is essential in the collection of every serious aficionado".

== Track listing ==
1. "Lullaby of the Leaves" (Bernice Petkere, Joe Young) – 2:48
2. "Devil May Care" (Bob Dorough) – 2:47
3. "Detour Ahead" (Lou Carter, Herb Ellis, Johnny Frigo) – 3:10
4. "The Song Is You" (Oscar Hammerstein II, Jerome Kern) – 2:33
5. "My Old Flame" (Sam Coslow, Arthur Johnston) – 3:29
6. "What's Your Story, Morning Glory?" (Jack Lawrence, Paul Francis Webster, Mary Lou Williams) – 3:47
7. "Dancing in the Dark" (Howard Dietz, Arthur Schwartz) – 2:31
8. "Left Alone" (Billie Holiday, Mal Waldron) – 3:27
9. "Blue Champagne" (Jim Eaton, Frank L. Ryerson, Grady Watts) – 3:11
10. "I Feel a Song Coming On" (Dorothy Fields, Jimmy McHugh, George Oppenheimer) – 2:42
11. "What's New?" (Johnny Burke, Bob Haggart) – 4:11
12. "Blue Skies" (Irving Berlin) – 2:33

== Personnel ==
- Teri Thornton – vocals
- Clark Terry – flugelhorn, trumpet
- Britt Woodman – trombone
- Earle Warren – alto saxophone
- Seldon Powell – tenor saxophone
- Wynton Kelly – piano
- Freddie Green (tracks 1, 3, 5, 7, 9 & 12), Sam Herman (tracks 2, 4, 6, 8, 10 & 11) – guitar
- Sam Jones – bass
- Jimmy Cobb – drums
- Norman Simmons – arranger
- Recorded in New York City on December 23, 1960 (tracks 1, 3, 5, 7, 9 & 12) and January 10, 1961 (tracks 2, 4, 6, 8, 10 & 11).
