= Richard the Lion-Hearted – Dick Haymes That Is! =

Richard the Lion-Hearted - Dick Haymes That Is!

Studio album by Dick Haymes
- Released: 1960
- Genre: Pop, Jazz
- Label: Warwick

Professional ratings
Review scores
Source	Rating
Allmusic	Not rated link

Richard the Lion-Hearted - Dick Haymes That Is! is an album from Dick Haymes. Released in 1960, arranged & conducted by Ralph Burns. A review by Christopher Loudon in Jazz Times summed up the album by saying "Though Haymes would return to the recording studio in the 1970s and manage a minor resurgence, it seems a fitting adieu to an underappreciated master who spend too much time in an even bigger giant’s (Sinatra's) shadow."

== Track listing ==
1. "Pick Yourself Up" (Jerome Kern, Dorothy Fields)
2. "Blue Champagne" (Grady Watts, Frank L. Ryerson)
3. "Paris Is My Old Kentucky Home"
4. "There's No You" (Hal Hopper, Tom Adair)
5. "Playboy Theme" (Cy Coleman, Carolyn Leigh)
6. "Anything Goes" (Cole Porter)
7. "That's For Me" (Richard Rodgers, Oscar Hammerstein II)
8. "I've Heard That Song Before" (Jule Styne, Sammy Cahn)
9. "Lulu's Back In Town" (Harry Warren, Al Dubin)
10. "Serenade in Blue" (Harry Warren, Mack Gordon)
11. "As Long as I Live" (Harold Arlen, Ted Koehler)
12. "I Concentrate on You" (Cole Porter)
