= My Sister and I =

My Sister and I may refer to:

== Theatre, film, and television ==
- Ma sœur et moi (My Sister and I), a play by Georges Berr and Louis Verneuil
- Meine Schwester und ich (My Sister and I), a 1930 operetta adaptation of the Berr and Verneuil play, by Ralph Benatzky
- My Sister and I (1929 film), a German adaptation of the Berr and Verneuil play, directed by Manfred Noa
- My Sister and I (1948 film), a British drama film directed by Harold Huth
- My Sister and I (1950 film), a Swedish comedy film directed by Schamyl Bauman
- My Sister and I (1954 film), a West German adaptation of the Benatzky operetta, directed by Paul Martin
- My Sister and I (1987 film) or Io e mia sorella, an Italian film by Carlo Verdone
- My Sister and I (TV series), a 1956 British sitcom

== Other uses ==
- My Sister and I (Nietzsche), an apocryphal work attributed to Friedrich Nietzsche
- My Sister and I: The Diary of a Dutch Boy Refugee, a 1941 book by Dirk Van Der Heide
- "My Sister and I" (song), a 1941 song by Jimmy Dorsey

== See also ==
- Me and My Sister, an English pop band
- Les Sœurs fâchées, a 2004 French film distributed as Me and My Sister
