= The Manhattan Transfer (album) =

Studio album by The Manhattan Transfer
- Released: April 2, 1975
- Studio: Atlantic, New York City
- Genre: Jazz
- Label: Atlantic/WEA
- Producer: Ahmet Ertegun, Tim Hauser

The Manhattan Transfer chronology
Jukin' (1971)	The Manhattan Transfer (1975)	Coming Out (1976)

The Manhattan Transfer is the second album by The Manhattan Transfer. However, it is the first of four albums to be released by the lineup of Tim Hauser, Laurel Massé, Alan Paul, and Janis Siegel, and the first to establish the sound and style for which the group would become known. It was released on April 2, 1975, by Atlantic Records and was produced by Ahmet Ertegün and Tim Hauser.

This incarnation of the group had been together for three years before this album was released. Ertegün, founder and chairman of Atlantic, attended one of their performances at the New York City cabaret Reno Sweeney. He offered them a contract, which they accepted.

== Reviews ==
Professional ratings
Review scores
Source	Rating
allmusic	3/5 stars

Shaun Considine reviewed the album in May 1975 for The New York Times:

"Vocally, The Manhattan Transfer is one of the slickest group's on today's market. Their intro number, "Tuxedo Junction", is a precise recreation of the 1940 Glenn Miller oldie, with the group's four part vocal harmonies and jazz riffs supplanting the Miller instrumentals. They have done their homework; they have studied their old 78s in detail. In the honors section, "Blue Champagne", a Dorsey beauty, and "Candy" evoke all of the magic and hazy charm of the 30s and 40s."

== Charts ==
The Manhattan Transfer debuted on Billboard's Top Pop album chart on May 3, 1975, reaching #33. The single "Operator" went to #22 on Billboard's Hot 100 singles chart.

"Tuxedo Junction" reached #24 on the British pop charts.

== Track listing ==
1. "Tuxedo Junction" (Erskine Hawkins, William Johnson, Buddy Feyne, Julian Dash) - 3:01
2. "Sweet Talking Guy" (Doug Morris, Elliot Greenberg) - 2:25
3. "Operator" (William Spivery) - 3:09 (derived from "Operator, Operator" by Sister Wynona Carr)
4. "Candy" (Mack David, Joan Whitney, Alex Kramer) - 3:26
5. "Gloria" (Esther Navarro) - 2:57
6. "Clap Your Hands" (Ira Newborn, The Manhattan Transfer) - 2:55
7. "That Cat Is High" (J. M. Williams) - 2:53
8. "You Can Depend on Me" (Earl Hines, Charles Carpenter, Louis Dunlap) - 3:30
9. "Blue Champagne" (Frank Ryerson, Grady Watts, Jimmy Eaton) - 2:21
10. "Java Jive" (Milton Drake, Ben Oakland) - 2:44
11. "Occapella" (Allen Toussaint) - 3:04
12. "Heart's Desire" (Hugh X. Lewis, George Cox, James Dozier, Ralph Ingram, Bernard Purdie) - 2:36

== Personnel ==
The Manhattan Transfer

- Tim Hauser – vocals, vocal arrangements, arrangements (2)
- Laurel Massé – vocals, vocal arrangements, tambourine (2, 6)
- Alan Paul – vocals, vocal arrangements
- Janis Siegel – vocals, vocal arrangements

Musicians

- Don Grolnick – acoustic piano, electric piano (1, 3, 4, 6, 7, 9, 12), clavinet (2, 11)
- Murray Weinstock – organ (2, 5)
- Richard Tee – organ (3), electric piano (11)
- Ira Newborn – guitar, musical director, conductor, arrangements
- Jerry Friedman – guitar (3, 6, 11)
- Andy Muson – bass guitar (1–9, 11, 12)
- Roy Markowitz – drums (1–9, 11, 12)
- Daniel Ben Zebulon – congas (11)
- Mike Rod – tenor sax solo (1)
- Michael Brecker – tenor sax solo (3)
- Zoot Sims – tenor sax solo (8)
- Gene Orloff – concertmaster (6, 12)

Brass Section

- Clarinets – Phil Bodner, Wally Kane and Seldon Powell
- Alto saxophones – Phil Bodner, Jerry Dodgion, George Dorsey, Harvey Estrin, David Sanborn and George Young
- Baritone saxophones – Lew Del Gatto and Wally Kane
- Tenor saxophones – Michael Brecker, Seldon Powell, Mike Rod and Frank Vicari
- Trombones – Wayne Andre, Garnett Brown, Paul Favlise, Mickey Gravine, Quentin Jackson and Alan Raph
- Trumpets – Randy Brecker, Mel Davis, Jon Faddis, Marky Markowitz, Bob McCoy, Alan Rubin and Marvin Stamm

=== Production ===
- Producers – Tim Hauser and Ahmet Ertegun
- Production Assistance – Geoffrey Haslam and Arif Mardin
- Engineer and Remix – Lew Hahn
- Additional Engineers – Geoffrey Haslam and Gene Paul
- Art Direction – Bob Defrin
- Artwork – Fred Eric Spione
- Liner Photography – David Gahr
- Management – Aaron Russo

== References / Sources ==
- The Manhattan Transfer Official Website
- Retrieved from discogs February 1, 2011
