= Jigsaw (The Shadows album) =

Studio album by The Shadows
- Released: July 1967
- Recorded: 1967
- Genre: Rock
- Length: 37:03
- Label: EMI
- Producer: Norrie Paramor

The Shadows chronology
Shadow Music (1966)	Jigsaw (1967)	From Hank, Bruce, Brian and John (1967)

Professional ratings
Review scores
Source	Rating
Allmusic	3.5/5 stars

Jigsaw is the sixth and the first fully instrumental rock album by The Shadows, a British instrumental (and sometimes vocal) group. It was released in 1967 through EMI Records.

== Track listing ==
Side one
No.	Title	Writer(s)	Length
1.	"Jigsaw"	Hank Marvin, Bruce Welch, John Rostill, Brian Bennett	02:36
2.	"Tennessee Waltz"	Pee Wee King, Redd Stewart	02:58
3.	"Prelude in E Major"	Hank Marvin, John Rostill, Brian Bennett	02:42
4.	"Cathy's Clown"	Don Everly	02:31
5.	"Stardust"	Hoagy Carmichael	03:06
6.	"Semi-Detached, Suburban Mr. James"	Geoff Stephens, John Carter	02:50
7.	"Trains and Boats and Planes"	Burt Bacharach, Hal David	02:19
Total length:			19:02

Side two
No.	Title	Writer(s)	Length
1.	"Friday on My Mind"	George Young, Harry Vanda	02:51
2.	"Winchester Cathedral"	Geoff Stephens	02:51
3.	"Waiting for Rosie"	John Rostill	02:13
4.	"Chelsea Boot"	Peter Vince	01:52
5.	"Maria Elena"	Lorenzo Barcelata	03:10
6.	"With a Hmm-Hmm on My Knee"	Cliff Richard	01:58
7.	"Green Eyes"	Nilo Menéndez	03:06
Total length:			18:01

== Personnel ==
- Hank Marvin - Lead guitar and mandolin
- Bruce Welch - Rhythm guitar
- John Rostill - Bass guitar
- Brian Bennett - Drums and percussion
- Norrie Paramor - Producer

== Charts ==
Chart (1967)	Peak position
UK Albums Chart	8
Australian Albums Chart	7
