= Jim (song) =

Song by Jimmy Dorsey and His Orchestra
- Released: September 20, 1941
- Recorded: August 1, 1941
- Label: Decca 3963
- Songwriters: Nelson Shawn, Caesar Petrillo, Edward Ross

Jimmy Dorsey and His Orchestra singles chronology
"Blue Champagne" (1941)	"Jim" (1941)	"Tangerine" (1942)

"Jim" is a popular song with music by James Caesar Petrillo and Milton Samuels (who also used the pseudonym Edward Ross), lyrics by Nelson Shawn. The song was published in 1941.

Two versions reached the Billboard charts in 1941: Jimmy Dorsey and His Orchestra (vocals by Bob Eberly and Helen O'Connell), which peaked at No. 2; and Dinah Shore (No. 5).

It has also been recorded by Billie Holiday, Sarah Vaughan, Ella Fitzgerald, Aretha Franklin and many other artists. An instrumental version was recorded in 1964, by Oscar Peterson, featuring Clark Terry, for the album Oscar Peterson Trio + One.
