= María Elena (song) =

1932 song by Lorenzo Barcelata

"Maria Elena"

Single by Jimmy Dorsey and His Orchestra (vocals Bob Eberly)
- B-side: "Green Eyes"
- Released: April 1941
- Recorded: 19 March 1941
- Label: Decca
- Songwriters: Lorenzo Barcelata; Music and Spanish lyrics Bob Russell; English lyrics

Jimmy Dorsey and His Orchestra (vocals Bob Eberly) singles chronology
"Yours" (1941)	"Maria Elena" (1941)	"My Sister and I" (1941)

"Maria Elena"

Single by Los Indios Tabajaras
- A-side: "Jungle Dream"
- Released: 1963
- Genre: Instrumental
- Length: 3:09
- Label: RCA Victor
- Songwriter: Lorenzo Barcelata

Los Indios Tabajaras singles chronology
"Maria Elena" (1963)	"Always in My Heart" (1964)

"María Elena" is a 1932 popular song written by Lorenzo Barcelata (Spanish words and music). It was published by Peer International Corporation of Mexico. The English lyrics are by Bob Russell.

This song "María Elena", (also known as "Tuyo es mi corazón") originally written for Lucía Martínez García at the request of Ernesto Soto Reyes, Lucía's husband, for which he paid $10,000 pesos at the time. Shortly after, before registering it, Barcelata showed it to his businessman friend Anacarsis "Carcho" Peralta, who loved it, and curiously, it soon appeared registered as "María Elena", the name of a girlfriend the businessman had.

== Jimmy Dorsey recording ==
The song was a number one hit for the Jimmy Dorsey orchestra with Bob Eberly on vocals. The recording was made on March 19, 1941 by Decca Records as catalog number 3698. The flip side was "Green Eyes". The record first reached the Billboard charts on May 16, 1941 and lasted 17 weeks on the chart, peaking at No. 1 on June 14, 1941. The record was number one for two weeks. Since "Green Eyes" was also a No. 1 hit, this was a major double-sided hit recording.

== Cover versions ==
- A version with an English language lyric was recorded in February 1940 by Adolph Hofner and his Texans, one of the great Western Swing bands, in Dallas.
- Lawrence Welk brought the song wide attention in the United States on his radio program, then in 1941 on the Okeh Records label.
- In the same year of 1941, The Wayne King Orchestra also had a #2 hit with "Maria Elena".
- Nat King Cole recorded "Maria Elena" in 1958, and it was released on August 1, 1958.
- An instrumental version was recorded in 1958 and released in the United States as a single by Los Indios Tabajaras in 1963. This popular revival hit No. 6 in the Billboard pop chart and No. 3 on the Billboard easy listening chart in the US in late 1963, as well as making No. 5 on the UK singles chart at the same juncture.
- Family Four released a Swedish version (called "Mari Helena"), crediting Henrick Lindström (and L. Barcelata), in 1966.
- The Shadows performed an instrumental version of this song on their 1967 album Jigsaw.
- Ry Cooder performed an instrumental version of this song on his 1972 album Boomer's Story.
- German guitarist Dieter Geike recorded an instrumental version on his 1983 album Homeland.
- Sneaky Pete Kleinow, formerly pedal steel guitarist with the Flying Burrito Brothers, recorded an instrumental version of this song on his 1994 album The Legend and the Legacy.
- Dick Dale also performed an instrumental version on his 1994 album Unknown Territory.
- Cesária Évora released a cover of the song on her 1999 album, Café Atlantico.
- In 2002, Michael Bublé released his own version on the album Dream.
- Mike Dowling recorded an instrumental version on his 2005 Blue Fandango album.
- In 2019, the album "Por Amor" was recorded in the studio by the Mexican tenor Mauro Calderón

== Popular culture ==
- An instrumental version of the song was used for the background theme of the film Bordertown, starring Paul Muni and Bette Davis, in 1935. The next year the words and music were used in the Mexican film María Elena.
- The Xavier Cugatʼs version is used in Wong Kar Wai film Days of Being Wild (1990), starring Leslie Cheung.
