= John Silver (song) =

1938 single by Jimmy Dorsey and Ray Krise

1938 release on Decca Records, 1860B.

1938 Decca 78, 3334A, reissued as part of a 78 album.

John Silver is a 1938 song written by Jimmy Dorsey with Ray Krise. Jimmy Dorsey and His Orchestra released the song as a 78 single on Decca in 1938.

Jimmy Dorsey and His Orchestra recorded "John Silver" on April 29, 1938, and released the song as a Decca 78, 3334A, Matrix # 63689, with Bob Eberly on vocals. The single reached no. 13 on Billboard in 1938, staying on the charts for 2 weeks.

The composers of the words and music were Jimmy Dorsey and Ray Krise. The publisher was Bregman, Vocco, and Conn, Inc., in New York.

Jimmy Dorsey also released the song as recorded in 1938 as a V-Disc, No. 117B. The instrumental was also re-arranged and released as "Long John Silver" as V-Disc No. 409B in April, 1945 by Jimmy Dorsey and His Orchestra.

The song was performed by Jimmy Dorsey and His Orchestra in an arrangement by Sonny Burke in the 1944 Metro-Goldwyn-Mayer movie Lost in a Harem starring Bud Abbott and Lou Costello.

The song was also re-released as a 10" orange label Coral Records 78 single as #60296.

== Other recordings ==
Glen Gray and the Casa Loma Orchestra recorded a version of "John Silver" which appeared on the 2001 swing and big band compilation The Swing Era: 1938-1939 on Time Life Music, EMI-Capitol Special Markets. The BBC Big Band released a recording of the song in 1996.

== Sources ==
- Stockdale, Robert L. Jimmy Dorsey: A Study in Contrasts. (Studies in Jazz Series). Lanham, MD: The Scarecrow Press, Inc., 1999.
- Arnold, Jay, ed. Jimmy Dorsey Saxophone Method: A School of Rhythmic Saxophone Playing. Warner Bros Pubns, 1999.
- Sanford, Herb. Tommy and Jimmy: The Dorsey Years. (Introduction by Bing Crosby). DaCapo Press, 1980.
- Bockemuehl, Eugene. On the Road with the Jimmy Dorsey Aggravation, 1947-1949. Gray Castle Press, 1996
