= I'm Glad There Is You =

1941 song written by Jimmy Dorsey and Paul Madeira

1942 Decca 78, 4197-B, by Jimmy Dorsey and His Orchestra featuring Bob Eberly on vocals.

Decca 78 single, 18799A, 1946.

"I'm Glad There Is You (In This World of Ordinary People)" is a song written by Jimmy Dorsey and Paul Madeira (sometimes credited as Paul Mertz) first published in 1941. It has become a jazz and pop standard.

== Original recording ==
The song was released by Jimmy Dorsey and His Orchestra in 1942 by Decca Records backed with "Tomorrow's Sunrise" featuring Bob Eberly on vocals. The song was recorded on December 22, 1941, in New York City. The recording was reviewed in Billboard: "With the customary Dorsey eclat, Jimmy enters two new ballads in this couplet....Maestro Jimmy had a hand in writing the plattermate. It's a love song, with the story steeped in philosophical thoughts rather than June-moon wordage. Eberly sings it from edge, saxophones and Jimmy's clarinet carving a half chorus for themselves before Bob is brought back to finish it out." The song was also released in 1946, recorded on February 6, 1946, by Jimmy Dorsey and His Orchestra with Dee Parker on vocals. The B side was "Ain't Misbehavin".

The 1941 original Decca recording by Jimmy Dorsey and His Orchestra featuring Bob Eberly on vocals appears on the 2011 various artists compilation album 100 Swing Jazz Classics by Masters Classics Records. The 1946 Decca re-recording by Jimmy Dorsey and His Orchestra featuring Parker on vocals appears on the 2011 collection Jazz Compilation, Vol. 1 by Digital Natives.

Jimmy Dorsey and Paul Madeira Mertz collaborated on the lyrics and the music. Paul Madeira, who is also known as Paul Madeira Mertz, was a jazz pianist and arranger who had first worked with Jimmy and Tommy Dorsey in 1922 in their first orchestra The Wild Canaries. Mertz had been a pianist in the Bix Beiderbecke band The Rhythm Jugglers in the 1920s and had worked in Hollywood on film music from the 1930s to the 1960s. He had played on the 1925 jazz classic "Davenport Blues" in 1925 released on Gennett Records. Mertz also played piano on the 1927 Grammy Hall of Fame inductee "Singin' the Blues" by Frankie Trumbauer and his Orchestra featuring Bix Beiderbecke, Eddie Lang, and Jimmy Dorsey. He had also composed the jazz instrumental "Hurricane", which was recorded by Miff Mole and Red Nichols in 1927.

== Cover versions ==
1942 sheet music cover for "I'm Glad There Is You", Mayfair Music Corp., New York.

The song has since been recorded by numerous artists. "I'm Glad There is You" has been covered by Frank Sinatra, Carmen McRae, Ella Fitzgerald, Lena Horne, Ginny Simms, Mel Tormé, Tony Bennett, Grover Washington Jr., Paul Anka, Alvino Rey, Chris Connor, Jamie Cullum, Arthur Prysock, Lillie Kae, Chet Baker, Sarah Vaughan, Mildred Bailey, Ray Anthony, Dorothy Squires, Shirley Bassey, Smokey Robinson, Johnny Mathis, Robert Goulet, Connie Francis, Natalie Cole, Johnny Hartman, Julie London, Jackie Gleason, Cannonball Adderley, Rosemary Clooney, The Temptations, Toni Tennille, The Lettermen, Dick Hyman, Chris Montez, June Christy, Wesla Whitfield, Don Cherry.

The Frank Sinatra version, released as a Columbia Records single, 40229, appeared in the Cashbox magazine best-selling record charts in 1954, reaching no. 40 on May 22, 1954.

== Movie and TV appearances ==
The song has appeared in the movie Playing by Heart (1998) in a recording by Chet Baker and in My Sex Life ... or How I Got Into an Argument (1996) in a recording by Ella Fitzgerald.

Meredith MacRae sings the song in Petticoat Junction Season Seven, episode 15 in 1970. The song also features in Season One, Episode 24 of The Cosby Show in 1985, performed by Lena Horne. Lena Horne also performed the song on The Muppet Show in the first season in 1976. The song also appeared on The Today Show in 1995, The Jack Benny Show in 1964, and The Frank Sinatra Show in 1957, and on an episode of The Millionaire in 1955.

In the 1984 film No Small Affair, Chrissy Faith (providing the singing voice for Demi Moore) sings the song in a wedding reception scene, singing an arrangement by the film's composer, Rupert Holmes. It can be viewed on YouTube.
