= It's the Dreamer in Me =

1938 song written by Jimmy Dorsey and Jimmy Van Heusen

Sheet music cover, Leo Feist, New York, 1938.

1938 Decca 78 single, 1733B.

"It's the Dreamer in Me" is a 1938 song composed by Jimmy Dorsey and Jimmy Van Heusen, which was first recorded by Jimmy Dorsey and His Orchestra with Bob Eberly on vocals. Jimmy Dorsey composed the music. The lyrics were written by Jimmy Van Heusen. The song is a jazz and pop standard.

Jimmy Dorsey and His Orchestra released the song as a Decca 78, 1733B, Matrix # 63433, in 1938. The song was also featured in the 1938 Warner Bros. movie short Jimmy Dorsey and His Orchestra directed by Lloyd French and released on October 22, 1938.

== Other recordings ==
The song has been recorded by Duke Ellington with Ivie Anderson the vocalist, Benny Goodman with singer Martha Tilton, Sammy Kaye, Abe Lyman, Paul Whiteman, Bing Crosby (recorded May 23, 1938), Harry James with Helen Humes, John Sheridan and His Dream Band with Rebecca Kilgore on vocals, and Scot Albertson. "Chick" MacGregor and his Royal Highlanders released an instrumental version as a 78 transcription disc in Hollywood, California as No. 1471.

The Harry James recording of "It's the Dreamer in Me" reached no. 9 in 1938 on Billboard, staying on the charts for 3 weeks.

== Sources ==
- Stockdale, Robert L. Jimmy Dorsey: A Study in Contrasts. (Studies in Jazz Series). Lanham, MD: The Scarecrow Press, Inc., 1999.
- Arnold, Jay, ed. Jimmy Dorsey Saxophone Method: A School of Rhythmic Saxophone Playing. Warner Bros Pubns, 1999.
- Sanford, Herb. Tommy and Jimmy: The Dorsey Years. (Introduction by Bing Crosby). DaCapo Press, 1980.
- Bockemuehl, Eugene. On the Road with the Jimmy Dorsey Aggravation, 1947–1949. Gray Castle Press, 1996.
- Metronome Magazine, March, 1942: Jimmy Dorsey cover. Metronome Editors. Vol. LVIII, No. 3.
- Down Beat Magazine, October 21, 1946: Jimmy Dorsey and Paul Whiteman cover.
