= Nilo Menéndez =

Nilo Menéndez Barnet (26 September 1902 – 15 September 1987) was a Cuban-born naturalized American songwriter. Born in Matanzas in 1902, Menéndez came to the United States in 1924 when he was 22. He wrote his best known song "Aquellos Ojos Verdes" in 1929 and was recorded several times by Latin artists and translated into English in 1931. The song became a major hit when Jimmy Dorsey recorded it as "Green Eyes" around 1941.

Menéndez died in Burbank, California in 1987.
