= Lorenzo Barcelata =

Mexican songwriter and musician

- Born: July 24, 1898; Tlalixcoyan, Veracruz
- Died: July 13, 1943 (aged 44); Mexico City
- Occupations: Composer, actor

Lorenzo Barcelata (July 24, 1898 – July 13, 1943) was a Mexican composer and actor born in Tlalixcoyan, Veracruz. He died in Mexico City from cholera, shortly before his 45th birthday.

== Biography ==
Barcelata came from a musically oriented family. He wrote his first song, "Arroyito", at the age of 14. He later moved to Tampico where he formed the Cuarteto Tamaulipeco with composer Ernesto Cortázar. Their fame quickly spread throughout the region and they received international fame when the Mexican government sent them on a tour of Cuba. While there, they were signed to perform a 52-week tour of the United States. After two of the members were fatally injured in an automobile accident, Barcelata returned to Mexico. He reformed the quartet as his fame continued to grow. Beginning in 1932, he entered the Mexican film industry and became a prominent film composer until his death. He also achieved fame as an actor as he played roles in several films.

== Music career ==
His most famous song is "María Elena", (also known as "Yours is My Heart"), and was originally written for Lucia Martínez García. The song was written at the request of Ernesto Soto Reyes, Lucía's husband, who paid $10,000 pesos for the song. Shortly before registering the song, Barcelata showed it to his businessman friend Anacarsis "Carcho" Peralta, who loved it; curiously, the song appeared shortly afterwards as "María Elena", the name of one of the businessman's girlfriends. "Maria Elena" was featured in the 1936 Mexican film of the same name. A version of it was also included on the soundtrack to the 1935 American film Bordertown. It was later translated into English and performed by the Lawrence Welk orchestra. Another English version was recorded by Jimmy Dorsey. Dorsey's version topped the charts in 1941. Wayne King also recorded an English version which reached the No. 2 position during the week of June 14, runner-up only to the Dorsey version. A vocal version by Tony Pastor also reached the Top 10 during that month. "Maria Elena" has since been recorded internationally by several different musicians. In 1958, the Brazilian group Los Indios Tabajaras recorded a version that became popular throughout Latin America and later (in 1963) reached the No. 6 position in the US charts & No. 5 in the UK charts.

The popularity of "Maria Elena" in the US in the early-1940s resulted in Barcelata touring the country once again. He returned to Mexico in 1943 where he was scheduled to produce several radio programs. However, he died on July 13, before recording could begin. In total, he left behind a catalog of 214 songs, including "Por ti aprendí a querer", and "El Cascabel", among others.

A recording of "El Cascabel" was one of the pieces of music on the Voyager Golden Record. This version was a mariachi interpretation performed by Antonio Maciel y Las Aguilillas with El Mariachi México de Pepe Villa. The 12 inch album (complete with stylus, cartridge and instructions for use) was launched into deep space aboard the Voyager space probes in the late 1970s.
