= Los Indios Tabajaras =

Brazilian guitar duo

Los Indios Tabajaras (The Tabajara Indians) was a guitar duo of two brothers, Antenor Lima and Natalicio (Nato) Lima, from Tianguá, Ceará in the Northeast of Brazil. The group name refers to the Tabajara, indigenous people who lived on the easternmost portion of the Atlantic coast of northeast Brazil in the period before and during Portuguese colonization, in the 16th century.

== Origins ==
Their beginnings are not clear, though most stories have them becoming accomplished guitar players after finding a guitar near Ceará, in spite of the improbability of the story. They found success in Rio de Janeiro, performing as Natalicio and Antenor Lima and dressing in ceremonial Indian costumes. Using classical guitars and playing transcriptions of classical violin and piano works, they were soon playing all over South America.

Probably as early as 1943, RCA's Latin American arm signed them to a recording contract. In the early 1950s, they took a break from performing and went back to study the guitar. After returning to the stage later that same decade, they took on the name "Los Indios Tabajaras" and released an album in the United States on Vox.

== Breakthrough ==
Throughout this period, they had a steady stream of releases on RCA in Mexico and one of these, a Mexican popular tune named "María Elena" (Lorenzo Barcelata; named after the wife of a Mexican president and recorded in 1958), became a steady seller, a success throughout Latin America and was finally released on a single in the U.S. in 1963. It spent 14 weeks on the Hot 100 in the fall of 1963, four of which were in the top 10 in November 1963, reaching number 6, number 4 in Canada, and had similar success in the United Kingdom. It sold over one million copies, and was awarded a gold disc.

Los Indios Tabajaras continued touring throughout the Americas and Europe, and in 1964 they had another two releases, "Always in My Heart" and "Marta." Although "Always in My Heart" made the Billboard Hot 100, neither of these were nearly as successful as "Maria Elena."

Their fluent guitar playing caught the ear of American guitarist Chet Atkins and, along with pianist Floyd Cramer, they recorded an instrumental album in Nashville, Tennessee. They also recorded and released material with singer Don Gibson, including a re-recording of Gibson's 1958 hit "Oh Lonesome Me".

== Later years ==
RCA released albums by Los Indios Tabajaras into the 1980s. They were produced by Herman Diaz Jr. until his retirement in 1975. They then worked with RCA producer Ethel Gabriel.

Antenor retired from performing in 1979, and died in 1997. Natalicio continued to perform into the 1990s with his wife, Michiko. He died in November 2009.

== Discography ==
- 1953 Temura
- 1957 Popular and Folk Songs of Latin America
- 1958 Sweet and Savage
- 1963 Maria Elena
- 1963 Los Indios Tàba-Jàràs
- 1964 Always In My Heart
- 1964 The Mellow Guitar Moods of Los Indios Tabajaras
- 1965 Voglio Amarti Cosi
- 1965 The Many Splendored Guitars of Los Indios Tabajaras
- 1965 Twin Guitars - In A Mood For Lovers
- 1966 Musica Para Enamorados
- 1966 Don Gibson with Spanish Guitars (with Don Gibson)
- 1966 Casually Classic
- 1967 The Very Special Touch
- 1967 The Soft Touch of Los Indios Tabajaras
- 1968 The Fascinating Rhythms of Their Brazil
- 1968 In A Sentimental Mood
- 1969 Canciones De Las Islas (Song of the Islands)
- 1970 Dreams of Love
- 1970 Canciones Populaires y Folklóricas de Hispanoamerica (re-issue of 1957 album)
- 1970 Los Indios Tabajaras
- 1971 Lo Que El Mundo Necesita Ahora es Amor
- 1971 Suono d'Estate
- 1971 Marta
- 1971 The Very Thought of You
- 1972 Siempre En Mi Corazon
- 1972 Softly, As In A Morning Sunrise
- 1972 El Condor Pasa
- 1973 Play Favorite Movie Themes
- 1974 The Classical Guitars of
- 1975 Temas de Peliculas Europeas
- 1975 Country Music Cavalcade (shared with Chet Atkins and Floyd Cramer)
- 1976 Secret Love/All Time Film Favorites
- 1977 Mellow Nostalgia
- 1977 El Sonido de Los Indios Tabajaras
- 1978 Masterpieces
- 1979 Two Guitars
- 1980 Rainbows
- 1981 Beautiful Sounds
- 1982 Music For Romance
- 1983 Guitars on the Go
- 1988 The Magic Guitars of Los Indios Tabajaras
- 1992 The Joy of Playing
