= So Many Times =

1939 song by Jimmy Dorsey and Don De Vito

1939 sheet music, Bregman, Vocco, and Conn, New York.

So Many Times is a 1939 song written by Jimmy Dorsey and Don De Vito. The song was released as a single in 1939 by Jimmy Dorsey and His Orchestra, becoming a Top 20 hit.

Jimmy Dorsey released the song as a Decca 78 single, 2727A, matrix number 66083, which reached no. 20 in 1939 on Billboard, staying on the charts for one week. The song was published by Bregman, Vocco, and Conn, Inc.

== Other recordings ==
The song was also recorded by Glenn Miller and his Orchestra in 1939 and released as an RCA Bluebird 78 single, 10438B, matrix number 042730. Jack Teagarden and his Orchestra recorded the song and released it as a Columbia single, 35252, matrix number 26163-A. Tommy Dorsey and His Orchestra also recorded the song and released it as a single on Victor, 26386, matrix number 042736.

== Sources ==
- Stockdale, Robert L. Jimmy Dorsey: A Study in Contrasts. (Studies in Jazz Series). Lanham, MD: The Scarecrow Press, Inc., 1999.
- Arnold, Jay, ed. Jimmy Dorsey Saxophone Method: A School of Rhythmic Saxophone Playing. Warner Bros Pubns, 1999.
- Sanford, Herb. Tommy and Jimmy: The Dorsey Years. (Introduction by Bing Crosby). DaCapo Press, 1980.
- Bockemuehl, Eugene. On the Road with the Jimmy Dorsey Aggravation, 1947-1949. Gray Castle Press, 1996.
