= My Sister and I (song) =

Single by Jimmy Dorsey and His Orchestra (vocals Bob Eberly)
- Released: April 1941
- Recorded: March 19, 1941
- Label: Decca 3710
- Songwriters: Hy Zaret, Joan Whitney and Alex Kramer

Jimmy Dorsey and His Orchestra (vocals Bob Eberly) singles chronology
"María Elena / Green Eyes" (1941)	"My Sister and I" (1941)	"Blue Champagne" (1941)

"My Sister and I" is a 1941 song written by Hy Zaret, Joan Whitney and Alex Kramer, recorded by Jimmy Dorsey, with vocals by Bob Eberly.

== Background ==
The Jimmy Dorsey release on Decca Records hit number one on the Billboard charts on June 7, 1941.

Sheet music of the time shows a boy and girl in Dutch clothing, with windmills in the background. Under the title appears the description "As inspired by the Current Best Seller 'My Sister and I' by Dirk van der Heide." The lyric is in the voice of a child who has—with a sister—left a war zone by boat and begun a new life abroad. The line "the fear/That came from a troubled sky" along with the song's release date implies the evacuation of children from the countries ravaged by World War II, such as the London Blitz the previous winter.

== Other recordings ==
Other chart hits in 1941 were by Bea Wain, Bob Chester (vocal by Bill Darnell) and by Benny Goodman (vocal by Helen Forrest).

== Sources ==
- Stockdale, Robert L. Jimmy Dorsey: A Study in Contrasts. (Studies in Jazz Series). Lanham, MD: The Scarecrow Press, Inc., 1999.
