= My Sister and I: The Diary of a Dutch Boy Refugee =

1941 book

- First edition
- Translator: Antoon Deventer
- Language: English
- Genre: Memoir
- Publisher: Harcourt, Brace
- Publication date: January 1941
- Publication place: United States

My Sister and I: The Diary of a Dutch Boy Refugee was first published in January 1941 in New York by Harcourt, Brace. It is the alleged diary of a 12-year-old Dutch boy, named Dirk van der Heide, who survives the bombing of Rotterdam, Holland and escapes aboard a ship with his younger sister. They stop in England on their way to America. This book was used for pro-British propaganda.

== Plot ==
This book follows the alleged diary of a 12-year-old boy named Dirk van der Heide as he recalled his memory of the bombing in Rotterdam, Holland in May 1940. The story starts off with Dirk talking to the readers about why he is writing his diary. He says “I don’t like to think about the war, but the Captain says people ought to know what it’s really like so that they won’t let it happen any more”. He claims not to remember everything that happened when the Nazis came but he is going to try to recall the events.

Dirk is traveling with his sister Keetje to America, escaping the war. They are leaving Holland because their father is fighting in the war and their mother was killed in a bombing. He continues on to describe what happened when he first heard about the German invasion. He remembers waking up in the night hearing explosions and people shouting under his window. He remembers how chaotic things were before and after the bombings. He then talks about his positive experiences with the British.

== About the book ==
The book was translated into English from Dutch by Mrs. Antoon Deventer before its first publication in New York by Harcourt, Brace in January 1941. In June, the book was republished in London by Faber and Faber. The original printing included 7,500 copies and the second printing produced 17,500 copies. My Sister and I sold over 46,000 copies within one year of being released. By the time it went out of print in July 1948, 52,000 copies had been sold.

The real author is unknown; but there are several theories. There are some who believe Dirk van der Heide actually wrote the diary pages. Other people believe that the book is a fraud and is really authored by Hendrik Willem van Loon. Paul Fussell argues that Stanley Preston Young, a young writer in the 1930s who worked at Harcourt, Brace, wrote the story.

Tin Pan Alley published a song inspired by the book entitled "My Sister and I".

== Book reviews ==
Upon its release, the book was thought to be authentic. Paul Fussell said “Dirk’s narrative was so welcome that the book was generally credited with being what it seemed to be”. Fussell discusses this in his essay "Writing in Wartime: The Uses of Innocence," published in "Thank God for the Atom Bomb and Other Essays" (1988). In 1941, Christian Century stated it was “an authentic document which brings the experience of European refugee children vividly before the mind of the American reader”.

My Sister and I was praised in book reviews. Olga Owens from Boston Transcript said “it is the most moving document that has yet come out of the war”. A. M. Jordan with the Horn Book Index said “the book is not merely touching. It is important for bringing home to our young people significant facts about the fruits of the two conflicting ideas dominant in the world today”.

== Uses as propaganda ==
Americans did not trust information coming from England. In order for the pro-allies messages to be successfully received, the propaganda would have to come from another source. Americans trusted the innocence of a young Dutch boy and did not recognize that Dirk’s story was written in efforts to make the British seem full of “kindness, sympathy, and cheerfulness”. Dirk story is believed because he is simply observing what he sees; he is not writing for the sole purpose of demonizing the Germans, although his “observations” do seem suspiciously critical of the Germans while being pro-British.

To protect against critics who might question the legitimacy of this work coming from a twelve-year-old boy, the statement that “sometimes his writing seems abnormally mature….[but] he has no awareness of [his] unusual ability and doesn’t seem to have any instinct for showing off” is given in the introduction.
