= Blue Champagne (song) =

1941 song performed by Jimmy Dorsey

Single by Jimmy Dorsey and His Orchestra with Bob Eberly
- B-side: "All Alone and Lonely"
- Released: June 1941
- Recorded: April 29, 1941
- Studio: Decca Studios, New York City
- Label: Decca 3775
- Songwriters: Grady Watts; Jimmy Eaton; Frank L. Ryerson

Jimmy Dorsey and His Orchestra singles chronology
"My Sister and I" (1941)	"Blue Champagne"	"Jim" (1941)

"Blue Champagne" is a song written by Grady Watts, Jimmy Eaton and Frank L. Ryerson and recorded and first released by American bandleader Jimmy Dorsey in 1941, featuring vocals by singer Bob Eberly.

== Background ==
It was first released by Jimmy Dorsey on Decca Records in 1941, backed with "All Alone and Lonely". It topped The Billboard's National Best Selling Retail Records chart on the week of September 27, 1941, becoming Dorsey's fifth number-one single of that year.

== Other recordings ==
Other recordings included those by Xavier Cugat, Ray Eberle, Freddy Martin, Anita O'Day, and Tex Beneke. Glenn Miller also performed the song with his orchestra and released a version on V-Disc as 144B with the Army Air Force Training Command Orchestra.

== Sources ==
- Stockdale, Robert L. Jimmy Dorsey: A Study in Contrasts. (Studies in Jazz Series). Lanham, MD: The Scarecrow Press, Inc., 1999.
