= Green Eyes (Aquellos Ojos Verdes) =

Song by Jimmy Dorsey and His Orchestra vocals by Helen O'Connell and Bob Eberly
- Language: Spanish, English
- English title: Green Eyes
- A-side: "María Elena"
- Written: 1929
- Released: April 1941
- Recorded: March 19, 1941
- Label: Decca 3698
- Songwriters: Adolfo Utrera, Nilo Menéndez
- Lyricists: 1931 English lyrics: Eddie Rivera, Eddie Woods

Jimmy Dorsey and His Orchestra vocals by Helen O'Connell and Bob Eberly singles chronology
"Yours" (1941)	"Green Eyes (Aquellos Ojos Verdes)" (1941)	"My Sister and I" (1941)

"Green Eyes" is a popular song, originally written in Spanish under the title "Aquellos Ojos Verdes" ("Those Green Eyes") by Nilo Menéndez in 1929, with lyrics by Adolfo Utrera. The English translation was made by Eddie Rivera and Eddie Woods in 1931.

== Spanish version ==
The song, a bolero, was written in 1929 and recorded in Cuba the same year. It was the only major hit, both originally in Cuba and then again in the Latin community in New York, for Cuban pianist Nilo Menéndez. The lyrics were supplied by Cuban tenor Adolfo Utrera.

== English version ==
The English version of the song was written in 1931 but did not become a major hit until it was recorded by the Jimmy Dorsey orchestra around ten years later. The recording was made on March 19, 1941 with vocals by Helen O'Connell and Bob Eberly and released by Decca Records as catalog number 3698 with "Maria Elena" on the flip side. The record first reached the Billboard charts on May 9, 1941 and lasted 21 weeks on the chart, peaking at #1. Since "Maria Elena" was also a #1 hit, this was a major double-sided hit recording.

== Other recordings ==
- English lyrics (translation)
  - The Ravens had regional success with a 1955 revival.
  - The Shadows performed an instrumental version of this song on their 1967 album Jigsaw.
- Spanish lyrics (original)
  - Gloria Jean sang "Aquellos Ojos Verdes" in the 1943 film When Johnny Comes Marching Home.
  - Ibrahim Ferrer sang it on the 1999 album Buena Vista Social Club Presents Ibrahim Ferrer.
  - Ben Affleck sang it in the 2006 film Hollywoodland, in pivotal scenes just prior to the fatal shooting of his character, George Reeves.

== Parodies ==
- Allan Sherman recorded a version of the song titled "Green Stamps", a parody of S&H Green Stamps. During the recording session (according to the liner notes on the album), Sherman had a talk with the college types who hadn't heard of "Green Eyes." He said it was, like the Bossa Nova, once a red-hot tune by Helen O'Connell. He asked, "Any of you remember red-hot Helen O'Connell?" (About half did.)

== Recorded versions ==
- 101 Strings Orchestra
- All-Star Orchestra
- Ray Anthony Orchestra
- Orquesta Aragón
- Desi Arnaz
- Stanley Black
- Boston Pops Orchestra
- Les Brown
- Buena Vista Social Club
- John Bunch
- Frank Chacksfield and his orchestra
- Nat King Cole
- Ray Conniff
- Bing Crosby
- Xavier Cugat
- Bola de Nieve
- Lou Donaldson
- The Dorsey Brothers
- Jimmy Dorsey orchestra (1941)
- Bob Eberly
- Roy Eldridge
- Les & Larry Elgart
- Cass Elliot (on The Julie Andrews Hour, 1973)
- George Evans
- Ibrahim Ferrer
- Bob Florence Big Band
- Connie Francis
- Jane Froman
- Earl Grant
- Bennie Green
- Gene Krupa
- La Gusana Ciega
- Abbe Lane
- Steve Lawrence
- Enoch Light
- Enric Madriguera
- Barry Manilow with Rosemary Clooney
- Glenn Miller
- Helen O'Connell
- Anita O'Day
- Lisa Ono
- Norrie Paramor, with Patricia Clark (soprano)
- Guadalupe Pineda
- Pony Poindexter
- Baden Powell
- The Ravens
- Edmundo Ros
- Harry Roy
- Charlie Shavers
- Trio Los Panchos
- Conway Twitty
- Bebo Valdes and his orchestra
- The Ventures

== See also ==
- List of number-one singles of 1941 (U.S.)
