= Helen O'Connell =

American actress and singer (1920–1993)

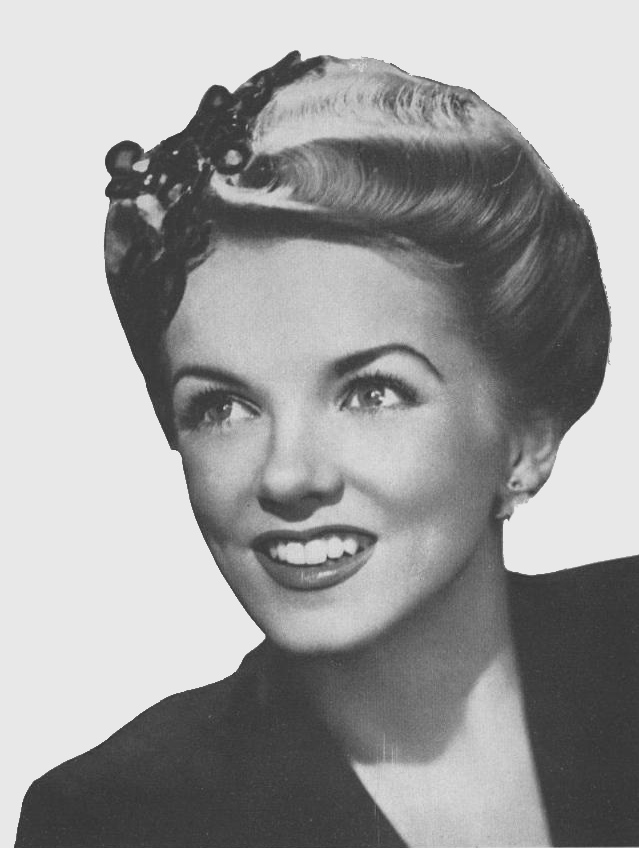
- O'Connell, c. 1943

Background information
- Born: May 23, 1920; Lima, Ohio, U.S.
- Died: September 9, 1993 (aged 73) San Diego, California, U.S.
- Genres: Traditional pop, popular music, jazz, vocal
- Occupations: Singer, actress, hostess
- Instrument: Vocals
- Years active: 1935–1943, 1951–1980
- Labels: Decca Records, Kapp, Vik, RCA Victor
- Spouse(s): Clifford Smith, Jr (m. 1941–1951) Tom T. Chamales (m. 1957; died 1960) Frank De Vol (m. 1991–1993)

Helen O'Connell (May 23, 1920 – September 9, 1993) was an American singer, actress, and hostess, described as "the quintessential big-band singer of the 1940s".

== Early life ==
Born in Lima, Ohio, O'Connell grew up in Toledo, Ohio. By the time she was 15, her older sister, Alice, and she were singing duets in clubs and hotels and on radio stations in Toledo.

== Career ==
O'Connell launched her career as a big-band singer with Larry Funk and his Band of a Thousand Melodies. She was singing with Funk's band in Greenwich Village when Jimmy Dorsey's manager discovered her.

O'Connell joined the Dorsey band in 1939 and achieved her best-selling records in the early 1940s with "Green Eyes", "Amapola", "Tangerine" and "Yours". In each of these Latin-influenced numbers, Bob Eberly crooned the song, which Helen then reprised in an up-tempo arrangement. O'Connell was selected by DownBeat readers as best female singer in 1940 and 1941 and won the 1940 Metronome magazine poll for best female vocalist. In a 1993 obituary article, the Associated Press described O'Connell as "the darling of GIs during World War II".

O'Connell retired from show business upon her first marriage in 1943. When her marriage ended in 1951, she resumed her career, achieving some chart success and making regular appearances on radio and television. O'Connell sang duets with Bing Crosby, Johnny Mercer, and Dean Martin. In 1953, O'Connell and Bob Eberly headlined TV's Top Tunes, a summer replacement program for Perry Como's CBS television show. The program also featured Ray Anthony and his orchestra. In March 1955, O'Connell visited Australia as a support act on the landmark tour headlined by singer Johnnie Ray, which set a new box-office record for Australia that stood until the 1964 visit by the Beatles (and during which local media also reported that O'Connell was romantically linked with Ray). O'Connell also was the featured singer on The Russ Morgan Show on CBS TV in 1956. In 1957, she had her own 15-minute program, The Helen O'Connell Show, twice a week on NBC.

O'Connell was one of the first "girls" on NBC's The Today Show, commenting at the time: "I wasn't hired as a singer, I was hired as a talker, a pleasant switch." She had that role from 1956 to 1958.

In 1961, she co-hosted the Desilu-NBC program Here's Hollywood, conducting interviews with celebrities, often in their own homes. O'Connell co-hosted the Miss USA and Miss Universe pageants with Bob Barker from 1972 to 1980 and was nominated for an Emmy Award in 1976 for her coverage of the Miss Universe pageant. . She also sang the National Anthem for Super Bowl XV in 1981. O'Connell's 1942 recording of "Brazil" with the Jimmy Dorsey Orchestra was a 2009 addition to the Grammy Hall of Fame.

In 1977, O'Connell was invited to join the "4 Girls 4" act with Rosemary Clooney, Margaret Whiting, and Rose Marie. The format was that each member performed solo for 30 minutes and finally they all joined up together to sing as a group for about 10 minutes. The act was very successful for several years and toured all over the USA. Whiting and Rose Marie left the group and were replaced by Martha Raye and Kay Starr, with the show being renamed the New 4 Girls. The group finally disbanded in 1989.

In 1992, O'Connell was featured along with the Andrews Sisters and Kay Starr in the KCET special Those Fabulous 40s. Her final performance was at the Valley Forge Music Festival in Valley Forge, Pennsylvania, on August 14, 1993.

== Hit Records ==
With Jimmy Dorsey and His Orchestra

1939 Especially for You #10
1940 Little Curly Hair in a High Chair #10
1940 Six Lessons with Madame La Zonga #4
1940 The Bad Humor Man #23
1941 You’ve Got Me This Way #19
1941 Amapola (with Bob Eberly) #1
1941 Green Eyes (with Bob Eberly) #1
1941 Yours (with Bob Eberly) #2
1941 Embraceable You #23
1941 Time Was (with Bob Eberly) #10
1941 Jim (with Bob Eberly) #2
1942 I Said No! (with Bob Eberly) #10
1942 Arthur Murray Taught Me Dancing in a Hurry #18
1942 Not Mine #22
1942 Tangerine (with Bob Eberly) #1
1942 If You Build a Better Mousetrap (with Bob Eberly) #23
1942 I Threw a Kiss in the Ocean #12
1942 Wonder When My Baby’s Coming Home #22
1942 Take Me #7
1942 Brazil (with Bob Eberly) #14

Solo career with Capitol Records

1951 Would I Love You (Love You, Love You) #16
1951 Slow Poke #8
1952 Be Anything (But Be Mine) #27
1952 Winter Can’t Quench the Fire of Love (with Gisele Mackenzie) #21
1953 Lipstick-A-Powder-'N-Paint (with Gisele Mackenzie) #20

== Albums ==
- 1957 - Green Eyes (Vik)
- 1961 - Recapturing the Excitement of the Jimmy Dorsey Era (with Bob Eberly)
- 1962 - Here's Helen (RCA Camden)
- 1963 - An Era Reborn with Helen O'Connell
- 1970 - The Inimitable Helen O'Connell in a Beautiful Friendship
- 1971 - Helen O'
- 1972 - This is Helen O'Connell (RCA Victor)
- 1975 - Christmas with Helen O'Connell

== Personal life and death ==
O'Connell was married to wealthy playboy Clifford Smith, Jr., from 1941 to 1951, and novelist Tom T. Chamales from 1957 to 1960, and had four daughters.

On August 8, 1965, the Los Angeles Police Department found O'Connell unconscious in her car. United Press International reported: "Police said they found 12 capsule sleeping pills in the car." She was transported to Hollywood Receiving Hospital, where her stomach was pumped.

Her third and final marriage was in 1991, to arranger-conductor-composer Frank De Vol.

She died of cancer on September 9, 1993, in San Diego, California. Her funeral was held at St. Paul's Catholic Church in Westwood, California, where she was a member.
