= Frank L. Ryerson =

Frank Layton Ryerson (3 July 1905 in Paterson, New Jersey – 15 May 1995 in Clearwater, Florida) was an American trumpeter, composer, arranger and educator.

== Professional Musician ==
Ryerson was raised in Paterson, NJ and got his start as a professional trumpet player at the Meadowbrook in nearby Cedar Grove. As a trumpeter and arranger, Ryerson performed and recorded with several big bands, beginning in 1927, including Mal Hallett and His Orchestra (also as an arranger; 1936), Glen Gray and His Casa Loma Orchestra (1939-1942), Jack Teagarden (1939), Jimmy Dorsey, and Vaughn Monroe and His Orchestra (1944). Between 1939 and 1942 his trumpet playing appeared on 137 band recordings.

Ryerson co-wrote the Jimmy Dorsey hit "Blue Champagne" written in 1941 and covered by The Manhattan Transfer in their 1975 album titled The Manhattan Transfer. He wrote the stirring "Lament in D Minor." By 1949 he was the orchestral arranger for Vaughn Monroe.

== Educator ==
For the remaining half of his career Ryerson was an educator. Beginning in 1951 he built and ran the instrumental music program for the Paramus Public Schools. He graduated from the Manhattan School of Music and in 1957 became the music director at the new Paramus High School where he created the student concert band, marching band, big-band style dance (stage) band, and later a brass choir. He arranged many of the charts himself and introduced innovative techniques to the marching band not common at the time. The organizations were known for their high quality and enthusiasm from the beginning. He wrote the alma mater lyrics (sung to the tune "Aura Lee", popularly known at the time in the form of Elvis Presley's "Love Me Tender")

He also led and played trumpet in a local small professional dance/jazz combo, and provided private trumpet lessons at his home in the adjacent town of Fair Lawn, New Jersey, to students from the surrounding area.

After 25 years in the school system, in 1976 Ryerson retired and moved to Clearwater, Florida. He died nineteen years later on May 15, 1995 at the age of 89.
