= Tangerine (1941 song) =

1941 song by Victor Schertzinger and Johnny Mercer

Single by Jimmy Dorsey and His Orchestra vocals by Helen O'Connell and Bob Eberly
- Released: January 1942
- Recorded: December 10, 1941
- Label: Decca 4123
- Composer: Victor Schertzinger
- Lyricist: Johnny Mercer

Jimmy Dorsey and His Orchestra vocals by Helen O'Connell and Bob Eberly singles chronology
"Jim" (1941)	"Tangerine" (1942)

"Tangerine" is a popular song. The music was written by Victor Schertzinger, the lyrics by Johnny Mercer. The song was published in 1941 and soon became a jazz standard.

== Background ==
"Tangerine" was introduced to a broad audience in the 1942 movie The Fleet's In, produced by Paramount Pictures, directed by Schertzinger just before his death, and starring Dorothy Lamour, William Holden, Eddie Bracken, singer Cass Daley, and Betty Hutton in her feature film debut.

The song portrays a South American woman with universally recognized allure: "When she dances by, / Señoritas stare / And caballeros sigh." As one of Mercer's biographers explained the initial popularity: "Latin America, the one part of the world not engulfed in World War II, became a favorite topic for songs and films for Americans who wanted momentarily to forget about the conflagration."

== Charted recordings ==
"Tangerine"

Single by Salsoul Orchestra

from the album The Salsoul Orchestra
- B-side: "Salsoul Hustle"
- Released: December 1975
- Recorded: 1975
- Studio: Sigma Sound, Philadelphia, Pennsylvania
- Genre: Disco
- Length: 2:57 (single version); 4:46 (album version)
- Label: Salsoul
- Songwriters: Victor Schertzinger, Johnny Mercer
- Producer: Vincent Montana Jr.

Salsoul Orchestra singles chronology
"Salsoul Hustle" (1975)	"Tangerine" (1975)	"You're Just the Right Size" (1976)

The most popular recorded version of the song was made by the performers who introduced it in the film: the Jimmy Dorsey Orchestra with vocalists Helen O'Connell and Bob Eberly. The recording was released in January 1942 by Decca Records as catalog number 4123. The record first reached the Billboard charts on April 10, 1942, and it lasted 15 weeks on the chart, including six weeks at #1. The lyrics in this version differ slightly from those in the movie. On the record, Eberly sings "And I've seen toasts to Tangerine / Raised in every bar across the Argentine," the lyric that became standard. In the movie at that point, the line is "And I've seen times when Tangerine / Had the bourgeoisie believing she were queen." Vaughn Monroe and his Orchestra released another popular recording on RCA's Bluebird label that reached #11 in 1942. A disco instrumental version by the Salsoul Orchestra brought the song back into the U.S. top 20 in 1976. It also reached #11 on the US, Easy Listening chart.

=== Chart performance ===
==== The Salsoul Orchestra ====
Chart (1976)	Peak position
U.S. Billboard Easy Listening	11
U.S. Billboard Dance/Disco	6
US Billboard Hot 100	18
US Hot Soul Singles (Billboard)	36

== Other notable covers ==
More than 100 acts have recorded "Tangerine", including such notable artists as: Jimmy Dorsey, Johnny Mercer, Oscar Peterson, Tony Bennett, Dean Martin, Dave Brubeck, Herb Alpert, Chet Baker and Paul Desmond, Ben Webster and Coleman Hawkins, Jim Hall, Harry Connick Jr., and Benny Goodman.

== Popular culture ==
In addition:

- The tune was featured as background music in the films Double Indemnity (1944), Sorry, Wrong Number (1948), Friday the 13th: The Final Chapter (1984) and Star Trek III: The Search for Spock (1984).
- In 1976, All In the Family gave a nod to the song in the episode "Archie's Operation" when Archie Bunker burst into it repeatedly to interrupt son-in-law Mike's efforts to help pay for Archie's surgery.
- The Pet Milk company used the melody for a 1960s liquid diet product called Sego. The opening line "Tangerine, she is all they say" was replaced by "There she goes, she's a Sego girl."
- The tune later became the jingle for Pillsbury's Figurines, a diet aid, during the 1970s.
