= Grady Watts =

American jazz musician (1908–1986)

- Born: June 30, 1908; Texarkana, Texas, U.S.
- Died: January 1986 (aged 78) Vero Beach, Florida, U.S.
- Genre: Jazz
- Instruments: Trumpet

Grady Watts (June 30, 1908 – January 1986) was an American jazz trumpeter and composer.

== Early life and education ==
Watts was born in Texarkana, Texas. He attended the Allen Academy and University of Oklahoma.

== Career ==
Watts played in local jazz bands in Louisiana in the late-1920s. In 1931 he joined the Casa Loma Orchestra, where he became a featured soloist and a composer; he recorded copiously with the ensemble and remained with it until 1942. Among his compositions for the Orchestra were "Rhythm Man", "You Ain't Been Livin' Right", "I Remember", and "Touch and Go". In the mid-1940s he abandoned his full-time career as a performer and took jobs in A&R and as an executive in the chemical engineering industry.

== Personal life ==
Watts was living in Vero Beach, Florida at the time of his death.
