= Jimmy Dorsey =

American jazz musician and band leader (1904–1957)

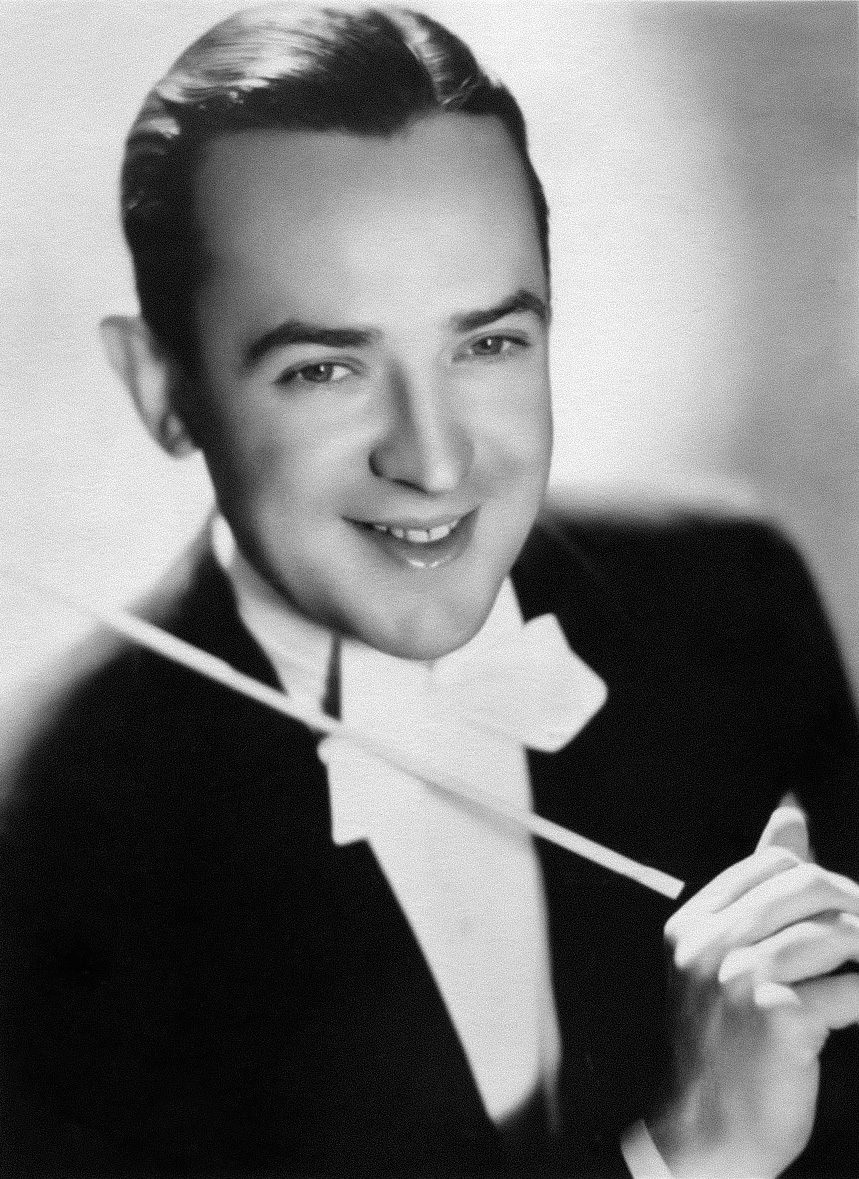
- Dorsey in 1943

Background information
- Born: James Francis Dorsey; February 29, 1904; Shenandoah, Pennsylvania, U.S.
- Died: June 12, 1957 (aged 53) New York City, U.S.
- Genres: Jazz; big band; swing; Dixieland
- Occupations: Bandleader; musician; composer
- Instruments: Saxophone; clarinet; trumpet
- Years active: 1913–1957
- Formerly of: Dorsey Brothers Orchestra; Jimmy Dorsey and His Orchestra

James Francis Dorsey (February 29, 1904 – June 12, 1957) was an American jazz clarinetist, saxophonist, composer, and big band leader. He recorded and composed the jazz and pop standards "I'm Glad There Is You (In This World of Ordinary People)" and "It's the Dreamer in Me". His other major recordings were "Tailspin", "John Silver", "So Many Times", "Amapola", "Brazil" ("Aquarela do Brasil"), "Pennies from Heaven" (with Bing Crosby, Louis Armstrong, and Frances Langford), "Grand Central Getaway", and "So Rare". He played clarinet on the seminal jazz standards "Singin' the Blues" in 1927 and the original 1930 recording of "Georgia on My Mind", which were inducted into the Grammy Hall of Fame.

== Early life ==
Jimmy Dorsey was born on Leap Day 1904 in Shenandoah, Pennsylvania, United States, the first son of Theresa Langton Dorsey and Thomas Francis Dorsey. His father, Thomas, was initially a coal miner, but would later become a music teacher and marching-band director. Both Jimmy and his younger brother, Tommy, were musically active during their childhoods, and by the age of seven, Jimmy was already playing with his father's band. He made his first public appearance at age nine while playing trumpet with J. Carson McGee's King Trumpeters in New York in 1913. He switched to alto saxophone in 1915 and then learned clarinet. Dorsey played an Albert system clarinet, as opposed to the more common Boehm system used by most of his contemporaries, including Benny Goodman and Artie Shaw.

With his brother Tommy on trombone, they formed Dorsey's Novelty Six, later called Dorsey's Wild Canaries, one of the first jazz bands to broadcast. In 1924, he joined the California Ramblers (based in New York City). He did much freelance radio and recording work throughout the 1920s. The brothers also appeared as session musicians on many jazz recordings. He joined Ted Lewis's band in 1930, with whom he toured Europe. The same year, he played clarinet on the iconic jazz standard "Georgia on My Mind" in 1930, with Hoagy Carmichael and His Orchestra, which featured Bix Beiderbecke on cornet. Dorsey married Jane Porter in 1928, and they had one daughter, Julia. Porter and Dorsey divorced in 1949.

== Career ==
During his early days as a musician, Jimmy Dorsey performed with various ensembles and artists, including the Scranton Sirens, the California Ramblers, Red Nichols, Jean Goldkette, Frankie Trumbauer, Ben Pollack, and Paul Whiteman. He played the clarinet solo on the iconic 1927 jazz standard "Singin' the Blues", with the Frankie Trumbauer Orchestra featuring Bix Beiderbecke (which would, a half-century later, be inducted into the Grammy Hall of Fame). After returning to the United States from his European tour, he worked briefly with Rudy Vallée and with several other bandleaders, and likewise with his brother Tommy—including starting their famed eponymous band. He appeared on at least seventy-five radio broadcasts, many of them with his brother. He was a member of Nat Shilkret's orchestra, on programs such as (starting in 1937) "The Music that Satisfies" (also known as the Chesterfield Quarter Hour). Glenn Miller arranged and played trombone on several early sessions that Dorsey and his brother made for OKeh Records, including "The Spell of the Blues", "Let's Do It", and "My Kinda Love"—all with Bing Crosby on vocals.

In 1927, the brothers created the Dorsey Brothers Orchestra and signed with OKeh Records. For some of their sessions, Glenn Miller would join them as trombonist, arranger, and composer, composing "Annie's Cousin Fannie", "Tomorrow's Another Day", "Harlem Chapel Chimes", and "Dese Dem Dose". Their first song to chart was "Coquette" with vocals from Bill Dutton in June, 1928. Their song, "Let's Do It (Let's Fall in Love)", with vocals by Bing Crosby, was their first to reach the top ten charts. Despite their success, the brothers frequently disagreed over management of the band and their conflict would come to a head in May 1935 when, after an onstage disagreement, Tommy stormed off. Afterward, Jimmy continued the band, keeping the Dorsey Brothers name in hopes his younger brother would return; in September 1935, the Dorsey Brothers band became "Jimmy Dorsey and His Orchestra", and he signed with Decca Records. In December, 1935 Dorsey's first song with the band, "You Let me Down", would reach the charts. For the next two years, Jimmy Dorsey and His Orchestra would provide accompaniment for Bing Crosby's Kraft Music Hall radio show. The band was featured on 73 programs, from December 1935 to July 1937; they also backed Crosby on his commercial recordings during this time. In 1936, Bing Crosby released the single "Pennies from Heaven" recorded with the Jimmy Dorsey Orchestra on Decca Records. The early band was considered more jazz-oriented than his brother's, and in response the band recorded instrumental swing classics: "Dorsey Stomp," "Tap Dancer's Nightmare," "Parade of the Milk Bottle Caps," "John Silver" and "Dusk in Upper Sandusky," and included musicians such as Bobby Byrne, Ray McKinley, Donald Matteson and Skeets Herfurt along with vocalists Bob Eberly and Kay Weber.

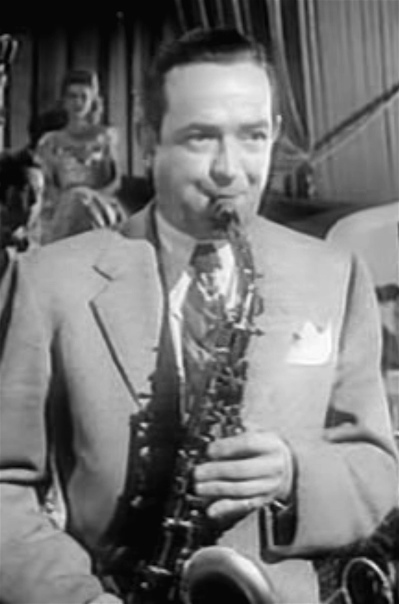
Jimmy Dorsey playing alto saxophone in The Fabulous Dorseys (1947)

Dorsey left Crosby in 1937, to concentrate on his own career, and he did well commercially, although he was overshadowed by Benny Goodman, whose big band had "grabbed center stage" in the mid-1930s. Dorsey's main vocalist was Bob Eberly, considered to be the best in the music business, and in 1939, Helen O'Connell joined the band, and the idea to have them perform duets proved to be highly successful. She and Bob Eberly possessed a "boy and girl next door" charm, and their pairing produced several of the band's biggest hits. Many of the Eberly-O'Connell recordings were arranged in an unusual 3-section "a-b-c" format. This format was reportedly developed at the insistence of a record producer (then called an A&R executive) who wanted to feature both singers and the full band in a single 3-minute 78 rpm recording. Eberly sang the first minute, usually as a slow romantic ballad, the next minute featured the full band backing Jimmy's saxophone, and the last minute was sung by O'Connell in a more up-tempo style, sometimes with lyrics in Spanish. Almost every record released during 1939–1943 were hits, but especially their Latin American stylized songs like "Amapola", "Maria Elena", and "Green Eyes", which topped the charts in 1941. They continued singing with his band for future records and motion picture appearances. Kitty Kallen sang with the Jimmy Dorsey orchestra following Helen O'Connell's departure in 1942. Jerry Lewis' first wife Patti Palmer (birth name Esther Calonico) was a singer with his orchestra for less than a year, starting about 1944. Despite personnel changes, Jimmy remained one of the top big band leaders after World War II and into the 1950s, always updating the sound of his band, but the big band business was beginning to decline. Dorsey employed pianist and arranger Joe Lipman in 1939 (who had just left Bunny Berigan); he contributed heavily to the repertoire of the band and success of the recordings through the next three years.

Jimmy and Tommy Dorsey reunited on March 15, 1945, to record a V-Disc at Liederkranz Hall in New York City. Released in June 1945, V-Disc 451 featured "More Than You Know" backed with "Brotherly Jump". The songs featured the combined orchestras of Jimmy and Tommy Dorsey. In 1947, Jimmy signed with MGM Records and in the same year, the brothers would put aside their tensions to film The Fabulous Dorseys. The film was a look inside the brothers' lives from practicing as children, to making it big as adults; the brothers played themselves in the film. It also highlighted their struggles leading the Dorsey Brothers Orchestra and showed what their lives were like on the road. Despite the brothers coming together for the movie, Jimmy continued to lead his own band until the early 1950s. In 1950, Jimmy moved to Columbia Records and his brother offered him a seat in the Tommy Dorsey Orchestra. In 1950 and 1951, he accompanied Thelma Gracen on a few recordings during her singing career.

In 1953, Tommy and Jimmy would rename the band, the "Dorsey Brothers Orchestra." Tommy was the leader of the group, and made Jimmy both the co-leader and featured soloist. On December 26, 1953, the brothers and their orchestra appeared on Jackie Gleason's CBS television program. The success of that television appearance led Gleason to produce a weekly variety program, Stage Show, hosted by the brothers on CBS from 1954 to 1956. The show gave other big band leaders hope in a business that was steadily declining for them. In January 1956, the Stage Show made history with the network television debut of Elvis Presley. Promoting his early recordings for RCA Victor, Presley made a total of six guest appearances. Competitive ratings from NBC's popular Perry Como Show forced Stage Show into early cancellation.

In 1956, after Tommy Dorsey died from choking in his sleep, Jimmy took over leadership of the orchestra. Around that same time, Jimmy was diagnosed with throat cancer. He died on June 12, 1957, at age 53 in New York City. Broadcasts of Jimmy Dorsey and The Fabulous Dorsey Orchestra on NBC Bandstand survive from December 24 to 28, 1956, and from December 31, 1956 to January 1, 1957. At least two other extant broadcasts from the month of December 1956 are available. Recordings of the band from their winter 1957 tour have not surfaced. These recordings would provide the last aural evidence of Jimmy Dorsey's work, which otherwise is the NBC Bandstand broadcast from January 1, 1957. It was once thought that Dorsey's last appearance was in Joplin, Missouri, on March 12, 1957; but, he did lead the band starting on March 19, 1957, at the Roseland Ballroom, for less than a week before traveling to Florida, as his health was failing rapidly.

At the time of his death, Jimmy's final hit song, "So Rare", reached the number-two spot on the Billboard charts, becoming the highest-charting song by a big band during the first decade of the rock-and-roll era. With an arrangement heavily influenced by R&B saxophonist Earl Bostic, it marked Dorsey's attempt to acknowledge rock music and marked a significant departure from his earlier work. This final recording sold 500,000 copies and earned him a gold record.

Jimmy Dorsey is considered one of the most important and influential alto saxophone players of the big band and swing eras. Jazz saxophonists Lester Young and Charlie Parker both acknowledge him as an important influence on their styles.

== Movie appearances and filmography ==
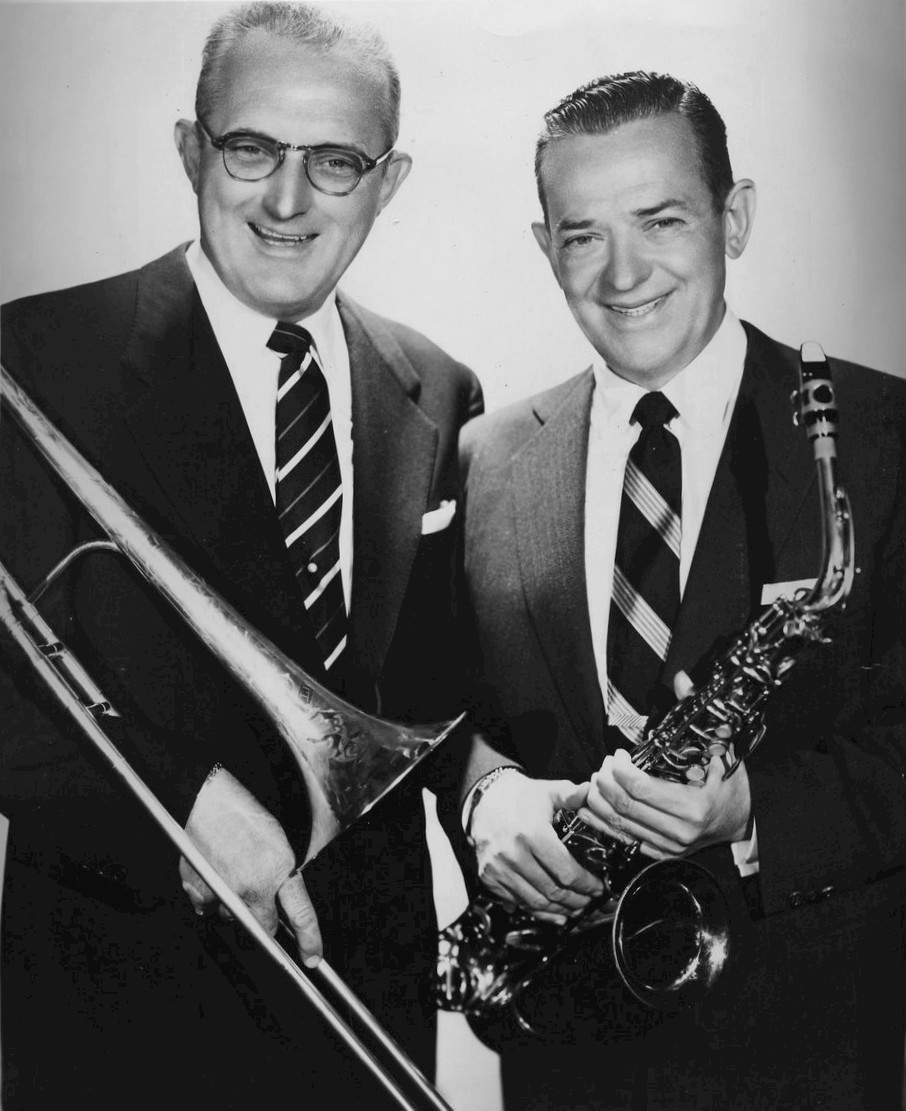
Jimmy (right) and Tommy Dorsey in 1955

Dorsey appeared in a number of Hollywood motion pictures, including That Girl from Paris, Shall We Dance, The Fleet's In, Lost in a Harem with Abbott and Costello, I Dood It, and the biopic with his brother Tommy, The Fabulous Dorseys, in 1947.

In 1938, Jimmy Dorsey and His Orchestra also appeared in a movie short performing many of his hits, including "It's the Dreamer in Me", "I Love You in Technicolor", and "Parade of the Milk Bottle Caps".

=== Films in which Dorsey appeared ===
- That Girl from Paris (1936)
- Shall We Dance (1937)
- Jimmy Dorsey and His Orchestra (1938 short)
- Birth of the Blues (1941)
- The Fleet's In (1942)
- I Dood It (1943)
- Four Jills in a Jeep (1944)
- Lost in a Harem (1944)
- Hollywood Canteen (1944)
- The Fabulous Dorseys (1947)
- Music Man (1948)
- Make Believe Ballroom (1949)

== Compositions ==
- "Dixieland Band from Santa Claus Land"
- "Mood Hollywood"
- "Shim Sham Shimmy"
- "So Many Times" – reached Billboard no. 20 in 1939, staying on the charts for one week; Glenn Miller and His Orchestra recorded the song, as well as Jack Teagarden and His Orchestra
- "Beebe"
- "Oodles of Noodles"
- "John Silver" with Ray Krise, which reached no. 13 on Billboard in 1938, staying on the charts for 2 weeks
- "Parade of the Milk Bottle Caps"
- "Dusk in Upper Sandusky" with Larry Clinton
- "Shoot the Meatballs to Me Dominick Boy" with Toots Camarata
- "A Man and his Drums"
- "Mutiny in the Brass Section
- "Praying the Blues"
- "Contrasts", his theme song
- "Major and Minor Stomp"
- "Hep-Tee Hootie (Juke Box Jive)" with Fud Livingston and Jack Palmer
- "I Bought A Wooden Whistle"
- "Tailspin" with Frankie Trumbauer, the classic jazz standard
- "I'm Glad There Is You (In This World of Ordinary People)"
- "Clarinet Polka"
- "I Love You in Technicolor"
- "All The Things You Ain't" with Babe Russin
- "Hollywood Pastime"; re-released in 1951 with lyrics by Al Stillman as "Baby-O, Baby-O (Do That To Me")
- "Waddlin' at the Waldorf"
- "JD's Boogie Woogie"
- "Jumpin' Jehosaphat"
- "I'll Do Anything For You"
- "Any Time at All"
- "Two Again"
- "It's Anybody's Moon"
- "Dixieland Detour"
- "Shades of Twilight"
- "Dorsey Stomp"
- "Grand Central Getaway" with Dizzy Gillespie
- "Sunset Strip" and "The Champ" with Sonny Burke
- "Town Hall Tonight"
- "Outer Drive" with Herb Ellis
- the jazz standard "It's the Dreamer in Me" with Jimmy Van Heusen – recorded by Duke Ellington and others.

Dorsey co-wrote the jazz and pop standard "(In This World of Ordinary People) I'm Glad There Is You" with Paul Madeira, also known as Paul Mertz, in 1941. Mertz had been a pianist with the Jean Goldkette orchestra in the 1920s and had worked in Hollywood. Sung by Dorsey vocalist Bob Eberly, it was released on Decca as 4197B in 1942. It was also released on Decca 18799A with Dee Parker in 1946.

== Number-one hits ==
Jimmy Dorsey had eleven No. 1 hits with his orchestra in the 1930s and the 1940s:

- "Is It True What They Say About Dixie?"
- "Change Partners"
- "The Breeze and I"
- "Amapola"
- "My Sister and I"
- "María Elena"
- "Green Eyes"
- "Blue Champagne"
- "Tangerine"
- "Bésame Mucho"
- "Pennies from Heaven" with Bing Crosby
- "So Rare", which went to the No. 2 position in 1957, and was on the record charts for 38 weeks.

In 1935, he had two more number ones as part of the Dorsey Brothers Orchestra: "Lullaby of Broadway" and "Chasing Shadows". His biggest hit was "Amapola", which was number one for ten weeks in 1941 on the Billboard pop singles chart.

== Honors ==
In 1996, the U.S. Postal Service issued a Jimmy and Tommy Dorsey commemorative postage stamp.

In 2009, the Recording Academy added the 1942 recording of "Brazil (Aquarela do Brasil)", by Jimmy Dorsey & His Orchestra, to the Grammy Hall of Fame.

== V-Disc recordings ==
Dorsey and his band made a number of V-Discs when the program was in operation.

- Julia, No. 117A, 1940
- John Silver, No. 117B, 1940
- The Breeze (Bob Eberly, vocal)/You, You Darlin' (Helen O'Connell, vocal), No. 217B, 1940
- The Great Lie, No. 283A;Navy 63A, 1944
- Sunset Strip, No. 326A; Navy 106A, 1944
- Contrasts/Oh! What A Beautiful Mornin', No. 314A; Navy 94A, 1944
- Grand Central Getaway/All the Things You Ain't, No. 391B, 1944
- Long John Silver, No. 409B; Navy 189B, 1944
- Jumpin' Jehosaphat, No. 470B; Navy 189B, 1944
- Together, No. 514A; Navy 274A

== Grammy Hall of Fame ==
Jimmy Dorsey's recordings were posthumously inducted into the Grammy Hall of Fame, which is a special Grammy award established in 1973 to honor recordings that are at least 25 years old and that have "qualitative or historical significance."

Jimmy Dorsey: Grammy Hall of Fame Awards
Year Recorded	Title	Genre	Label	Year Inducted	Notes
1927	"Singin' the Blues"	Jazz (single)	Okeh	1977	Frankie Trumbauer and His Orchestra featuring Bix Beiderbecke and Eddie Lang
1942	"Brazil (Aquarela do Brasil)"	Jazz (single)	Decca	2008	
1930	"Georgia on My Mind"	Single	Victor	2014	By Hoagy Carmichael and His Orchestra
