= Bob Eberly =

American singer, vocalist (1916–1981)

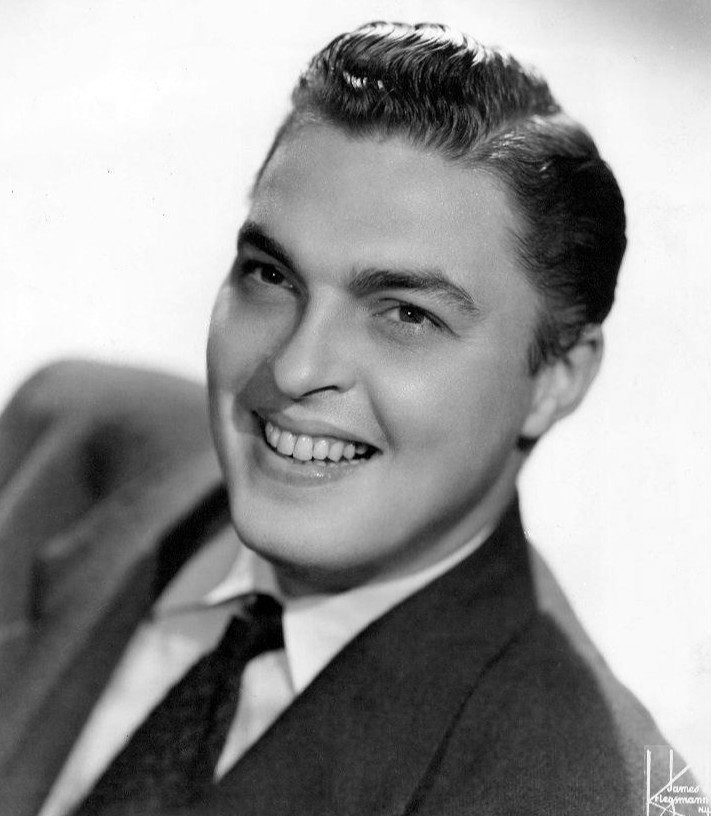
- Eberly in 1943

Background information
- Born: Robert Eberle; July 24, 1916; Mechanicville, New York, U.S.
- Died: November 17, 1981 (aged 65) Glen Burnie, Maryland, U.S.
- Genres: Jazz, big band
- Occupation: Vocalist
- Formerly of: Jimmy Dorsey

Robert Eberly (born Robert Eberle; July 24, 1916 – November 17, 1981) was an American big band vocalist best known for his association with Jimmy Dorsey and his duets with Helen O'Connell. His younger brother Ray was also a big-band singer, making his name with Glenn Miller and His Orchestra.

== Biography ==
Eberly was born Robert Eberle but changed the spelling of his surname slightly to the homonymous Eberly. His younger brother Ray was also a big-band singer, most notably with Glenn Miller's orchestra. Their father, John A. Eberle, was a policeman, sign-painter, and tavern-keeper. Another brother, Al, was a Hoosick Falls, New York, village trustee.

Eberly was hired by the Dorsey Brothers Orchestra in 1935 shortly after winning an amateur hour contest on Fred Allen's radio show and shortly before Tommy Dorsey left the band to form his own group. Eberly stayed with Jimmy Dorsey and would be a fixture with the orchestra until drafted into the service late in 1943. In the early 1940s the Jimmy Dorsey Orchestra scored a string of hits featuring Eberly and Helen O'Connell, with Eberly singing a slow, romantic baritone version of songs such as "Amapola" and "Tangerine", followed by a lighter, up-tempo reprise by O'Connell. Eberly also recorded the original version of "I'm Glad There Is You" in 1942 for Dorsey's orchestra on Decca Records. The song has become a jazz and pop standard.

In 1953, Eberly and Helen O'Connell headlined a summer replacement program for Perry Como's CBS television show. The program also featured Ray Anthony and his orchestra.

Eberly was married to Florine Callahan from January 23, 1940 until his death in 1981; the couple had three children, Robert Jr., Kathy and Rene. Robert Jr. went on to sing professionally and although he was talented, he never achieved the popularity of his father which was due, in part, to the changing times and the diminishing nightclub scene.

In 1980, Eberly had one lung removed but still continued to sing. He died of cancer in 1981 in Glen Burnie, Maryland, at the age of 65.

== Notable recordings ==
- "It's the Dreamer in Me" (with Jimmy Dorsey and His Orchestra; 1938)
- "Green Eyes" (with Helen O'Connell; 1941)
- "Tangerine" (with Helen O'Connell; 1941)
- "I'm Glad There Is You (In a World of Ordinary People)" (with Jimmy Dorsey and His Orchestra; 1942)
- "Bésame Mucho" (with Kitty Kallen; 1944)
- "Love Letters in the Sand (Cartas De Amor En La Arena)" (with Enoch Light & His Orchestra; 1957)
